= Eldee Young =

American jazz musician (1936–2007)

Eldee Young (January 7, 1936 – February 12, 2007) was a jazz double-bass and cello player who performed in the cool jazz, post bop and rhythm and blues mediums.

Born in 1936 in Chicago, Illinois, Young started playing upright bass at the age of 13. He was helped by his eldest brother who played guitar. He joined the Ramsey Lewis Trio in 1955. After a decade together he split along with bandmate, Isaac "Red" Holt to form the Young-Holt Trio. They changed their name to Young-Holt Unlimited in 1968. After they split in 1974, Young continued playing, mainly with small groups in Chicago.

He also played with pianist Jeremy Monteiro for more than 20 years. Young also appeared on the albums of James Moody and Eden Atwood, among others.

Young died in Bangkok, Thailand, from a heart attack at age 71.

== Discography ==
With Ramsey Lewis

- Ramsey Lewis and his Gentle-men of Swing (Argo, 1956)
- Ramsey Lewis and his Gentle-men of Jazz (Argo, 1956)
- Lem Winchester and the Ramsey Lewis Trio (Argo, 1958) - with Lem Winchester
- Down to Earth (EmArcy, 1958)
- An Hour with the Ramsey Lewis Trio (Argo, 1959)
- Stretching Out (Argo, 1960)
- The Ramsey Lewis Trio in Chicago (Argo, 1960)
- More Music from the Soil (Argo, 1961)
- Never on Sunday (Argo, 1961)
- Sound of Christmas (Argo, 1961)
- The Sound of Spring (Argo, 1962)
- Country Meets the Blues (Argo, 1962)
- Bossa Nova (Argo, 1962)
- Pot Luck (Argo, 1963)
- Barefoot Sunday Blues (Argo, 1963)
- Bach to the Blues (Argo, 1964)
- The Ramsey Lewis Trio at the Bohemian Caverns (Argo, 1964)
- More Sounds of Christmas (Argo, 1964)
- You Better Believe Me (Argo, 1964–65) - with Jean DuShon
- The In Crowd (Argo, 1965)
- Hang On Ramsey! (Argo, 1965)
- The Groover (Cadet, 1965 [1972])
- Wade in the Water (Cadet, 1966)
- Eldee Young and Company (1962). Just For Kicks. Argo Records.
- Young-Holt Unlimited (1967). Beat Goes On. Brunswick Records.
- Young-Holt Unlimited (1967). Young-Holt Unlimited Onstage. Brunswick Records.
- Young-Holt Unlimited (1968). Funky But!. Brunswick Records.
- Young-Holt Unlimited (1968). Live at the Bohemian Caverns 1968. Brunswick Records.
- Young-Holt Unlimited (1968). Soulful Strut. Brunswick Records.
- Young-Holt Unlimited (1970). Mellow Dreamin'. Cotillion Records.
- Young-Holt Unlimited (1971). Born Again. Cotillion Records.
- Young-Holt Unlimited (1972). Oh Girl. Atlantic Records.
- Young-Holt Unlimited (1973). Plays Super Fly. Paula Records.
- Ramsey Lewis (1975). Solid Ivory. Cadet Records.
- Ramsey Lewis Reunion (Columbia, 1980)
- April Aloisio (1985). Brazilian Heart. Southport Records.
- Eden Atwood (1992). No One Ever Tells You. Concord Records.
- Ramsey Lewis (1993). Wade In the Water. Jazz Time.
- Sparrow Shortwave (1994). Desert Rat Suite. Southport Records.
- April Aloisio (1996). Footprints. Southport Records.
- Ramsey Lewis (1998). In Concert 1965. Giants of Jazz.
- Ramsey Lewis (1998). In Person: 1960-1967. GRP Records.
- Joanie Pallatto (1998). Words & Music. Orchard Records.
- George Freeman (1999). George Burns. Orchard Records.
- James Moody (1999). Priceless Jazz. GRP Records.
- Anita O'Day (2000). Anita O'Day's Finest Hour. Verve Records.
- Marshall Vente (2001). Marshall Law. Middle Coast.
- Eldee Young; Marshall Vente (2002). Step Up to the Mic. Middle Coast.
- Sparrow & Joanie Pallatto (2003). Canned Beer. Southport Records.
- James Moody (2005). Hey! It's James Moody. Lone Hill Jazz.
- Wallace Burton; Eldee Young. The Singapore Strut.

With Lorez Alexandria

- Lorez Alexandria (1957). Lorez Sings Pres: A Tribute to Lester Young. Deluxe Records.
- Early in the Morning (Argo, 1960)

With Redd Holt

- Redd Holt (1961). Look Out! Look Out!. Argo Records.

With James Moody

- Hey! It's James Moody (Argo, 1959)
