= The 'In' Crowd =

1964 song written by Billy Page

Single by Dobie Gray

from the album Dobie Gray Sings for "In" Crowders That Go "Go-Go"
- B-side: "Be a Man"
- Released: November 1964
- Recorded: October 1964
- Studio: Gold Star Recording Studios, Hollywood, CA
- Genre: Rhythm and blues
- Length: 2:35
- Label: Charger
- Songwriter: Billy Page
- Producer: Fred Darian

Dobie Gray singles chronology
"Look at Me" (1963)	"The 'In' Crowd" (1964)	"See You at the Go-Go" (1965)

Official audio
- "The 'In' Crowd" on YouTube

"The 'In' Crowd"

Single by Ramsey Lewis Trio

from the album The In Crowd
- B-side: "Since I Fell for You"
- Released: June 1965
- Recorded: May 1965
- Venue: Bohemian Caverns, Washington, D.C.
- Genre: Jazz
- Length: 3:00 (single version); 5:50 (album version)
- Label: Argo
- Songwriter: Billy Page
- Producer: Esmond Edwards

Official audio
- The "In" Crowd (Live At The Bohemian Caverns, Washington, D.C., 1965) on YouTube

"The 'In' Crowd" is a 1964 song written by Billy Page and arranged by his brother Gene and originally performed by Dobie Gray on his album Dobie Gray Sings for "In" Crowders That Go "Go-Go". It appeared on an episode of Dick Clark's Rock, Roll & Remember, featuring in the last week of November 1964, the month Gray's rendition was released.

== Chart performance ==
In the US, Gray's version reached number 11 on the Hot Rhythm & Blues Singles chart and number 13 on the Billboard Hot 100 on 20 February 1965. Outside the US, "The 'In' Crowd" went to number 25 on the UK Singles Chart and number 8 in Canada. Gray's Shindig! performance of the song aired on 10 March 1965.

== Ramsey Lewis instrumental (1965) ==
The Ramsey Lewis Trio recorded an instrumental version of the tune in May 1965. Performed live at Bohemian Caverns nightclub in Washington, D.C., their jazzy take was released in June and reached number 5 on the Hot 100 on 9 October 1965, as well as peaking at number 2 for three weeks on the Hot Rhythm & Blues Singles chart. In Canada, the record reached number 6 in the RPM charts. A longer edit of the song provides the title track for the Trio's successful live album.

Writing in 2015, jazz critic Kevin Whitehead said: "As Lewis has told a couple of interviewers, the trio met at a nearby eatery to discuss repertoire. Their kibitzing waitress Nettie Gray suggested a current pop hit, "The 'In' Crowd" by Dobie Gray. Ramsey Lewis didn't know that tongue-in-cheek ode to hipster self-congratulation, so they dropped a coin in the jukebox. ... I hope they left Nettie Gray a very good tip. Ramsey Lewis liked "The 'In' Crowd" enough to work up an arrangement in the unjazzy key of D major so bassist Eldee Young could work his open strings. And the trio really amped up the groove. Opening night, the audience instantly locked in with drummer Redd Holt."

The Lewis Trio Argo single was inducted into the Grammy Hall of Fame in 2009.

== Other versions ==
- Bryan Ferry on his 1974 album Another Time, Another Place; also released as a single, reaching number 13 on the UK Singles Chart.
- "The 'In' Crowd" was the last cut on If You Can Believe Your Eyes and Ears, the first album put out by the group, the Mamas & the Papas, in 1966, with "Mama" Cass Elliot singing the lead vocal. The album reached number one on the Billboard album chart. In a 2020 retrospective review, published on the occasion of the album's reissue on vinyl, the staff of Best Classic Bands dubbed this version a "rollicking cover".
