= Time Flies (Ramsey Lewis album) =

Studio album by Ramsey Lewis
- Released: June 29, 2004
- Genres: Jazz, smooth jazz
- Length: 1:03:27
- Label: Narada
- Producers: Ramsey Lewis, Frayne Lewis, Kevin Randolph

Ramsey Lewis chronology
Simple Pleasures (2003)	Time Flies (2004)	Urban Knights VI (2005)

Time Flies is a studio album by Ramsey Lewis released in 2004 on Narada Records. The album reached No. 10 on the Billboard Top Jazz Albums chart.

== Critical reception ==
Professional ratings
Review scores
Source	Rating
JazzTimes	(favourable)
AllMusic	4/5 stars

Lucy Tauss of Jazz Times commented, "Ramsey Lewis explores his musical roots on Time Flies (Narada). The veteran pianist was deeply influenced not only by jazz, but also by classical and gospel music, and on Time Flies he takes a fresh look at the divergent styles that shaped him as an artist."

John Bergstrom of PopMatters claimed "When it keeps things fairly straight-up and acoustic, Time Flies remains a near-excellent effort.".

Adam Greenburg of AllMusic described the album as "a contemporary redo" of Lewis' career, infusing "important themes in his music over the decades" while incorporating "contemporary styles into the older songs" along with a combination of "classics, covers, and a few new items."

== Covers ==
Lewis recorded covers of Joe Turner and his Blues Kings' "Hide & Seek", Johann Sebastian Bach's "Air from Suite #3" and Maria Muldaur's "Midnight at the Oasis" for the album.

== Track listing ==
No.	Title	Writer(s)	Length
1.	"Poco Allegretto from Symphony #3 in F Major"	Johannes Brahms	06:32
2.	"Second Thoughts"	Ramsey Lewis	07:36
3.	"Wade in the Water"	Traditional	03:34
4.	"Open My Heart"	Yolanda Adams, James Harris III, Terry Lewis, James "Big Jim" Wright	07:39
5.	"Air from Suite #3"	Johann Sebastian Bach	06:24
6.	"Hide & Seek"	Ramsey Lewis	08:05
7.	"Midnight at the Oasis"	David Nichtern	03:32
8.	"Last Dance"	Ramsey Lewis	06:51
9.	"Estrellita"		05:57
10.	"The "In" Crowd"	Billy Page	03:42
11.	"Hosanna"	Kirk Franklin	03:35
