= Spaceflight (disambiguation) =

Spaceflight is the act of traveling in outer space.

Spaceflight or Space flight may also refer to:

- Spaceflight (magazine), published by the British Interplanetary Society
- Spaceflight (TV series), a 1985 American documentary miniseries about crewed spaceflight
- CU Spaceflight, a student-run Cambridge University society
- Spaceflight Industries, a smallsat rideshare company
- Space Flight (album), by Sam Layzar
- Space Flight (video game), about The Phenomenauts
- Space travel in science fiction
