= Never on Sunday (disambiguation) =

Never on Sunday is a Greek movie released in 1960.

Never on Sunday can also refer to:

- "Never on Sunday" (song), a popular song introduced in the movie by the same name and recorded by many groups thereafter
- Never on Sunday (album), a 1961 jazz album by the Ramsey Lewis Trio
- "Never on Sunday", a 1993 episode in the television series Step by Step
- "Never on Sunday", a 1996 episode of Lois & Clark: The New Adventures of Superman
- "Never on Sunday", a working title of the Frank Zappa song "Take Your Clothes Off When You Dance"
