= Sound of Christmas =

Studio album by Ramsey Lewis Trio
- Released: 1961
- Recorded: October 1961
- Studios: Ter-Mar Recording Studios, Chicago
- Genres: Jazz, Christmas
- Length: 29:05
- Labels: Argo; LP 687
- Producer: Ralph Bass

Ramsey Lewis chronology
| Never on Sunday (1961) | Sound of Christmas (1961) | The Sound of Spring (1962) |

Sound of Christmas is an album of Christmas music by the Ramsey Lewis Trio, recorded in 1961 and released on the Argo label. The album peaked at No. 8 on the Billboard Christmas LPs chart. Lewis recorded a second seasonal album, More Sounds of Christmas, in 1964.

== Reception ==
Professional ratings
Review scores
| Source | Rating |
|---|---|
| AllMusic | 3/5 stars |
| The Penguin Guide to Jazz Recordings | 2.5/4 stars |

Scott Yanow of AllMusic stated: "This is a pleasing, if rather brief (29 minutes) Christmas jazz album that was originally quite popular... fun and melodic, if not all that unique".

== Track listing ==
1. "Merry Christmas Baby" (Lou Baxter, Johnny Moore) - 4:04
2. "Winter Wonderland" (Felix Bernard, Richard B. Smith) - 2:11
3. "Santa Claus Is Coming to Town" (J. Fred Coots, Haven Gillespie) - 2:25
4. "Christmas Blues" (Skitch Henderson, Ramsey Lewis) - 2:50
5. "Here Comes Santa Claus" (Gene Autry, Oakley Haldeman) - 2:41
6. "The Sound of Christmas" (Riley Hampton, Lewis) - 2:22
7. "The Christmas Song" (Mel Tormé, Robert Wells) - 3:18
8. "God Rest Ye Merry Gentlemen" (Traditional) - 3:19
9. "Sleigh Ride" (Leroy Anderson, Mitchell Parish) - 2:58
10. "What Are You Doing New Year's Eve?" (Frank Loesser) - 3:27

== Personnel ==
- Ramsey Lewis - piano
- El Dee Young - bass
- Isaac "Redd" Holt - drums
- String section arranged and conducted by Riley Hampton (tracks 6–10)
