= Shelley Moore =

American singer (1932–2016)

Shelley Moore (born Doreen Rachel Morris; March 10, 1932 – June 23, 2016) was an English-born American jazz singer.

She was born in Essex, England. In the 1950s she performed in nightclubs and for American troops in England, appeared on British television and radio, and released several singles on the Columbia, Starlite, and Esquire record labels, including two EPs, Portrait of Shelley and Kool Kanary.

After touring the US with bandleader Vic Lewis, she began singing with the Ray McKinley band, and then moved to America in 1961. She was signed by the Argo label, a subsidiary of Chess Records. On her first album, For the First Time, her accompanists included Ramsey Lewis, Plas Johnson, and Eddie Harris. She wrote some of her own songs.

Moore married attorney Ken Golden, a U.S. citizen, and retired from the music industry in 1963 to raise their two children, Danny and Bryna. Later, she started performing again throughout Los Angeles and Orange Counties. She returned to performing in the late 1970s, in clubs in the Orange County area. In 1992 she released the album You Can Count on Me, which contained both standards and original songs.

== Death ==
A longtime Westminster, California resident, she died on June 23, 2016, aged 84. No place or cause of death was provided.
