= Taking Another Look =

Studio album by Ramsey Lewis
- Released: September 20, 2011
- Genre: Jazz
- Length: 52:29
- Label: Hidden Beach
- Producers: Ramsey Lewis, Frayne Lewis, Shane Theriot, Robert Carranza

Ramsey Lewis chronology
Songs from the Heart: Ramsey Plays Ramsey (2009)	Taking Another Look (2011)	Urban Knights VII (2019)

Taking Another Look is a studio album by American jazz musician Ramsey Lewis, released in 2011 on Hidden Beach Records. The album reached No. 13 on the Billboard Top Jazz Albums chart.

== Critical reception ==
Professional ratings
Review scores
Source	Rating
AllMusic	3.5/5 stars
Chicago Sun-Times	3.5/5 stars
PopMatters	(8/10)

Thomas Conner of the Chicago Sun-Times gave a 3.5/5 rating declaring, "I don’t say this often: Ramsey Lewis’ new album is worth a listen."

Matt Collar of AllMusic declared, "Pianist and contemporary jazz icon Ramsey Lewis revisits his classic 1974 electric jazz-funk album Sun Goddess for 2011's Ramsey, Taking Another Look. Featuring a newly minted lineup of his '70s electric band, Taking Another Look features keyboardist Mike Logan, guitarist Henry Johnson, bassist Joshua Ramos, and drummer Charles Heath, all of whom reveal a knack for the funky, soulful jazz Lewis is reinvestigating here."

Carl Schonbeck of PopMatters praised the album saying, "No polite promenade down memory lane, Ramsey Taking Another Look packs up everything to love about Sun Goddess and forcefully plants it in the here and now...Ramsey Taking Another Look is a record that few thought Ramsey Lewis would ever make (perhaps least of all the man himself) and goes to show sometimes the best things can occur out of nowhere. After his initial reluctance to revisit electric jazz, Lewis now rates his latest among the five best records he’s ever made. Who are any of us to argue?"

== Track listing ==
No.	Title	Writer(s)	Length
1.	"Intimacy"	Paul Iams, Paul Libman	8:01
2.	"Tambura"	Ramsey Lewis	4:18
3.	"Love Song"	Ramsey Lewis	5:19
4.	"Living For The City"	Stevie Wonder	5:28
5.	"Betcha by Golly, Wow"	Linda Epstein, Thomas Bell	5:00
6.	"To Know Her"	Ramsey Lewis	5:29
7.	"The Way She Smiles"	Ramsey Lewis	3:07
8.	"Jungle Strut"	Ramsey Lewis	4:14
9.	"Sharing Her Journey"	Ramsey Lewis	6:21
10.	"Sun Goddess"	Maurice White, Jon Lind	4:59

=== Bonus tracks ===
No.	Title	Writer(s)	Length
1.	"Jungle Strut by Dr. John"	Ramsey Lewis	4:34
2.	"Tambura by Kung Fu"	Ramsey Lewis	5:05
3.	"Sharing Her Journey by Tauk"	Ramsey Lewis	5:25
