= You Better Believe =

You Better Believe may refer to:

- "You Better Believe", song by Gene Vincent from Gene Vincent and His Blue Caps 1957, covered by Jeff Beck on Crazy Legs 1993
- "You Better Believe", song by Train from A Girl, a Bottle, a Boat 2017

== See also ==
- You Better Believe It
- You Better Believe It!
- You Better Believe Me
