= Redd Holt =

American jazz and soul music drummer (1932–2023)

Background information
- Birth name: Isaac Holt
- Born: May 16, 1932; Rosedale, Mississippi, U.S.
- Died: May 23, 2023 (aged 91); Chicago, Illinois, U.S.
- Genres: Jazz, soul
- Instruments: Drums
- Years active: 1956–2020
- Spouse: Marylean Green (m. 1954)

Isaac "Redd" Holt (May 16, 1932 – May 23, 2023) was an American jazz and soul music drummer. He was the drummer on the album The In Crowd which earned the Ramsey Lewis Trio critical praise and the 1965 Grammy Award for Best Jazz Performance.

== Early life and education ==
Holt was born in Rosedale, Mississippi, on May 16, 1932, and raised in Chicago. He first began playing drums as a student at Crane High School, where he played in an ensemble with future collaborators Ramsey Lewis and Eldee Young. Holt studied music at the Chicago Musical College and radio and television at Kennedy–King College.

== Career ==
Holt enlisted in the United States Army in 1954 and was stationed in Germany, where he played with a military band, and upon his return worked with Lewis, alongside Young, from 1956 to 1966, in addition to recording with Earl Bostic and James Moody near the end of the 1950s.

In 1966, Young and Holt split with Lewis and formed their own group, Young-Holt Unlimited, which went on to achieve commercial success as an instrumental soul band. Their band's biggest hit was released in November 1968 as "Soulful Strut" credited to Young-Holt Unlimited and it became a gold record No. 3 hit in the United States and went to No. 1 in Canada. After the group's dissolution in 1974 Holt continued on as Redd Holt Unlimited, playing under this name into the 1990s, and worked in jazz education in Illinois. He founded the Gumption Artist Workshop, which was active from 1980 to 1985, and played internationally, including at the 1988 Montreux Jazz Festival and in Singapore in the late-1980s and early-1990s. For 20 years, Holt also played with a trio at the East Bank Club in Chicago. The studio sessions produced a vinyl LP named, It's A Take! on the Treehouse Record label with eight full-length jazz standards. He continued to perform regularly until the COVID-19 pandemic.

== Personal life and death ==
In 1954, Holt married Marylean Green, and they had three sons. He died from lung cancer at a hospital in Chicago on May 23, 2023, at the age of 91.

== Discography ==
=== As leader ===
- Look Out!! Look Out!! (Argo, 1963)
- Isaac, Isaac, Isaac (Paula, 1974)
- The Other Side of the Moon (Paula, 1975)

With Eldee Young

- Just for Kicks (Argo, 1962)
- Wack Wack (Brunswick, 1966)
- The Beat Goes On (Brunswick, 1967)
- Feature Spot (Cadet, 1967)
- Soulful Strut (Brunswick, 1968)
- Funky But! (Brunswick, 1968)
- Mellow Dreamin (Cotillion, 1970)
- Born Again (Cotillion, 1971)
- Oh Girl (Atlantic, 1973)
- Plays Super Fly (Paula, 1973)
- Another Evening at Somerset's Bar (Westin Plaza, 1990)
- Blues for the Saxophone Club (Golden String, 1996)
- Live at the Bohemian Caverns 1968 (Brunswick, 1998)

=== As sideman ===
With Ramsey Lewis

- Ramsey Lewis and his Gentle-men of Swing (Argo, 1956)
- Ramsey Lewis and his Gentle-men of Jazz (Argo, 1956)
- Down to Earth (EmArcy, 1958)
- Lem Winchester and the Ramsey Lewis Trio (Argo, 1958)
- An Hour with the Ramsey Lewis Trio (Argo, 1959)
- The Ramsey Lewis Trio in Chicago (Argo, 1960)
- Stretching Out (Argo, 1960)
- More Music from the Soil (Argo, 1961)
- Sound of Christmas (Argo, 1961)
- Never on Sunday (Argo, 1961)
- The Sound of Spring (Argo, 1962)
- Country Meets the Blues (Argo, 1962)
- Bossa Nova (Argo, 1962)
- Pot Luck (Argo, 1963)
- Barefoot Sunday Blues (Argo, 1963)
- More Sounds of Christmas (Argo, 1964)
- The Ramsey Lewis Trio at the Bohemian Caverns (Argo, 1964)
- Bach to the Blues (Argo, 1964)
- You Better Believe Me (Argo, 1965)
- The In Crowd (Argo, 1965)
- Hang On Ramsey! (Cadet, 1965)
- Swingin (Cadet, 1966)
- The Groover (Cadet, 1972)
- Solid Ivory (Cadet, 1974)
- Reunion (Columbia, 1983)

With others

- Lorez Alexandria, Early in the Morning (Argo, 1960)
- Eden Atwood, No One Ever Tells You (Concord Jazz, 1993)
- Bill Henderson, Sings (Vee Jay, 1959)
- Jeremy Monteiro & Young & Holt, Live at the Montreal Jazz Festival (J.J. Jazz, 2001)
- James Moody, Last Train from Overbrook (Argo, 1958)
- Shelley Moore, For the First Time... (Argo, 1961)
- Ken Nordine, Son of Word Jazz (Dot, 1957)
- Ken Nordine, Love Words (Dot, 1958)
