= Dance of the Soul =

Studio album by Ramsey Lewis
- Released: 1998
- Genre: Jazz
- Length: 51:07
- Label: GRP

Ramsey Lewis chronology
Urban Knights II (1997)	Dance of the Soul (1998)	Apassionata (1999)

Dance of the Soul is a studio album by American jazz musician Ramsey Lewis, released in 1998 on GRP Records. The album reached No. 11 on the Billboard Top Contemporary Jazz Albums chart and No. 12 on the Billboard Top Jazz Albums chart.

== Critical reception ==
Professional ratings
Review scores
Source	Rating
AllMusic	3/5 stars

Patricia Myers of JazzTimes found "Ramsey Lewis has created a bounty of fresh Latin-influenced soul charts of exceptional variety. Again playing only acoustic concert grand piano, his approach is more mainstream than the contemporary tone of his previous issue, Between the Keys." Alex Henderson of AllMusic wrote, "Although not a masterpiece, Dance of the Soul is a decent effort that has more ups than downs."

== Track listing ==
No.	Title	Writer(s)	Length
1.	"Baile Del Alma (Dance Of The Soul)"	Ryan Cohan	6:36
2.	"Fragile"	Sting	4:09
3.	"Sub Dude"	Ramsey Lewis, Kevin Randolph	4:22
4.	"Lullaby"	Ryan Cohan	5:30
5.	"Portuguese Love"	Teena Marie	3:56
6.	"Fire And Rain"	Frayne Lewis, Kevin Randolph, Ramsey Lewis, Lambert Waldrip	4:30
7.	"Canción"	Ryan Cohan	5:52
8.	"Love's Serenade"	Frayne Lewis, Kevin Randolph, Ramsey Lewis	4:30
9.	"Mercy And Grace"	Frayne Lewis, Kevin Randolph, Ramsey Lewis	4:02
10.	"Cante Hondo (Deep Song)"	Ryan Cohan	7:34

== Credits ==
- Alejo Poveda-Percussion
- Charles Webb-Bass
- Danny Leake-Engineer, Mixing
- Donica Henderson-Guest Artist
- Fareed Haque-Guest Artist, Guitar
- Frayne Lewis-Composer, Producer
- Harry Brotman-Engineer
- Hollis King-Art Direction
- Isabelle Wong-Graphic Design
- Kevin Randolph-Composer, Guest Artist, Keyboards
- Lambert Waldrip-Composer, Guest Artist
- Matt Prock-Mixing Assistant
- Maurice Fitzgerald-Bass
- Michael Logan-Keyboards
- Orbert Davis-Flugelhorn, Guest Artist, Trumpet
- Oscar Seaton-Drums
- Ramsey Lewis-Composer, Fender Rhodes, Piano, Piano (Electric), Primary Artist
- Ryan Cohan-Composer
- Steve Hardeman-Guest Artist
- Sting-Composer
- Ted Jensen-Mastering
- Teena Marie-Composer
