= Simple Pleasures (Ramsey Lewis and Nancy Wilson album) =

Studio album by Ramsey Lewis & Nancy Wilson
- Released: July 22, 2003
- Genre: Jazz
- Length: 54:38
- Label: Narada

Ramsey Lewis chronology
Urban Knights V (2003)	Simple Pleasures (2003)	Time Flies (2004)

Nancy Wilson chronology
A Nancy Wilson Christmas (2001)	Simple Pleasures (2003)	R.S.V.P. (Rare Songs, Very Personal) (2004)

Simple Pleasures is a studio album by American jazz artists Ramsey Lewis and Nancy Wilson released in 2003 on Narada Records. The album reached No. 9 on the Billboard Top Jazz Albums chart.

== Critical reception ==
Professional ratings
Review scores
Source	Rating
AllMusic	4/5 stars

Christopher Loudon of JazzTimes claimed, "It took 18 years for Nancy Wilson and Ramsey Lewis to reteam after 1984's sublime The Two of Us. Fortunately, it has taken only 18 months for the lifelong pals to follow up on last year's equally delightful Meant to Be. Their third collaboration, the rather ironically titled Simple Pleasures (Narada), is a somewhat more complex affair than either of their previous outings. This time around, Lewis and Wilson, neither a stranger to lush settings, enrich the proceedings with a polished horn section that suits both well."

Jonathan Widran of AllMusic noted "Simple Pleasures features both vocals and instrumentals with a wide range of dynamics, from his romantic but too subtle piano melody on 'In My Life,' to Wilson's fiery belting over a sea of snazzy horns on 'Give Me Something Real.' It's great to hear her let loose, but the slower, sensual side of her vocal prowess (on tunes like 'Lost Up in Loving You') is even more inviting."

== Track listing ==
No.	Title	Writer(s)	Length
1.	"In the Name of Love"	Ralph MacDonald, William Salter	4:29
2.	"Slippin' into Darkness"	Thomas Sylvester Allen, Harold Brown, Morris "B.B." Dickerson, Lonnie Jordan, Charles Miller, Lee Oskar, Howard Scott, Ramsey Lewis, Nancy Wilson	6:04
3.	"All This Love"	El DeBarge	5:06
4.	"In My Life"	John Lennon, Paul McCartney	6:40
5.	"Give Me Something Real"	Clark Anderson Edwin, Warren Mervyn	4:00
6.	"Lost up in Loving You"	Kenny Rankin, Yvonne Rankin	3:18
7.	"Ooh Child"	Stan Vincent	4:51
8.	"One True Thing"	Ramsey Lewis	5:58
9.	"God Bless the Child"	Billie Holiday, Arthur Herzog, Jr.	6:12
10.	"Gentle Persuasion"	Ramsey Lewis	8:00

== Credits ==
- Acoustic bass – Larry Gray
- Arranged by Larry Gray
- Horns arrangement by – Llew Mathews
- Co-producer [Production Assistant] – Doug Johnson
- Concert Grand Piano [Steinway] – Ramsey Lewis
- Design – Connie Gage
- Drums, Percussion – Leon Joyce, Jr
- Electric bass – Larry Gray
- Assistant engineers – Azoulas Sinkevicius, Brian Pinke, Eddie Davis
- Guitar – Henry Johnson
- Electric keyboards – Llew Mathews
- Mastered by Trevor Sadler
- Percussion – Alejo Poveda
- Photography – Robert Kessler
- Producer – Ramsey Lewis
- Additional recording by Matt LeJeune
- Recorded and mixed by Danny Leake
- Tenor saxophone, flute – Steve Eisen
- Trombone – Tracy Kirk
- Trumpet – Orbert Davis
- Vocals – Nancy Wilson
