= Ramsey Lewis Live at the Savoy =

Live album by Ramsey Lewis
- Released: 1982
- Studio: CBS Recording Studios, New York, New York; Hollywood Sound, Los Angeles, California; P.S. Studios, Chicago, Illinois; The Savoy Theater, New York, New York
- Genre: Jazz
- Length: 47:21
- Label: Columbia

Ramsey Lewis chronology
Three Piece Suite (1981)	Ramsey Lewis Live at the Savoy (1982)	Chance Encounter (1982)

Ramsey Lewis Live at the Savoy is a live album by American jazz musician Ramsey Lewis, released in 1982 on Columbia Records. The album reached No. 10 on the Billboard Top Jazz Albums chart.

== Critical reception ==
Professional ratings
Review scores
Source	Rating
AllMusic	3/5 stars

Martha Smith of the Providence Journal declared Lewis "is back on track here with a dynamic album recorded live at the Savoy in New York."

== Track listing ==
No.	Title	Writer(s)	Length
1.	"Close Your Eyes and Remember"	Ramsey Lewis	6:55
2.	"Sassy Stew"	Ramsey Lewis	6:46
3.	"Callin' Fallin'"	L. Bates, R Irving III	4:19
4.	"Baby What You Want Me to Do"	Ramsey Lewis	4:13
5.	"You Never Know"	L. Bates, R Irving III	4:34
6.	"Lynn"	H. Johnson	5:36
7.	"It's Just Called Love"	H. Johnson	6:22
8.	"Hits Medley (Wade In The Water, Hang On Sloopy, The In Crowd"	Wes Farrell, Bobby Russell	6:44

== Credits ==
- Bass – Greg Williams
- Co-producer – Ramsey Lewis
- Conductor – Tom Tom "84"
- Drums – Terry Morrisette
- Electric Piano – Dean Gant, Robert Irving III
- Engineer – Joe Jorgensen
- Executive Producer – George Butler
- Guitar – Henry Johnson, Phil Upchurch
- Percussion – Steve Thornton, Tom Washington
- Piano – Ramsey Lewis
- Producer – Thomas C. Washington (Tom Tom "84")

Saxophone – Don Myrick, Grover Washington, Jr.

- Synthesizer – Dean Gant
- Trombone – Louis Satterfield
- Trumpet – "Yob" Michael Harris, "Rahmlee" Michael Davis
- Vocals – Alice Echols, Alisa Gyse, Clora Williams, John (Yohon) Harbin, Morris Gray
