= Down to Earth (Ramsey Lewis album) =

Studio album by Ramsey Lewis
- Released: 1959
- Recorded: November 6 and December 4, 1958
- Studios: Ter Mar Recording Studios, Chicago
- Genre: Jazz
- Labels: EmArcy; MG 36150
- Producer: Jack Tracy

Ramsey Lewis chronology
Lem Winchester and the Ramsey Lewis Trio (1958)	Down to Earth (1959)	An Hour with the Ramsey Lewis Trio (1959)

Down to Earth (subtitled The Ramsey Lewis Trio Plays Music from the Soil) is the fourth album by American jazz pianist Ramsey Lewis, recorded in 1958 and released on the EmArcy label.

== Reception ==
Professional ratings
Review scores
Source	Rating
AllMusic	4/5 stars
The Penguin Guide to Jazz Recordings	3/4 stars

AllMusic stated: "The music (if not essential) is quite accessible while still being jazz oriented. Worth picking up".

== Track listing ==
1. "Dark Eyes" (Traditional) - 2:28
2. "Come Back to Sorrento" (Traditional) - 3:10
3. "Soul Mist" (Ramsey Lewis) - 3:00
4. "John Henry" (Traditional) - 2:26
5. "Greensleeves" (Traditional) - 4:25
6. "We Blue It" (Eldee Young, Ramsey Lewis, Red Holt) - 5:01
7. "Sometimes I Feel Like a Motherless Child" (Traditional) - 2:10
8. "Suzanne" (Traditional) - 3:15
9. "Billy Boy" (Traditional) - 2:37
10. "Decisions" (Eldee Young) - 2:06

== Personnel ==
- Ramsey Lewis - piano
- El Dee Young - bass
- Isaac "Redd" Holt - drums
