= Country Meets the Blues =

Studio album by Ramsey Lewis Trio
- Released: 1962
- Recorded: August 2 & 3, 1962
- Studio: Bell Sound (New York City)
- Genre: Jazz
- Labels: Argo; LP 701
- Producer: Ralph Bass

Ramsey Lewis chronology
The Sound of Spring (1962)	Country Meets the Blues (1962)	Bossa Nova (1962)

Country Meets the Blues is an album of jazz interpretations of country music and blues tunes performed by the Ramsey Lewis' Trio which was recorded in 1962 and released on the Argo label.

== Reception ==
Professional ratings
Review scores
Source	Rating
AllMusic	2/5 stars

Allmusic awarded the album 4 stars.

== Track listing ==
1. "Your Cheatin' Heart" (Hank Williams) - 2:59
2. "St. Louis Blues" (W. C. Handy) - 3:07
3. "Blueberry Hill" (Al Lewis, Vincent Rose, Larry Stock) - 2:43
4. "Country Meets the Blues" - (Ramsey Lewis) 2:27
5. "Memphis in June" (Hoagy Carmichael, Paul Francis Webster) - 3:05
6. "High Noon" (Dimitri Tiomkin, Ned Washington) - 4:46
7. "I Need You So" (Ivory Joe Hunter) - 3:21
8. "I Just Want to Make Love to You" (Willie Dixon) - 2:45
9. "Tangleweed 'Round My Heart" (Roy Kelley, Forrest Wyatt) - 3:24
10. "My Bucket's Got a Hole in It" (Clarence Williams) - 1:56

== Personnel ==
- Ramsey Lewis - piano
- El Dee Young - bass
- Isaac "Redd" Holt - drums
- String section arranged by Lew Douglas
- Reeds arranged by Oliver Nelson
