= The Sound of Spring =

Studio album by Ramsey Lewis Trio
- Released: 1962
- Recorded: February 14 & 15, 1962
- Studios: United Recordings Studio, Hollywood, California
- Genre: Jazz
- Labels: Argo; LP 693
- Producers: Leonard Chess, Ruth Brown

Ramsey Lewis chronology
Sound of Christmas (1961)	The Sound of Spring (1962)	Country Meets the Blues (1962)

Professional ratings
Review scores
Source	Rating
AllMusic	2/5 stars
DownBeat	3.5/5 stars
The Encyclopedia of Popular Music	3/5 stars

The Sound of Spring is an album of compositions related to springtime by the Ramsey Lewis Trio, recorded in 1962 and released on the Argo label.

== Track listing ==
All compositions by Ramsey Lewis except as indicated

1. "Sound of Spring" - 2:30
2. "Spring Can Really Hang You Up the Most" (Fran Landesman, Tommy Wolf) - 4:25
3. "Blue Spring" - 3:00
4. "Spring Is Here" (Lorenz Hart, Richard Rodgers) - 4:22
5. "Spring Will Be a Little Late This Year" (Frank Loesser) - 2:43
6. "Spring Fever" - 2:35
7. "It Might As Well Be Spring" (Oscar Hammerstein II, Rogers) - 3:52
8. "Soft Winds" (Benny Goodman, Fletcher Henderson) - 3:10
9. "There'll Be Another Spring" (Peggy Lee, Hubie Wheeler) - 2:30
10. "Truly, Truly Spring" (Eldee Young) - 3:27

== Personnel ==
- Ramsey Lewis - piano
- El Dee Young - bass
- Isaac "Redd" Holt - drums
- String section arranged and conducted by Riley Hampton (tracks 1–5)
