= Soul Merchant =

Studio album by Sam Lazar
- Released: 1962
- Recorded: November 21, 196
- Studio: Tel Mar Recording Studios, Chicago, Illinois
- Genre: Jazz
- Length: 29:31
- Label: Argo; LP-714
- Producer: Esmond Edwards

Sam Lazar chronology
Playback (1962)	Soul Merchant (1962)

Soul Merchant is an album recorded by organist Sam Lazar and released on the Argo label.

== Reception ==
Professional ratings
Review scores
Source	Rating
Allmusic	2/5 stars

Allmusic awarded the album 2 stars.

== Track listing ==
All compositions by Sam Lazar except as indicated

1. "High Noon" (Dimitri Tiomkin, Ned Washington) - 4:18
2. "Happy Bossa Nova" - 4:16
3. "Sam's Jams" - 6:12
4. "C C Rider" (Traditional) - 5:07
5. "Smooth Coasting" - 3:45
6. "Soul Merchant" - 5:53

== Personnel ==
- Sam Lazar - organ
- Miller Brisker - tenor saxophone
- George Eskridge - guitar
- Phil Thomas - drums
