= Bach to the Blues =

Studio album by Ramsey Lewis Trio
- Released: 1964
- Recorded: January 31, 1964; Ter Mar Recording Studio, Chicago, Illinois
- Genre: Jazz
- Labels: Argo; LP 732
- Producer: Esmond Edwards

Ramsey Lewis chronology
Barefoot Sunday Blues (1963)	Bach to the Blues (1964)	The Ramsey Lewis Trio at the Bohemian Caverns (1964)

Bach to the Blues is an album performed by the Ramsey Lewis Trio that was recorded in 1964 and released on the Argo label.

== Reception ==
Professional ratings
Review scores
Source	Rating
Allmusic	3/5 stars

Allmusic awarded the album 3 stars, with its review by Scott Yanow stating: "the group performs five original themes based on classical music, along with four blues-oriented tunes. Although a touch lightweight, the music is enjoyable enough and certainly superior to most of Lewis' output in the 1970s and '80s".

== Track listing ==
All compositions by Ramsey Lewis except as indicated

1. "For the Love of a Princess" - 3:48
2. "Why Don't You Do Right?" (Lil Green) - 4:20
3. "Misty Days, Lonely Nights" - 3:21
4. "Bach to the Blues" (Esmond Edwards) - 2:30
5. "Travel On" (Eldee Young) - 3:44
6. "Dance Mystique" - 5:30
7. "Sadness Done Come" - 3:52
8. "You'll Love Me Yet" - 3:06
9. "Peace and Tranquility" (Young) - 5:36

== Personnel ==
- Ramsey Lewis - piano
- Eldee Young - bass, cello
- Richard Evans - bass (tracks 5 & 9)
- Isaac "Redd" Holt - drums

== Classical Sources ==
1. "For the Love of a Princess" - III.movement "The Young Prince and The Young Princess" from Scheherazade (Rimsky-Korsakov) Op.35, Nikolai Rimsky-Korsakov
2. "Misty Days, Lonely Nights" - Vocalise (Rachmaninoff), Sergei Rachmaninoff
3. "Bach to the Blues" - Wachet auf, ruft uns die Stimme, BWV 140 (Sleepers Wake), Johann Sebastian Bach
4. "Dance Mystique" - Coffee (Arabian Dance) from The Nutcracker Suite Op.71a, Pyotr Ilyich Tchaikovsky
5. "You'll Love Me Yet" - Johannes Brahms's Third Symphony in F Major, Op. 90, III. Poco allegretto (see also Brahms's Third Symphony in popular culture)
