= Sun Goddess (song) =

Single by Ramsey Lewis featuring Earth, Wind & Fire

from the album Sun Goddess
- B-side: "Jungle Strut"
- Released: 1975
- Genre: Smooth soul, R&B
- Length: 3:08 (US single version) 3:57 (UK single version) 8:28 (album version)
- Label: Columbia
- Songwriter(s): Jon Lind and Maurice White
- Producer(s): Maurice White

Ramsey Lewis singles chronology
"What's The Name Of This Funk (Spider Man)" (1975)	"Sun Goddess" (1975)	"Don't It Feel Good" (1976)

Earth, Wind & Fire singles chronology
"Shining Star" (1975)	"Sun Goddess" (1975)	"That's the Way of the World" (1975)

"Sun Goddess" is a smooth soul song by jazz pianist Ramsey Lewis featuring the band Earth, Wind & Fire issued as a single in 1975 on Columbia Records. The song peaked at No. 20 on the Billboard Hot Soul Singles chart.

== Overview ==
"Sun Goddess" was produced by Maurice White and composed by White together with Jon Lind. The song appears on Lewis's 1974 album of the same name.

The song was used as the basis for E-40's single “Hope I Don’t Go Back.”

== Credits ==
- Featuring: Earth, Wind & Fire
- Producer: Maurice White
- Composer: Maurice White & Jon Lind
- Recording Engineer: Paul Serrano
- Engineer: Lester Smith & Dave Antler
- Arranger: Ramsey Lewis
- Guitar: Johnny Graham
- Timbales: Maurice White
- Drums: Maurice White
- Synthesizer: Charles Stepney
- Electric Piano [Fender Rhodes]: Charles Stepney
- Tenor Saxophone: Don Myrick
- Piano Solo: Ramsey Lewis
- Vocals: Verdine White, Philip Bailey & Maurice White
- Congas: Philip Bailey
- Bass Guitar: Verdine White

== Charts ==
Chart (1974)	Peak position
U.S. Billboard Hot 100	44
U.S. Billboard Hot Soul Singles	20
