= Ramsey Lewis and his Gentle-men of Swing =

Studio album by Ramsey Lewis
- Released: 1956
- Recorded: 1956; Chicago
- Genre: Jazz
- Labels: Argo; LP 611
- Producers: Leonard Chess, Phil Chess

Ramsey Lewis chronology
Ramsey Lewis and his Gentle-men of Swing (1956)	Ramsey Lewis and his Gentle-men of Jazz (1958)

Ramsey Lewis and his Gentle-men of Swing (later rereleased as Swingin') is the debut album by American jazz pianist Ramsey Lewis, recorded and released on the Argo label in 1956.

== Reception ==
Professional ratings
Review scores
Source	Rating
AllMusic	4/5 stars
The Encyclopedia of Popular Music	3/5 stars

AllMusic stated: "Lewis sounds like a cross between John Lewis and Oscar Peterson ... worth taking a chance on".

== Track listing ==
All compositions by Ramsey Lewis except as indicated

1. "Carmen" (Georges Bizet) - 4:30
2. "I'll Remember April" (Gene de Paul, Patricia Johnston, Don Raye) - 4:07
3. "The Wind" (Russ Freeman) - 4:00
4. "Bei Mir Bist du Schön" (Jacob Jacobs, Sholom Secunda, Sammy Cahn, Saul Chaplin) - 3:13
5. "My Funny Valentine" (Lorenz Hart, Richard Rodgers) - 3:10
6. "Fantasia for Drums" - 5:45
7. "Dee's New Blues" (Eldee Young) - 5:45
8. "Tres" - 4:45
9. "Limelight" (Gerry Mulligan) - 2:17

== Personnel ==
- Ramsey Lewis - piano
- Eldee Young - bass
- Isaac "Redd" Holt - drums
