= Wade in the Water (album) =

Studio album by Ramsey Lewis
- Released: 1966
- Recorded: May 26, 1966 to June 29, 1966
- Studios: Universal Recording Studio, Chicago
- Genre: Jazz
- Labels: Cadet; LPS-774
- Producer: Esmond Edwards

Ramsey Lewis chronology
Hang On Ramsey! (1965)	Wade in the Water (1966)	Goin' Latin (1967)

Wade in the Water is an album by Ramsey Lewis, issued in 1966 on Cadet Records. The album peaked at No. 2 on the Billboard R&B LPs chart and No. 10 on the Billboard Top LPs chart.

== Critical reception ==
Professional ratings
Review scores
Source	Rating
AllMusic	3.5/5 stars

With a 3.5 out of 5 star rating, Richard S. Ginelli of Allmusic declared "Like The In Crowd, this record evokes its era indelibly."

=== Accolades ===
"Hold It Right There" won a Grammy Award for Best Rhythm & Blues Group Performance - Vocal or Instrumental.

== Singles ==
The album's title track reached No. 3 on the Billboard Top Soul Singles chart and No. 19 on the Billboard Hot 100.

== Track listing ==
=== Side 1 ===
1. "Wade in the Water" (Traditional) (3:46)
2. "Ain't That Peculiar" (Pete Moore, Smokey Robinson, Bobby Rogers, Marv Tarplin) (2:48)
3. "Tobacco Road" (John D. Loudermilk) (4:34)
4. "Money in the Pocket" (Joe Zawinul) (2:41)
5. "Message to Michael" (Burt Bacharach, Hal David) (3:09)

=== Side 2 ===
1. "Uptight (Everything's Alright)" (Henry Cosby, Stevie Judkins, Sylvia Moy) (5:44)
2. "Hold It Right There" (Richard Evans) (2:24)
3. "Day Tripper" (John Lennon, Paul McCartney) (3:07)
4. "Mi Compasion" (Esmond Edwards) (3:06)
5. "Hurt So Bad" (Teddy Randazzo, Bobby Weinstein, Robert Harshman) (3:04)

== Personnel ==
- Ramsey Lewis – keyboards
- John Avant – trombone
- Cleveland Eaton – bass
- Richard Evans – arrangements, conductor
- Maurice White – drums

Technical

- Bob Kidder, Bruce Swedien – recording engineer
- Don Bronstein – cover photography
