= Jeremy Monteiro =

Singaporean jazz musician

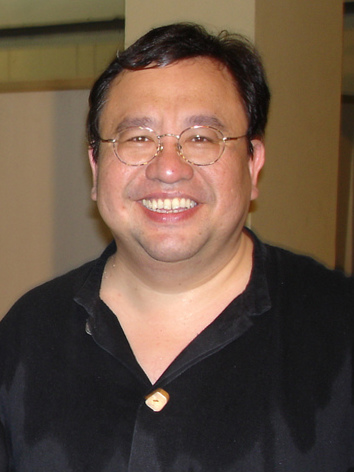

Background information
- Born: 20 June 1960 (age 66); State of Singapore
- Genres: Jazz, Latin jazz, classical, Chinese classical
- Occupations: Musician, composer, bandleader
- Instruments: Piano, keyboards, organ
- Years active: 1976–present
- Label: Jazznote Records
- Website: www.jeremymonteiro.com

Jeremy Ian Monteiro (born 20 June 1960, Singapore) is a Singaporean jazz pianist, singer, composer, and music educator. In Singapore he was mentioned by the local press as Singapore's "King of Swing". Monteiro was awarded the Cultural Medallion (in the Music category) by the National Arts Council, Singapore in 2002.

== Career ==
Monteiro is a Eurasian Singaporean.

In 2021, Monteiro was elected chairman of Compass (Composers and Authors Society of Singapore).

Monteiro was also the executive director and music director of the Jazz Association (Singapore).

== Personal life ==
Monteiro was drawn to the spontaneity of jazz and turned professional at the age of 16.

Monteiro has two sisters, Sheila and Claressa, the latter a professional jazz singer.

== Discography ==
- Always in Love (J.J. Jazz, 1990)
- Songs My Dad Taught Me (First Impression Music, 1997)
- Live at the Montreux Jazz Festival with Redd Holt, Eldee Young (J.J. Jazz, 2001)
- A Song for You, Karen (First Impression Music, 2002)
- Singapore Swing (2009)
- Jazz-Blues Brothers (Verve Records, 2014)
- To Paris With Love: A Tribute to the Genius of Michel Legrand with Eugene Pao (Jazznote, 2015)
- Live at No Black Tie Kuala Lumpur with Jay Anderson and Lewis Nash (Jazznote Records, 2021)
- Jazz-Blues Brothers (Jazznote Records, 2021)
