= Bossa Nova (Ramsey Lewis album) =

Studio album by Ramsey Lewis Trio
- Released: 1962
- Recorded: September 22 & 25, 1962
- Studios: Yamaha Studio, Los Angeles, California
- Genre: Jazz
- Length: 34:45
- Labels: Argo; LP 705
- Producer: Ralph Bass

Ramsey Lewis chronology
| Country Meets the Blues (1962) | Bossa Nova (1962) | Pot Luck (1963) |

Bossa Nova is an album of Bossa nova compositions by Ramsey Lewis' Trio featuring tracks recorded in 1962 and released on the Argo label.

== Reception ==
Professional ratings
Review scores
| Source | Rating |
|---|---|
| Allmusic | 4/5 stars |

Allmusic awarded the album 4 stars stating "the Ramsey Lewis Trio embraced the sunkissed Rio groove to create one of its most unusual and engaging LPs".

== Track listing ==
1. "Samba de Orpheus" (Antônio Carlos Jobim, Luiz Bonfá) – 3:35
2. "Maha de Carnaval (The Morning of the Carnaval)" (Jobim, Bonfá) – 4:41
3. "A Criancinhas (The Children)" (El Dee Young) – 2:37
4. "A Noite Do Meu Bem (The Night of My Love)" (Dolores Duran) – 4:17
5. "O Pato (The Duck)" (Jayme Silva, Neuza Teixeira) – 2:37
6. "Generique (Happiness)" (Traditional) – 5:00
7. "Roda Moinho (Whirlpool)" (Vince Guaraldi) – 3:19
8. "Cara de Palhaco (The Face of the Clown)" (Traditional) – 2:22
9. "Canacao para Geralda (A Song for Geraldine)" (Ramsey Lewis) – 6:17

== Personnel ==
- Ramsey Lewis – piano
- El Dee Young – bass
- Isaac "Redd" Holt – drums
- Josef Paulo – guitar, pandeiro, vocals
- Carmen Costa – cabaça, vocals
