= Ramsey Lewis and his Gentle-men of Jazz =

Studio album by Ramsey Lewis
- Released: 1958
- Recorded: 1958; Chicago
- Genre: Jazz
- Length: 33:57
- Label: Argo; LP 627
- Producer: Holmes "Daddy-O" Daylie

Ramsey Lewis chronology
Ramsey Lewis and his Gentle-men of Swing (1956)	Ramsey Lewis and his Gentle-men of Jazz (1958)	Lem Winchester and the Ramsey Lewis Trio (1958)

Ramsey Lewis and his Gentle-men of Jazz is the second album by American jazz pianist Ramsey Lewis featuring tracks recorded in 1958 and released on the Argo label in the same year.

== Reception ==
Professional ratings
Review scores
Source	Rating
Allmusic	4/5 stars

Allmusic awarded the album 4 stars calling it an "enjoyable trio set".

== Track listing ==
1. "Delilah" (Victor Young) - 5:25
2. "I Get a Kick Out of You" (Cole Porter) - 3:00
3. "Please Send Me Someone to Love" (Percy Mayfield) - 4:02
4. "Brother John" (Traditional) - 4:50
5. "Black Is the Color of My True Love's Hair" (Traditional) - 4:51
6. "It Ain't Necessarily So" (George Gershwin, Ira Gershwin) - 2:44
7. "Seven Valleys" (Dick Katz) - 5:25
8. "On the Street Where You Live" (Alan Jay Lerner, Frederick Loewe) - 3:40

== Personnel ==
- Ramsey Lewis - piano
- El Dee Young - bass
- Redd Holt - drums
