= The Groover =

Live album by Ramsey Lewis
- Released: 1972
- Recorded: October 14–17, 1965
- Venue: Lighthouse Café, Hermosa Beach, California
- Genre: Jazz
- Label: Cadet; CA 50020
- Producer: Esmond Edwards

Ramsey Lewis chronology
Back to the Roots (1971)	The Groover (1972)	The Best of Ramsey Lewis (1972)

The Groover is a live album by the Ramsey Lewis Trio recorded in 1965 at the Lighthouse. The album was eventually released in 1972 on Cadet Records.

== Track listing ==
1. "Summertime" (George Gershwin, Ira Gershwin, DuBose Heyward) - 9:20
2. "Crazy He Calls Me" (Carl Sigman, Bob Russell) - 3:22
3. "Why Don't You Do Right" (Joe McCoy) - 2:52
4. "There Is No Greater Love" (Isham Jones, Marty Symes) - 3:45
5. "Look-A-Here" (Ramsey Lewis) - 7:56
6. "Imagination" (Jimmy Van Heusen, Johnny Burke) - 3:40
7. "Bags' Groove" (Milt Jackson) - 5:05

== Personnel ==
- Ramsey Lewis – piano
- Eldee Young – bass
- Issac "Red" Holt – drums
