= Sam Lazar =

American jazz musician

Sam Lazar (born 1933) was an American pianist and Hammond organist originally from St. Louis, Missouri, United States. A mysterious figure who disappeared from the music scene in the early 1960s, he is best known for fronting a group that included early work from guitarist Grant Green. Lazar's career was heavily influenced by fellow organist Jimmy Smith.

== Early career in music ==
Little is known about Lazar's life, with much of his biographical information coming from the liner notes of his albums. The liner notes on his first LP on Argo Records approximates his birth year as 1933. Initially a pianist, Lazar played in a group led by Ernie Wilkins until Wilkins left St. Louis to join Count Basie. Lazar then had a stint in George Hudson's big band, which also included Clark Terry and Jimmy Forrest at various times. After a tour with alto saxophonist Tab Smith, Lazar served in the United States Army from 1951 to 1953. Upon discharge, he began studying medical technology.

== Transition to organ ==
In 1958, Lazar saw the Jimmy Smith Trio at the 'Peacock Alley' club in St. Louis and was inspired to play the Hammond organ and return to music. His St. Louis-based organ combo later included drummer Chauncey Williams, guitarists Grant Green, Joe Diorio, George Eskridge, and saxophonist Miller Brisker among others. Lazar's group played a variety of gigs from strip clubs to jazz clubs, and was reportedly one of the first interracial combos in the area.

== Recording career ==
Sam Lazar spent a week around Christmas, 1959, playing at the Holy Barbarian nightclub in St. Louis. He performed as part of a quartet with Grant Green, Chauncey Williams, and tenor saxophonist Bob Graf. Their performances at the club were recorded, but went unreleased for decades, until Uptown Records released the material as an album titled Grant Green: The Holy Barbarian, St. Louis 1959, in 2012. Lazar made his first recording to be released a few months later in 1960, a single on Cawthron Records. He signed with Chicago-based Argo Records, a division of Chess Records in 1960, and released his first album, Space Flight later that year. Lazar made a total of three albums for Argo: Space Flight, Playback, and Soul Merchant. Space Flight is most notable because it was recorded in 1960 with bassist Willie Dixon, along with Williams and Green.

Lazar's Argo releases were well received by critics. His first single on Cawthron Records, "Space Flight, Parts 1 and 2", was given a rating of four stars by Billboard, indicating "Very Strong Sales Potential." When "Space Flight" was released as single by Argo, it was named one of the top songs just outside of the Billboard Hot 100 Pop singles. Lazar's 1962 album Playback also received a 4-star rating from Billboard, noting that he played with a lot of blues and soul in a style very similar to Jimmy Smith. The review also stated that he "had the touch to do very well for himself." Despite the positive reviews, Lazar's albums were not commercially successful.

== Discography ==
Singles:

- "Space Flight, Part 1" // "Space Flight, Part 2" (Cawthron 507, released 1960; with guitarist Grant Green)
- "Space Flight" // "Dig A Little Deeper" (Argo 5365, released 1960)
- "I Ain't Mad At You" // "Camp Meetin'" (Argo 5427, released 1962; also issued as Checker 1030)
- "C.C. Rider" // "High Noon" (Argo 5453, released 1963)

Albums:

- Space Flight (Argo LPS-4002, 1960)
- Playback (Argo LPS-4015, 1962)
- Soul Merchant (Argo LPS-717, 1963)
- Grant Green: The Holy Barbarian, St. Louis 1959 (Uptown UPCD-27.68, 2012)
- Organ Grooves: 2 Complete Albums Plus Bonus Tracks (Jasmine JASMCD-2674, 2019) reissue of Argo LPS-4002 and LPS-4015 plus both sides of Cawthron 507.
