= Eugene Pao =

Hong Kong musician

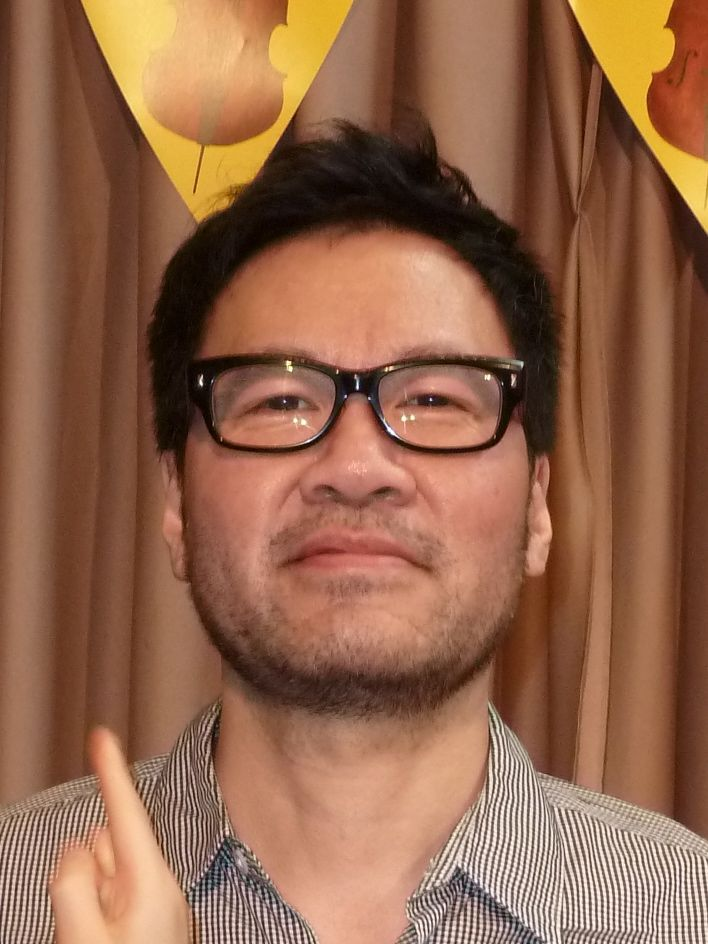
Pao in May 2013

Eugene Pao is a jazz guitarist. He has played with Jeremy Monteiro's group Asiana.
