= Barefoot Sunday Blues =

Studio album by Ramsey Lewis Trio
- Released: 1963
- Recorded: August 20, 1963
- Studios: Van Gelder Studio, Englewood Cliffs, New Jersey
- Genre: Jazz
- Length: 34:45
- Labels: Argo; LP 723
- Producer: Esmond Edwards

Ramsey Lewis chronology
Pot Luck (1963)	Barefoot Sunday Blues (1963)	Bach to the Blues (1964)

Barefoot Sunday Blues is an album by Ramsey Lewis Trio featuring tracks recorded in 1963 and released on the Argo label. The original liner notes were written by Leroi Jones.

== Reception ==
Professional ratings
Review scores
Source	Rating
Allmusic	3/5 stars

Allmusic awarded the album 3 stars.

== Track listing ==
All compositions by Ramsey Lewis except as indicated

1. "Lonely Avenue" (Doc Pomus) - 2:56
2. "Don't Even Kick It Around" - 4:26
3. "Salute to Ray Charles" - 5:51
4. "Barefoot Sunday Blues" (Cannonball Adderley) - 3:35
5. "Island Blues" (Charles Lloyd) - 2:47
6. "I Spend My Life" (Eldee Young) - 3:42
7. "Act Like You Mean It" (Young) - 2:25
8. "Sarah Jane" (Dave Grusin) - 5:20
9. "The Train Won't Wait" - 3:02
10. "Come on Baby" (Lewis, Isaac Holt) - 2:30

== Personnel ==
- Ramsey Lewis – piano
- Eldee Young – bass, cello
- Christopher White – bass (tracks 1 & 7)
- Isaac "Redd" Holt – drums
