= Playback (Sam Lazar album) =

Studio album by Sam Lazar
- Released: 1962
- Recorded: July 1, 1962
- Studio: Tel Mar Studios, Chicago, Illinois
- Genre: Jazz
- Label: Argo

Sam Lazar chronology
Space Flight (1960)	Playback (1962)	Soul Merchant (1962)

Playback is an album by organist Sam Lazar and his Trio, released on the Argo label in 1962.

== Reception ==
Professional ratings
Review scores
Source	Rating
AllMusic	3/5 stars

Allmusic awarded the album 3 stars. A Rovi review stated, "it's a solid organ-based album sure to please fans of the genre... An entertaining album worth the search".

== Track listing ==
All compositions by Sam Lazar except as indicated

1. "Deep"
2. "Long Gone" (Sonny Thompson)
3. "Bags' Groove" (Milt Jackson)
4. "Fuzz Buzz"
5. "Just Make Love to Me" (Willie Dixon)
6. "S.O.S."
7. "Please Send Me Someone to Love" (Percy Mayfield)
8. "Scootin'"

== Personnel ==
- Sam Lazar – organ
- Miller Brisker – tenor saxophone
- Joe Diorio – guitar
- Phillip Wilson – drums

Technical

- Ron Malo - engineer
