= Stretching Out =

Studio album by Ramsey Lewis Trio
- Released: 1960
- Recorded: February 23 & 24, 1960; Chicago
- Genre: Jazz
- Labels: Argo; LP 665
- Producer: Jack Tracy

Ramsey Lewis chronology
An Hour with the Ramsey Lewis Trio (1959)	Stretching Out (1960)	The Ramsey Lewis Trio in Chicago (1960)

Stretching Out is an album by Ramsey Lewis' Trio featuring tracks recorded in 1960 and released on the Argo label.

== Reception ==
Professional ratings
Review scores
Source	Rating
Allmusic	4/5 stars

Allmusic awarded the album 4 stars calling it "among Lewis' strongest from the jazz standpoint, balancing a commercial emphasis on melody with jazz improvising and swinging".

== Track listing ==
All compositions by Ramsey Lewis, Eldee Young and Isaac "Red" Holt except as indicated

1. "Li'l Liza Jane" (Traditional) - 3:13
2. "This Is My Night to Dream" (Johnny Burke, James V. Monaco) - 2:34
3. "Scarlet Ribbons" (Evelyn Danzig, Jack Segal) - 3:32
4. "Here 'Tis" - 2:51
5. "My Ship" (Ira Gershwin, Kurt Weill) - 4:14
6. "Put Your Little Foot Right Out" (Traditional) - 2:55
7. "Solo Para Ti" - 2:56
8. "These Foolish Things" (Harry Link, Eric Maschwitz, Jack Strachey) - 3:37
9. "When the Spirit Moves You" - 3:43
10. "A Portrait of Jennie" (J. Russel Robinson) - 2:30

== Personnel ==
- Ramsey Lewis - piano
- El Dee Young - bass
- Isaac "Redd" Holt - drums
