= More Music from the Soil =

Studio album by Ramsey Lewis Trio
- Released: 1961
- Recorded: February 16 & 17, 1961
- Studios: Ter-Mar Recording Studios, Chicago
- Genre: Jazz
- Length: 41:56
- Labels: Argo; LP 680
- Producer: Jack Tracy

Ramsey Lewis chronology
The Ramsey Lewis Trio in Chicago (1960)	More Music from the Soil (1961)	Never on Sunday (1961)

More Music from the Soil is an album by Ramsey Lewis' Trio featuring tracks recorded in 1961 and released on the Argo label.

== Reception ==
Professional ratings
Review scores
Source	Rating
AllMusic	3/5 stars

Horace Silver, commenting for DownBeat magazine in 1961, said that the piano was badly out of tune and compared Lewis's playing unfavorably with that of Ahmad Jamal. AllMusic awarded the album 3 stars stating "This is a typically enjoyable and accessible early Ramsey Lewis Trio recording".

== Track listing ==
All compositions by Ramsey Lewis, Eldee Young and Isaac "Red" Holt except as indicated

1. "Around the World in 80 Days" (Victor Young) - 3:36
2. "Since I Fell for You" (Buddy Johnson) - 3:56
3. "Hello Cello!" - 3:17
4. "I'll Wait for Your Love" (Elizabeth Davis, Robert Head) - 4:34
5. "Volga Boatmen" (Traditional) - 3:24
6. "Blues for the Night Owl" (Sonny Thompson) - 8:05
7. "Smoke Gets in Your Eyes" (Otto Harbach, Jerome Kern) - 2:45
8. "Autumn in New York" (Vernon Duke) - 4:18
9. "Gonna Set Your Soul on Fire" - 2:01

== Personnel ==
- Ramsey Lewis - piano
- El Dee Young - bass
- Isaac "Redd" Holt - drums
