= With One Voice (album) =

Studio album by Ramsey Lewis
- Released: September 27, 2005
- Recorded: May, 2005 - June, 2005
- Genre: Jazz
- Length: 57:09
- Label: Chicago recording Company; J.W. James Memorial A.M.E. Church, Maywood, IL
- Producer: Ramsey Lewis, Frayne Lewis, Shane Theriot, Robert Carranza

Ramsey Lewis chronology
Urban Knights VI (2004)	With One Voice (2005)	Songs from the Heart: Ramsey Plays Ramsey (2009)

With One Voice is a studio album by American jazz musician Ramsey Lewis, released in 2005 on Narada Records. The album reached No. 12 on the Billboard Top Contemporary Jazz Albums chart and No. 33 on the US Billboard Top Gospel Albums chart.

== Critical reception ==
Professional ratings
Review scores
Source	Rating
AllMusic	4/5 stars

AllMusic's Matt Collar, in a 4/5-star review, called With One Voice "a celebratory mix of gospel standards including 'Oh Happy Day' and 'Pass Me Not' as well as some original compositions by Lewis that mix his distinctive funky style with a gospel aesthetic. This is a joyous album that was clearly born out of spiritual inspiration." Brian Soergel of Jazz Times wrote "You gotta love a Ramsey Lewis CD that begins with 'Oh Happy Day.' In fact, Lewis' first gospel recording in his distinguished career is as uplifting as you'd expect...Lord have mercy, Christian and gospel music can be a sterile thing. But in Lewis' hands it's rollicking and joyful ('Sunday Strut'), reverential ('Bless Me (Prayer of Jabez)') and just plain beautiful (Lewis’' spare duet with Kevin Randolph on keys in 'With One Voice')."

== Track listing ==
No.	Title	Writer(s)	Length
1.	"Oh, Happy Day"		3:15
2.	"Sunday Strut"	Ramsey Lewis/Kevin Randolph	5:28
3.	"Bless Me (Prayer of Jabez)"	Andraé Crouch/Donald Lawrence	4:34
4.	"Thoughts and Reflections"	Ramsey Lewis/Kevin Randolph	7:50
5.	"Pass Me Not"		7:56
6.	"Trees"		6:15
7.	"God Can Work It Out" (featuring Smokie Norful)	Ramsey Lewis/Kevin Randolph	3:55
8.	"My Love for You"	Ramsey Lewis/Kevin Randolph	7:45
9.	"Healed Heart" (featuring Darius Brooks)	Darius Brooks	5:10
10.	"Keep the Spirit"	Frayne Lewis/Ramsey Lewis/Kevin Randolph	5:01
11.	"With One Voice"	Ramsey Lewis/Kevin Randolph

== Personnel ==
- Angel McSwain - Choir/Chorus, Soprano (Vocal)
- Angela D. Weems - Alto (Vocals), Choir/Chorus
- Antoine Curry - Choir/Chorus, Tenor (Vocal)
- Belinda Johnson - Alto (Vocals), Choir/Chorus
- Bobby Broom - Guitar
- Bobby Lewis - Drums
- Brianna Renee Winbush - Alto (Vocals), Choir/Chorus
- Brittany Justine Rideau - Alto (Vocals), Choir/Chorus
- Darius Brooks - Vocals
- David Reilly - Audio Engineer
- Denise Scott & The Soundsmen - Alto (Vocals), Choir/Chorus
- Desmond Gray - Choir/Chorus, Tenor (Vocal)
- Devin Scott - Alto (Vocals), Choir/Chorus
- Donald Lawrence - Director
- Francesca D. Gray - Choir/Chorus, Soprano (Vocal)
- Frayne Lewis - Arranger, Audio Production, Producer
- Gabriel Alexander - Choir/Chorus, Tenor (Vocal)
- Garry Mitchell Jr. - Choir/Chorus, Tenor (Vocal)
- George Washington - Project Coordinator
- Gregory B. Ballard Jr. - Choir/Chorus, Tenor (Vocal)
- Gus Lacy - Choir/Chorus, Tenor (Vocal)
- Gwain Ligon - Choir/Chorus, Soprano (Vocal)
- Heidi Marie Barker - Alto (Vocals), Choir/Chorus
- J. W. James Memorial A.M.E. Combined Choirs - Choir/Chorus
- Jackie Cross - Choir/Chorus, Tenor (Vocal)
- Janelle Lewis - Project Manager
- Jaquari Williams - Bass (Vocal), Choir/Chorus
- Jeff Morrow - Bass (Vocal), Choir/Chorus, Tenor (Vocal)
- Keith Henderson - Guitar
- Kevin Randolph - Keyboards
- Khari Parker - Drums
- Kimberly Bolden - Alto (Vocals), Choir/Chorus
- Kirk Tracy - Trombone
- Lambert Waldrip - Programming
- Larry Gray - Bass, Bass Instrument
- LaVonzelle Minor - Choir/Chorus, Soprano (Vocal)
- Lenwood Robinson - Bass (Vocal), Choir/Chorus
- Leon Joyce Jr. - Drums
- Levi Stewart Sr. - Choir/Chorus, Tenor (Vocal)
- Lisa Gayle Rice - Choir/Chorus, Soprano (Vocal)
- Lynn Hicks - Alto (Vocals), Choir/Chorus
- Mariah Jennings - Choir/Chorus, Soprano (Vocal)
- Matthew Prock - Audio Engineer, Engineer, Mixing
- Maurice Fitzgerald - Bass, Bass Instrument
- Michelle Flowers - Choir/Chorus, Tenor (Vocal)
- Miriam Berry - Choir/Chorus, Soprano (Vocal)
- Myrtis S. Twyman - Choir/Chorus, Tenor (Vocal)
- Orbert Davis - Trumpet
- Phillip Williams - Choir/Chorus, Tenor (Vocal)
- Ramsey Lewis - Arranger, Executive Producer, Piano
- Rev. David A. Berry - Bass (Vocal), Choir/Chorus
- Rev. Greg Ballard - Bass (Vocal), Choir/Chorus
- Rev. Lucille L. Jackson - Liner Notes
- Rhonda D. Winbush - Alto (Vocals), Choir/Chorus
- Rhonda Mitchell - Choir/Chorus, Soprano (Vocal)
- Richard Weems - Bass (Vocal), Choir/Chorus
- Robert Earl Flowers - Choir/Chorus, Tenor (Vocal)
- Rochelle Rideau - Choir/Chorus, Soprano (Vocal)
- Ruben Alvarez - Percussion
- Ruben P. Alvarez - Percussion
- Smokie Norful - Vocals
- Stephen Eisen - Saxophone
- Steve Eisen - Saxophone
- Taiya Little - Alto (Vocals), Choir/Chorus
- Talina J. Parker - Alto (Vocals), Choir/Chorus
- Tracy Kirk - Trombone
- Trevor Sadler - Mastering
- Valerie Brown - Choir/Chorus, Soprano (Vocal)
- Valerie Houston - Alto (Vocals), Choir/Chorus
- Veronica Houston - Choir/Chorus, Soprano (Vocal)
- William Kilgore - Arranger, Organ
- Yvonne Marks - Alto (Vocals), Choir/Chorus
