= Hang On Ramsey! =

Live album by Ramsey Lewis Trio
- Released: 1965
- Recorded: October 14–17, 1965
- Venue: Lighthouse Café, Hermosa Beach, California
- Genre: Jazz
- Label: Cadet; LP 761
- Producer: Esmond Edwards

Ramsey Lewis chronology
The In Crowd (1965)	Hang On Ramsey! (1965)	Wade in the Water (1966)

Hang On Ramsey! is a live album by the Ramsey Lewis Trio which was recorded at the Lighthouse in 1965 and released on the Cadet label.

== Reception ==
Professional ratings
Review scores
Source	Rating
Allmusic	3/5 stars

Scott Yanow of Allmusic awarded the album 3 stars stating "Considering that this album was an obvious follow-up to The In Crowd it is surprising that the music is not more commercial; that would happen in the near future. As it was, pianist Ramsey Lewis (assisted as usual by bassist Eldee Young and drummer Redd Holt) had another big hit in "Hang on Sloopy," and the set (as with the previous one) was recorded at a club before an enthusiastic crowd.

== Track listing ==
1. "A Hard Day's Night" (John Lennon, Paul McCartney) - 4:56
2. "All My Love Belongs to You" (Sol Winkler, Teddy Powell) - 4:10
3. "He's a Real Gone Guy" (Nellie Lutcher) - 2:19
4. "And I Love Her" (Lennon, McCartney) - 5:36
5. "Movin' Easy" (Ramsey Lewis) - 3:00
6. "Billy Boy / Hi-Heel Sneakers" (Traditional / Robert Higgenbotham) - 9:15
7. "The More I See You" (Harry Warren, Mack Gordon) - 4:58
8. "Satin Doll" (Duke Ellington, Billy Strayhorn, Johnny Mercer) - 6:10
9. "Hang On Sloopy" (Bert Russell, Wes Farrell) - 2:40

== Personnel ==
- Ramsey Lewis - piano
- Eldee Young - bass
- Isaac "Redd" Holt - drums
