= Appassionata (album) =

Studio album by Ramsey Lewis
- Released: 1999
- Genre: Jazz
- Label: Narada
- Producer: Ramsey Lewis

Ramsey Lewis chronology
Dance of the Soul (1998)	Appassionata (1999)	Urban Knights III (2000)

Appassionata is an album by American jazz musician Ramsey Lewis, produced by Lewis and released in 1999 on Narada Records. The album peaked at No. 5 on the Billboard Top Jazz Albums chart.

== Critical reception ==
Professional ratings
Review scores
Source	Rating
AllMusic	4/5 stars
The Encyclopedia of Popular Music	4/5 stars
The Penguin Guide to Jazz Recordings	2.5/4 stars

Jonathan Widran of AllMusic noted that "Lewis brings the titular passion to tunes inspired by or taken from opera, classical, jazz, and gospel". Hilarie Grey of JazzTimes declared that "Lewis puts on a clinic of exploratory, dynamic improvisation with Appassionata".

== Track listing ==
No.	Title	Writer(s)	Length
1.	"Pavane"	Gabriel Fauré	5:23
2.	"Nessun Dorma"	Giacomo Puccini	7:14
3.	"A Song for Jan"	Ramsey Lewis	6:42
4.	"E Lucevan Le Stelle"	Giacomo Puccini	6:45
5.	"For the Love of Art"	Ramsey Lewis	3:38
6.	"Vesti la Giubba"	Ruggero Leoncavallo	6:53
7.	"Close Your Eyes and Remember"	Charles Stepney	7:52
8.	"Light Along the Path"	Ramsey Lewis	3:50
9.	"What Wondrous Love This Is"	Ramsey Lewis	7:15
10.	"A Moment Spiritual"	Ramsey Lewis	13:02
