= We Meet Again =

Studio album by Ramsey Lewis and Billy Taylor
- Released: October 16, 1989
- Recorded: 1988–89
- Studio: Master Sound Studios, Astoria, New York
- Genre: Jazz
- Length: 55:55
- Label: Columbia
- Producer: Gary Schultz, Ramsey Lewis

Ramsey Lewis and Billy Taylor chronology
| Classic Encounter (1988) | We Meet Again (1989) | Urban Renewal (1989) |

Professional ratings
Review scores
| Source | Rating |
|---|---|
| AllMusic | 4/5 stars |
| The Encyclopedia of Popular Music | 3/5 stars |
| The Rolling Stone Album Guide | 3/5 stars |

We Meet Again is a jazz album by American jazz pianist Ramsey Lewis and Billy Taylor, released in 1989. Lewis and Taylor duet on songs composed by Taylor, Duke Ellington, Chick Corea, Oscar Peterson, Bill Evans, and Horace Silver, among others.

== Critical reception ==
The Chicago Tribune wrote that "Lewis and Taylor work together elegantly, producing a sound that's big and brassy without being percussive."

Chris Albertson of Stereo Review scribed "Ramsey Lewis's duets with Billy Taylor in "We Meet Again" are well balanced and should appeal to a broad range of tastes. Indeed, while these two pianists continue to pursue individual careers, they seem well on their way to establishing themselves as a team, and their first album together offers a diverse program of compositions by Taylor and fellow pianists John Lewis, Bill Evans, Horace Silver, Denny Zeitlin, Chick Corea, Duke Ellington, and Oscar Peterson.

== Track listing ==
| No. | Title | Writer(s) | Length |
|---|---|---|---|
| 1. | "I'm Just a Lucky So and So" | Duke Ellington | 4:36 |
| 2. | "Django" | John Lewis | 6:20 |
| 3. | "Cookin' at the Continental" | Horace Silver | 4:34 |
| 4. | "Somewhere Soon" | Billy Taylor | 5:40 |
| 5. | "We Meet Again" | Chick Corea | 7:39 |
| 6. | "Quiet Now" | Denny Zeitlin | 7:18 |
| 7. | "Soul Sister" | Billy Taylor | 5:15 |
| 8. | "Waltz for Debby" | Bill Evans | 6:53 |
| 9. | "Nigerian Marketplace" | Oscar Peterson | 7:40 |
| Total length: | | | 55:55 |

== Personnel ==
- Ramsey Lewis – piano
- Billy Taylor – piano
