= Lem Winchester and the Ramsey Lewis Trio =

Studio album by Lem Winchester and the Ramsey Lewis Trio
- Released: 1958
- Recorded: October 8, 1958
- Studio: Chicago
- Genre: Jazz
- Length: 35:31
- Labels: Argo; LP 642
- Producer: Dave Usher

Ramsey Lewis chronology
Ramsey Lewis and his Gentle-men of Jazz (1956)	Lem Winchester and the Ramsey Lewis Trio (1958)	Down to Earth (1958)

Lem Winchester chronology
Lem Winchester and the Ramsey Lewis Trio (1958)	Winchester Special (1959)

Lem Winchester and the Ramsey Lewis Trio (subtitled Perform a Tribute to Clifford Brown) is the debut album by American jazz vibraphonist Lem Winchester and the third album by Ramsey Lewis' Trio featuring tracks associated with trumpeter Clifford Brown recorded in 1958 and released on the Argo label.

== Reception ==
Professional ratings
Review scores
Source	Rating
Allmusic	4/5 stars

Allmusic awarded the album 4 stars stating: "A good example of Ramsey Lewis' original piano style, the little-known set is actually excellent and would be easily recommended to straight-ahead jazz fans if it could be found".

== Track listing ==
All compositions by Clifford Brown, except as indicated

1. "Joy Spring" - 3:25
2. "Where It Is" (Lem Winchester) - 4:27
3. "Sandu" - 6:12
4. "Once in a While" (Michael Edwards, Bud Green) - 5:28
5. "Jordu" (Duke Jordan) - 3:23
6. "It Could Happen to You" (Jimmy Van Heusen, Johnny Burke) - 3:39
7. "Easy to Love" (Cole Porter) - 3:34
8. "A Message from Boysie" (Robert Lowery) - 5:08

== Personnel ==
- Lem Winchester - vibraphone
- Ramsey Lewis - piano
- El Dee Young - bass
- Isaac "Redd" Holt - drums

Technical

- Malcolm Chisholm - recording engineer
- W. Hopkins - cover design
