= An Hour with the Ramsey Lewis Trio =

Studio album by Ramsey Lewis Trio
- Released: 1959
- Recorded: April 22, 1959; Ter-Mar Studios, Chicago
- Genre: Jazz
- Length: 63:59
- Labels: Argo; LP 645
- Producer: Dave Usher

Ramsey Lewis chronology
Down to Earth (1958)	An Hour with the Ramsey Lewis Trio (1959)	Stretching Out (1960)

Professional ratings
Review scores
Source	Rating
AllMusic	2/5 stars
The Encyclopedia of Popular Music	3/5 stars

An Hour with the Ramsey Lewis Trio is an album by Ramsey Lewis' Trio, recorded in 1959 and released on the Argo label.

== Track listing ==
1. "Softly, as in a Morning Sunrise" (Oscar Hammerstein II, Sigmund Romberg) - 7:38
2. "C.C. Rider" (Traditional) - 2:38
3. "Love for Sale" (Cole Porter) - 4:22
4. "I Had the Craziest Dream/I Know Why" (Mack Gordon, Harry Warren/Buddy Bregman, Morgan, Davis) - 6:37
5. "It Ain't Necessarily So" (George Gershwin, Ira Gershwin) - 4:40
6. "I Love Paris" (Porter) - 2:10
7. "The Way You Look Tonight" (Dorothy Fields, Jerome Kern) - 8:07
8. "Song of India" (Nikolai Rimsky-Korsakov) - 2:31
9. "Consider the Source" (Ramsey Lewis, Eldee Young) - 4:00
10. "The Ruby and the Pearl" (Ray Evans, Jay Livingston) - 5:50
11. "Walls of Jericho" (Traditional) - 3:26
12. "Angel Eyes" (Earl Brent, Matt Dennis) - 5:00

== Personnel ==
- Ramsey Lewis - piano
- El Dee Young - bass
- Isaac "Redd" Holt - drums

== Versions ==
- An Hour With The Ramsey Lewis Trio (LP, Album, Mono), Argo Records, US, 1959
- An Hour With The Ramsey Lewis Trio (LP, Album, Blu), Argo Records, US, 1959
- An Hour With The Ramsey Lewis Trio (LP, Album, Gol), Argo Records, US, 1959
- An Hour With The Ramsey Lewis Trio (LP, Album, RE), Cadet Records, Japan, 1983
- An Hour With The Ramsey Lewis Trio (LP, Album, RE), Cadet Records US
- An Hour With The Ramsey Lewis Trio (LP, RE), Cadet Records, US
