= The Ramsey Lewis Trio at the Bohemian Caverns =

Live album by Ramsey Lewis Trio
- Released: 1964
- Recorded: June 4 & 6, 1964
- Venues: Bohemian Caverns, Washington D.C.
- Genre: Jazz
- Labels: Argo; LP 741
- Producer: Esmond Edwards

Ramsey Lewis chronology
Bach to the Blues (1964)	The Ramsey Lewis Trio at the Bohemian Caverns (1964)	More Sounds of Christmas (1964)

The Ramsey Lewis Trio at the Bohemian Caverns is a live album by the Ramsey Lewis Trio which was recorded in 1964 at the Bohemian Caverns nightclub in Washington, D.C., and released on the Argo label.

== Reception ==
Professional ratings
Review scores
Source	Rating
AllMusic	3/5 stars

Thom Jurek of AllMusic stated "Live at the Bohemia Caverns (in Washington, D.C.) was Lewis' second live date, and one that provided a blueprint for the later live dates that would put him near the top of the pop charts a year later with The In Crowd. The material on this set was very ambitious. This is a hip date...and like all of his Argo and Cadet live sides, should be chased down."

== Track listing ==
All compositions by Ramsey Lewis except as indicated

1. "West Side Story Medley: Somewhere/Maria/Jet Song/Somewhere" (Leonard Bernstein, Stephen Sondheim) – 11:58
2. "People" (Jule Styne, Bob Merrill) – 5:15
3. "Something You Got" (Chris Kenner) – 3:30
4. "Fly Me To The Moon (In Other Words)" (Bart Howard) – 6:00
5. "My Babe" (Willie Dixon) – 3:47
6. "The Caves" – 3:10
7. "The Shelter of Your Arms" (Shirley Collie) – 3:40

== Personnel ==
- Ramsey Lewis – piano
- Eldee Young – bass, cello
- Isaac "Redd" Holt – drums
