= The Ramsey Lewis Trio in Chicago =

Live album by Ramsey Lewis Trio
- Released: 1960
- Recorded: April 30, 1960
- Venues: The Blue Note, Chicago
- Genre: Jazz
- Labels: Argo; LP 671
- Producer: Jack Tracy

Ramsey Lewis chronology
| Stretching Out (1960) | The Ramsey Lewis Trio in Chicago (1960) | More Music from the Soil (1961) |

The Ramsey Lewis Trio in Chicago is a live album by Ramsey Lewis Trio, recorded in 1960 and released on the Argo label.

== Reception ==
Professional ratings
Review scores
| Source | Rating |
|---|---|
| AllMusic | 4/5 stars |
| Billboard | (favourable) |

AllMusic wrote: "One of pianist Ramsey Lewis' most satisfying jazz albums of his pre-The In Crowd days... The trio stretches out a little more during the live date than they did in the studio, and they seem inspired by the audience".

== Track listing ==
1. "Old Devil Moon" (Yip Harburg, Burton Lane) – 3:56
2. "What's New?" (Johnny Burke, Bob Haggart) – 4:35
3. "Carmen" (Georges Bizet) – 3:56
4. "Bei Mir Bist du Schön" (Sammy Cahn, Saul Chaplin, Jacob Jacobs, Sholom Secunda) – 3:41
5. "I'll Remember April" (Gene de Paul, Patricia Johnston, Don Raye) – 3:17
6. "Delilah" (Horatio Nicholls) – 4:25
7. "Folk Ballad" (Traditional) – 6:16
8. "But Not for Me" (George Gershwin, Ira Gershwin) – 3:00
9. "C. C. Rider" (Traditional) – 3:51

== Personnel ==
- Ramsey Lewis – piano
- El Dee Young – bass
- Isaac "Redd" Holt – drums
