= Pot Luck (Ramsey Lewis album) =

Studio album by Ramsey Lewis Trio
- Released: 1963
- Recorded: February 27 & 28, 1963
- Studios: Universal Recording Studio, Chicago
- Genre: Jazz
- Length: 41:43
- Labels: Argo; LP 715
- Producer: Esmond Edwards

Ramsey Lewis chronology
| Bossa Nova (1962) | Pot Luck (1963) | Barefoot Sunday Blues (1963) |

Pot Luck is an album performed by the Ramsey Lewis Trio which was recorded in 1963 and released on the Argo label.

== Reception ==
Professional ratings
Review scores
| Source | Rating |
|---|---|
| Allmusic | 2/5 stars |

Allmusic awarded the album 2 stars.

== Track listing ==
All compositions by Ramsey Lewis except as indicated

1. "Andaluza" (Enrique Granados) - 3:20
2. "Look-A-Here" - 4:00
3. "Arrivederci Roma" (Renato Rascel, Carl Sigman) - 5:35
4. "I Gave My Love a Cherry" (Traditional) - 4:45
5. "Loch Lomond" (Traditional) - 3:20
6. "We Blew It, Again!" - 5:10
7. "Nature Boy" (eden ahbez) - 3:15
8. "I Remember the Starlight" (Giacomo Puccini) - 6:10
9. "Shenandoah" (Traditional) - 4:08
10. "Swamp Girl" (Eldee Young) - 2:00

== Personnel ==
- Ramsey Lewis - piano
- Eldee Young - bass
- Isaac "Redd" Holt - drums
