= Vito Price =

American jazz saxophonist

Vito Price (born Vito Pizzo in 1929) is an American jazz saxophonist. He is best known for his album Swingin' the Loop recorded in January 1959, although on-line discographer Tom Lord says in The Jazz Discography that it was recorded in Chicago on 20 January 1958. His second leadership album was 'S Wonderful released in 2003.

== Biography ==
Price was born in 1929 in New York. At the age of 14 he began playing the alto and tenor saxophones. Price played with New York jazz groups while at high school. After leaving high school he played with the bands of Bob Chester, Art Mooney, Tony Pastor, and Chubby Jackson.

In 1951, Price joined the marines, spending two years in the Marine Corps Band. After that, he spent two years studying at the Manhattan Music School. While studying, he played as a part of Jerry Wald's band.

Price moved to Chicago in 1955, joining the WGN station's staff orchestra in 1956. In the same year, he recorded Swingin' the Loop. After releasing the album, Price left WGN and moved back to New York to play with Tony Pastor and Al Cohn, as well as recording multiple albums with Chubby Jackson.

In 1958, Price played as part of a quartet for a Thanksgiving concert at Carnegie Hall. The quartet was accompanying Chris Connor. The act was later invited into Eliot Lawrence's radio show.

Price rejoined Tony Pastor in 1959 to go to Las Vegas. He stayed at the Stardust Hotel during this time. Price stayed in Vegas for 30 years, playing in bands of the time's famous performers. He later moved to Palm Desert where he stayed for another 30 years. During that time, Price played with the likes of Ted Herman, Tony Rose, Pat Rizzo, and Tommy Shepard.

Price recorded his second album in 2003: It’s Wonderful. It was recorded under his birth name Vito Pizzo. He has since retired from playing due to disability.

== Swingin' the Loop ==
Swingin' the Loop (according to the sleeve, or Swinging the Loop according to the label) was released by Argo Records (catalogue number LP 631) with cover art by Don Bronstein. A 7" single was released with Time After Time as the A side, and Swingin' the Loops as side B (Argo Records 5307). The tracks were arranged by Bill McRea.

=== Track list ===
- Swinging The Loop (2:35)
- Mousey's Tune (2:55)
- Why Was I Born? (2:43)
- Duddy (3:25)
- In a Mellow Tone (3:30)
- Eye Strain (2:47)
- Time After Time (2:55)
- Beautiful Love (3:15)
- Credo(3:12)
- As Long as I Live (4:25)

=== Personnel ===
- Vito Price - tenor saxophone
- Lou Levy - piano
- Freddie Green - guitar
- Max Bennett - double bass
- Gus Johnson - drums
