= Don't It Feel Good =

Studio album by Ramsey Lewis
- Released: 1975
- Recorded: 1974–1975
- Genre: Funk, jazz-funk
- Label: Columbia
- Producer: Charles Stepney, Ramsey Lewis

Ramsey Lewis chronology
Sun Goddess (1974)	Don't It Feel Good (1975)	Salongo (1976)

Professional ratings
Review scores
Source	Rating
AllMusic	2.5/5 stars
The Pittsburgh Press	(favourable)
The Rolling Stone Jazz Record Guide	3/5 stars

Don't It Feel Good is a 1975 funk/jazz-funk album by Ramsey Lewis released on Columbia Records. The album peaked at No. 3 on the Billboard Top Jazz Albums chart and No. 5 on the Billboard Top Soul Albums chart.

== Overview ==
The album reunited Lewis with his former producer Charles Stepney. Bassist Cleveland Eaton left for a solo career and was replaced by Tiaz Palmer. As well officially joining Lewis' group were guitarist Byron Gregory alongside percussionist and flutist Derf Reklaw-Raheem, formerly of The Pharaohs, a twosome who previously made guest appearances on Sun Goddess.

== Track listing ==
Side one
No.	Title	Writer(s)	Length
1.	"Don't It Feel Good"	Charles Stepney	5:23
2.	"Juaacklyn"	Morris Stewart	5:03
3.	"What's the Name of This Funk (Spider Man)"	Stepney, Stewart, Derf Reklaw Raheem	3:20
4.	"Something About You"	Stepney, Cash McCall	4:04

Side two
No.	Title	Writer(s)	Length
5.	"That's the Way of the World"	Stepney, Maurice White, Verdine White	5:44
6.	"Fish Bite"	Byron Gregory, Reklaw-Raheem	3:50
7.	"I Dig You"	Stepney, McCall	5:35
8.	"Can't Function"	Stepney, Stewart	3:26

== Credits ==
=== Musicians ===
- Byron Gregory – guitar
- Morris Jennings – drums, tambourine, bells
- Ramsey Lewis – synthesizer, piano, keyboards, clavinet
- Brenda Mitchell-Stewart – vocals
- Tiaz Palmer – bass
- Derf Reklaw-Raheem – flute, conga, tambourine
- Paul Serrano – horn
- Charles Stepney – synthesizer, Moog synthesizer
- Morris Stewart – vocals

=== Production ===
- Paul Serrano – engineer
- Charles Stepney – producer
- Ramsey Lewis – producer

== Charts ==
Chart (1975)	Position
US Top LPs & Tape (Billboard)	46
US Top Soul Albums (Billboard)	5
US Top Jazz Albums (Billboard)	3

=== Singles ===
Year	Single	Chart	Position
1975	"Don't It Feel Good"	Soul Singles	99
1975	"Spider Man"	Dance Music/Club Play	6
