= Young-Holt Unlimited =

U.S. soul and jazz band

Young-Holt Unlimited (also known as Young-Holt Trio), was a U.S. soul and jazz instrumental musical ensemble from Chicago, Illinois, United States.

Drummer Isaac "Redd" Holt and bassist Eldee Young, formerly members of Ramsey Lewis' jazz trio, formed a new outfit called the Young-Holt Trio with pianist Don Walker in 1966. They met with modest success, including the minor hit "Wack-Wack", which charted at number 40 on the Billboard Hot 100 and number 44 in Canada.

In 1968, the group renamed itself Young-Holt Unlimited, and replaced Walker with Ken Chaney. Under their new name, the group scored a number three Hot 100 hit with "Soulful Strut", the backing instrumental track from Barbara Acklin's "Am I the Same Girl”. "Soulful Strut" sold a million copies with the gold record awarded by the RIAA in January 1969, less than three months after the track's release. Follow-up releases failed to match the commercial success of "Soulful Strut", and the group disbanded by 1974, with Young and Holt continuing to play in Chicago small bands. "Who's Making Love" reached number 47 in Canada in March 1969.

The band has been sampled over 200 times, most often in the hip hop genre.

Young died of a heart attack on February 12, 2007, in Bangkok, Thailand, at the age of 71. Holt died on May 23, 2023, a week after his 91st birthday.

== Albums discography ==
- 1966: Wack Wack (as 'Young-Holt Trio') (Brunswick)
- 1967: Feature Spot (as 'Young/Holt') (Cadet) with Ramsey Lewis
- 1967: On Stage (Brunswick)
- 1968: The Beat Goes On (Brunswick)
- 1968: Funky But! (Brunswick)
- 1968: Soulful Strut (Brunswick)
- 1969: Just a Melody (Brunswick)
- 1970: Mellow Dreamin' (Cotillion)
- 1971: Born Again (Cotillion)
- 1973: Oh Girl (Atlantic)
- 1973: Young-Holt Unlimited Plays Super Fly (Paula)
- 1998: Live at the Bohemian Caverns, 1968 (Brunswick)
