= Sun Goddess (album) =

Studio album by Ramsey Lewis
- Released: October 2, 1974
- Recorded: 1973–1974
- Genres: Jazz-funk; jazz pop; jazz fusion
- Length: 36:05 (Original LP)
- Label: Columbia
- Producers: Teo Macero, Ramsey Lewis, Maurice White

Ramsey Lewis chronology
Solar Wind (1974)	Sun Goddess (1974)	Don't It Feel Good (1975)

Professional ratings
Review scores
Source	Rating
AllMusic	4/5 stars
The Rolling Stone Jazz Record Guide	4/5 stars

Sun Goddess is a jazz album by Ramsey Lewis, released on Columbia Records in 1974. The album reached No. 12 on the Billboard Top Pop Albums chart and No. 1 on both the Billboard Top Jazz Albums and Top Soul Albums charts. Sun Goddess was also certified Gold in the US by the RIAA.

== About the album ==
After his classic acoustic albums in the 1960s, Ramsey Lewis wanted to head in a new musical direction in the 1970s. As the mid-70s approached, he reunited with Maurice White, who at that time was with his own band, Earth, Wind & Fire. Members of EW&F including White played on the album sessions, while Philip Bailey added vocals.

The album became a crossover hit, charting at No. 1 on the Billboard R&B and jazz album charts, while peaking at No. 12 on the pop album chart. The tracks, "Hot Dawgit" and "Sun Goddess", charted on the R&B, pop and disco singles charts. Sun Goddess was certified gold by the RIAA.

For years, the identity of the woman on the album cover, photographed by Herb Breuer, had been a mystery among fans, as there was no credit on the album cover. Lewis revealed on his Facebook page in June 2011 that the model was Susan Leigh Scott, now Susan Maxon. Maxon had moved to Seattle, where Lewis was performing during his 2011 Sun Goddess Tour, and decided to attend one of his performances. A photo was taken of the backstage meeting between Lewis and Maxon, which Lewis posted on his page.

== Track listing ==
Side one
No.	Title	Writer(s)	Length
1.	"Sun Goddess"	Jon Lind, Maurice White	8:28
2.	"Living for the City"	Stevie Wonder	5:22
3.	"Love Song"	Ramsey Lewis	5:55

Side two
No.	Title	Writer(s)	Length
4.	"Jungle Strut"	Ramsey Lewis	4:43
5.	"Hot Dawgit"	Charles Stepney, Maurice White	3:03
6.	"Tambura"	Ramsey Lewis	2:55
7.	"Gemini Rising"	Ramsey Lewis	5:54

== Personnel ==
- Philip Bailey - Conga, vocals
- Cleveland Eaton - Bass, bass guitar
- Johnny Graham - Guitar
- Byron Gregory - Guitar
- Maurice Jennings - percussion, conga, drums, tambourine
- Ramsey Lewis - Synthesizer, guitar, piano, electric guitar, electric piano, Fender Rhodes, Wurlitzer, string machine
- Don Myrick - Tenor Saxophone
- Derf Reklaw-Raheem - Conga, drums, vocals
- Charles Stepney - Guitar, electric guitar, Fender Rhodes
- Maurice White - Drums, timbales, vocals
- Verdine White - Bass, vocals

Technical

- Dave Antler - Engineer
- Richard Evans - Horn arrangements, string arrangements

== Charts ==
=== Weekly charts ===
Chart (1975)	Peak position
US Billboard 200	12
US Top R&B/Hip-Hop Albums (Billboard)	1
US Top Jazz Albums (Billboard)	1
Canada Top Albums/CDs (RPM)	50

=== Year-end charts ===
Chart (1975)	Position
US Billboard 200	42
US Top R&B/Hip-Hop Albums (Billboard)	4

=== Singles ===
Year	Single	Chart	Position
1975	Sun Goddess	Billboard Soul Singles	20
1975	Sun Goddess	Billboard Pop Singles	44
1975	Hot Dawgit	Billboard Pop Singles	50
1975	Hot Dawgit	Billboard Soul Singles	61

== See also ==
- List of Billboard number-one R&B albums of 1975
