= More Sounds of Christmas =

Studio album by Ramsey Lewis Trio
- Released: 1964
- Recorded: October 14 & 15, 1964
- Studios: Universal Recording Studios, Chicago
- Genres: Jazz, Christmas
- Labels: Argo; LP 745
- Producer: Esmond Edwards

Ramsey Lewis chronology
The Ramsey Lewis Trio at the Bohemian Caverns (1964)	More Sounds of Christmas (1964)	You Better Believe Me (1964)

More Sounds of Christmas is an album of Christmas music by Ramsey Lewis' Trio featuring tracks recorded in 1964 and released on the Argo label. This album peaked at No. 8 on the US Billboard 200.

== Critical reception ==
Professional ratings
Review scores
Source	Rating
AllMusic	4/5 stars

Dennis Mac Donald of AllMusic gave More Sounds of Christmas a 4 out of 5 stars rating. He proclaimed "Again hampered by strings on too many cuts, on the plus side, this does contain the ultra-cool original, 'Eggnog,' featuring Lewis on celeste".

== Track listing ==
1. "Snowbound" (Clarence Kehner, Russell Faith) – 3:37
2. "The Twelve Days of Christmas" (Traditional) – 2:43
3. "Egg Nog" (Ramsey Lewis) – 3:28
4. "Rudolph the Red-Nosed Reindeer" (Johnny Marks) – 2:30
5. "Jingle Bells" (James Pierpont) – 2:33
6. "Plum Puddin'" (Eldee Young) – 2:58
7. "Snowfall" (Claude Thornhill) – 2:08
8. "We Three Kings" (John Henry Hopkins, Jr.) – 4:01
9. "White Christmas" (Irving Berlin) – 4:22
10. "The Little Drummer Boy" (Katherine Kennicott Davis, Harry Simeone, Henry Onorati) – 2:26

== Personnel ==
- Ramsey Lewis – piano, celeste
- El Dee Young – bass, cello
- Isaac "Redd" Holt (tracks 1, 2, 4, 7 & 10), Steve McCall (tracks 3, 5, 6, 8 & 9) – drums
- Cleveland Eaton – bass (track 5)
- Abe Meltzer, Albert Muenzer, David Chausow, Everett Zlatoff-Mirsky, Harold Kupper, Harold Newton, Henry Ferber, Irving Kaplan, Mark Konrad, Sol A. Bobrov, Theodore Ratzer – string section (tracks 1, 2, 4, 7 & 10)
- Peter Eagle – harp (tracks 1, 2, 4, 7 & 10)
- John Avant – trombone (tracks 1, 2, 4, 7 & 10)
- King Fleming, Will Jackson – arranger (tracks 1, 2, 4, 7 & 10)
