= You Better Believe Me =

Studio album by Ramsey Lewis Trio with Jean DuShon
- Released: 1965
- Recorded: December 19, 1964, and January 14, 1965
- Studios: Universal Recording Studio, Chicago
- Genre: Jazz
- Labels: Argo; LP 750
- Producer: Esmond Edwards

Ramsey Lewis chronology
More Sounds of Christmas (1964)	You Better Believe Me (1965)	The in Crowd (1965)

You Better Believe Me is an album by the Ramsey Lewis Trio, featuring vocalist Jean DuShon on six tracks, which was recorded in late 1964 and early 1965 and released on the Argo label.

== Reception ==
Professional ratings
Review scores
Source	Rating
Allmusic	2/5 stars

Allmusic awarded the album 2 stars.

== Track listing ==
1. "You'd Better Believe Me" (Buddy Johnson) – 2:39
2. "Who Can I Turn To? (Leslie Bricusse, Anthony Newley) – 2:48
3. "Night Time" (Joe Bailey) – 2:45
4. "Something You Got" (Chris Kenner) – 2:44
5. "He Was Too Good to Me" (Richard Rodgers, Lorenz Hart) – 3:26
6. "Goodbye Lover, Hello Friend" (Norman Newell, Michael Carr) – 3:57
7. "Corcovado (Quiet Nights)" (Antonio Carlos Jobim, Gene Lees) – 3:00
8. "Ain't Nobody's Business" (William York) – 3:23
9. "Let It Be Me" (Gilbert Bécaud, Pierre Delanoë, Manny Curtis) – 3:12
10. "It Had Better Be Tonight" (Henry Mancini, Johnny Mercer, Franco Migliacci) – 2:57
11. "My Coloring Book" (John Kander, Fred Ebb) – 4:05
12. "I'm Beginning to See the Light" (Johnny Hodges, Don George, Duke Ellington, Harry James) – 3:04

== Personnel ==
- Ramsey Lewis – piano
- Eldee Young – bass, cello
- Isaac "Redd" Holt – drums
- Jean DuShon – vocals (tracks 1–6)
- Ronald Wilson – alto saxophone, flute (tracks 1–6)
- Roland Faulkner – guitar (tracks 1–6)
- Cleveland Eaton – bass (track 12)
