= The In Crowd (Ramsey Lewis album) =

Live album by Ramsey Lewis Trio
- Released: July 1965
- Recorded: May 13 to 15, 1965
- Venues: Bohemian Caverns, Washington D.C.
- Genre: Jazz
- Length: 32:09
- Labels: Argo; LP 757
- Producer: Esmond Edwards

Ramsey Lewis chronology
You Better Believe Me (1964-65)	The In Crowd (1965)	Hang On Ramsey! (1965)

The In Crowd is a live album by the Ramsey Lewis Trio, recorded in 1965 at the Bohemian Caverns nightclub in Washington, D.C., and released on the Argo label.

== Background ==
The album provided Lewis with his biggest hit, reaching the top position on the Billboard R&B Chart and No. 2 on their top 200 albums chart in 1965, and the title track single "The 'In' Crowd" reached No. 2 on the R&B Chart and No. 5 on the Hot 100 singles chart in the same year.

== Critical reception ==
Professional ratings
Review scores
Source	Rating
AllMusic	4.5/5 stars
The Penguin Guide to Jazz Recordings	3.5/4 stars
Record Mirror	3/5 stars
The Rolling Stone Album Guide	3.5/5 stars

Michael G. Nastos of AllMusic praised the album. As he proclaimed "this is the moment where Lewis shined the brightest, the 'in crowd' at the club was verbally into it, and the time for this music was right".

=== Accolades ===
The In Crowd won a Grammy in 1966 for Best Instrumental Jazz Performance by an Individual or Group. As well the album's title track single was Grammy nominated for Record of the Year. In 2009 this said song was eventually inducted into the Grammy Hall of Fame.

== Track listing ==
1. "The 'In' Crowd" (Billy Page) - 5:50
2. "Since I Fell for You" (Buddy Johnson) - 4:06
3. "Tennessee Waltz" (Pee Wee King, Redd Stewart) - 5:02
4. "You Been Talkin' 'Bout Me Baby" (Gale Garnett, Ray Rivers) - 3:01
5. "Spartacus (Love Theme from)" (Alex North) - 7:17
6. "Felicidade (Happiness)" (Antônio Carlos Jobim, Vinicius de Moraes) - 3:29
7. "Come Sunday" (Duke Ellington) - 4:50

== Personnel ==
- Ramsey Lewis – piano
- Eldee Young – bass, cello
- Isaac "Redd" Holt – drums

== See also ==
- List of Billboard number-one R&B albums of the 1960s
