= Space Flight (album) =

Studio album by Sam Lazar
- Released: 1960
- Recorded: June 1, 1960
- Studio: Ter-Mar Recording Studios, Chicago, Illinois
- Genre: Jazz
- Length: 32:46
- Label: Argo; LPS-4002
- Producer: Max Cooperstein

Sam Lazar chronology
Space Flight (1960)	Playback (1962)

Space Flight is an album recorded by organist Sam Lazar on June 1, 1960 for Argo Records. This was Lazar's debut recording, and the second recording by guitarist Grant Green.

== Reception ==
Professional ratings
Review scores
Source	Rating
Allmusic	3/5 stars

Allmusic awarded the album 3 stars.

== Track listing ==
All compositions by Sam Lazar and E. Rodney Jones; except where noted.

1. "Dig A Little Deeper" – 3:46
2. "We Don't Know" – 2:51
3. "Caramu" – 3:41
4. "Ruby" (Mitchell Parish, Heinz Roemheld) – 3:56
5. "Gigi Blues" – 4:01
6. "Space Flight" – 2:39
7. "Mad Lad" – 2:16
8. "Funky Blues" – 2:31
9. "Big Willie" [originally known as "Space Flight, Part 2"] – 3:22
10. "My Babe" (Willie Dixon) – 4:12

== Personnel ==
- Sam Lazar – organ
- Grant Green – guitar
- Willie Dixon – bass
- Chauncey Williams – drums

Technical

- Ron Malo - engineer
- U.S. Army - cover photography
