= Between the Keys =

Studio album by Ramsey Lewis
- Released: 1996
- Genre: Jazz, smooth Jazz
- Label: GRP
- Producer: Frayne Lewis

Ramsey Lewis chronology
Sky Islands (1993)	Between the Keys (1996)	Dance of the Soul (1998)

Between the Keys is a studio album by Ramsey Lewis released in 1996 on GRP Records. The album rose to No. 17 on the Billboard Top Contemporary Jazz Albums chart.

== Critical reception ==
Professional ratings
Review scores
Source	Rating
AllMusic	2/5 stars

Scott Yanow of AllMusic described the album as "A strictly commercial effort that succeeds more as dance music than as creative jazz."

== Track listing ==
No.	Title	Writer(s)	Length
1.	"Sun Goddess 2000"	Jon Lind, Maurice White	7:29
2.	"Cold And Windy"	Frayne Lewis, Ramsey Lewis, Joe Sample	5:50
3.	"I'll Always Be With You"	Frayne Lewis, Robert Lewis	3:50
4.	"Secret Place"	Frayne Lewis, Ramsey Lewis, Robert Lewis	4:31
5.	"Between The Keys"	Gary Haase, Bob Ward	4:02
6.	"Les Fleur"	Charles Stepney	5:12
7.	"Just A Little Lovin"	Michael Logan	5:44
8.	"Hearts Of Fire"	Frayne Lewis, Ramsey Lewis, Joe Sample	6:08
9.	"All Around the World"	Frayne Lewis, Ramsey Lewis, Kevin Randolph	4:10
10.	"I'll Always Be About You" (remix)	Frayne Lewis, Robert Lewis	4:41
