= Joanie Pallatto =

American jazz musician

Joanie Pallatto is a singer and composer from Xenia, Ohio.

== Biography ==
Joanie Pallatto was born to a father who played violin and a mother who played guitar. When she was four years old, she began to learn violin, then moved to clarinet. In school she sang in the choir, where she discovered her passion for singing. She attended the Cincinnati College Conservatory of Music and was introduced to the music of Chick Corea and Miles Davis and vocalists Betty Carter, Bob Dorough, Cleo Laine, Mark Murphy, and Annie Ross. In the 1970s she went on tour with the Glenn Miller orchestra. In 1979, she moved to Chicago. She married pianist and composer Bradley Parker-Sparrow and founded the label Southport Records. Described by Rick Kogan of the Chicago Tribune as having “a stirring and special voice,” Pallatto has expertise in all aspects of musical production. As a solo singer, group singer and voiceover talent, she has recorded on hundreds of radio and television commercials nationally. As a jazz vocalist, Pallatto has performed at Chicago clubs City Winery, Andy's and The Green Mill and New York venues the Iridium Jazz Club, Pangea and Birdland. Concert engagements have included Chicago Jazz Festival, Chicago Cultural Center, The Old Town School of Folk Music, Park West, Stage 773 and Bailiwick Theater; she was also a featured soloist with Daniel Barenboim in 'Ellington Among Friends' at Symphony Center.

== Awards and honors ==
- Jazz Hero Award, Jazz Journalists Association, 2016
- Lifetime Achievement Award for Extra-Ordinary Contributions to the Music Industry, 2021 Martin's International in the 39th Annual Chicago Music Awards

== Discography ==
- Whisper Not (Southport, 1986)
- Who Wrote This Song? (Southport, 1994)
- Passing Tones (Southport, 1995)
- Fire with Von Freeman (1996)
- Two with Marshall Vente (Southport, 1997)
- Words & Music (Southport, 1999)
- The King and I with King Fleming (Southport, 2000)
- We Are Not Machines (Southport, 2002)
- Canned Beer (Southport, 2003)
- It's Not Easy (Southport, 2008)
- As You Spend Your Life (Southport, 2011)
- Days with Joanie and Sparrow (Southport, 2013)
- Two Again with Marshall Vente (Southport, 2015)
- Float Out to Sea (Southport, 2017)
- My Original Plan (Southport, 2021)
- Accidental Melody (Southport, 2023)
- April & Joanie Sing! with April Aloisio and Joanie Pallatto (Southport, 2024)
- SONG with Joanie Pallatto and Bradley Parker-Sparrow (Southport, 2025)
