= Jean DuShon =

American singer and stage actor (1935–2019)

- Also known as: Anna Jean Atwell
- Born: Anna Jean Harris; August 16, 1935; Detroit, Michigan, United States
- Died: July 19, 2019 (aged 83) Stone Mountain, Georgia, U.S.
- Genres: Jazz, R&B
- Occupations: Singer, actor, songwriter
- Instrument: Vocals
- Years active: 1950s–1992
- Labels: ABC-Paramount; Atco; OKeh; Lennox; Argo; Cadet

Jean DuShon (born Anna Jean Harris, later Atwell, August 16, 1935 – July 19, 2019) was an American jazz and R&B singer, and stage actor. She was best known for her recordings in the 1960s, including the first released recording of the song "For Once in My Life" in 1966, although many had not heard her version and assumed the original recording was by Stevie Wonder.

== Biography ==
Born in Detroit, Michigan, she sang in church as a child, and later entered and won local talent contests. She turned professional at 15, and began performing in nightclubs. She was influenced by such stars Billie Holiday and Dinah Washington, and on one occasion was confronted by an angry Washington who accused her of copying her. She studied at the Detroit Conservatory, and attracted the attention of music business agent John Levy, the manager of singer Nancy Wilson. He won DuShon singing engagements across the US, and after he and Wilson had a row vowed that he would make DuShon a bigger star than she was. However, she then married Freddie Atwell, who became her manager, and they relocated to New York City.

DuShon then joined Cootie Williams' band as featured vocalist, before being spotted by Ahmet Ertegun of Atlantic Records, who paired her with young producer Phil Spector. They recorded a version of Little Willie John's "Talk to Me, Talk to Me" on Atco in 1961, but it was unsuccessful. DuShon then recorded singles with various labels including Lennox, OKeh and Columbia, before joining Chess Records in 1964. There she recorded three albums. The first, Make Way for Jean DuShon, was recorded with the Lou Donaldson quintet and was released on the Argo subsidiary label in 1964. It was followed by You Better Believe Me, with the Ramsey Lewis Trio, in 1965, and finally Feeling Good, again with Donaldson and arranged by Oliver Nelson, on the Cadet label in 1966.

While with Cadet, she was contacted by Motown songwriter Ron Miller, with a song he had co-written, "For Once in My Life". She recorded the song, with arrangement by Bart Keyes and production by Esmond Edwards. The single was issued by Cadet in October 1966, became a local hit, and has been described as "a beauty, capped by soaring modulations that glimmer with the hopefulness of love". However, on hearing it and discovering that Miller was the co-writer, Berry Gordy asked Chess not to promote it, and had the song recorded by Connie Haines, Barbara McNair, and later Stevie Wonder whose recording became a worldwide hit. After one further single, DuShon then left Chess and did not record subsequently. She later said of the failure of "For Once in My Life":

It was a very big disappointment in my life. I stopped singing it 'cause I didn't have the song. I didn't have anything. It wasn't mine anymore.

However, she performed as a jazz singer in many leading New York clubs during the late 1960s and 1970s. She also sang and toured with Lloyd Price and Fats Domino, performed in clubs with Ray Charles, sang with Count Basie, and appeared at the 1967 New Jersey Jazz Festival. Encouraged by actor Dick Anthony Williams, she also began working in off-Broadway and, later, Broadway theater productions including What the Wine Sellers Buy, and with Cab Calloway in Bubbling Brown Sugar. She also performed in Blues in the Night, which was nominated for a Tony Award, and replaced Odetta in Little Dreamer: A Night in the Life of Bessie Smith. In 1991, she toured in Europe, performing at a gala concert King Hussein of Jordan, and in 1992 performed at a gala for President-elect Bill Clinton.

Under her married name of Anna Atwell, she died in Stone Mountain, Georgia on July 19, 2019, aged 83.

== Discography ==
=== Albums ===
- Make Way for Jean DuShon (Argo, 1964)
- You Better Believe Me (with the Ramsey Lewis Trio, Argo, 1965)
- Feeling Good (Cadet, 1966)

=== Singles ===
- "Is It Wrong to Be Right" (ABC-Paramount, 1960)
- "Talk to Me, Talk to Me" (Atco, 1961)
- "Play Thing" (OKeh, 1962)
- "Look the Other Way" (Lennox, 1963)
- "More (Theme from 'Mondo Cane')" (with the Ramsey Lewis Trio, Argo, 1965)
- "Feeling Good" (Argo, 1965)
- "Out in the Cold Again" (Cadet, 1966)
- "For Once in My Life" (Cadet, 1966)
- "As I Watch You Walk Away" (Cadet, 1966)
