= Ramsey Lewis =

American jazz pianist and composer (1935–2022)

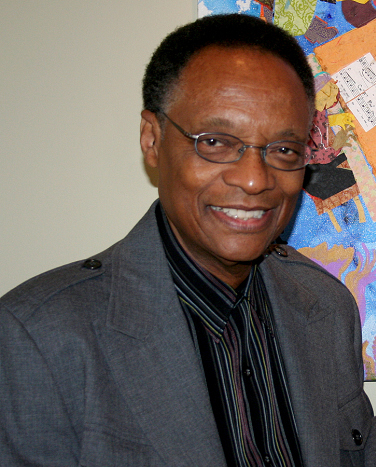
- Lewis in 2009

Background information
- Born: Ramsey Emmanuel Lewis Jr. May 27, 1935; Chicago, Illinois, U.S.
- Died: September 12, 2022 (aged 87) Chicago, Illinois, U.S.
- Genres: Jazz; jazz-funk; pop
- Occupations: Composer; pianist; radio personality
- Instrument: Piano
- Years active: 1955–2022
- Labels: Cadet; Columbia; GRP; Narada; Concord; Hidden Beach
- Website: www.ramseylewis.com

Ramsey Emmanuel Lewis Jr. (May 27, 1935 – September 12, 2022) was an American jazz pianist, composer, and radio personality. Lewis recorded over 80 albums and received five gold records and three Grammy Awards in his career. His album The In Crowd earned Lewis critical praise and the 1965 Grammy Award for Best Jazz Performance. His best known singles include "The 'In' Crowd", "Wade in the Water", and "Sun Goddess". Until 2009, he was the host of the Ramsey Lewis Morning Show on the Chicago radio station WNUA.

Lewis was also active in musical education in Chicago. He founded the Ramsey Lewis Foundation, established Ravinia's Jazz Mentor Program, and served on the board of trustees for the Merit School of Music and The Chicago High School for the Arts.

== Life and career ==
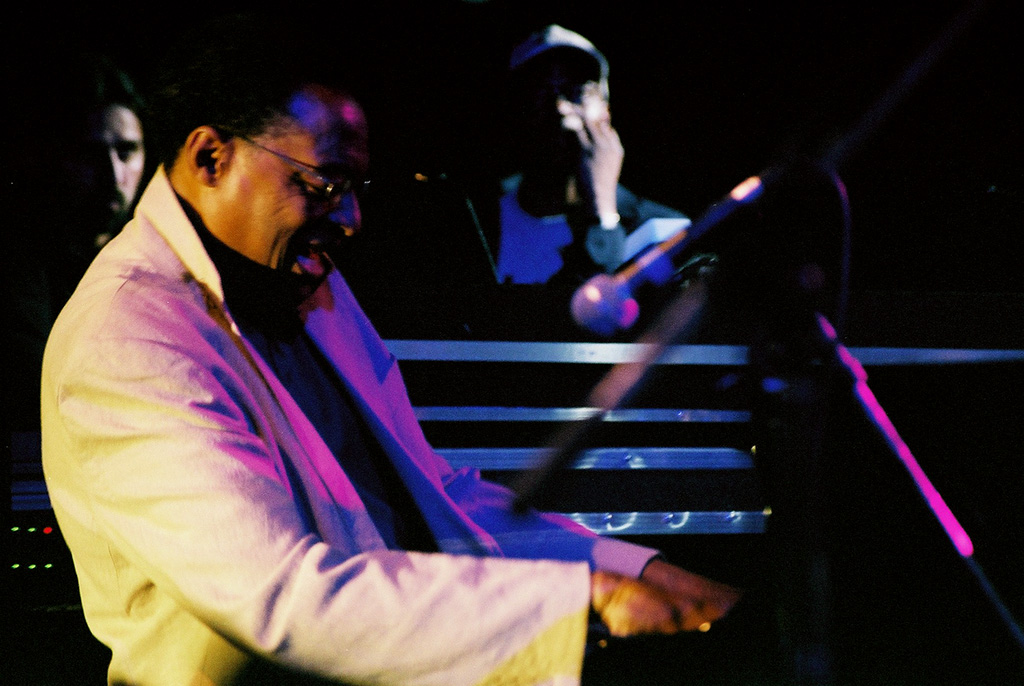
Lewis performing at JazzFe 2006

Ramsey Emmanuel Lewis Jr. was born on May 27, 1935, in Chicago to Ramsey Emmanuel Lewis and Pauline Lewis. He grew up in the Cabrini–Green Homes Housing Projects, an area native to soul singers Curtis Mayfield and Jerry Butler. Both of his parents came from the Deep South. His father was a church choir director who encouraged him to study music. Thus, Lewis began taking piano lessons at the age of four with Ernestine Bruce, the church pianist and organist. When he was 11, Bruce recommended he study with Dorothy Mendelssohn at the Chicago Musical College. Mendelssohn taught him classical technique with the philosophy that "it freed the performer from the thinking about the notes so he could concentrate on the music." Lewis realized what she meant when he saw Wynton Kelly with the Miles Davis group, Kelly asked him to play something, and Kelly complimented him by saying "Boy, I wish I had technique."

As a young man, Lewis played with a number of local ensembles, such as Edward Virgil Abner's Knights of Music. Lewis would eventually join a jazz group called the Clefs. He later formed the Ramsey Lewis Trio with drummer Isaac "Redd" Holt and bassist Eldee Young. They eventually signed to Chess Records.

In 1956, the trio released their debut album, Ramsey Lewis and his Gentle-men of Swing.

Following their 1965 hit, "The 'In' Crowd" (the single reached No. 5 on the pop charts, and the album No. 2), they concentrated more on pop material. Young and Holt left in 1966 to form Young-Holt Unlimited and were replaced by Cleveland Eaton and Maurice White. White left to form Earth, Wind & Fire and was replaced by Morris Jennings in 1970. Later, Frankie Donaldson and Bill Dickens replaced Jennings and Eaton; Felton Crews also appeared on Lewis' 1981 album Three Piece Suite.

By 1966, Lewis was one of the nation's most successful jazz pianists, having had hits with "The In Crowd", "Hang On Sloopy", and "Wade in the Water." All three singles each sold over one million copies and were awarded gold discs. In the 1970s, Lewis often played electric piano, although by later in the decade he was sticking to acoustic piano and using an additional keyboardist in his groups.

In addition to recording and performing, Lewis hosted the weekly syndicated radio program Legends of Jazz, created in 1990, syndicated by United Stations Radio Networks. He also hosted the Ramsey Lewis Morning Show on Chicago "smooth jazz" radio station WNUA (95.5 FM). In December 2006, this morning show became part of Broadcast Architecture's Smooth Jazz Network, simulcasting on other smooth jazz stations across the country until its cancellation in May 2009, when WNUA switched over to a Spanish format.

Ramsey founded the Ramsey Lewis Foundation, which promoted musical instrument education to children, in 2005.

In 2006, a well-received 13-episode Legends of Jazz television series hosted by Lewis was broadcast on public TV nationwide and featured live performances by a variety of jazz artists including Larry Gray, Dr. Lonnie Smith, Joey Defrancesco, Dave Brubeck, Chick Corea, Kurt Elling, Benny Golson, Pat Metheny and Tony Bennett.

Lewis was artistic director of Jazz at Ravinia (an annual feature at the Ravinia Festival in Highland Park, Illinois) and helped organize Ravinia's Jazz Mentor Program. Ramsey also served on the board of trustees for the Merit School of Music and The Chicago High School for the Arts.

== Distinctions, honors, awards ==
Lewis was an honorary member of Phi Beta Sigma fraternity. In May 2008, Lewis received an honorary doctorate from Loyola University Chicago upon delivering the keynote address at the undergraduate commencement ceremony.

In January 2007, the Dave Brubeck Institute invited Lewis to join its Honorary Board of Friends at the University of the Pacific in Stockton, California. Lewis was an Honorary Board member of the Chicago Jazz Orchestra.

== Personal life ==
From 1954 to 1988, Lewis was married to Geraldine Taylor (1935–2005), with whom he had seven children. In 1990, he married Jan Tamillow.

Lewis died in his sleep at his Chicago home on September 12, 2022, at age 87.

== Discography ==
=== Albums ===
Year	Title	Peak chart positions				Label
Year	Title	US	US R&B	US Jazz	UK	Label
1956	Ramsey Lewis and his Gentle-men of Swing	―	―	―	―	Argo
1958	Ramsey Lewis and his Gentle-men of Jazz, Volume 2	―	―	―	―	Argo
1958	Lem Winchester and the Ramsey Lewis Trio	―	―	―	―	Argo
1959	Down to Earth (The Ramsey Lewis Trio Plays Music from the Soil)	―	―	―	―	EmArcy
1959	An Hour with the Ramsey Lewis Trio	―	―	―	―	Argo
1960	Early in the Morning (Lorez Alexandria with the Ramsey Lewis Trio)	―	―	―	―	Argo
1960	Stretching Out	―	―	―	―	Argo
1960	The Ramsey Lewis Trio in Chicago	―	―	―	―	Argo
1961	More Music from the Soil	―	―	―	―	Argo
1961	Never on Sunday	―	―	―	―	Argo
1961	Sound of Christmas	129	―	―	―	Argo
1962	The Sound of Spring	―	―	―	―	Argo
1962	Country Meets the Blues	―	―	―	―	Argo
1962	Bossa Nova	―	―	―	―	Argo
1963	Pot Luck	―	―	―	―	Argo
1963	Barefoot Sunday Blues	―	―	―	―	Argo
1964	Bach to the Blues	125	―	―	―	Argo
1964	The Ramsey Lewis Trio at the Bohemian Caverns	103	―	―	―	Argo
1964	More Sounds of Christmas	8	―	―	―	Argo
1965	You Better Believe Me (with Jean DuShon)	―	―	―	―	Argo
1965	The In Crowd	2	1	―	―	Argo
1965	Hang On Ramsey!	15	4	―	20	Cadet
1965	Choice! The Best of the Ramsey Lewis Trio (compilation)	54	9	―	―	Cadet
1966	Wade in the Water	16	2	―	―	Cadet
1966	The Movie Album	124	5	―	―	Cadet
1966	Goin' Latin	95	16	2	―	Cadet
1967	Dancing in the Street	59	16	3	―	Cadet
1967	Up Pops Ramsey Lewis	52	25	7	―	Cadet
1968	Maiden Voyage	55	14	3	―	Cadet
1968	Mother Nature's Son	156	10	3	―	Cadet
1968	Ramsey Lewis Live in Tokyo	―	―	―	―	Cadet
1969	Encore! Ramsey Lewis in Tokyo (Vol. 2)	―	―	―	―	Chess/Victor (Japan)
1969	Another Voyage	139	34	5	―	Cadet
1969	The Piano Player	157	―	9	―	Cadet
1970	Them Changes	177	34	4	―	Cadet
1971	Back to the Roots	163	25	3	―	Cadet
1972	The Groover	―	―	―	―	Cadet
1972	The Best of Ramsey Lewis (compilation)	172	―	5	―	Cadet
1972	Upendo Ni Pamoja	79	9	1	―	Columbia
1973	Funky Serenity	117	―	4	―	Columbia
1973	Ramsey Lewis' Newly Recorded All-Time Non-Stop Golden Hits	198	50	32	―	Columbia
1974	Solar Wind	―	―	29	―	Columbia
1974	Sun Goddess	12	1	1	―	Columbia
1974	Solid Ivory	―	―	―	―	Cadet
1975	Don't It Feel Good	46	5	3	―	Columbia
1976	Salongo	77	17	7	―	Columbia
1977	Love Notes	79	31	7	―	Columbia
1977	Tequila Mockingbird	111	―	3	―	Columbia
1978	Legacy	149	―	10	―	Columbia
1979	Ramsey	―	―	21	―	Columbia
1980	Routes	173	51	7	―	Columbia
1981	Blues for the Night Owl	―	―	―	―	Columbia
1981	Three Piece Suite	152	52	10	―	Columbia
1982	Ramsey Lewis Live at the Savoy	―	50	12	―	Columbia
1982	Chance Encounter	―	―	16	―	Columbia
1983	Les Fleurs	―	―	10	―	Columbia
1983	Reunion	―	―	―	―	Columbia
1984	The Two of Us (with Nancy Wilson)	146	42	5	―	Columbia
1985	Fantasy	―	―	―	―	Columbia
1987	Keys to the City	―	―	22	―	Columbia
1988	Classic Encounter	―	―	―	―	Columbia
1989	We Meet Again (with Billy Taylor)	―	―	―	―	Columbia
1989	Urban Renewal	―	―	―	―	Columbia
1992	Ivory Pyramid	―	―	7	―	GRP
1993	Sky Islands	―	―	4	―	GRP
1995	Urban Knights I	―	―	―	―	GRP
1996	Between the Keys	―	―	17	―	GRP
1997	Urban Knights II	―	―	―	―	GRP
1998	Dance of the Soul	―	―	11	―	GRP
1999	Appassionata	―	―	5	―	Narada
2000	Urban Knights III	―	―	―	―	Narada
2001	Urban Knights IV	―	―	―	―	Narada
2002	Meant to Be (with Nancy Wilson)	―	―	3	―	Narada
2003	Urban Knights V	―	―	―	―	Narada
2003	Simple Pleasures (with Nancy Wilson)	―	―	9	―	Narada
2004	Time Flies	―	―	10	―	Narada
2005	Urban Knights VI	―	―	―	―	Narada
2005	With One Voice	―	―	12	―	Narada
2009	Songs from the Heart: Ramsey Plays Ramsey	―	―	―	―	Concord
2011	Taking Another Look	―	―	13	―	Hidden Beach
2019	Urban Knights VII	―	―	―	―	Ropeadope
2021	Manha de Carnaval	―	―	―	―	Above Ground
2022	The Beatles Songbook	―	―	―	―	Steele
"—" denotes releases that did not chart or were not released in that territory.

=== Singles ===
Year	Title	Peak chart positions					Certifications
Year	Title	US Pop	US R&B	US Dance	CAN	UK	Certifications
1964	"Something You Got" (as the Ramsey Lewis Trio)	63	―	―	―	―	
1965	"The 'In' Crowd" (as the Ramsey Lewis Trio)	5	2	―	6	―	BPI: Silver
1965	"Jingle Bells" (as the Ramsey Lewis Trio)	21	―	―	―	―	
1965	"Hang On Sloopy" (as the Ramsey Lewis Trio)	11	6	―	37	―	
1966	"Winter Wonderland"	23	―	―	―	―	
1966	"Wade in the Water"	19	3	―	32	31	
1966	"Up Tight"	49	30	―	50	―	
1966	"Hi-Heel Sneakers"	70	―	―	―	―	
1966	"A Hard Day's Night"	29	―	―	11	―	
1967	"Soul Man"	49	―	―	64	―	
1967	"One, Two, Three"	67	―	―	―	―	
1967	"Day Tripper"	74	―	―	―	―	
1967	"Dancing in the Street"	84	―	―	―	―	
1968	"Since You've Been Gone"	98	―	―	100	―	
1969	"Julia"	76	37	―	―	―	
1972	"Slipping into Darkness"	―	44	―	―	―	
1973	"Kufanya Mapenzi (Making Love)"	93	―	―	―	―	
1975	"Sun Goddess" (with Earth, Wind & Fire)	44	20	5	―	―	
1975	"Hot Dawgit" (with Earth, Wind & Fire)	50	61	―	―	―	
1976	"What's the Name of This Funk (Spider Man)"	69	50	6	―	―	
1976	"Don't It Feel Good"	—	99	―	―	―	
1976	"Brazilica"	—	88	―	―	―	
1977	"Spring High"	—	85	―	―	―	
1981	"So Much More"	—	93	―	―	―	
1982	"You Never Know"	—	64	―	―	―	
1985	"This Ain't No Fantasy"	—	88	48	―	―	
1987	"7–11"	—	67	―	―	―	
"—" denotes releases that did not chart or were not released in that territory.

=== As sideman ===
With Max Roach

- MAX (Argo, 1958)

With Jimmy Woode

- The Colorful Strings of Jimmy Woode (Argo, 1957)

With Young/Holt

- Feature Spot (Cadet, 1967)

== Awards and recognitions ==
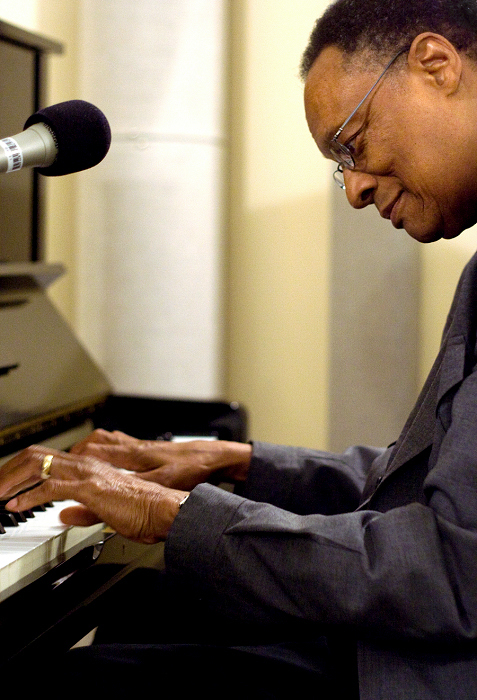
Lewis performing live in the KPLU studio in October 2009

The Grammy Awards are bestowed annually by the National Academy of Recording Arts and Sciences. Lewis has received three awards out of four nominations.

=== Grammy history ===
Year	Category	Title	Genre	Label	Result	Source
1965	Best Jazz Performance – Small Group or Soloist with Small Group	The In Crowd	Jazz	Argo/Chess	Won	
1965	Record of the Year	"The 'In' Crowd"		Argo/Chess	Nominated	
1966	Best Rhythm & Blues Group Performance – Vocal or Instrumental	"Hold It Right There"	R&B	Chess	Won	
1973	Best Rhythm & Blues Instrumental Performance	"Hang On Sloopy"	R&B	MCA	Won	

=== Certifications ===
Albums
Year	Title	Certification	Label	Source
1965	The In Crowd	US RIAA: Gold	Argo	
1966	Hang On Ramsey!	US RIAA: Gold	Cadet	
1966	Wade in the Water	US RIAA: Gold	Cadet	
1968	Sound of Christmas	US RIAA: Gold	Argo	
1975	Sun Goddess	US RIAA: Gold	Columbia	

=== Recognition ===
- 1997: Ramsey Lewis was inducted as a Laureate of The Lincoln Academy of Illinois and awarded the Order of Lincoln (the state's highest honor) by the Governor of Illinois in the area of The Performing Arts.
- 2002: Lewis participated in the 2002 Winter Olympics torch relay, lighting the cauldron for its brief stop in Chicago.
- 2004: NAACP Image Award for Outstanding Jazz Artist.
- 2006: 22nd Annual Stellar Gospel Music Awards, Best Gospel Instrumental Album, (With One Voice)
- 2007: National Endowment for the Arts, Jazz Masters Award
- 2007: Landmarks Illinois, Legendary Landmark Award, as one of living treasures of Illinois. "Just like our landmarked buildings, our three Legendary Landmarks have been critical to the civic well-being of Chicago and stand as a testimony to the greatness of our cultural integrity" said David Bahlman, president of Landmarks Illinois.
