= Never on Sunday (album) =

Studio album by Ramsey Lewis Trio
- Released: 1961
- Recorded: August 10 & 11, 1961
- Studios: Universal Recording Studios, Chicago
- Genre: Jazz
- Labels: Argo; LP 686
- Producer: Leonard Chess

Ramsey Lewis chronology
More Music from the Soil (1961)	Never on Sunday (1961)	Sound of Christmas (1961)

Never on Sunday is an album by Ramsey Lewis' Trio featuring tracks recorded in 1961 and released on the Argo label.

== Reception ==
Professional ratings
Review scores
Source	Rating
Allmusic	3/5 stars

Scott Yanow of Allmusic awarded the album 3 stars stating "Pianist Ramsey Lewis, bassist Eldee Young, and drummer Red Holt had one of the most popular groups in jazz of the era, playing soulful and melodic versions of standards that were both swinging and accessible".

== Track listing ==
1. "The Ripper" (Ramsey Lewis) - 2:00
2. "I Got Plenty of Nothing'" (George Gershwin, Ira Gershwin, DuBose Heyward) - 3:39
3. "Water Boy" (Traditional) - 3:00
4. "Thanks for the Memory" (Ralph Rainger, Leo Robin) - 3:32
5. "Cielito Lindo" (Traditional) - 2:35
6. "You Just Don't Care" (El Dee Young) - 3:08
7. "Never on Sunday" (Manos Hadjidakis) - 2:10
8. "You've Changed" (Bill Carey, Carl Fischer) - 4:09
9. "The Breeze and I" (Ernesto Lecuona, Al Stillman) - 2:36
10. "Exactly Like You" (Dorothy Fields, Jimmy McHugh) - 2:34

== Personnel ==
- Ramsey Lewis - piano
- El Dee Young - bass
- Isaac "Redd" Holt - drums
