= Argo Records =

American record label

- Parent company: Chess Records
- Founded: 1955
- Founder: Leonard Chess; Phil Chess
- Defunct: 1965
- Status: Inactive
- Genre: Jazz, blues
- Country of origin: U.S.
- Location: Chicago, Illinois

Argo Records was a record label in Chicago that was established in 1955 as a division of Chess Records.

Originally the label was called Marterry, but bandleader Ralph Marterie objected, and within a couple of months the imprint was renamed Argo.

Although Chess was a blues label, the Argo division began to record jazz in 1955 and over decades attracted some big names: Gene Ammons, Kenny Burrell, Barry Harris, Illinois Jacquet, Ahmad Jamal, Ramsey Lewis, James Moody, Max Roach, Red Rodney, and Ira Sullivan.

Argo also recorded pop, blues, and calypso. Its first big hit was by Clarence "Frogman" Henry, whose song "Ain't Got No Home" came out in 1956. By 1960, rhythm and blues performers on the label included Etta James and the Dells.

Argo changed its name in 1965 to Cadet Records when the company discovered that an Argo Records already existed in the UK. As with its parent label and British Argo, the catalog is owned by Universal Music Group. Argo was one of several record labels to lose master recordings in the 2008 Universal fire.

== Discography ==
=== Jazz Series (1956–1965) ===
Catalog number	Title	Artist
LP-601	Melodies by Al Hibbler	Al Hibbler
LP-602	Chamber Music of the New Jazz	Ahmad Jamal
LP-603	Flute 'n the Blues	James Moody
LP-604	Lonely One	Pinky Winters
LP-605	Without Sauce	Dick Lane's Quartet
LP-606	Doorway to Dixie	Cy Touff, Miff Mole and Mike Simpson
LP-607	Norman Simmons Trio	Norman Simmons
LP-608	Zoot	Zoot Sims Quartet
LP-609	Chicago Scene	Ira Schulman, Sandy Moose and Eddie Baker
LP-610	Count 'Em 88	Ahmad Jamal
LP-611	Ramsey Lewis and his Gentle-men of Swing	Ramsey Lewis
LP-612	Young John Young	John Young Trio
LP-613	Moody's Mood for Love	James Moody
LP-614	Chubby's Back	Chubby Jackson
LP-615	Dick Lane Quartet	Dick Lane Quartet
LP-616	Chet Chats	Chet Roble
LP-617	Time on My Hands	Seymour and His Heartbeat Trumpet
LP-618	Many Moods	Al Russ Orchestra
LP-619	My Memories	Melavano and Orchestra
LP-620	Out on a Limb with Clark Terry	Clark Terry
LP-621	MJT+3	MJT+3
LP-622	Jazz Exponents	Jazz Exponents
LP-623	MAX	Max Roach Quintet
LP-624	Johnny Griffin	Johnny Griffin Quartet
LP-625	I'm Entitled to You!!	Chubby Jackson
LP-626	Cookin'	Paul Gonsalves
LP-627	Ramsey Lewis and his Gentle-men of Jazz	Ramsey Lewis
LP-628	At the Pershing: But Not for Me	Ahmad Jamal Trio
LP-629	Sonny Stitt	Sonny Stitt
LP-630	The Colorful Strings of Jimmy Woode	Jimmy Woode
LP-631	Swinging the Loop	Vito Price
LP-632	Theme for the Tall One	Bess Bonnier Trio
LP-633	This Is Me, J. C. Heard	J. C. Heard and Orchestra
LP-634	Lateef at Cranbrook	Yusef Lateef
LP-635	2:38 A.M.	Ralph Sharon Quartet and Friend
LP-636	Ahmad Jamal Trio Volume IV	Ahmad Jamal Trio
LP-637	Last Train from Overbrook	James Moody
LP-638	Portfolio of Ahmad Jamal	Ahmad Jamal Trio
LP-639	Relaxin' with Sandy Mosse	Sandy Mosse
LP-640	Marian McPartland at the London House	Marian McPartland
LP-641	Touff Assignment	Cy Touff
LP-642	Lem Winchester and the Ramsey Lewis Trio	Lem Winchester and Ramsey Lewis
LP-643	Red Rodney Returns	Red Rodney
LP-644	Breakin' It Up	Barry Harris Trio
LP-645	An Hour with the Ramsey Lewis Trio	Ramsey Lewis Trio
LP-646	Jamal at the Penthouse	Ahmad Jamal
LP-647	[Unissued]	Will Green
LP-648	James Moody	James Moody
LP-649	Remember the Oldies	Various Artists
LP-650	Taylor Made Jazz	Billy Taylor
LP-651	Holiday on the Riviera	Caesar Giovannini
LP-652	Where There's Fire... There's Smokey Stover and his Original Firemen	Smokey Stover's Original Firemen
LP-653	The Last of the Big Plungers	Al Grey and The Basie Wing
LP-654	Blue Lou	Lou McGarity Big Eight
LP-655	A Night at the Vanguard	Kenny Burrell Trio
LP-656	Fanfare of Hits	Various Artists
LP-657	Jazz	Herb Pilhofer Trio
LP-658	Richard's Alamac	Richard Evans Trio
LP-659	The Legend of Bix	Metropolitan Jazz Octet
LP-660	Mighty High	Milt Buckner
LP-661	Burnin'	Sonny Stitt
LP-662	Happy Moods	Ahmad Jamal Trio
LP-663	Early in the Morning	Lorez Alexandria with the Ramsey Lewis Trio
LP-664	Meet the Jazztet	Art Farmer and Benny Golson
LP-665	Stretching Out	Ramsey Lewis Trio
LP-666	Hey! It's James Moody	James Moody
LP-667	Ahmad Jamal At The Pershing, Volume 2	Ahmad Jamal
LP-668	The Music of Quincy Jones	Benny Bailey, Joe Harris, Åke Persson and the Quincetet
LP-669	Introducing Roland Kirk	Roland Kirk and Ira Sullivan
LP-670	Please Mr. Organ Player	Milt Buckner
LP-671	The Ramsey Lewis Trio in Chicago	Ramsey Lewis Trio
LP-672	Big City Sounds	Art Farmer and Benny Golson
LP-673	Listen to the Ahmad Jamal Quintet	Ahmad Jamal
LP-674	Jubilee	Smokey Stover's Original Firemen
LP-675	Home Cookin'	Richard Evans Trio
LP-676	Playtime	Buddy Rich and His Buddies
LP-677	The Thinking Man's Trombone	Al Grey
LP-678	Art	Art Farmer
LP-679	Moody with Strings	James Moody
LP-680	More Music from the Soil	Ramsey Lewis Trio
LP-681	Take a Number from 1 to 10	Benny Golson
LP-682	Sing No Sad Songs for Me	Lorez Alexandria
LP-683	Sonny Stitt at the D. J. Lounge	Sonny Stitt
LP-684	The Jazztet and John Lewis	John Lewis, Art Farmer and Benny Golson
LP-685	Ahmad Jamal's Alhambra	Ahmad Jamal
LP-686	Never on Sunday	Ramsey Lewis Trio
LP-687	Sound of Christmas	Ramsey Lewis Trio
LP-688	The Jazztet at Birdhouse	Art Farmer and Benny Golson
LP-689	The Al Grey - Billy Mitchell Sextet	Al Grey and Billy Mitchell
LP-690	Dorothy Ashby	Dorothy Ashby
LP-691	All of You	Ahmad Jamal
LP-692	Themes and Things	John Young Trio
LP-693	The Sound of Spring	Ramsey Lewis Trio
LP-694	Deep Roots	Lorez Alexandria
LP-695	Another Bag	James Moody
LP-696	Look Out! Look Out!	Red Holt
LP-697	Dig Him!	Gene Ammons and Sonny Stitt
LP-698	Just Jug	Gene Ammons
LP-699	Just for Kicks	Eldee Young and Company
LP-700	Snap Your Fingers	Al Grey and Billy Mitchell
LP-701	Country Meets the Blues	Ramsey Lewis Trio
LP-702	Midnight Mood	Milt Buckner
LP-703	Ahmad Jamal at the Blackhawk	Ahmad Jamal Trio
LP-704	Soul Cookin'	Thornel Schwartz and Bill Leslie
LP-705	Bossa Nova	Ramsey Lewis Trio
LP-706	Blues on the Other Side	Mike Mainieri Quartet
LP-707	Breakthrough	Gene Shaw Quintet
LP-708	Trumpet Caliente	Don Goldie
LP-709	Rearin' Back	Sonny Stitt
LP-710	Diggin' the Chicks	Bill Leslie
LP-711	Night Song	Al Grey and Billy Mitchell
LP-712	Macanudo	Ahmad Jamal
LP-713	A Touch of Pepper	John Young
LP-714	Soul Merchant	Sam Lazar
LP-715	Pot Luck	Ramsey Lewis Trio
LP-716	Free	Benny Golson Quartet
LP-717	Basie Is Our Boss	Frank Foster
LP-718	Having a Ball	Al Grey
LP-719	Poinciana	Ahmad Jamal
LP-720	For Swingers Only	Lorez Alexandria
LP-721	French Cookin'	Budd Johnson
LP-722	The Message	Illinois Jacquet with Kenny Burrell
LP-723	Barefoot Sunday Blues	Ramsey Lewis Trio
LP-724	Signifyin'	Lou Donaldson
LP-725	Great Day	James Moody
LP-726	Debut in Blues	Gene Shaw
LP-727	Ready and Willing	Herman Foster
LP-728	Here's Love	Hank Jones
LP-729	World of Travel	Jimmy Grissom
LP-730	Move on Over	Sonny Stitt
LP-731	Boss Bone	Al Grey
LP-732	Bach to the Blues	Ramsey Lewis Trio
LP-733	Naked City Theme	Ahmad Jamal
LP-734	Possum Head	Lou Donaldson
LP-735	Desert Winds	Illinois Jacquet
LP-736	Ya! Ya!	Budd Johnson
LP-737	Fantabulous	Oliver Nelson and his Orchestra
LP-738	Perception	Art Farmer
LP-739	Mo' Rock	Baby Face Willette
LP-740	Comin' on Strong	James Moody
LP-741	The Ramsey Lewis Trio at the Bohemian Caverns	Ramsey Lewis Trio
LP-742	Summer Dawn	Sahib Shihab
LP-743	Carnival Sketches	Gene Shaw
LP-744	My Main Man	Sonny Stitt with Bennie Green
LP-745	More Sounds of Christmas	Ramsey Lewis Trio
LP-746	Bosses of the Ballad	Illinois Jacquet
LP-747	Cole Slaw	Lou Donaldson
LP-748	Off the Wall	Budd Johnson
LP-749	Behind the 8 Ball	Baby Face Willette
LP-750	You Better Believe Me	Ramsey Lewis Trio with Jean DuShon
LP-751	The Roar of the Greasepaint	Ahmad Jamal
LP-752	Cool	Rune Ofwerman's Piano
LP-753	Testifyin' Time	Bunky Green
LP-754	Spectrum	Illinois Jacquet
LP-755	Choice! The Best of the Ramsey Lewis Trio	Ramsey Lewis Trio
LP-756	Cookin' the Blues	James Moody
LP-757	The In Crowd	Ramsey Lewis Trio
LP-758	Extensions	Ahmad Jamal
LP-759	Musty Rusty	Lou Donaldson
LP-1078	At the Spotlite Club Vol. 1	Ahmad Jamal Trio

=== Pop/Blues/Folk Series (1961–1965) ===
Catalog number	Title	Artist
LP-4000	The Eyes of Love	Osborne Smith
LP-4001	Johnny Hamlin Quintet	Johnny Hamlin Quintet featuring Marci Miller
LP-4002	Space Flight	Sam Lazar
LP-4003	At Last!	Etta James
LP-4004	Misty Night	King Fleming Trio
LP-4005	The Three Souls	The Three Souls
LP-4006	Morris Grants Presents JUNK	Various Artists
LP-4007	Drum Sum	Buck Clarke Quintet
LP-4008	Drums, Drollery And Drivel	Professor Paradiddle
LP-4009	You Always Hurt the One You Love	Clarence Henry
LP-4010	Brilliant! The Trumpet of Don Goldie	Don Goldie
LP-4011	The Second Time Around	Etta James
LP-4012	Dodo's Back!	Dodo Marmarosa
LP-4013	Etta James	Etta James
LP-4014	[Unissued]	
LP-4015	Playback	Sam Lazar
LP-4016	For the First Time	Shelley Moore
LP-4017	Brown Gal	Bonnie Graham
LP-4018	Etta James Sings for Lovers	Etta James
LP-4019	Stand By!	King Fleming Trio
LP-4020	House Warmin'!	Howard McGhee and the Blazers
LP-4021	The Buck Clarke Sound	Buck Clarke
LP-4022	Let Me In/Music, Music, Music	The Sensations
LP-4023	The Campus Singers at the Fickle Pickle	The Campus Singers
LP-4024	I'm on My Way	Willie Wright
LP-4025	Etta James Top Ten	Etta James
LP-4026	The Blues, Volume 1	Various Artists
LP-4027	The Blues, Volume 2	Various Artists
LP-4028	Cheer Up Me Lads	The Outsiders
LP-4029	Martin Yarbrough Showcase	Martin Yarbrough
LP-4030	Folk Swinger	Dean DeWolf
LP-4031	Folk Festival of the Blues	Various Artists
LP-4032	Etta James Rocks the House	Etta James
LP-4033	Road of Blue	The Campus Singers
LP-4034	The Blues, Volume 3	Various Artists
LP-4035	High Tide: The Folk Songs of Dean DeWolf	Dean DeWolf
LP-4036	Dangerous Dan Express	The Three Souls
LP-4037	The Soul of Blues Harmonica	Shakey Horton
LP-4038	Composer's Choice	Johnny Nash
LP-4039	Make Way for Jean DuShon	Jean DuShon
LP-4040	The Queen of Soul	Etta James
LP-4041	Dick Williams Kids Sing for Big People (and Little People Too)	Dick Williams
LP-4042	The Blues, Volume 4	Various Artists
LP-4043	Mixed Moods	Martin Yarbrough
LP-4044	Soul Sounds	The Three Souls
LP-4045	The Real George Kirby	George Kirby
LP-4047	Jammin' with the Windjammers	The Windjammers

== See also ==
- List of record labels
