= Eden Atwood =

American jazz singer and actress

- Born: January 11, 1969 (age 57); Memphis, Tennessee, U.S.
- Genre: Jazz
- Occupations: Singer, musician, actress
- Instruments: Vocals, piano
- Years active: 1992–present
- Labels: Concord Jazz, Groove Note

Eden Atwood is an American jazz singer and actress. She is the daughter of composer Hubbard Atwood and the granddaughter of the novelist A. B. Guthrie Jr.

== Career ==
Atwood was born in Memphis, Tennessee. When she was five, her parents got a divorce, and she moved with her mother to Montana. Her mother's father was novelist A. B. Guthrie Jr. Her father, Hubbard Atwood, was a composer and arranger who wrote the songs "Tell Me About Yourself" for Nat King Cole, "I Was the Last One to Know" for Stan Kenton, and "No One Ever Tells You" for Frank Sinatra. She took piano lessons, and she sang in a rock band in high school but quit due to damage to her vocal cords. She went to the University of Montana, where she concentrated on musical theater and drama. For six months, she attended the American Conservatory of Music in Chicago. She gave a demo tape to a bar owner in Chicago, and after hearing her he made her the headliner.

In 1992, Atwood had recurring roles on the soap opera Loving and the crime drama The Commish. At the same time, she began singing in clubs in New York City. Marian McPartland, a pianist and radio host, heard a copy of Atwood's debut album, Today! (1992), which was independently produced during the previous year. McPartland sent a copy to Concord Records, which then made Atwood one of the youngest musicians to sign a contract with Concord. The debut album was reissued under the name No One Ever Tells You.

As of 2022 she is a psychotherapist who conducts psychodynamic/relational therapy, cognitive behavioral therapy, motivational interviewing and narrative therapy.

== AIS ==
Atwood was born with complete androgen insensitivity syndrome (CAIS), an intersex trait occurring in approximately 1 in 20,000 people. In a person with CAIS, the body's cells are unable to respond to androgens. When Atwood was fourteen years old, her mother and her doctors lied about her condition and falsely informed that she had pre-cancerous twisted ovaries after she was diagnosed CAIS. To further compound this deception, Atwood underwent surgery to remove her internal testes. She discussed AIS for the first time publicly with Bill Kohlhaase in the liner notes for her 2002 album, Waves: The Bossa Nova Session. In 2008, she was featured on ABC's Primetime Live.

Atwood is a co-founder of The Interface Project, a project that shares stories of people born with intersex conditions.

== Discography ==
- Today! (Southport, 1992)
- No One Ever Tells You (Concord Jazz, 1993)
- Cat on a Hot Tin Roof (Concord Jazz, 1994)
- There Again (Concord Jazz, 1995)
- A Night in the Life (Concord Jazz, 1996)
- My Ideal (Sangaji Music, 2000)
- Waves: The Bossa Nova Session (Groove Note, 2002)
- Wild Women Don't Get the Blues (Eden Atwood & Last Best Band, 2002)
- Feels Like Home (Eden Atwood & Last Best Band, 2003)
- This Is Always: The Ballad Session (Groove Note, 2004)
- Turn Me Loose (SSJ, 2009)
- Like Someone in Love (SSJ, 2010)
- Angel Eyes (SSJ, 2012)

== Filmography ==
Television
Year	Title	Role	Notes
1991-1992	The Commish	Gloria	3 episodes
1992	Loving	Staige Prince	59 episodes
1994	The Good Life	Miss Cole	Episode: "Bob's Field Trip"
