= Clarence Johnston (jazz drummer) =

American jazz drummer (1925–2019)

- Born: October 24, 1925; Boston, Massachusetts, U.S.
- Died: May 17, 2019 (aged 93); Burbank, California, U.S.
- Genres: Jazz
- Occupation: Musician
- Instrument: Drums
- Years active: 1950s–1970s

Clarendon Carlisle Johnston (October 24, 1925 – May 17, 2019), commonly known as Clarence Johnston (sometimes misspelled as Johnson), was an American jazz drummer.

== Life and career ==
Johnston was born in Boston, Massachusetts on October 24, 1925.

He appeared on several mid-1950s recordings by James Moody and early 1960s albums by vocalist Joe Williams, by sax player Jimmy Forrest, and by organist Freddie Roach, including the latter's debut on the Blue Note label, Down to Earth (1962). In the second half of the 1970s, he appeared on three Sonny Stitt albums.

Johnston moved to Los Angeles in 1971 and became a drum mentor at Grant's Music School. He died in Burbank, California on May 17, 2019, at the age of 94.

== Discography ==
=== With James Moody ===
Release year	Album	Label	Personnel
1954 (recorded September)	Moody	Prestige	James Moody and his band
1954 (recorded September)	James Moody's Moods	Prestige	James Moody, Dave Burns, William Shepherd, Pee Wee Moore, Jimmy Boyd, John Lathan, Clarence Johnston
1955	Hi Fi Party	Prestige	James Moody, Dave Burns, William Shepherd, Pee Wee Moore, Jimmy Boyd, John Lathan, Eddie Jefferson
1955	Wail, Moody, Wail	Prestige	James Moody, Dave Burns, William Shepherd, Pee Wee Moore, Jimmy Boyd, John Lathan
1956	Flute 'n the Blues	Argo	James Moody, Johnny Coles, William Shepherd, Pee Wee Moore, Jimmy Boyd, John Lathan
1959 (recorded August)	James Moody	Argo	James Moody, Johnny Coles, Tom McIntosh, Musa Kaleem, Gene Kee, John Lathan
1959 (recorded December)	Hey! It's James Moody	Argo	James Moody, Johnny Gray, Eldee Young, Eddie Jefferson

=== With Jimmy Forrest ===
Release year	Album	Label	Personnel
1961 (recorded April)	Out of the Forrest	Prestige	Jimmy Forrest, Joe Zawinul, Tommy Potter
1961 (recorded September)	Sit Down and Relax with Jimmy Forrest	Prestige	Jimmy Forrest, Hugh Lawson, Calvin Newborn, Tommy Potter
1961 (recorded October)	Most Much!	Prestige	Jimmy Forrest, Hugh Lawson, Tommy Potter, Ray Barretto

=== With Freddie Roach ===
Release year	Album	Label	Personnel
1962	Down to Earth	Blue Note	Freddie Roach, Percy France, Kenny Burrell
1963	Mo' Greens Please	Blue Note	Freddie Roach, Kenny Burrell, Conrad Lester
1964	Good Move!	Blue Note	Freddie Roach, Eddie Wright, Blue Mitchell, Hank Mobley
1964	Brown Sugar	Blue Note	Freddie Roach, Eddie Wright, Joe Henderson
1965	All That's Good	Blue Note	Freddie Roach, Conrad Lester, Calvin Newborn, Marvin Robinson, Phyllis Smith, Willie Tate

=== With Sonny Stitt ===
Release year	Album	Label	Personnel
1976	Forecast: Sonny & Red	Catalyst	Sonny Stitt, Red Holloway, Art Hillery, Larry Gales
1976	I Remember Bird	Catalyst	Sonny Stitt, Frank Rosolino, Dolo Coker, Allen Jackson
1977	Sonny Stitt with Strings: A Tribute to Duke Ellington	Catalyst	Sonny Stitt, Gildo Mahones, Allen Jackson, string section arranged and conducted by Bill Finegan

=== With others ===
Release year	Album	Label	Personnel
1961	Together	Roulette	Joe Williams, Harry Edison, Jimmy Forrest, Charles Thompson, Tommy Potter
1962	Jawbreakers	Riverside	Eddie "Lockjaw" Davis, Harry Edison, Hugh Lawson, Ike Isaacs
1962	Wanted to Do One Together (also released as Ben and "Sweets" )	Columbia	Ben Webster, Harry Edison, Hank Jones, George Duvivier
1963	Never Let Me Go	Blue Note	Stanley Turrentine, Shirley Scott, Sam Jones
1967	Extension	Blue Note	George Braith, Billy Gardner, Grant Green
1979	A Woman Knows	Discovery	Lorez Alexandria, Jack Wilson, Charles Owens, Brian Atkinson, Rick Zurtigar, Allen Jackson
