= Moody's Mood for Love =

1952 jazz song

Song by James Moody
- Composers: Jimmy McHugh, James Moody
- Lyricists: Dorothy Fields, Eddie Jefferson

"Moody's Mood for Love" (a.k.a. Moody's Mood) is a 1952 song by Eddie Jefferson, whose melody is derived from an improvised solo by jazz saxophonist James Moody (and a brief solo in the middle by pianist Thore Swanerud) on a 1949 recording of the 1935 song "I'm in the Mood for Love". The song is structured as a duet, with a man proclaiming his love for a woman, and the woman (in the part of the melody corresponding to the piano solo) responding in kind.

The song gained widespread popularity after being recorded by singer King Pleasure, with the woman's part sung by Blossom Dearie. The song helped to popularize the vocalese jazz singing style. It has since been covered by many artists. Moody himself adopted the song as his own, recording it with Jefferson on the 1956 album Moody's Mood for Love and often singing the song himself in concert.

== History ==
James Moody created his improvised solo in 1949 on a visit to Sweden. Moody's playing clearly shows the influence of Charlie Parker. The recording includes, in the middle, an eight-bar improvisation by Swedish pianist Thore Swanerud, who was part of the backing band. Moody, who normally played the tenor saxophone, used a borrowed alto saxophone for the recording. He later admitted that he played an excess number of notes, not because he was improvising, but because he was trying to find the correct keys on the unfamiliar instrument.

At some point in the next few years, jazz singer Eddie Jefferson wrote lyrics to this improvised melody, a practice known as vocalese, and added the song to his repertoire. Jefferson's lyrics include the piano solo, which is sung from the point of view of a woman ("What is all this talk about loving me, my sweet?"). It also references Moody himself at the end of the song ("James Moody, you can come on in man and you can blow now if you want to, I'm through"). King Pleasure heard Jefferson perform it in a jazz club and asked permission to perform it. In November 1951, Pleasure sang his version at the Apollo Theater Amateur Hour, winning first prize along with a contract to record the tune for Prestige. Pleasure's recording, released in 1952, gave the song its now-common title of "Moody's Mood for Love". It included Blossom Dearie singing the female part, and a band headed by Teacho Wiltshire. The recording, King Pleasure's first, was a hit for the Prestige label.

Following King Pleasure's successful recording, Jimmy McHugh, who wrote the music for "I'm in the Mood for Love", sued for copyright infringement and won a partial victory in court. He and Moody eventually agreed to share the proceeds on sales of any versions of the tune.

Moody embraced the song, and later hired Jefferson to come on the road with him. Jefferson also appeared on a number of Moody's subsequent albums: Moody (1954), James Moody's Moods, Hi Fi Party, Flute 'n the Blues (all 1956), Moody's Mood for Love (1957), Hey! It's James Moody (1959), and Cookin' the Blues (1964).

== Influence ==
Although "Moody's Mood for Love" was not the first vocalese song, it helped bring that music form to a much wider audience. Most notably, it helped start the career of vocalese pioneer Jon Hendricks. Hendricks was sitting in a café when the King Pleasure recording of "Moody's Mood" came on the jukebox. According to Hendricks, he had been writing "unpopular" songs for some time, but when he heard the recording and realized that it was a saxophone solo with words he decided to change his approach to songwriting. "I didn't have to stop at 32 bars. Now I could write lyrics for all the parts in the orchestra." He went on to collaborate with the singer and arranger Dave Lambert and the singer Annie Ross to form the vocalese group Lambert, Hendricks & Ross.

In the 1970s, New York City urban contemporary radio DJ Frankie Crocker played the King Pleasure recording of the song every night at the end of his show on WBLS-FM.

== Notable recordings ==
- 1952 by King Pleasure (featuring Blossom Dearie)
- 1956 by James Moody (featuring Eddie Jefferson) on the album Moody's Mood for Love
- 1964 by Georgie Fame (as Moody's Mood For Love)
- 1973 by Aretha Franklin on the album Hey Now Hey (The Other Side Of The Sky)
- 1975 by George Benson on the album Pacific Fire
- 1977 by Eddie Jefferson (featuring Janet Lawson) on the album The Main Man (Inner City)
- 1980 by George Benson (featuring Patti Austin) on the album Give Me the Night
- 1993 by Van Morrison (featuring Teena Lyle) on the album Too Long in Exile
- 1995 by Quincy Jones (featuring Brian McKnight, Rachelle Ferrell, Take 6 and James Moody) on the album Q's Jook Joint
- 2003 by Amy Winehouse on the album Frank
- 2017 by Patti LaBelle (featuring Kem) on the album Bel Hommage
