= New Sounds =

New Sounds 10" LP

Compilation album by Max Roach, James Moody, Kenny Dorham and Art Blakey
- Released: August 1952
- Recorded: December 22, 1947; April 30 and May 15, 1949
- Genre: Jazz
- Length: 24:30
- Label: Blue Note
- Producer: Alfred Lion

Art Blakey chronology
| New Sounds; 10" LP (1952) | A Night at Birdland Vol. 1 (1954) |

Max Roach chronology
| New Sounds (1952) | The Max Roach Quartet featuring Hank Mobley (1953) |

New Sounds Compact Disc

Compilation album by Art Blakey's Messengers, James Moody and his Modernists
- Released: 1991
- Recorded: December 22, 1947; October 19 and 25, 1948
- Genre: Jazz
- Length: 41:27
- Label: Blue Note
- Producer: Alfred Lion, Michael Cuscuna

James Moody and his Modernists
- Original 10" LP

James Moody chronology
| James Moody and his Modernists (1952) | New Sounds (1952) | Moody (1954) |

New Sounds was originally a 10-inch LP compiling previously released 78 rpm records on the Blue Note label. A CD reissue with the same name and cover appeared in 1991, but while using many of the same personnel, had only two tracks in common with the original LP. It instead compiled a distinct James Moody 10-inch LP (James Moody and his Modernists, BLP 5006) with the Art Blakey tracks and included several tracks previously unreleased on LP or any format. Conversely, the tracks omitted from the CD, which were on the Moody LP, have not been reissued on CD.

== Background ==
In December 1947, Art Blakey formed a group for his first sessions as a leader. Dubbed Art Blakey's Messengers, this group was a precursor to The Jazz Messengers groups of the next decade and beyond. Blakey had recently gone on a pilgrimage to Africa and adopted Islam. Many of his fellow musicians had adopted the religion as well, and the "Messengers" name was a nod to the message of the religion. Five tracks were recorded during this session, four of which came out on 78s. Two of the tracks were on the original 10-inch LP, all five are on the CD.

Three of the other four tracks on the original 10-inch LP were recorded by a group billed as the Max Roach Quintet, recorded in Paris in May 1949. This group included James Moody and Kenny Dorham (who was also in Blakey's Messengers). The final track was recorded by a Moody-led group in Switzerland, in April 1949. These four tracks were originally released on three 78s.

As noted above the previous four tracks were omitted from the CD and replaced by two different James Moody sessions which were previously released on the 10-inch LP James Moody and His Modernists (BLP 5006). This LP, too, was a compilation of records originally released as 78s. The New Sounds CD includes the entirety of these two sessions—recorded October 19 and 25, 1948—including a previously unreleased alternate take of "The Fuller Bop Man."

== Reception ==
In his review of the CD version of New Sounds, Scott Yanow of AllMusic described the recordings as "historically significant. Classic and formerly rare music."

== Track listing ==
=== Original LP ===
Side A
| No. | Title | Writer(s) | Length |
|---|---|---|---|
| 1. | "Prince Albert" ( (Note: originally released on Blue Note 78rpm BN 1569)) | Kenny Dorham, Max Roach | 5:53 |
| 2. | "Maximum" ( (Note: originally released on Blue Note 78rpm BN 1570)) | Kenny Dorham, Max Roach | 3:25 |
| 3. | "The Thin Man" ( (Note: originally released on Blue Note 78rpm BN 545)) | Kenny Dorham | 2:58 |

Side B
| No. | Title | Writer(s) | Length |
|---|---|---|---|
| 1. | "Tomorrow" ( (Note: originally released on Blue Note 78rpm BN 1571)) | Kenny Dorham, Max Roach | 6:08 |
| 2. | "Just Moody" | James Moody | 2:58 |
| 3. | "Bop Alley" ( (Note: originally released on Blue Note 78rpm BN 546)) | Talib Dawud | 3:08 |

=== Compact disc ===
| No. | Title | Writer(s) | Length |
|---|---|---|---|
| 1. | "The Fuller Bop Man [alternate take]" (previously unreleased) | Gil Fuller | 2:54 |
| 2. | "The Fuller Bop Man" (previously released on James Moody and his Modernists [BLP 5006] (Note: originally released on Blue Note 78rpm BN553)) | Gil Fuller | 2:56 |
| 3. | "Workshop" (previously released on James Moody and his Modernists [BLP 5006] (Note: originally released on Blue Note 78rpm BN556)) | Gil Fuller | 3:15 |
| 4. | "Oh Henry" (previously released on James Moody and his Modernists [BLP 5006] (Note: originally released on Blue Note 78rpm BN555)) | Gil Fuller, Ernie Henry | 2:30 |
| 5. | "Moodamorphosis" (previously released on James Moody and his Modernists [BLP 5006] (Note: originally released on Blue Note 78rpm BN554)) | Gil Fuller, Dave Burns | 3:00 |
| 6. | "Moody's All Frantic" (previously released on James Moody and his Modernists [BLP 5006]) | James Moody, Gil Fuller | 2:32 |
| 7. | "Tropicana" (previously released on James Moody and his Modernists [BLP 5006]) | Gil Fuller | 3:00 |
| 8. | "Cu-Ba" (previously released on James Moody and his Modernists [BLP 5006]) | Cecil Payne | 2;34 |
| 9. | "Tin Tin Deo" (previously released on James Moody and his Modernists [BLP 5006]) | Chano Pozo, Gil Fuller | 2:44 |
| 10. | "The Thin Man" | Kenny Dorham | 2:58 |
| 11. | "Bop Alley" | Talib Dawud | 3:08 |
| 12. | "Bop Alley [alternate take]" (previously unreleased) | Talib Dawud | 3:06 |
| 13. | "Groove Street" | Musa Kaleem | 2:15 |
| 14. | "Musa's Vision" | Musa Kaleem | 3:05 |

== Personnel ==
=== Art Blakey's Messengers ===
LP Tracks A3 and B3, CD tracks 10–14

- Kenny Dorham – trumpet
- Haleen Rashid (Note: Billed under his original name – "Howard Bowe" – on the LP and CD) – trombone
- Sahib Shihab – alto saxophone
- Musa Kaleem (Note: Billed under his original name – "Orlando Wright" – on the LP) – tenor saxophone
- Ernest Thompson – baritone saxophone
- Walter Bishop, Jr. – piano
- Laverne Barker – double bass
- Art Blakey – drums

=== Max Roach Quintet ===
LP tracks A1, A2, B1

- Kenny Dorham – trumpet
- James Moody – tenor saxophone
- Al Haig – piano
- Tommy Potter – double bass
- Max Roach – drums

=== James Moody Quartet ===
LP track B2

- James Moody – tenor saxophone
- Art Simmons – piano
- Alvin "Buddy" Banks – double bass
- Clarence Terry – drums

=== James Moody's Modernists ===
CD tracks 1–9

- Dave Burns, Elmon Wright – trumpet
- Ernie Henry – alto saxophone
- James Moody – tenor saxophone
- Cecil Payne – baritone saxophone
- James "Hen Gates" Forman – piano
- Nelson Boyd – double bass
- Teddy Stewart – drums (tracks 1–5)
- Art Blakey – drums (tracks 6–9)
- Chano Pozo – conga, vocals (tracks 6–9)
- Gil Fuller – arranger
