= King Pleasure =

American jazz vocalist (1922–1982)

- Born: Clarence Beeks; March 24, 1922; Oakdale, Tennessee, U.S.
- Origin: New York City, U.S.
- Died: March 21, 1981 (aged 58)
- Genres: Jazz
- Occupation: Vocalist
- Labels: Prestige; Jubilee; Aladdin; United Artists

King Pleasure (born Clarence Beeks; March 24, 1922 – March 21, 1981) was an American jazz vocalist and an early master of vocalese, a style in which lyrics are set to an instrumental composition or solo.

== Biography ==
Born Clarence Beeks, in Oakdale, Tennessee, he moved to New York City in the mid-1940s, working as a bartender, where he became a fan of bebop. King Pleasure first gained attention by singing the Eddie Jefferson vocalese classic "Moody's Mood for Love", based on a 1949 James Moody saxophone solo to "I'm in the Mood for Love". Pleasure's 1952 recording, his first after signing a contract with the Prestige label, is considered a jazz classic; the female vocalist featured is Blossom Dearie. He and Betty Carter also recorded a famous vocalese version of "Red Top", a jazz classic penned by Kansas Citian Ben Kynard and recorded by Gene Ammons and others. Other notable recordings include a presciently elegiac version of "Parker's Mood", the year before Charlie Parker died in 1955, and Pleasure's take on Ammons's "Hittin' the Jug", retitled as "Swan Blues" in 1962.

Pleasure has been cited as a significant influence by Van Morrison, especially on his album Astral Weeks. Genya Ravan, drawing inspiration for her singing from King Pleasure, recorded "Moody's Mood for Love" with James Moody on her 1972 CBS album Genya Ravan.

Pleasure died on March 21, 1981, aged 58.

== Discography ==
=== 10-inch shellac (78 rpm) and 7-inch vinyl (45 rpm) releases ===
Release year	A-side / B-side	Label, catalog no.	Personnel / Notes
1952	"Moody Mood for Love" / "Exclamation Blues"	Prestige 924	Merrill Stepter (trumpet); Lem Davis (alto saxophone); Ray Abrams (tenor saxophone); Cecil Payne (baritone saxophone); Teacho Wiltshire (piano); Leonard Gaskin (bass); Teddy Lee (drums); King Pleasure (vocals); Blossom Dearie (vocals) – NYC, February 19
1952	"Red Top" / "Jumpin' with Symphony Sid"	Prestige 821	Ed Lewis (trumpet); Charlie Ferguson (tenor saxophone); Ed Swanston (piano); Peck Morrison (bass); Herbie Lovelle (drums); King Pleasure (vocals); Betty Carter (vocals) – NYC, December 12
1953	"Sometimes I'm Happy" / "This Is Always"	Prestige 860	John Lewis (piano); Percy Heath (bass); Kenny Clarke (drums); King Pleasure (vocals); Dave Lambert Singers (vocal trio) – NYC, September 29
1953	"Parker's Mood" / "What Can I Say Dear (After I Say I'm Sorry)"	Prestige 880	John Lewis (piano); Percy Heath (bass); Kenny Clarke (drums); King Pleasure (vocals) – NYC, December 24
1954	"I'm Gone" / "You're Crying"	Prestige 908	J. J. Johnson, Kai Winding (trombone); Lucky Thompson (tenor saxophone); Danny Bank (baritone saxophone); Jimmy Jones (piano); Paul Chambers (bass); Joe Harris (drums); King Pleasure (vocals); Jon Hendricks, Eddie Jefferson, The Three Riffs (chorus); Quincy Jones (arranger, director) – Van Gelder Studio, Hackensack, NJ, December 7
1954	"Don't Get Scared" / "Funk Junction"	Prestige 913	J. J. Johnson, Kai Winding (trombone); Lucky Thompson (tenor saxophone); Danny Bank (baritone saxophone); Jimmy Jones (piano); Paul Chambers (bass); Joe Harris (drums); King Pleasure (vocals); Jon Hendricks, Eddie Jefferson, The Three Riffs (chorus); Quincy Jones (arranger, director) – Van Gelder Studio, Hackensack, NJ, December 7
1955	"Diaper Pin" / "Evening Blues"	Jubilee 5226	Unknown personnel
1956	"D. B. Blues" // "Blues I Like to Hear"	Aladdin 3343	Unknown personnel
1956	"At Your Beck and Call" / "I'm in the Mood for Love"	Aladdin 3352	Unknown personnel
1958	"Red Top" / "Don't Get Scared"	Prestige 45-124	Reissues of Prestige 821A and 913A
1960	"Jumpin' with Symphony Sid" / "Parker's Mood"	Prestige 45-182	Reissues of Prestige 821B and 880A
1960	"Golden Days" / "All of Me"	HiFi Jazz 5004	From Golden Days album
1962	"Mean to Me" / "This Is Always"	United Artists 527	From Mr. Jazz album
1963	"Don't Get Scared" / "I'm in the Mood for Love"	United Artists 636	From Mr. Jazz album
1968	"I'm in the Mood for Love" / "Red Top"	Prestige 45-744	Reissues of Prestige 924A and 821A
1972	"That Old Black Magic" / "I'm in the Mood for Love"	United Artists 50940	From Moody's Mood For Love album

=== 7-inch EPs ===
- 1957: King Pleasure Sings (Prestige #PREP-1338) – four tracks recorded 1952–53; includes the singles: Prestige 821A&B and 860A&B

=== 10-inch LPs ===
- 1955: King Pleasure Sings (Prestige #LP-208) – eight tracks recorded 1952–54; includes the singles: Prestige 821A&B, 860A&B, 880A&B, 908A, and 913A

=== 12-inch LPs ===
Release year	A-side / B-side	Label, catalog no.	Personnel / Notes
1957	King Pleasure Sings / Annie Ross Sings	Prestige #PRLP-7128	Reissued in 1986 by Original Jazz Classics (#OJC-217) with four Annie Ross tracks added; these are from Annie Ross Sings, Prestige #PREP-1301). Note: the CD reissue has all twelve King Pleasure recordings plus the four Annie Ross tracks.
1960	Golden Days	HiFi Jazz #J-425	King Pleasure (vocals); Matthew Gee (trombone); Teddy Edwards, Harold Land (tenor saxophone); Gerald Wiggins (piano); Wilfred Middlebrooks (bass); Earl Palmer (drums). Reissued in 1991 by Original Jazz Classics (#OJC-1772)
1962	Mr. Jazz	United Artists #UAJ-14012/UAS-15012	Unknown personnel. Reissued in 1968 by Solid State (#SS-18021)
1968	Original Moody's Mood	Prestige #PR-7586	Compilation with all twelve recordings made for the Prestige label
1972	The Source	Prestige #PR-24017	2-LP set/reissue of Golden Days and Original Moody's Mood albums
1972	Moody's Mood For Love	United Artists #UAS-5634	CD reissue in 1992 by Blue Note (#84463) of material from Mr. Jazz. Note: the CD also includes the two Jubilee and the four Aladdin tracks, plus three previously unreleased recordings as a bonus.
