= Thore Swanerud =

Swedish musician

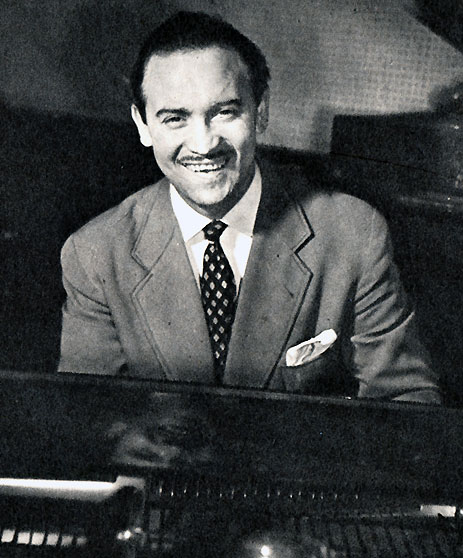
Thorne Swanerud in 1945

Thore Swanerud (18 June 1919 – 8 December 1988) was a Swedish jazz pianist, vibraphonist, arranger, conductor, and composer. He was born in Stockholm and died in the same city.

He is best remembered for an eight-bar improvised solo he made during a 1949 recording of "I'm in the Mood for Love", in a quintet headed by James Moody while Moody was touring Sweden. Eddie Jefferson created the 1952 song "Moody's Mood for Love" in vocalese style by adding lyrics to Moody's and Swanerud's solos in the recording, and the song later became a jazz standard, covered by many singers.

== Career ==
Swanerud played extensively with major Swedish dance bands in the 1940s, such as the groups of Simon Brehm, Miff Görling, and Stan Hasselgård. He led his own six-piece ensemble in 1949-1951 and led smaller groups in the 1950s and 1960s. His associations include work with Ernestine Anderson and James Moody. In addition to recording as a jazz leader, he also did arrangement work and led studio orchestras for Swedish recordings.

== Film score ==
- 1956 – The Hard Game
- 1957 – Sommarnöje sökes
- 1970 – Den magiska cirkeln

== Filmography ==
- 1949 – Kvinnan som försvann
- 1956 – Suss gott
