= Kynard =

Kynard is a surname. Notable people with the surname include:

- Ben Kynard (1920–2012), American jazz saxophonist
- Charles Kynard (1933–1979), American soul jazz/acid jazz organist
- Erik Kynard (born 1991), American track and field athlete
