= Sandy Mosse =

American jazz musician (1929–1983)

Sandy Mosse (May 29, 1929 in Detroit, Michigan – July 1, 1983 in Amsterdam, the Netherlands) was an American jazz tenor saxophonist, influenced by Lester Young.

Mosse learned clarinet and alto saxophone early in life, and switched to tenor sax at the beginning of the 1950s. Based out of Chicago during the decade, he made several forays abroad, playing in Paris with Wallace Bishop in 1951, Django Reinhardt, and Woody Herman on his 1953 tour of Europe. Upon returning to Chicago in 1955 he played with Bill Russo, Chubby Jackson, James Moody, and Cy Touff. Mosse and Touff also co-led an octet called Pieces of Eight late in the 1950s into the early 1960s, featuring trumpeter John Howell. He received awards from Down Beat and Playboy late in the 1950s. In the 1960s he played with Buddy Rich, Maynard Ferguson, and Dave Remington; he also formed a band with Warren Kime, flugel horn, called Pieces of Eight; that same decade he was diagnosed with cancer.

Mosse married a Dutch woman, Clara, and he moved to Amsterdam in the 1970s, playing on national radio and teaching at the Royal Dutch Conservatory. He recorded less, but occasionally toured the U.S. with the likes of Zoot Sims and Al Cohn. In the Netherlands, he played with an ensemble called Volume Two, with Irvin Rochlin, Klaus Flenter, Evert Hekkema, Ben Gerritsen, and Lex Cohen.

== Discography ==
=== As leader ===
- Chicago Scene (Argo, 1957)
- Relaxin' with Sandy Mosse (Argo, 1959)

=== As sideman ===
- Chubby Jackson, Chubby's Back! (Argo, 1957)
- Chubby Jackson, I'm Entitled to You!! (Argo, 1958)
- James Moody, Last Train from Overbrook (Argo, 1958)
- James Moody, Moody's Mood (Chess, 1976)
- Jack Noren, The Exhibit (Replica, 1958)
- Henri Renaud, Modern Sounds: France (Contemporary, 1953)
- Bill Russo, The World of Alcina (LPTime, 2008)
- Cy Touff, Touff Assignment (Argo, 1959)
- Cy Touff, Tickle Toe (Delmark, 2008)
