= James Moody =

James Moody may refer to:

== Law ==
- James S. Moody Jr. (born 1947), American judge
- James Maxwell Moody (born 1940), U.S. federal judge
- James M. Moody Jr. (born 1964), U.S. federal judge, son of James Maxwell Moody
- James Tyne Moody (born 1938), U.S. federal judge

== Music ==
- James Moody (composer) (1907–1995), composer for the harmonica
- James Moody (saxophonist) (1925–2010), jazz saxophone and flute player
  - James Moody (album), 1959

== Politics ==
- James Budd Moody (1790–1828), merchant, shipping agent and political figure in Nova Scotia
- James Moody (loyalist) (died 1809), loyalist volunteer and Nova Scotia politician from New Jersey
- James M. Moody (1858–1901), U.S. representative
- Jim Moody (1935–2019), politician

== Other ==
- James Chin Moody (born 1976), general manager of International Development at CSIRO
- James Leith Moody (1816–1896), British priest
- James Paul Moody (1887–1912), officer on the RMS Titanic
- Jim Moody (actor) (born 1949), television and film character actor
- Jimmy Moody (1941–1993), British gangster

== See also ==
- James Mudie (1779–1852), Australian settler, marine and author
