= Wail, Moody, Wail =

Studio album by James Moody
- Released: 1956
- Recorded: December 12, 1955; Van Gelder Studio, Hackensack, New Jersey
- Genre: Jazz
- Length: 39:21
- Label: Prestige; PRLP 7036
- Producer: Bob Weinstock

James Moody chronology
Hi Fi Party (1955)	Wail, Moody, Wail (1956)	Flute 'n the Blues (1956)

Wail, Moody, Wail is an album by saxophonist James Moody recorded in 1955 and released on the Prestige label. The CD reissue added two bonus tracks which originally appeared on James Moody's Moods.

== Reception ==
Professional ratings
Review scores
Source	Rating
Allmusic	4/5 stars
The Penguin Guide to Jazz Recordings	3.5/4 stars

Scott Yanow, writing for AllMusic, stated: "The bop-based group had plenty of spirit (as best shown here on the 14-minute title cut) if not necessarily a strong personality of its own... accessible, melodic and swinging".

== Track listing ==
1. "The Golden Touch" (Quincy Jones) - 4:09
2. "The Nearness of You" (Hoagy Carmichael, Ned Washington) - 4:53
3. "The Donkey Serenade" (Rudolf Friml, Herbert Stothart) - 3:45
4. "Moody's Blue Again" (Jones) - 4:34
5. "Wail Moody, Wail" (Dave Burns, James Moody) - 13:56
6. "The Strut" (Benny Golson) - 4:02 Bonus track on CD reissue
7. "A Sinner Kissed an Angel" (Mack David, Larry Shayne) - 4:02 Bonus track on CD reissue

== Personnel ==
- James Moody - tenor saxophone, alto saxophone
- Dave Burns - trumpet
- William Shepherd - trombone
- Pee Wee Moore - baritone saxophone
- Jimmy Boyd - piano
- John Latham - bass
- Clarence Johnston - drums

=== Production ===
- Bob Weinstock - supervisor
- Rudy Van Gelder - engineer
