= Another Bag =

Studio album by James Moody
- Released: 1962
- Recorded: January 30, 1962
- Studio: Ter-Mar Recording Studios, Chicago, Illinois
- Genre: Jazz
- Label: Argo; LP 695
- Producer: Max Cooperstein

James Moody chronology
Cookin' the Blues (1961)	Another Bag (1962)	Great Day (1963)

Another Bag is an album by saxophonist James Moody recorded in 1962 and released on the Argo label.

== Reception ==
Professional ratings
Review scores
Source	Rating
Allmusic	4/5 stars
Down Beat	4/5 stars

Jason Ankeny of Allmusic states: "Another Bag vaults tenor saxophonist James Moody even further past his bop roots. Another in a series of collaborations with arranger and composer Tom McIntosh, its rich, deep sound is both fiercely cerebral and nakedly emotional... The music is both angular and accessible, bolstered by a clutch of clever, dynamic McIntosh melodies.

== Track listing ==
All compositions by Tom McIntosh, except as indicated

1. "Sassy Lady" - 4:33
2. "Ally (Parts 1, 2, 3)" - 7:25
3. "Spastic" (Ken Duhon) - 2:55
4. "Minuet in G" - 3:00
5. "Cup Bearers" - 6:36
6. "The Day After" - 5:12
7. "Pleyel D'Jaime" (Dennis Sandole) - 2:40

== Personnel ==
- James Moody - tenor saxophone, flute
- Paul Serrano - trumpet
- John Avant - trombone
- Kenny Barron - piano
- Ernest Outlaw - bass
- Marshall Thompson - drums
- Tom McIntosh - arranger
