= The Freddie Roach Soul Book =

Studio album by Freddie Roach
- Released: Late October 1966
- Recorded: June 13 & 28, 1966
- Studio: Van Gelder Studio, Englewood Cliffs, NJ
- Genre: Soul jazz
- Length: 35:39
- Label: Prestige (US); Transatlantic (UK)
- Producer: Ozzie Cadena

Freddie Roach chronology
All That's Good (1964)	The Freddie Roach Soul Book (1966)	Mocha Motion! (1967)

The Freddie Roach Soul Book (also referred to as simply The Soul Book) is an album by American organist Freddie Roach released on Prestige in late 1966. It was his first album for Prestige after a two-year stint with Blue Note.

Professional ratings
Review scores
Source	Rating
Allmusic	3/5 stars

== Track listing ==
All tracks by Roach, unless otherwise noted.

1. "Spacious" - 8:38
2. "Avatara" - 3:38
3. "Tenderly" (Gross, Lawrence) - 6:19
4. "One Track Mind" - 5:48
5. "You've Got Your Troubles" (Cook, Greenaway) - 4:36
6. "The Bees" - 6:40

Recorded on June 13 (#5) and June 28 (all others), 1966.

== Personnel ==
Tracks 1–4, 6

- Freddie Roach - organ
- Buddy Terry - tenor saxophone
- Vinnie Corrao - guitar
- Jackie Mills - drums

Track 5

- Freddie Roach - organ
- Skeeter Best - guitar
- Ray Lucas - drums
- King Errisson - congas
