= Great Day (album) =

Studio album by James Moody
- Released: 1963
- Recorded: June 17 & 18, 1963; New York City
- Genre: Jazz
- Label: Argo; LP 725
- Producer: Esmond Edwards

James Moody chronology
Another Bag (1962)	Great Day (1963)	Comin' On Strong (1963)

Great Day (also released as The Great Day) is an album by saxophonist James Moody recorded in 1963 and released on the Argo label. It was supervised by Esmond Edwards who also did the cover painting.

== Reception ==
Professional ratings
Review scores
Source	Rating
Allmusic	4.5/5 stars

Ron Wynn of Allmusic states: "Some good, sometimes excellent sax and flute work from the always reliable James Moody. This was a period in which he was dabbling sometimes in soul jazz and other times in hard bop, but mostly played mainstream, straight-ahead originals, standards, and ballads".

== Track listing ==
All compositions by Tom McIntosh, except as indicated

1. "Great Day" - 4:00
2. "The Search" - 4:35
3. "Let's Try" - 3:22
4. "One Never Knows" (John Lewis) - 5:18
5. "Opales'que" (Dennis Sandole) - 5:01
6. "Blues Impromptu" (James Moody) - 5:30
7. "Malice Toward None" - 5:20

== Personnel ==
- James Moody - alto saxophone, tenor saxophone, flute
- Johnny Coles, Thad Jones- trumpet
- Hubert Laws - flute
- Hank Jones, Bernie Leighton - piano
- Jim Hall - guitar
- Richard Davis - bass
- Mel Lewis - drums
- Tom McIntosh - arranger, conductor
