= I Remember Bird =

1977 album by Sonny Stitt

Studio album by Sonny Stitt
- Released: 1977
- Recorded: 1976
- Studio: Sage & Sound Studios, Hollywood, CA
- Genre: Jazz
- Label: Catalyst; CAT-7608
- Producer: Pat Britt

Sonny Stitt chronology
| Forecast: Sonny & Red (1976) | I Remember Bird (1977) | Sonny Stitt with Strings: A Tribute to Duke Ellington (1977) |

I Remember Bird is an album by American jazz saxophonist Sonny Stitt featuring performances recorded in 1976 for the Catalyst label.

== Reception ==
Professional ratings
Review scores
| Source | Rating |
|---|---|
| Allmusic | 4.5/5 stars |

AllMusic awarded the album 4½ stars, stating, "Sonny Stitt, who spent his entire career playing in a style built on Bird's, is in good form during this quintet date".

== Track listing ==
| No. | Title | Writer(s) | Length |
|---|---|---|---|
| 1. | "Waltz For Diane" | Frank Rosolino | 6:07 |
| 2. | "Body and Soul" | Johnny Green, Edward Heyman, Robert Sour, Frank Eyton | 5:14 |
| 3. | "Jeepers Creepers" | Harry Warren, Johnny Mercer | 9:10 |
| 4. | "Streamlined Stanley" | Sonny Stitt | 3:55 |
| 5. | "I Remember Bird" | Leonard Feather | 5:08 |
| 6. | "Watch What Happens" | Michel Legrand | 8:33 |
| 7. | "Yes Jesus Loves Me" | Anna Bartlett Warner | 7:17 |
| Total length: | | | 45:24 |

== Personnel ==
- Sonny Stitt – tenor saxophone
- Frank Rosolino – trombone
- Dolo Coker – piano
- Allen Jackson – bass
- Clarence Johnston – drums
