= New Morning (Johnny Coles album) =

Studio album by Johnny Coles Quartet
- Released: 1983
- Recorded: December 19, 1982
- Studio: Studio 44, Monster, Netherlands
- Genre: Jazz
- Length: 58:28
- Label: Criss Cross Jazz; Criss 1005
- Producer: Gerry Teekens

Johnny Coles chronology
Katumbo (Dance) (1971)	New Morning (1983)	Two at the Top (1983)

New Morning is an album led by jazz trumpeter Johnny Coles which was recorded in 1982 and released by the Criss Cross Jazz label.

== Reception ==
Professional ratings
Review scores
Source	Rating
AllMusic	4/5 stars
The Penguin Guide to Jazz Recordings	4/4 stars

The AllMusic review by Scott Yanow states "Best-remembered for being part of Charles Mingus' 1964 Sextet, Coles had continued growing as a trumpeter through the years while keeping his brittle sound and advanced hard bop style ... The fresh material and Coles' enthusiastic solos make this an album worth picking up."

== Track listing ==
All compositions by Johnny Coles except where noted

1. "Super 80" (Charles Davis) – 9:58
2. "Sound of Love" (Charles Mingus) – 6:38
3. "Mister B." – 6:56
4. "New Morning" – 6:11
5. "United" (Wayne Shorter) – 5:41
6. "I Don't Know Yet" – 6:31

== Personnel ==
- Johnny Coles – trumpet
- Horace Parlan − piano
- Reggie Johnson − bass
- Billy Hart – drums
