= Never Again! (James Moody album) =

Studio album by James Moody
- Released: 1972
- Recorded: June 8, 1972
- Studio: RCA Studios, New York City
- Genre: Jazz
- Length: 43:10
- Label: Muse; MR 5001
- Producer: Don Schlitten

James Moody chronology
Chicago Concert (1971)	Never Again! (1972)	Feelin' It Together (1973)

Professional ratings
Review scores
Source	Rating
Allmusic	4.5/5 stars

Never Again! is an album by saxophonist James Moody recorded in 1972 and released on the Muse label. It was the first album released on the label.

== Reception ==
Allmusic awarded the album 4½ stars with a review stating, "The "Never Again" title refers to James Moody's pledge to stick to tenor and not play alto anymore. He did not reach that goal 100% in the future but did successfully shift his emphasis to tenor which he plays exclusively on this superior Muse LP... Highly recommended".

== Track listing ==
All compositions by James Moody except as indicated

1. "Never Again" - 4:27
2. "Secret Love" (Sammy Fain, Paul Francis Webster) - 6:33
3. " A Little 3 For L.C." (Mickey Tucker) - 8:40
4. "St. Thomas" (Sonny Rollins) - 6:01
5. "This One's for You" (Tucker) - 5:13
6. "Freedom Jazz Dance" (Eddie Harris) - 8:37

== Personnel ==
- James Moody - tenor saxophone
- Mickey Tucker - organ
- Roland Wilson - electric bass
- Eddie Gladden - drums
