= Feelin' It Together =

Studio album by James Moody
- Released: 1974
- Recorded: January 15, 1973
- Studio: Mediasound, New York City
- Genre: Jazz
- Length: 44:28
- Label: Muse; MR 5020
- Producer: Don Schlitten

James Moody chronology
Never Again! (1972)	Feelin' It Together (1974)	Sax & Flute Man (1973)

Professional ratings
Review scores
Source	Rating
Allmusic	4/5 stars
Christgau's Record Guide	B+
The Penguin Guide to Jazz Recordings	3/4 stars

Feelin' It Together is an album by saxophonist James Moody recorded in 1973 and released on the Muse label.

== Reception ==
Allmusic awarded the album 4 stars with a review stating, "James Moody has an opportunity to show off his versatility on Feelin' It Together. He switches between tenor, alto and flute (excelling on all three instruments) with a quartet... Stimulating music".

== Track listing ==
All compositions by Kenny Barron except as indicated

1. "Anthropology" (Dizzy Gillespie, Charlie Parker) - 9:05
2. "Dreams" - 4:54
3. "Autumn Leaves" (Joseph Kosma, Johnny Mercer, Jacques Prévert) - 9:19
4. "Wave" (Antônio Carlos Jobim) - 7:42
5. "Morning Glory" - 7:17
6. "Kriss Kross" (Art Hillery, Red Holloway) - 5:34

== Personnel ==
- James Moody - tenor saxophone, alto saxophone, flute
- Kenny Barron - piano, electric piano, harpsichord
- Larry Ridley - bass
- Freddie Waits - drums, percussion, tin flute
