= Moody with Strings =

James Moody

Studio album by James Moody
- Released: 1961
- Recorded: July 5 & 6, 1960 and January 16, 1961; New York City
- Genre: Jazz
- Label: Argo; LP 679
- Producer: Jack Tracy

James Moody chronology
Hey! It's James Moody (1960)	James Moody (1961)	Cookin' the Blues (1961)

Moody with Strings is an album by saxophonist James Moody recorded in 1960 and 1961 and released on the Argo label.

== Reception ==
Professional ratings
Review scores
Source	Rating
Allmusic	3/5 stars

The Allmusic site awarded the album 3 stars.

== Track listing ==
1. "Dorothee" - 3:11
2. "Love For Sale" (Cole Porter) - 3:32
3. "Another Day" - 3:50
4. "All My Life" (Sidney D. Mitchell, Sam H. Stept) - 3:20
5. "I'm Old Fashioned" (Jerome Kern, Johnny Mercer) - 2:25
6. "Fools Rush In" (Rube Bloom, Mercer) - 3:34
7. "Somerset" - 4:23
8. "I Remember Clifford" (Benny Golson) - 4:01
9. "Love Walked In" (George Gershwin, Ira Gershwin) - 2:38
10. "A Song of Love" - 3:03
11. "Dorian Mood" - 4:49

== Personnel ==
- James Moody - alto saxophone, tenor saxophone, flute
- Burt Collins, Irvin Markowitz, Don Stratton - trumpet (tracks 2, 5, 7 & 9)
- Tom McIntosh, Freddie Zito - trombone (tracks 2, 5, 7 & 9)
- Ray Alonge (tracks 2, 3, 5–7, 9 & 11), John Barrows (tracks 3, 6 & 11), Richard Berg (tracks 2, 5, 7 & 9), Jim Buffington (tracks 3, 6 & 11) - French horn
- Phil Bonder, Leon Cohen, Joseph Soldo - woodwinds (tracks 3, 6 & 11)
- Don Butterfield - tuba (tracks 2, 5, 7 & 9)
- Hank Jones (tracks 1, 4, 8 & 10), Tommy Flanagan (tracks 3, 6 & 11) - piano
- John Beal (tracks 1, 4, 8 & 10), George Duvivier (tracks 2, 3, 5–7, 9 & 11) - bass
- Tom Gillen (tracks 2, 5, 7 & 9), Osie Johnson (tracks 1, 4, 8 & 10), Charlie Persip (tracks 3, 6 & 11) - drums
- Torrie Zito - piano (tracks 2, 5, 7 & 9) arranger, conductor
- Unidentified large string orchestra (tracks 1, 4, 8 & 10)
