= Comin' On Strong (James Moody album) =

Studio album by James Moody
- Released: 1964
- Recorded: September 16, 1963
- Studio: Ter-Mar Recording Studio, Chicago, Illinois
- Genre: Jazz
- Label: Argo; LP 740
- Producer: Esmond Edwards

James Moody chronology
| Great Day (1963) | Comin' On Strong (1964) | Running the Gamut (1964) |

Comin' On Strong is an album by saxophonist James Moody recorded in 1963 and released on the Argo label.

== Reception ==
Professional ratings
Review scores
| Source | Rating |
|---|---|
| Allmusic | 4/5 stars |

Jason Ankeny of Allmusic states: "Comin' on Strong ranks among James Moody's most challenging and rewarding sessions — with its complex rhythms and mercurial tempos, the material is more like a series of obstacle courses than a collection of melodies, but Moody and his collaborators navigate the twists and turns with dexterity and grace".

== Track listing ==
All compositions by Tom McIntosh, except as indicated

1. "In Other Words (Fly Me to the Moon)" (Bart Howard) — 4:40
2. "Dizzy" (James Moody) — 3:38
3. "Autumn Leaves" (Joseph Kosma, Johnny Mercer, Jacques Prévert) — 6:30
4. "Ole" (Dizzy Gillespie) — 4:39
5. "Sonnymoon for Two" (Sonny Rollins) — 4:46
6. "I've Grown Accustomed to Her Face" (Alan Jay Lerner, Frederick Loewe) — 3:05
7. "Zanzibar" (Esmond Edwards) — 4:01
8. "Please Send Me Someone to Love" (Percy Mayfield) — 5:34

== Personnel ==
- James Moody - tenor saxophone, flute
- Kenny Barron - piano (tracks 1–3, 5, 7 & 9), organ (tracks 4 & 6)
- George Eskridge - guitar
- Chris White - bass
- Rudy Collins - drums
