= Forecast: Sonny & Red =

Studio album by Sonny Stitt with Red Holloway
- Released: 1976
- Recorded: 1976; Sage & Sound Studios, Hollywood, CA
- Genre: Jazz
- Label: Catalyst; CAT-7608
- Producer: Pat Britt

Sonny Stitt chronology
Stomp Off Let's Go (1976)	Forecast: Sonny & Red (1976)	I Remember Bird (1976)

Red Holloway chronology
Red Soul (1965)	Forecast: Sonny & Red (1976)	Hittin' the Road Again (1982)

Forecast: Sonny & Red is an album by American jazz saxophonists Sonny Stitt and Red Holloway featuring performances recorded in 1976 for the Catalyst label.

== Reception ==
Professional ratings
Review scores
Source	Rating
AllMusic	4.5/5 stars

Scott Yanow of Allmusic stated, "Sonny Stitt and Red Holloway make a perfect team on this exciting jam session record... Holloway was able to keep up with the combative Stitt and the fireworks are well worth savoring".

== Track listing ==
1. "The Way You Look Tonight" (Jerome Kern, Dorothy Fields) - 5:20
2. "Forecast: Sonny & Red" (Art Hillery) - 4:50
3. "You Don't Know What Love Is/I'm Getting Sentimental Over You" (Gene de Paul, Don Ray/George Bassman, Ned Washington) - 10:45
4. "Lester Leaps In" (Lester Young) - 6:42
5. "Just Friends" (John Klenner, Sam M. Lewis) - 6:20
6. "All God's Chillun Got Rhythm" (Bronisław Kaper, Walter Jurmann, Gus Kahn) - 4:00

== Personnel ==
- Sonny Stitt - tenor saxophone
- Red Holloway - tenor saxophone, alto saxophone
- Art Hillery - piano
- Larry Gales - bass
- Clarence Johnston - drums
