= Johnny Coles =

American jazz trumpeter (1926–1997)

Background information
- Born: July 3, 1926; Trenton, New Jersey, U.S.
- Died: December 21, 1997 (aged 71); Philadelphia, U.S.
- Genres: Jazz
- Occupation: Musician
- Instrument: Trumpet
- Years active: late 1940s – early 1990s

John Coles (July 3, 1926 – December 21, 1997) was an American jazz trumpeter.

== Early life ==
Coles was born in Trenton, New Jersey, on July 3, 1926. He grew up in Philadelphia and was self-taught on trumpet.

== Later life and career ==
Coles spent his early career playing with R&B groups, including those of Eddie Vinson (1948–1951), Bull Moose Jackson (1952), and Earl Bostic (1955–1956). He was with James Moody from 1956 to 1958, and played with Gil Evans's orchestra between 1958 and 1964, including for the album Out of the Cool. After this, he spent time with Charles Mingus in his sextet, which also included Eric Dolphy, Clifford Jordan, Jaki Byard, and Dannie Richmond. Following this he played with Herbie Hancock (1968–1969), Ray Charles (1969–1971), Duke Ellington (1971–1974), Art Blakey (1976), Dameronia, Mingus Dynasty, and the Count Basie Orchestra under the direction of Thad Jones (1985–1986).

In 1985, Coles settled in the San Francisco Bay Area; he recorded with Frank Morgan and Chico Freeman the following year. After his return to Philadelphia in 1989, he again worked with Morgan and was part of Gene Harris's Philip Morris Superband. In 1990, Coles recorded with Charles Earland and Buck Hill. Coles recorded as a leader several times over the course of his career. He died of cancer on December 21, 1997, in Philadelphia.

== Discography ==
=== As leader ===
- The Warm Sound (Epic, 1961)
- Little Johnny C (Blue Note, 1963)
- Katumbo (Dance) (Mainstream, 1971)
- New Morning (Criss Cross Jazz, 1982)
- Two at the Top (Uptown, 1983) with Frank Wess

=== As sideman ===
With Geri Allen

- Some Aspects of Water (Storyville, 1996)

With Tina Brooks

- The Waiting Game (Blue Note, 1961)

With Ray Crawford

- I Know Pres [aka Smooth Groove] (Candid, 1961 [1971])

With Gil Evans

- New Bottle Old Wine (World Pacific, 1958)
- Great Jazz Standards (World Pacific, 1959)
- Out of the Cool (Impulse!, 1960)
- The Individualism of Gil Evans (Verve, 1964)
- Blues in Orbit (Enja, 1971)
- Where Flamingos Fly (Artists House, 1971 [1981])
- Bud and Bird (Electric Bird/King, 1986 [1987])
- Farewell (Evidence, 1986 [1992])

With Booker Ervin

- Booker 'n' Brass (Pacific Jazz, 1967)

With Astrud Gilberto

- Look to the Rainbow (Verve, 1966)

With Grant Green

- Am I Blue (Blue Note, 1962)

With Herbie Hancock

- The Prisoner (Blue Note, 1969)
- Fat Albert Rotunda (Warner Bros., 1969)

With Buck Hill

- The Buck Stops Here (Muse, 1992)

With Etta Jones

- Christmas with Etta Jones (Muse, 1990)

With Philly Joe Jones Dameronia

- To Tadd with Love (Uptown, 1982)

With Charles Mingus

- Charles Mingus Sextet with Eric Dolphy Cornell 1964 (Blue Note, 1964 [2007])
- Town Hall Concert (Fantasy, 1964)
- Revenge! (Revenge, 1964 [1996])
- The Great Concert of Charles Mingus (America, 1964)
- Hope so Eric Volume 1 Charles Mingus Orchestra, with Eric Dolphy 1964 (Italy: Ingo, 1964)

With James Moody

- Flute 'n the Blues (Argo, 1956)
- Moody's Mood for Love (Argo, 1956)
- James Moody (Argo, 1959)
- Great Day (Argo, 1963)
- The Blues and Other Colors (Milestone, 1969)

With Frank Morgan

- Bebop Lives! (Contemporary, 1987)

With Horace Parlan

- Happy Frame of Mind (Blue Note, 1963; first issued as part of the double LP Back from the Gig by Booker Ervin, 1976)

With Duke Pearson

- Hush! (Jazzline, 1962)
- Honeybuns (Atlantic, 1965)
- Prairie Dog (Atlantic, 1966)

With A. K. Salim

- Stable Mates (Savoy, 1957)
- Afro-Soul/Drum Orgy (Prestige, 1965)
