= Mocha Motion! =

Studio album by Freddie Roach
- Released: July 1967
- Recorded: January 5, 1967
- Studio: Van Gelder Studio, Englewood Cliffs, NJ
- Genre: Soul jazz
- Length: 36:35
- Label: Prestige; PRLP 7507
- Producer: Ozzie Cadena

Freddie Roach chronology
The Freddie Roach Soul Book (1966)	Mocha Motion! (1967)	My People (Soul People) (1967)

Mocha Motion! is an album by American organist Freddie Roach released on Prestige in 1967.

Professional ratings
Review scores
Source	Rating
Allmusic	2.5/5 stars

== Track listing ==
All compositions tracks by Freddie Roach, unless otherwise noted

1. "Samba de Orfeu" (Bonfá) - 5:24
2. "(Good) Morning Time" - 5:35
3. "Money (That's What I Want)" (Bradford, Gordy) - 4:25
4. "Stinky Fingers" - 4:01
5. "Here Comes the Mocha Man" - 5:19
6. "Johnnie's Comin' Home No More" - 5:17
7. "Warning Shot" (Goldsmith) - 6:34

== Personnel ==
- Freddie Roach - organ, vocals (#6)
- Vinnie Corrao - guitar
- Eddie Gladden - drums
- Ralph Dorsey - congas
