= Two at the Top =

Studio album by Frank Wess and Johnny Coles
- Released: 1983
- Recorded: June 8 & 9, 1983
- Studios: Van Gelder Studio Englewood Cliffs, NJ
- Genre: Jazz
- Length: 138:39 CD reissue with additional tracks and bonus disc
- Labels: Uptown; UP 27.14
- Producers: Mark Feldman MD., Robert E. Sunenblick MD.

Frank Wess chronology
| Flute Juice (1981) | Two at the Top (1983) | Two for the Blues (1984) |

Johnny Coles chronology
| New Morning (1982) | Two at the Top (1983) |

Two at the Top is an album by saxophonist/flautist Frank Wess and flugelhornist Johnny Coles, recorded and released on the Uptown label in 1983. The original album was rereleased on CD in 2012 along with one additional number and five alternate takes and a bonus live disc recorded in 1988.

== Reception ==
Professional ratings
Review scores
| Source | Rating |
|---|---|
| AllMusic | 4/5 stars |
| Tom Hull | B+ |

The AllMusic review by Ken Dryden said "Two at the Top is one of the label's finest releases, a session pairing Frank Wess and the unjustly neglected Johnny Coles, accompanied by a potent rhythm section Highly recommended". On All About Jazz Marc Myers called it "a powerfully superb jazz album".

== Track listing ==
Disc One:

1. "Whistle Stop" (Kenny Dorham) – 6:03
2. "Morning Star" (Rodgers Grant) – 5:38
3. "Celia" (Bud Powell) – 5:04
4. "Nica's Tempo" (Gigi Gryce) – 6:42
5. "Minority" (Gryce) – 5:49
6. "Ill Wind" (Harold Arlen, Ted Koehler) – 6:36
7. "Stablemates" (Benny Golson) – 6:12
8. "An Oscar for Oscar" (Dorham) – 4:21
9. "A Blue Time" (Tadd Dameron) – 6:53 Additional track on CD release
10. "An Oscar for Oscar" [Take One] (Dorham) – 4:21 Additional track on CD release
11. "Stablemates" [Take One] (Golson) – 5:05 Additional track on CD release
12. "Minority" [Take One] (Gryce) – 5:10 Additional track on CD release
13. "Whistle Stop" [Take One] (Dorham) – 4:40 Additional track on CD release
14. "Morning Star" [Take One] (Grant) – 5:38 Additional track on CD release

Disc Two: Live at Yoshi's 1988

1. "One for Amos" (Sam Jones) – 14:37
2. "If You Can't Call, Don't Come [aka Don't Come, Don't Call]" (Frank Wess) – 9:25
3. "Morning Star" (Grant) – 9:03
4. "Minority" (Gryce) – 12:09
5. "Blues for David" (Charles "Buddy" Montgomery) – 15:03
- Recorded at Yoshi's, Oakland, CA on January 15, 1988

== Personnel ==
- Frank Wess – alto saxophone, tenor saxophone, flute
- Johnny Coles – flugelhorn
- Kenny Barron (Disc One), Smith Dobson (Disc Two) – piano
- Reggie Johnson (Disc One), Larry Grenadier (Disc Two) – double bass
- Kenny Washington (Disc One), Donald 'Duck' Bailey (Disc Two) – drums
- Don Sickler – arranger (Disc One)
