= Percy France =

American jazz tenor saxophonist

- Born: Percy France; August 15, 1928; New York City, New York, United States
- Died: January 4, 1992 (aged 63) New York City, New York, United States
- Genres: Swing, hard bop, soul jazz, R&B
- Occupation: Musician
- Instruments: Tenor saxophone, clarinet
- Years active: 1949–1990
- Labels: Blue Note, King
- Formerly of: Jimmy Smith, Bill Doggett, Lance Hayward, Freddie Roach

Percy France (August 15, 1928 – January 4, 1992) was an American jazz tenor saxophonist. France gained particular recognition during the 1950s and early 1960s as a sideman for Jimmy Smith, Freddie Roach and Bill Doggett and was considered by his contemporary, Sonny Rollins, as "one of the tenor players that I had to compete with when I was making my reputation as a young saxophonist. He was probably the best player around at that time; I never could beat him."

== Biography ==
Percy France was born and raised in New York City, living in the prominent black communities of San Juan Hill and Sugar Hill, and attended Benjamin Franklin High School alongside Sonny Rollins. France studied piano and clarinet from an early age. Demonstrating particular aptitude as a woodwind player, France moved on to tenor saxophone at the age of 13.

Though France's recording career began in 1949 as a sideman for singer Betty Mays, it was not until 1952 that he became a distinctive saxophone addition to Bill Doggett's organ group. The Bill Doggett group was among the most popular R&B acts of the era but it was also a vehicle for interpretations of popular jazz standards and ballads. Reflecting on his time performing with France in 1992, Doggett praised his "unique ability to be able to build a solo. He would start off simply... and pick you up and carry you with him with his solos, as a singer would do, just lift you, and you don't know what's happening to you, but you're enjoying it."

After leaving Bill Doggett's group France began a brief association with Blue Note Records, featuring on sessions including Jimmy Smith's Home Cookin' album and Down to Earth by Freddie Roach. France also performed with Sir Charles Thompson and appeared on Thompson's And The Swing Organ album.

France's career tapered off in the 1960s but he returned to active performing in his native New York City in the 1970s and 1980s, performing at The West End Bar and other clubs as leader of his own groups and with others including Sammy Price's Two-Tenor Boogie, Joe Albany's New Yorkers and Jo Jones and Friends.

France toured Europe in the winter of 1982 and 1983 with the Oliver Jackson Trio, and the group recorded an album for the French Black & Blue label in September 1982. France replaced Buddy Tate in Sammy Price's Two-Tenor Boogie in 1982 and stayed with Price thru April 1990, when a performance was broadcast by WKCR-FM. In 1987 the group performed at the Bern Jazz Festival.

In 1988, at the recommendation of jazz disc jockey and historian Phil Schaap, France was hired by Simon & Schuster to improvise saxophone interludes for a series of Mickey Spillane's Mike Hammer books-on-tape which were narrated by Stacy Keach.

France stopped performing in New York City in 1990 after receiving a cancer diagnosis. France was fatally struck by a vehicle as a pedestrian in 1992 and died at the age of 63.

== Discography ==
=== As leader ===
- I Should Care (Endgame Records, 2000)

=== As sideman ===
with Betti Mays And Her Swingtet

- Mays' Haze / Slow Rock (Regal Records, 1949)

with The "5" Royales

- Dedicated to You (King Records, 1957)

with Bill Doggett

- Dance Awhile with Doggett (King Records, 1958)
- The Many Moods of Bill Doggett (King Records, 1961)
- Leaps and Bounds (Charly R&B, 1952-1959 [rel. 1991])

with Sir Charles Thompson

- Sir Charles Thompson and The Swing Organ (Columbia, 1959 [rel. 1960])

with Jimmy Smith

- Home Cookin' (Blue Note, 1959 [rel. 1961])

with Freddie Roach

- Down to Earth (Blue Note, 1962)

with Oliver Jackson

- Oliver Jackson Presents Le Quartet (Black & Blue, 1982 [rel. 1983])

with Lance Hayward

- Live at Eddie Condon's (Town Crier Recordings, 1984)
- That's All! (Town Crier Recordings, 1984)
- A Closer Walk (Town Crier Recordings, 1992)
