= Moody and the Brass Figures =

Studio album by James Moody
- Released: 1966
- Recorded: October 1, 1966
- Studio: Plaza Sound Studios, New York City
- Genre: Jazz
- Length: 37:43
- Label: Milestone; MLP 1005
- Producer: Orrin Keepnews

James Moody chronology
Running the Gamut (1964)	Moody and the Brass Figures (1966)	The Blues and Other Colors (1968)

Moody and the Brass Figures is an album by saxophonist James Moody recorded in 1966 and released on the Milestone label.

== Reception ==
Professional ratings
Review scores
Source	Rating
Allmusic	4/5 stars
The Penguin Guide to Jazz Recordings	3.5/4 stars

Scott Yanow of Allmusic states, "Not content to be a mere bebop revivalist, Moody is heard throughout pushing himself".

== Track listing ==
All compositions by James Moody except as indicated

1. "Smack-A-Mac" (Tom McIntosh) - 3:39
2. "Bess, You Is My Woman Now" (George Gershwin, DuBose Heyward) - 4:02
3. "Cherokee" (Ray Noble) - 3:50
4. "Love, Where Are You?" - 3:32
5. "The Moon Was Yellow" (Fred E. Ahlert, Edgar Leslie) - 4:30
6. "Au Privave" (Charlie Parker) - 3:53
7. "Ruby, My Dear" (Thelonious Monk) - 5:13
8. "Simplicity and Beauty" - 3:29
9. "Never Again" - 5:35

== Personnel ==
- James Moody - tenor saxophone, flute
- Snooky Young- trumpet (tracks 1, 2, 4, 6 & 8)
- Joe Newman, Jimmy Owens - trumpet, flugelhorn (tracks 1, 2, 4, 6 & 8)
- Jimmy Cleveland - trombone (tracks 1, 2, 4, 6 & 8)
- Don Butterfield - tuba (tracks 1, 2, 4, 6 & 8)
- Kenny Barron - piano
- Bob Cranshaw - bass
- Mel Lewis - drums
- Tom McIntosh - arranger, conductor (tracks 1, 2, 4, 6 & 8)
