= The Blues and Other Colors =

Studio album by James Moody
- Released: 1969
- Recorded: August 14, 1968, and January 3 & February 11, 1969
- Studio: Plaza Sound Studios, New York City
- Genre: Jazz
- Length: 34:21
- Label: Milestone; MSP 9023
- Producer: Orrin Keepnews

James Moody chronology
Moody and the Brass Figures (1966)	The Blues and Other Colors (1969)	Don't Look Away Now! (1969)

The Blues and Other Colors is an album by saxophonist James Moody recorded in 1968 and 1969 and released on the Milestone label.

== Reception ==
Professional ratings
Review scores
Source	Rating
Allmusic	4/5 stars
The Penguin Guide to Jazz Recordings	2.5/4 stars

Scott Yanow of Allmusic states, "Best known for his tenor and alto playing (although he is also recognized as a talented flutist), Moody is here heard exclusively on soprano and flute... Moody plays quite well and sounds surprisingly effective on soprano, an instrument he would rarely return to in the future".

== Track listing ==
All compositions by James Moody except as indicated

1. "Main Stem" (Duke Ellington) – 3:37
2. "Everyone Needs It" – 4:06
3. "Savannah Calling" – 4:14
4. "A Statement" – 5:17
5. "Gone Are the Days" (Stephen Foster) – 3:03
6. "Feeling Low" – 4:53
7. "You Got to Pay" (Tom McIntosh) – 3:22
8. "Old Folks" (Dedette Lee Hill, Willard Robison) – 5:49

== Personnel ==
- James Moody – soprano saxophone, flute
- Tom McIntosh – trombone, arranger, conductor
- Johnny Coles – trumpet (tracks 1–4 & 8)
- Britt Woodman – trombone (tracks 5–7)
- Jim Buffington – French horn (tracks 5–7)
- Joe Farrell – alto flute, oboe, alto saxophone (tracks 1–4 & 8)
- Cecil Payne – baritone saxophone (tracks 1–4 & 8)
- Kenny Barron (tracks 1–4 & 8), Dick Katz (tracks 5–7) – piano
- Alfred Brown – viola (tracks 5–7)
- Charles McCracken, Kermit Moore – cello (tracks 5–7)
- Ron Carter (tracks 1 & 4–8), Ben Tucker (tracks 2 & 3) – bass, electric bass
- Connie Kay (tracks 5–7), Freddie Waits (tracks 1–4 & 8) – drums
- Linda November – vocals (tracks 5–7)
