= Mo' Greens Please =

Studio album by Freddie Roach
- Released: 1963
- Recorded: January 21 & March 11, 1963
- Studio: Van Gelder Studio, Englewood Cliffs, NJ
- Genre: Jazz
- Length: 38:11
- Label: Blue Note; BST 84128
- Producer: Alfred Lion

Freddie Roach chronology
Down to Earth (1962)	Mo' Greens Please (1963)	Good Move! (1963)

Mo' Greens Please is the second album by American organist Freddie Roach recorded in 1963 and released on the Blue Note label. It was reissued on CD only in Japan, as a limited edition.

== Reception ==
Professional ratings
Review scores
Source	Rating
Allmusic	4/5 stars

The Allmusic review by Jason Ankeny awarded the album 4 stars and stated "for all its stylistic detours the album hangs together beautifully -- each of the players is at the top of his respective game, and in particular Roach attacks the organ with all the passion and flair of his most incendiary outings".

== Track listing ==
All compositions by Freddie Roach except where noted

1. "Googa Mooga" - 3:28
2. "Baby Don't You Cry" (Buddy Johnson, Ned Washington) - 4:09
3. "Party Time" - 3:16
4. "Nada Bossa" - 3:02
5. "Mo' Greens Please" - 4:21
6. "Blues in the Front Room" - 4:46
7. "I Know" (Barbara George) - 3:18
8. "Is You Is or Is You Ain't My Baby" (Louis Jordan, Billy Austin) - 3:49
9. "Unchained Melody" (Alex North, Hy Zaret) - 4:59
10. "Two Different Worlds" (Sid Wayne, Al Frisch) - 3:03

Recorded on January 21 (2–3, 6–8) and March 11 (1, 4–5, 9–10), 1963.

== Personnel ==
- Freddie Roach - organ
- Conrad Lester - tenor saxophone (1, 4–5, 9–10)
- Kenny Burrell (2–3, 6–8), Eddie Wright (1, 4–5, 9–10) - guitar
- Clarence Johnston - drums
