= Bel Hommage =

Studio album by Patti LaBelle
- Released: May 5, 2017
- Length: 52:27
- Label: GPE
- Producer: Patti LaBelle; Jamar Jones

Patti LaBelle chronology
Live in Washington, D.C. (2008)	Bel Hommage (2017)	Home for the Holidays with Friends (2017)

Bel Hommage is a studio album by American singer Patti LaBelle. It was released by GPE Records on May 5, 2017, in the United States. LaBelle's first regular studio album in a decade, she worked with Jamar Jones on the album.

== Critical reception ==
Professional ratings
Review scores
Source	Rating
Allmusic	3.5/5 stars

Andy Kellman from Allmusic felt that "predominantly acoustic, the set is lively throughout, winding through fiery ballads [...] and rollicking culinary [...] LaBelle is expressive as ever. When she reaches the "And I know you cheat" line in "Don't Explain," she sounds like she might be holding a freshly sharpened knife behind her back. "Song for Old Lovers," a Jacques Brel/Gérard Jouannest composition that requires very specific life experience to be interpreted convincingly, is one of LaBelle's most restrained, pained, and affectionate performances. Those who just want to hear her let it rip get it on versions of "The Jazz in You" and "Go to Hell."

== Track listing ==
All tracks produced by Patti LaBelle and Jamar Jones.

No.	Title	Length
1.	"The Jazz in You"	4:01
2.	"Wild Is the Wind"	5:26
3.	"Moanin'"	2:44
4.	"Till I Get It Right"	3:22
5.	"Moody's Mood"	3:07
6.	"Softly, as I Leave You"	3:46
7.	"Peel Me a Grape"	3:47
8.	"Don't Explain"	4:04
9.	"I Can Cook"	3:46
10.	"Folks Who Live on the Hill"	3:44
11.	"Go to Hell"	3:36
12.	"Song for Old Lovers"	5:56
13.	"Here's to Life"	5:23

== Charts ==
Chart (2017)	Peak position
US Top Jazz Albums (Billboard)	2
