= Chicago Concert =

Live album by James Moody and Gene Ammons
- Released: 1973
- Recorded: November 21, 1971
- Venue: North Park Hotel, Chicago, Illinois
- Genre: Jazz
- Length: 53:55 CD reissue with bonus track
- Label: Prestige; PR 10065
- Producer: Ozzie Cadena

Gene Ammons chronology
My Way (1971)	Chicago Concert (1973)	Free Again (1972)

James Moody chronology
Heratige Hum (1971)	Chicago Concert (1971)	Never Again! (1972)

Chicago Concert is a live album by saxophonists James Moody and Gene Ammons recorded in Chicago in 1971 and released on the Prestige label.

== Reception ==
Professional ratings
Review scores
Source	Rating
Allmusic	2.5/5 stars
The Penguin Guide to Jazz Recordings	2/4 stars

The Allmusic review by Scott Yanow stated "This meeting between Gene Ammons and James Moody is not as memorable as one might hope... although there are a few sparks, they do not blend together that well and the results are surprisingly workmanlike".

== Track listing ==
1. "Just in Time" (Betty Comden, Adolph Greenl, Jule Styne) - 6:49
2. "Work Song" (Nat Adderley) - 8:11
3. "Have You Met Miss Jones?" (Lorenz Hart, Richard Rodgers) - 6:32
4. "Jim-Jam-Jug" (Gene Ammons) - 8:17
5. "I'll Close My Eyes" (Buddy Kaye, Billy Reid) - 4:56
6. "C Jam Blues" (Barney Bigard, Duke Ellington) - 5:04
7. "Yardbird Suite" (Charlie Parker) - 14:06 Bonus track on CD reissue

== Personnel ==
- Gene Ammons, James Moody - tenor saxophone
- Jodie Christian - piano
- Cleveland Eaton - bass
- Marshall Thompson - drums
