= Good Move! =

Studio album by Freddie Roach
- Released: 1963
- Recorded: November 29 & December 9, 1963
- Studio: Van Gelder Studio, Englewood Cliffs, NJ
- Genre: Jazz
- Length: 43:02
- Label: Blue Note; BST 84158
- Producer: Alfred Lion

Freddie Roach chronology
Mo' Greens Please (1963)	Good Move! (1963)	Brown Sugar (1964)

Good Move! is the third album by American organist Freddie Roach recorded in 1963 and released on the Blue Note label.

== Reception ==
Professional ratings
Review scores
Source	Rating
Allmusic	4/5 stars

The Allmusic review by Stephen Thomas Erlewine awarded the album 4 stars and stated "Laid-back and loosely swinging, Good Move captures organist Freddie Roach near the peak of his form. Roach never leans too heavily on his instrument, preferring a calmer, tasteful attack, yet he is never boring because he has a strong sense of groove".

== Track listing ==
All compositions by Freddie Roach except where noted

1. "It Ain't Necessarily So" (George Gershwin, Ira Gershwin) - 5:02
2. "When Malindy Sings" (Oscar Brown Jr., Paul Laurence Dunbar) - 5:20
3. "Pastel" (Erroll Garner) - 4:31
4. "Wine, Wine, Wine" - 6:31
5. "On Our Way Up" - 6:20
6. "T'ain't What You Do (It's the Way That You Do It)" (Sy Oliver, Trummy Young) - 4:58
7. "Lots of Lovely Love" (Richard Rodgers) - 4:59
8. "I.Q. Blues" - 5:21

Recorded on November 29, 1963 (1, 3, 6 & 8) and December 9, 1963 (2, 4, 5 & 7).

== Personnel ==
- Freddie Roach - organ
- Blue Mitchell - trumpet (tracks 2, 4, 5 & 7)
- Hank Mobley - tenor saxophone (2, 4, 5 & 7)
- Eddie Wright - guitar
- Clarence Johnston - drums

== Charts ==
Chart (2025)	Peak position
Greek Albums (IFPI)	88
