= Katumbo (Dance) =

Studio album by Johnny Coles
- Released: 1971
- Recorded: 1971 in NYC
- Genre: Jazz
- Length: 30:45
- Label: Mainstream; MRL 346
- Producer: Bob Shad

Johnny Coles chronology
Little Johnny C (1963)	Katumbo (Dance) (1971)	New Morning (1982)

Katumbo (Dance) is an album by American trumpeter Johnny Coles recorded in 1971 for the Mainstream label.

== Reception ==
Professional ratings
Review scores
Source	Rating
AllMusic	3/5 stars

AllMusic awarded the album 3 stars.

== Track listing ==
1. "Never Can Say Goodbye" (Clifton Davis) - 3:01
2. "The September of My Years" (Jimmy Van Heusen, Sammy Cahn) - 5:29
3. "728" (Johnny Coles) - 7:17
4. "Petits Machins" (Miles Davis, Gil Evans) - 3:41
5. "Betty's Bossa" (Cecil Bridgewater) - 4:28
6. "Funk Dumplin'" (Coles) - 6:49

== Personnel ==
- Johnny Coles - trumpet, flugelhorn
- Astley Fennell - trombone
- Howard Johnson - tuba
- Gregory Herbert - tenor saxophone
- Cedar Walton - piano, electric piano
- Reggie Workman - electric bass
- Bruce Ditmas - drums
