= Don't Look Away Now! =

Studio album by James Moody
- Released: 1969
- Recorded: February 14, 1969; New York City
- Genre: Jazz
- Length: 39:43
- Label: Prestige; PR 7625
- Producer: Don Schlitten

James Moody chronology
| The Blues and Other Colors (1969) | Don't Look Away Now! (1969) | Teachers (1970) |

Don't Look Away Now! is an album by saxophonist James Moody recorded in 1969 which was released on the Prestige label.

== Reception ==
Professional ratings
Review scores
| Source | Rating |
|---|---|
| Allmusic | 4.5/5 stars |
| The Penguin Guide to Jazz Recordings | 3/4 stars |

The Allmusic site awarded the album 4½ stars.

== Track listing ==
All compositions by James Moody except as indicated

1. "Don't Look Away Now" – 3:19
2. "Darben the Redd Fox" – 7:10
3. "Easy Living" (Ralph Rainger, Leo Robin) – 5:33
4. "Hey Herb! Where's Alpert?" – 3:36
5. "Hear Me" – 9:26
6. "When I Fall in Love" (Edward Heyman, Victor Young) – 6:07
7. "Last Train from Overbrook" – 4:32

== Personnel ==
- James Moody – tenor saxophone, alto saxophone
- Barry Harris – piano
- Bob Cranshaw – electric bass
- Alan Dawson – drums
- Eddie Jefferson – vocals (track 4)
