= Joseph "Flip" Nuñez =

American jazz pianist

Joseph "Flip" Nuñez (August 27, 1931 – November 3, 1995) was an American jazz pianist, composer, and vocalist of Filipino descent.

== Solo recording ==
- My Own Time and Space, (Catalyst), 1976

== Performance credits ==
- Beverly Kelly, Bev Kelly In Person, 1960
- Jon Hendricks, In Person at the Trident, 1963
- Azteca, Azteca, 1972
- Azteca, Pyramid of the Moon, 1973
- Ira Nepus, Trombone Feeling, 1979
- John Handy, Centerpiece, 1989
