= Last Train from Overbrook =

Studio album by James Moody
- Released: 1958
- Recorded: September 7, 8 & 10, 1958; Chicago
- Genre: Jazz
- Label: Argo; LP 637
- Producer: Dave Usher

James Moody chronology
Moody's Mood for Love (1956)	Last Train from Overbrook (1958)	James Moody (1959)

Last Train from Overbrook is an album by saxophonist James Moody recorded in 1958 and released on the Argo label. The album name and title track are a reference to Moody`s five month stay in Overbrook Asylum where he recuperated from alcoholism and mental health issues. The album was recorded shortly following his discharge.

== Reception ==
Professional ratings
Review scores
Source	Rating
Allmusic	4.5/5 stars

The Allmusic site awarded the album 4½ stars.

== Track listing ==
All compositions by James Moody, except as indicated

1. "Last Train from Overbrook" - 2:55
2. "Don't Worry 'Bout Me" (Rube Bloom, Ted Koehler) - 2:35
3. "Why Don't You?" (Johnny Pate) - 2:18
4. "What's New?" (Johnny Burke, Bob Haggart) - 3:22
5. "Tico-Tico" (Jose Abreu) - 1:37
6. "There She Goes" - 2:18
7. "All the Things You Are" (Oscar Hammerstein II, Jerome Kern) - 2:03
8. "Brother Yusef" (Pate) - 3:04
9. "Yvonne" (Pate) - 3:35
10. "The Moody One" [false start] (Pate) - 0:45
11. "The Moody One" (Pate) - 2:38

== Personnel ==
- James Moody - tenor saxophone, alto saxophone, flute
- Flip Ricard, Earl Turner, Sonny Cohn - trumpet
- Ethel Merker - French horn on "Last Train from Overbrook"
- John Avant - trombone
- Bill Atkins, Lenny Druss - alto saxophone
- Vito Price, Sandy Mosse, Eddie Johnson - tenor saxophone
- Pat Patrick - baritone saxophone
- Junior Mance - piano
- Floyd Morris - piano
- Johnny Pate - arranger, bass
- John Gray - guitar
- Red Holt - drums
