= Cy Touff =

American jazz musician

Cyril James Touff (March 4, 1927 in Chicago – January 24, 2003 in Evanston, Illinois) was an American jazz bass trumpeter. He was one of the few jazz musicians known as a bass trumpeter. He was also associated with West coast jazz although he spent most of his life in Chicago.

He started on piano aged six and played xylophone and saxophone before settling on trumpet. He served in the United States Army from 1944 to 1946, and in the military he played trombone. After the war, he switched to bass trumpet and worked with Woody Herman and Sandy Mosse. He joined Herman's band in 1953 and in 1954-55 played with a reduced version of the band that also included Richie Kamuca. He and Mosse led the Pieces of Eight octet in the late 1950s.

== Discography ==
- Cy Touff, His Octet & Quintet (Pacific Jazz, 1955)
- Doorway to Dixie (Argo, 1956)
- Touff Assignment (Argo, 1959)
