= Little Johnny C =

Studio album by Johnny Coles
- Released: Early March 1964
- Recorded: July 18 (#1–3) and August 9 (#4–6), 1963
- Studio: Van Gelder Studio, Englewood Cliffs, NJ
- Genre: Jazz
- Length: 40:29
- Label: Blue Note; BST 84144
- Producer: Alfred Lion

Johnny Coles chronology
The Warm Sound (1961)	Little Johnny C (1964)	Katumbo (Dance) (1971)

Little Johnny C is an album by American trumpeter Johnny Coles recorded in 1963 and released on the Blue Note label.

== Reception ==
The Allmusic review by Scott Yanow awarded the album 4½ stars and stated "The typically impressive Blue Note lineup handles the obscure material with creative invention".

Professional ratings
Review scores
Source	Rating
Allmusic	4.5/5 stars
The Penguin Guide to Jazz Recordings	3.5/4 stars

== Track listing ==
All compositions by Duke Pearson except as indicated

1. "Little Johnny C" – 5:12
2. "Hobo Joe" (Joe Henderson) – 8:15
3. "Jano" – 7:24
4. "My Secret Passion" – 7:11
5. "Heavy Legs" – 6:01
6. "So Sweet My Little Girl" – 6:26

== Personnel ==
- Johnny Coles – trumpet
- Leo Wright – alto saxophone, flute
- Joe Henderson – tenor saxophone
- Duke Pearson – piano
- Bob Cranshaw – bass
- Pete La Roca (tracks 4–6), Walter Perkins (tracks 1–3) – drums
