= Stomp Off Let's Go =

Studio album by Sonny Stitt
- Released: 1976
- Recorded: 1976
- Genre: Jazz
- Label: Flying Dutchman; BDL 1-1538
- Producer: Bob Thiele

Sonny Stitt chronology
Blues for Duke (1975)	Stomp Off Let's Go (1976)	Forecast: Sonny & Red (1976)

Stomp Off Let's Go is an album by American jazz saxophonist Sonny Stitt, featuring performances recorded in 1976 for the Flying Dutchman label.

== Reception ==
Professional ratings
Review scores
Source	Rating
AllMusic	3/5 stars

In his review for AllMusic, Scott Yanow stated, "this is an average although enjoyable Sonny Stitt bop date".

== Track listing ==
1. "Samba de Orpheo" (Luiz Bonfá, Antônio Maria) - 7:45
2. "Duke's Place" (Duke Ellington, Bob Thiele, Bill Katts, Ruth Roberts) - 8:54
3. "Perdido" (Juan Tizol, Ervin Drake, Hans Lengsfelder) - 11:52
4. "Little Suede Shoes" (Charlie Parker) - 7:50

== Personnel ==
- Sonny Stitt - tenor saxophone, alto saxophone
- Jon Faddis, Lew Soloff - trumpet
- Frank Owens - electric piano
- Bucky Pizzarelli - guitar
- Richard Davis - electric bass
- Louis Bellson - drums
- Leopoldo Fleming - percussion (tracks 1, 2 & 4)
