= My Way (Gene Ammons album) =

Studio album by Gene Ammons
- Released: 1971
- Recorded: July 26, 1971
- Studio: Van Gelder Studio, Englewood Cliffs, New Jersey
- Genre: Jazz
- Length: 34:18
- Label: Prestige; PR 10022
- Producer: Bob Porter

Gene Ammons chronology
| You Talk That Talk! (1971) | My Way (1971) | Chicago Concert (1971) |

Professional ratings
Review scores
| Source | Rating |
|---|---|
| Allmusic | 1.5/5 stars |
| The Rolling Stone Jazz Record Guide | 3/5 stars |

My Way is an album by saxophonist Gene Ammons recorded in 1971 and released on the Prestige label.

== Reception ==
Allmusic awarded the album 1½ stars with its review by Scott Yanow stating, "While Ammons sounds fine (his tone was never to be denied), the dated arrangements and unimaginative playing by the rhythm section (what is Roland Hanna doing on electric piano?) largely sink this effort".

== Track listing ==
1. "Chicago Breakdown" (William S. Fischer) – 9:35
2. "What's Going On" (Renaldo Benson, Al Cleveland, Marvin Gaye) – 4:18
3. "A House Is Not a Home" (Burt Bacharach, Hal David) – 3:40
4. "Sack Full of Dreams" (Gary McFarland, Louis Savary) – 6:25
5. "Back in Merida" – 4:20
6. "My Way" (Paul Anka, Claude François, Jacques Revaux) – 6:00
- Recorded at Van Gelder Studio in Englewood Cliffs, New Jersey on July 26, 1971

== Personnel ==
- Gene Ammons – tenor saxophone
- Robert Prado, Ernie Royal – trumpet (tracks 1, 2 & 4–6)
- Garnett Brown – trombone (tracks 1, 2 & 4–6)
- Richard Landry – tenor saxophone (tracks 1, 2 & 4–6)
- Babe Clark – baritone saxophone (tracks 1, 2 & 4–6)
- Roland Hanna – electric piano (tracks 1–3)
- Billy Butler (tracks 4–6), Ted Dunbar (tracks 1 & 2) – guitar
- Ron Carter – bass (tracks 4–6)
- Chuck Rainey – electric bass (tracks 1 & 2)
- Idris Muhammad – drums (tracks 1, 2 & 4–6)
- Omar Clay – percussion (tracks 1, 2, 4 & 5)
- Yvonne Fletcher, Patricia Hall, Loretta Ritter, Linda Wolfe – vocals (tracks 2 & 4)
- Unidentified string section (tracks 2, 4 & 6)
- Bill Fischer – arranger and conductor
