= My People (Soul People) =

Studio album by Freddie Roach
- Released: January 1968
- Recorded: June 22 & 29, 1967
- Studio: Van Gelder Studio, Englewood Cliffs, NJ
- Genre: Soul jazz
- Length: 30:50
- Label: Prestige; PRLP 7521
- Producer: Jerry Field

Freddie Roach chronology
Mocha Motion! (1967)	My People (Soul People) (1968)

My People (Soul People) is an album by American organist Freddie Roach released on Prestige in late 1967, his final one for the label. Roach plays here for the first time the flute and the piano, making use of overdubbing techniques. "Soul people come in all sizes, shapes and descriptions", Roach points out in the liner notes, "and it is to every soul brother that this album is dedicated."

The piece "Prince Street" refers to the road of the same name located in Newark, New Jersey, while "Freddie" is dedicated to Roach's son, Frederick Paul Roach II.

Professional ratings
Review scores
Source	Rating
Allmusic	2.5/5 stars

== Track listing ==
All compositions by Freddie Roach, unless otherwise noted

1. "Prince Street" - 3:49
2. "Straight Ahead" (Mal Waldron) - 2:55
3. "Mas que Nada" (Jorge Ben) - 4:18
4. "Drunk" - 4:37
5. "My People (Soul People)" - 3:14
6. "I'm on My Way" - 4:25
7. "Respectfully Yours" - 2:45
8. "Freddie" - 4:47

== Personnel ==
- Freddie Roach - organ, flute (#2, 6), vocals (#5), piano (#4)
- James Anderson - soprano sax
- Roland Alexander, Conrad Lester - tenor sax
- Harry White - flugelhorn
- Kiane Zawadi - euphonium, trombone
- Eddie Wright - guitar
- Eddie Gladden - drums
