= Flute 'n the Blues =

Studio album by James Moody
- Released: 1956
- Recorded: November 1, 1956; Chicago
- Genre: Jazz
- Label: Argo; LP 603
- Producer: Dave Usher

James Moody chronology
Wail, Moody, Wail (1955)	Flute 'n the Blues (1956)	Moody's Mood for Love (1956)

Flute 'n the Blues is an album by saxophonist James Moody recorded in 1956 and released on the Argo label. The album was Moody's first recording featuring him on flute.

== Reception ==
Professional ratings
Review scores
Source	Rating
Allmusic	4/5 stars

Scott Yanow, writing for AllMusic, stated: "The basic material (mostly standards and blues) are given spirited and swinging treatment by the underrated group".

== Track listing ==
1. "Flute 'n the Blues" (Harold Newboldt, James Moody, Arthur Boyd) – 4:06
2. "Birdland Story" (Eddie Jefferson, Moody) – 2:29
3. "It Could Happen to You" (Jimmy Van Heusen, Johnny Burke) – 2:40
4. "I Cover the Waterfront" (Edward Heyman, Johnny Green) – 2:40
5. "Body and Soul" (Heyman, Green, Robert Sour, Frank Eyton) – 4:23
6. "Breaking the Blues" (John Adriano Acea) – 4:07
7. "Parker's Mood" (Charlie Parker) – 3:20
8. "Easy Living" (Leo Robin, Ralph Rainger) – 3:52
9. "Boo's Tune" (Florence Pleasant) – 3:42
10. "Richard's Blues" (Moody, Newboldt) – 4:37

== Personnel ==
- James Moody – tenor saxophone, alto saxophone, flute
- Johnny Coles – trumpet – featured on track 8
- William Shepherd – trombone – featured on track 3
- Pee Wee Moore – baritone saxophone
- Jimmy Boyd – piano, peck horn
- John Latham – bass
- Clarence Johnston – drums
- Eddie Jefferson – vocals (tracks 2, 4 & 7)
