= Pee Wee Moore =

American jazz musician (1928–2009)

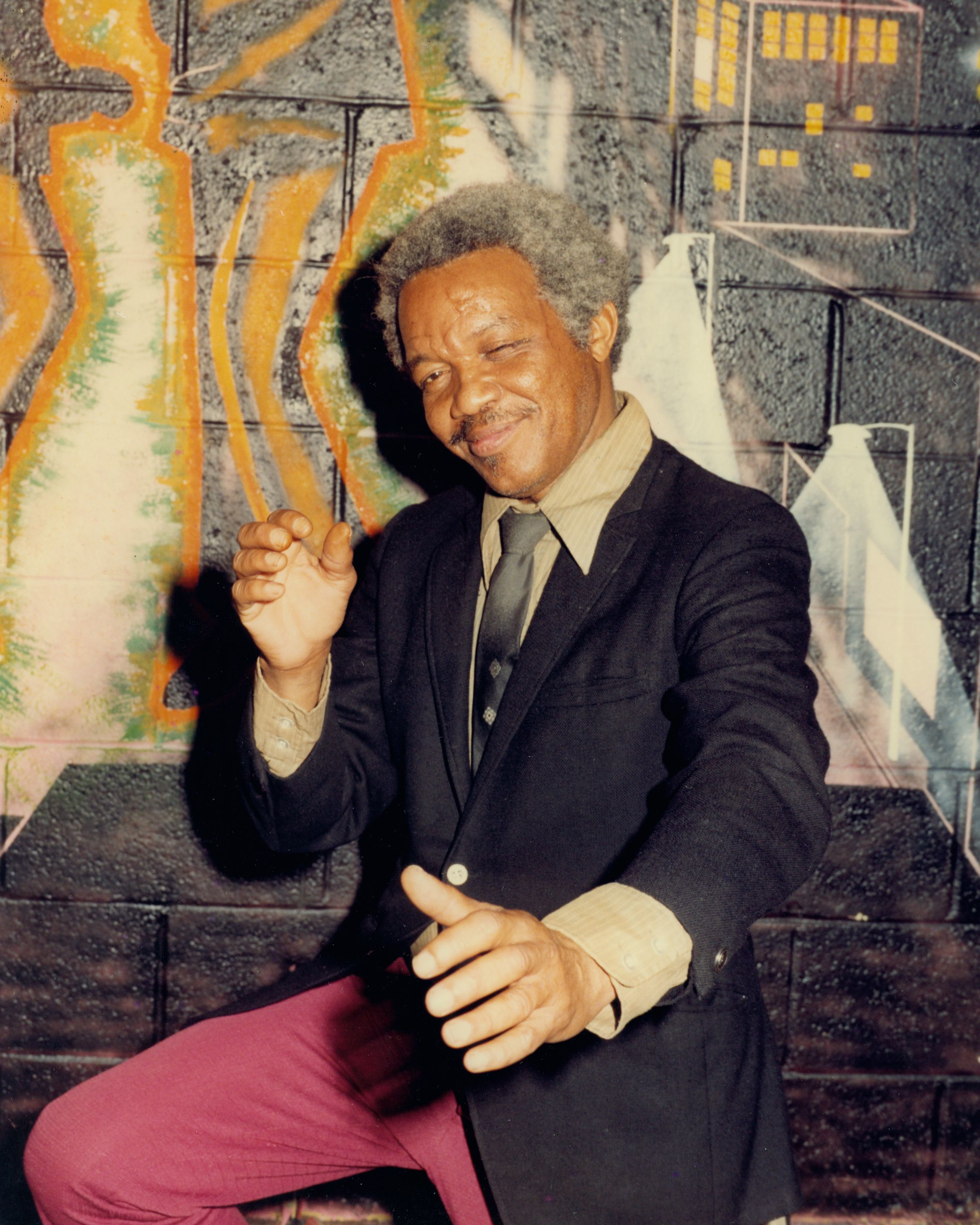
Pee Wee Moore in the Seventies

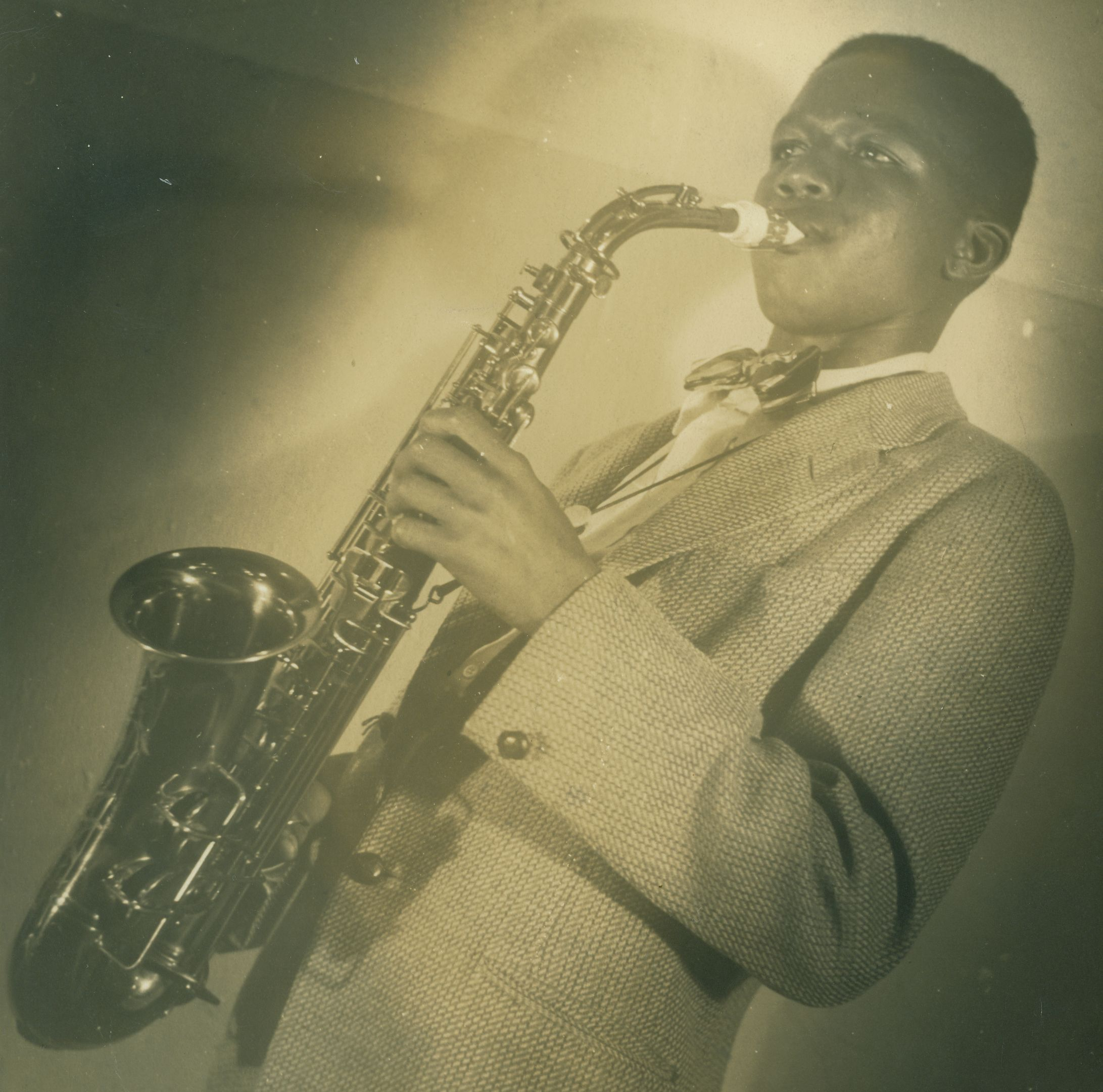
Pee Wee Moore as a young man

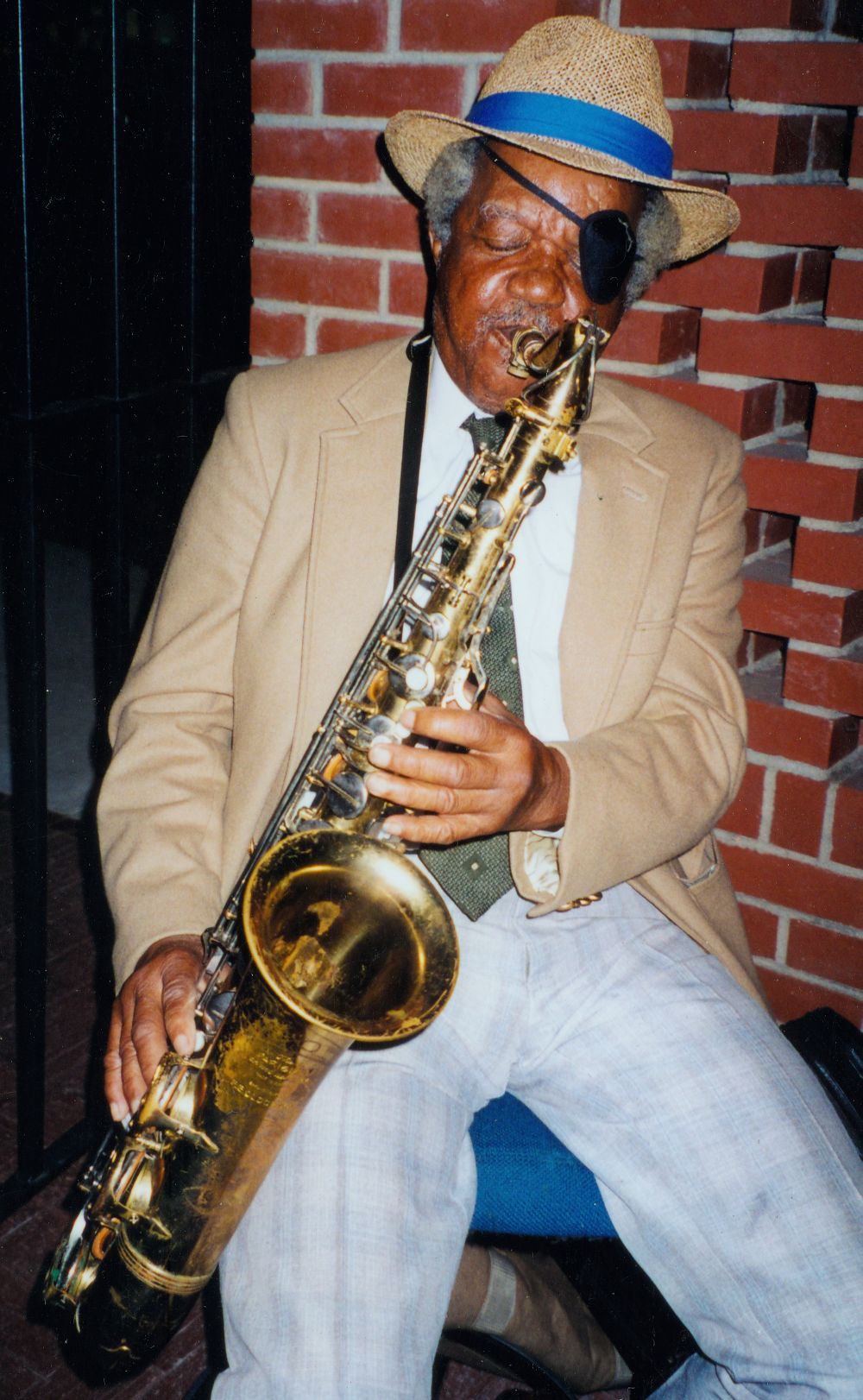
Pee Wee Moore in 2008

Numa Smith "Pee Wee" Moore (March 5, 1928 – April 13, 2009) was an American jazz saxophonist.

== Early life and education ==
Moore was born in Raleigh, North Carolina and attended Washington High School in Raleigh and the Hampton Institute in Virginia, where he switched his major from pre-med to music after one semester. He joined the Royal Hamptonians and toured on a USO circuit. While traveling back to Hampton from New York, Pee Wee, while asleep in the backseat of his friend's car, lost his left eye in an accident.

== Musical career ==
Moore played with Lucky Millinder and Louis Jordan in 1951, and played with R&B musicians such as Wynonie Harris early in the decade. He worked with Illinois Jacquet in 1952 and James Moody in 1954–56, then played with Dizzy Gillespie in 1957, recording with him on several albums for Verve Records. He also worked with Mary Lou Williams in 1957 and Bill Doggett in 1965.

Moore moved from New York back to Raleigh in the 1970s to care for his mother and recover from alcohol addiction. There, he earned a living as a handyman while playing regularly at a variety of venues in the Raleigh-Durham area.

Moore died of pancreatic cancer in Raleigh at the age of 81.

== Discography ==
With Dizzy Gillespie

- Dizzy Gillespie at Newport (Verve, 1957)
- The Greatest Trumpet of Them All (Verve, 1957)

With James Moody

- Moodsville (EmArcy, 1952)
- Moody (Prestige, 1954) also released as Moody's Workshop
- James Moody's Moods (Prestige, 1954–55)
- Hi Fi Party (Prestige, 1955)
- Wail, Moody, Wail (Prestige, 1955)
- Flute 'n the Blues (Argo, 1956)
- Moody's Mood for Love (Argo, 1956)
