= Musa Kaleem =

American jazz musician

- Born: Orlando Wright; January 3, 1921; Wheeling, West Virginia, U.S.
- Died: March 26, 1988 (aged 67) Los Angeles, California, U.S.
- Genres: Jazz
- Instruments: Flute, saxophone

Orlando Wright, better known as Musa Kaleem (January 3, 1921 – March 26, 1988) was an American jazz saxophonist and flautist.

== Career ==
Wright bought a clarinet in 1937, and by 1939 was touring as a saxophonist with the El Rodgers Mystics of Rhythm, featuring Eddie Jefferson on lead vocals. Early in the 1940s, he began using the name Gonga Musa, and then Musa Kaleem, the name by which he is best known. He played in Pittsburgh often in the 1940s, gigging with Erroll Garner, Mary Lou Williams, and Art Blakey.

In the middle of the decade he toured with Fletcher Henderson, then relocated to New York City and played with Duke Ellington, Count Basie, Jimmie Lunceford, and the Savoy Sultans in the late 1940s. In the 1950s, Kaleem was a seaman. Upon his return in the 1960s, he played with James Moody.

== Discography ==
- Tiny Grimes & Coleman Hawkins, Blues Groove (Esquire, 1958)
- Eddie Jefferson, The Jazz Singer (Inner City, 1976)
- James Moody, James Moody (Argo, 1959)
- James Moody, Cookin' the Blues (Argo, 1965)
- Dizzy Reece, Comin' On! (Blue Note, 1960, reissued on CD in 1999)
