= Down to Earth (Freddie Roach album) =

Studio album by Freddie Roach
- Released: 1962
- Recorded: August 23, 1962
- Studio: Van Gelder Studio, Englewood Cliffs, NJ
- Genre: Jazz
- Length: 38:57
- Label: Blue Note; BST 84113
- Producer: Alfred Lion

Freddie Roach chronology
Down to Earth (1962)	Mo' Greens Please (1963)

Down to Earth is the debut album by American organist Freddie Roach recorded in 1962 and released on the Blue Note label.

== Reception ==
Professional ratings
Review scores
Source	Rating
Allmusic	4.5/5 stars

The Allmusic review by Stephen Thomas Erlewine awarded the album 4½ stars and stated "Freddie Roach differentiated himself from the legions of soul-jazz organists on his debut album, Down to Earth. Many jazz organists played the instrument down and dirty, and while there's funk in Roach's playing, his style is ultimately lighter than many of his peers, with clean, concise solos and chords... the signature of Down to Earth is Roach's tasteful bluesy grooves, which prove to be just as entertaining as the hotter styles of his Blue Note peers Jimmy Smith and John Patton".

== Track listing ==
All compositions by Freddie Roach except where noted

1. "De Bug" - 6:46
2. "Ahm Miz" - 5:53
3. "Lujon" (Henry Mancini) - 6:33
4. "Althea Soon" - 8:11
5. "More Mileage" - 6:39
6. "Lion Down" - 4:55

== Personnel ==
- Freddie Roach - organ
- Percy France - tenor saxophone
- Kenny Burrell - guitar
- Clarence Johnston - drums
