= James Moody's Moods =

Studio album by James Moody
- Released: 1956
- Recorded: September 29, 1954, January 28, August 24 and December 12, 1955
- Studio: Van Gelder Studio, Hackensack, New Jersey
- Genre: Jazz
- Label: Prestige; PRLP 7056
- Producer: Bob Weinstock

James Moody chronology
Moody (1954–55)	James Moody's Moods (1956)	Hi Fi Party (1955)

Professional ratings
Review scores
Source	Rating
AllMusic	3/5 stars

James Moody's Moods is an album by saxophonist James Moody composed of sessions recorded in 1954 and 1955, released on the Prestige label.

== Track listing ==
1. "The Strut" (Benny Golson) – 4:02
2. "Jammin' with James" (Dave Burns, James Moody) – 11:36
3. "A Sinner Kissed an Angel" (Mack David, Larry Shayne) – 4:02
4. "It Might as Well Be Spring" - (alto sax take) (Oscar Hammerstein II, Richard Rodgers) – 3:46
5. "I've Got the Blues" (Eddie Jefferson) – 2:45
6. "Blue Walk" (Benny Golson) – 3:13
7. "Faster James" (Quincy Jones) – 3:40
- Recorded at Van Gelder Studio in Hackensack, New Jersey on September 29, 1954 (track 4), January 28, 1955 (tracks 5–7), August 24, 1955 (track 2) and December 12, 1955 (tracks 1 & 3)

== Personnel ==
- James Moody – tenor saxophone, alto saxophone
- Dave Burns – trumpet
- William Shepherd – trombone
- Pee Wee Moore – baritone saxophone
- Jimmy Boyd – piano
- John Latham – bass
- Clarence Johnston – drums
- Eddie Jefferson – vocal (track 5)
- Bob Weinstock – supervisor
- Rudy Van Gelder – engineer
