= Hi Fi Party =

Studio album by James Moody
- Released: 1956
- Recorded: August 23 & 24, 1955; Van Gelder Studio, Hackensack, New Jersey
- Genre: Jazz
- Length: 46:49
- Label: Prestige; PRLP 7011
- Producer: Bob Weinstock

James Moody chronology
James Moody's Moods (1955)	Hi Fi Party (1956)	Wail, Moody, Wail (1955)

Hi Fi Party is an album by saxophonist James Moody recorded in 1955 and released on the Prestige label. The CD reissue added a bonus track which originally appeared on James Moody's Moods.

== Reception ==
Professional ratings
Review scores
Source	Rating
Allmusic	4.5/5 stars
The Penguin Guide to Jazz Recordings	3.5/4 stars

Scott Yanow, in a review for AllMusic, stated: "For a period in the mid-'50s, tenor saxophonist James Moody (who doubled on alto) was able to keep together a swinging septet that played bop in a fairly accessible way".

== Track listing ==
1. "There Will Never Be Another You" (Mack Gordon, Harry Warren) - 3:49
2. "Hard to Get" (Jack Segal) - 4:03
3. "Disappointed" (Eddie Jefferson) - 6:19
4. "Big Ben" (Benny Golson) - 4:16
5. "Show Eyes" (John Adriano Acea) - 4:22
6. "Little John" (John Latham) - 4:20
7. "And You Called My Name" (Golson) - 4:10
8. "Little Ricky" (Acea) - 3:54
9. "Jammin' with James" (Dave Burns, James Moody) - 11:36 Bonus track on CD reissue

== Personnel ==
- James Moody - tenor saxophone, alto saxophone
- Dave Burns - trumpet
- William Shepherd - trombone
- Pee Wee Moore - baritone saxophone
- Jimmy Boyd - piano
- John Latham - bass
- Clarence Johnston - drums
- Eddie Jefferson - vocal (out chorus track 3)

=== Production ===
- Bob Weinstock - supervisor
- Rudy Van Gelder - engineer
