= Catalyst Records =

US record company and label

- Founded: 1975
- Defunct: 1977
- Status: Defunct
- Genre: Jazz
- Country of origin: U.S.
- Location: Los Angeles

Catalyst Records was a record company and label specializing in jazz. It was formed in Los Angeles in 1975. Catalyst released both new recordings and reissues. The catalogue was available through the 1980s, though recording ceased in 1977. This label should not be confused with the Bertelsmann Music Group (BMG) subsidiary which was founded in the early 1990s.

Catalyst released new albums by Gary Bartz, Hadley Caliman, Frank Foster, Terumasa Hino, Ahmad Jamal, Irene Kral, Sam Most, Sonny Stitt, and Frank Strazzeri. It reissued albums by Paul Gonsalves, Charlie Mariano, and Michał Urbaniak.

== Discography ==
=== 7601–7628 ===
- CAT–7601: Ron Jefferson – Vous Ete's Swing (1976)
- CAT–7602: George Muribus – Brazilian Tapestry (1976)
- CAT–7603: Flip Nuñez – My Own Time and Space (1976)
- CAT–7604: Hadley Caliman – Projecting (1976)
- CAT–7605: Jim Gannon – Gannon's Back in Town (1976)
- CAT–7606: Ahmad Jamal – Recorded Live at Oil Can Harry's (1976)
- CAT–7607: Frank Strazzeri – After the Rain (1976)
- CAT–7608: Sonny Stitt with Red Holloway – Forecast: Sonny & Red (1976)
- CAT–7609: Sam Most – But Beautiful (1976)
- CAT–7610: Gary Bartz – Ju Ju Man (1976)
- CAT–7611: Billy Mitchell – Now's the Time (1976)
- CAT–7612: Pat Britt – Starrsong (1975)
- CAT–7613: Frank Foster – Here and Now (1976)
- CAT–7614: Mark Levine – Up 'Til Now (1977)
- CAT–7615: Michael Howell – Alone (1977)
- CAT–7616: Sonny Stitt – I Remember Bird (1977)
- CAT–7617: Don Menza – First Flight (1977)
- CAT–7618: Henry Franklin – Tribal Dance (1977)
- CAT–7619: George Muribus – Trio '77 (1977)
- CAT–7620: Sonny Stitt – Sonny Stitt with Strings: A Tribute to Duke Ellington (1977)
- CAT–7621: Jimmy Stewart – Fire Flower
- CAT–7622: Earl Hines – Jazz is His Old Lady and My Old Man
- CAT–7623: Frank Strazzeri – Straz (1977)
- CAT–7624: Hadley Caliman – Celebration
- CAT–7625: Irene Kral – Kral Space (1977)
- CAT 7626: Baroque Jazz Ensemble – The Baroque Jazz Ensemble featuring Ira Schulman (1977)
- CAT–7627: Albert Dailey – Renaissance (1977)
- CAT–7628: Junior Cook – Pressure Cooker (1977)

=== 7901 ===
- CAT–7901: Terumasa Hino – Fuji
- CAT–7902: Art Blakey – Jazz Messengers '70
- CAT–7903: Helen Merrill & Teddy Wilson – Helen Sings, Teddy Swings
- CAT–7904: Carmen McRae – As Time Goes By Alone Live at the Dug
- CAT–7905: George Lewis – And His New Orleans Jazz All–Stars
- CAT–7906: Mal Waldron & Gary Peacock – First Encounter
- CAT–7907: Martha Miyake – My Heart Belongs to Teddy
- CAT–7908: Jorge Lopez Ruiz – Amor Buenos Aires (1977)
- CAT–7909: Michał Urbaniak – The Beginning (1976)
- CAT–7910: Terumasa Hino – At Berlin Jazz Festival (1971)
- CAT–7911: Sadao Watanabe & Charlie Mariano – Nabesada and Charlie
- CAT–7912: Helen Merrill – Autumn Love (1977)
- CAT–7913: Paul Gonsalves – With Willie Cook & Enrique Villegas: The Buenos Aires Session (1977)
- CAT–7914: Alberto Favero – Suite Trane (In Memoriam John Coltrane)
- CAT–7915: Charlie Mariano – Reflections (1977)
- CAT–7916: Masabumi Kikuchi – Matrix (1977)
- CAT–7917: Chivo Borraro – Buenos Aires Blues (1977)
