= All That's Good =

1965 studio album by Freddie Roach

Studio album by Freddie Roach
- Released: October 1965
- Recorded: October 16, 1964
- Studio: Van Gelder Studio, Englewood Cliffs, NJ
- Genre: Jazz
- Length: 38:55
- Label: Blue Note; BST 84190
- Producer: Alfred Lion

Freddie Roach chronology
Brown Sugar (1964)	All That's Good (1965)	The Freddie Roach Soul Book (1966)

All That's Good is the fifth album by American organist Freddie Roach recorded in 1964 and released on the Blue Note label. It was reissued on CD only in Japan, as a limited edition.

== Reception ==
Professional ratings
Review scores
Source	Rating
Allmusic	2/5 stars

The Allmusic review by Stephen Thomas Erlewine awarded the album 2 stars and stated "On his final album for Blue Note, Freddie Roach decided to step outside -- way outside -- the tasteful soul-jazz that had become his trademark. Roach decided to make a concept album, one that captured the sound and vibe of what he calls "Soultown," or what critics like to call "black culture." .... Roach never hits upon a groove, choosing to create a series of bizarre, hazy textures. That atmosphere is catapulted into the realms of the surreal by vocalists Phyllis Smith, Willie Tate, and Marvin Robinson, whose wordless, floating singing sounds spectral; the intent may have been to mimic a gospel choir, but the effect is that of a pack of banshees wailing in the background....in a weird way, it's almost fortunate that Roach attempted something grand, because All That's Good sounds like no other Blue Note record of the early '60s".

== Track listing ==
All compositions by Freddie Roach except as noted

1. "Journeyman" - 7:38
2. "All That's Good" - 6:23
3. "Blues for 007" - 5:51
4. "Busted" (Harlan Howard) - 6:04
5. "Cloud 788" - 6:25
6. "Loie" (Kenny Burrell) - 6:34

== Personnel ==
- Freddie Roach - organ
- Conrad Lester - tenor saxophone
- Calvin Newborn - guitar
- Clarence Johnston - drums
- Marvin Robinson, Phyllis Smith, Willie Tate - vocals
