= Talib Dawud =

American jazz musician

Talib Ahmad Dawood (formerly Alfonso Nelson Rainey, born January 26, 1923, on Antigua; died 9 July 1999, New York City) was an American jazz trumpeter.

== Career ==
Dawud came from Antigua and Barbuda, taking lessons from his father, a trumpeter who played in marching bands; his mother was a singer who accompanied herself on piano. Dawud also learned banjo and pipe organ. He had his further education in the United States at a high school and music school he experienced in the United States, came as the end of the 1930s to New York. Because of the support of the Barrymore Foundation, he first took the stage name Barrymore Rainey. After studying at the Juilliard School in 1940, he played with Tiny Bradshaw, Louis Armstrong, Benny Carter, Andy Kirk, Jimmie Lunceford, Roy Eldridge with further swing orchestras. In Philadelphia he met Sheikh Nasir Ahmad, an Ahmadiyya missionary, through whom he converted to Islam and took the name Talib Dawud. In the second half of the 1940s and again in 1956 he was a member of the Dizzy Gillespie Big Band, performing with in 1957 at the Newport Jazz Festival.

In 1954 he married Sayida Fazl of Cleveland, Ohio, his second marriage. They bore a daughter Rafiqa and his second son Idris after having a son Farouq by his first marriage.

In 1958 he then married the singer Dakota Staton. He was no longer working as an active musician since 1959 and operated an Africa-Import Shop in New York City. As a member of the Ahmadiyya Muslim Community, which distanced itself from the Nation of Islam, he wrote numerous articles in the African-American Chicago daily New Crusader on the controversy between Elijah Muhammad and Malcolm X.

In his later years he took up the study of martial arts in his native country Antigua, and became a multi degree black belt in three disciplines and sensei.
