= Cookin' the Blues =

Live album by James Moody
- Released: 1964
- Recorded: June 1961
- Venue: The Jazz Workshop, San Francisco
- Genre: Jazz
- Label: Argo; LP 756
- Producer: Jack Tracy

James Moody chronology
Moody with Strings (1961)	Cookin' the Blues (1964)	Another Bag (1962)

Cookin' the Blues is a live album by saxophonist James Moody recorded in San Francisco in 1961 and released on the Argo label in 1964.

== Reception ==
Professional ratings
Review scores
Source	Rating
Allmusic	4/5 stars

The Allmusic site awarded the album 4 stars.

== Track listing ==
All compositions by James Moody, except as indicated

1. "The Jazz Twist" – 6:36
2. "One For Nat" (Gene Kee) – 5:52
3. "Bunny Boo" – 5:30
4. "Moody Flooty" – 4:12
5. "It Might as Well Be Spring" (Richard Rodgers, Oscar Hammerstein II) – 5:45
6. "Disappointed" (Eddie Jefferson) – 2:06
7. "Sister Sadie" (Horace Silver) – 2:42
8. "Little Buck" – 3:15
9. "Home Fries" (Kee) – 6:12

== Personnel ==
- James Moody – alto saxophone, tenor saxophone, flute
- Howard McGhee – trumpet
- Bernard McKinney – trombone
- Musa Kaleem – baritone saxophone
- Sonny Donaldson – piano
- Steve Davis – bass
- Arnold Enlow – drums
- Eddie Jefferson – vocals – (tracks 6 & 7)
