= Brown Sugar (Freddie Roach album) =

Studio album by Freddie Roach
- Released: 1964
- Recorded: March 19, 1964
- Studio: Van Gelder Studio, Englewood Cliffs, NJ
- Genre: Jazz
- Length: 37:05
- Label: Blue Note; BST 84168
- Producer: Alfred Lion

Freddie Roach chronology
| Good Move! (1963) | Brown Sugar (1964) | All That's Good (1964) |

Brown Sugar is the fourth album by American organist Freddie Roach recorded in 1964 and released on the Blue Note label.

== Reception ==
Professional ratings
Review scores
| Source | Rating |
|---|---|
| Allmusic | 4.5/5 stars |

The Allmusic review by Stephen Thomas Erlewine awarded the album 4½ stars and stated "Brown Sugar marks a turning point for Freddie Roach: It's the moment he decided to get dirty, funky, and soulful. Previously, he had plenty of funk in his playing, but he was tasteful, at times a little bit too tasteful. On Brown Sugar, he simply burns".

== Track listing ==
All compositions by Freddie Roach except as noted

1. "Brown Sugar" - 4:22
2. "The Right Time" (Jerry Herman) - 7:18
3. "Have You Ever Had the Blues" (Harold Logan, Lloyd Price) - 6:43
4. "The Midnight Sun Will Never Set" (Dorcas Cochran, Quincy Jones, Henri Salvador) - 6:55
5. "Next Time You See Me" (Earl Forest, William G. Harvey) - 5:07
6. "All Night Long" (Curtis Reginald Lewis) - 6:40

== Personnel ==
- Freddie Roach - organ
- Joe Henderson - tenor saxophone
- Eddie Wright - guitar
- Clarence Johnston - drums
