= Ben Kynard =

American jazz saxophonist (1920–2012)

Background information
- Born: February 28, 1920; Eureka Springs, Arkansas
- Died: July 5, 2012 (aged 92) Kansas City
- Genres: Jazz
- Instrument: saxophone

Ben Kynard (February 28, 1920 – July 5, 2012) was an American jazz saxophonist (alto and baritone). He was known through his collaboration with Lionel Hampton, as a composer and arranger.

== Early life ==
Ben D. Kynard was born on February 28, 1920, in Eureka Springs, Arkansas. He learned how to play saxophone from his brother. He graduated in 1938 from Sumner High School in Kansas City, Kansas.

== Career ==
Kynard appeared in nightclubs as a youth.

After completing military service in the U. S. Army, he played from 1946 to 1953 in the Lionel Hampton orchestra, for which he arranged, and in 1946 composed the title "Red Top". Hampton recorded the song for Decca in 1947 and was soon covered by Gene Ammons. However, Kynard did not get enough royalties. "Red Top" was later also recorded by musicians such as David Allen, Anthony Braxton, Dexter Gordon, Louis Jordan, Erroll Garner, Slide Hampton, Woody Herman and His Orchestra, King Pleasure / Betty Carter, and Eddie Vinson.

After Kynard had left the Hampton band, he worked for 32 years at the United States Postal Service in Kansas City; he also played jazz in night clubs and wrote compositions for local musicians. Kynard worked from 1945 to 1984 at 51 recording sessions, with Willis Jackson, Sonny Parker, Joe Thomas and in 1948 Billie Holiday (I Cover the Waterfront).

== Personal life ==
Ben Kynard was an uncle of the organist Charles Kynard.

He died on July 5, 2012, in Kansas City.
