= Hey! It's James Moody =

Studio album by James Moody
- Released: 1960
- Recorded: December 29, 1959; Ter-Mar Recording Studios, Chicago
- Genre: Jazz
- Label: Argo; LP 666
- Producer: Jack Tracy

James Moody chronology
James Moody (1959)	Hey! It's James Moody (1960)	Moody with Strings (1961)

Hey! It's James Moody is an album by saxophonist James Moody recorded in 1959 and released on the Argo label.

== Reception ==
Professional ratings
Review scores
Source	Rating
Allmusic	3.5/5 stars
The Penguin Guide to Jazz Recordings	3/4 stars

The Allmusic site awarded the album 3½ stars.

== Track listing ==
All compositions by James Moody, except as indicated

1. "Stella by Starlight" (Victor Young, Ned Washington) – 3:06
2. "Indian Summer" (Al Dubin, Victor Herbert) – 2:36
3. "Don't Blame Me" (Dorothy Fields, Jimmy McHugh) – 4:29
4. "Last Train from Overbrook" – 2:36
5. "Please Say Yes" (Tom McIntosh) – 3:59
6. "Blue Jubilee" (McIntosh) – 6:16
7. "Woody N' You" (Dizzy Gillespie) – 3:12
8. "Trouble in de Lowlands" – 2:27
9. "Summertime" (George Gershwin, DuBose Heyward) – 2:30
10. "Tali" (McIntosh) – 2:49

== Personnel ==
- James Moody – tenor saxophone, flute
- Johnny Gray – guitar
- Eldee Young – bass
- Clarence Johnston – drums
- Eddie Jefferson – vocals – (tracks 4 & 9)
