= Parker's Mood =

1948 jazz composition by Charlie Parker

Single by Charlie Parker All Stars
- A-side: "Barbados"
- Released: October 1948
- Recorded: September 18, 1948
- Studio: Harry Smith Studios, New York City
- Genre: Blues
- Length: 3:01
- Label: Savoy
- Composer: Charlie Parker
- Producer: Teddy Reig

"Parker's Mood" is a piece of music originally performed by Charlie Parker as an improvised blues in 1948. Vocalese lyrics were later written and recorded by King Pleasure and Eddie Jefferson.

== Original recording ==
Alto saxophonist Charlie Parker recorded "Parker's Mood" in New York City on September 18, 1948. The other musicians for the Savoy Records session were pianist John Lewis, bassist Curley Russell, and drummer Max Roach. There were five takes: two false starts and three complete takes. The complete takes were improvised spontaneously, with the probable exception of the opening two bars, which are the same on each take. Parker "varies the phrasing and motivic relatedness of the opening melodic idea in each take". The tempo across the takes varies from 65 quarter notes to 87.

"Parker's Mood" is a B♭ blues. "The introduction begins on G minor [...] The feature then proceeds to C minor, which [...] suggests i–iv in G minor (or v–i in C minor)." Then, from the third bar, "the rhythm section begin a four-bar chord progression that establishes B♭ major through a tritone substitution of each chord of a vi–ii–V progression with major-seventh chords as the vi substitute (D♭M7) and the ii substitute (G♭M7)".

The piece was copyrighted on November 15, 1948.

== Vocalese versions ==
Vocalese lyrics were added in 1953 by King Pleasure. Lewis appeared on piano in Pleasure's recording of it for Prestige Records, which was released around 1954. Separately, Eddie Jefferson wrote vocalese lyrics. Jefferson's version was retitled as "Bless My Soul" and recorded in 1962 for his album Letter from Home.

== Reception and legacy ==
Jazz historian Ted Gioia described Parker's performance of "Parker's Mood" as a "bittersweet lament [that is] as deep a statement of the blues as exists in the jazz tradition". Jazz writer and musician Brian Priestley categorised the piece as a "slow blues masterpiece". By late 2018, there had been at least 90 recordings of Parker's piece.
