= Moody (James Moody album) =

Studio album by James Moody
- Released: 1956
- Recorded: January 8, April 12 and September 29, 1954
- Studio: Van Gelder Studio, Hackensack, New Jersey
- Genre: Jazz
- Label: Prestige; PRLP 7072

James Moody chronology
New Sounds (1952)	Moody (1956)	James Moody's Moods (1954–55)

Moody (also released as Moody's Workshop) is an album by saxophonist James Moody composed of sessions from 1954 with a septet arranged by Quincy Jones. The LP was released on the Prestige label.

== Reception ==
Professional ratings
Review scores
Source	Rating
AllMusic	4.5/5 stars

Scott Yanow, writing for AllMusic, stated: "In the mid-'50s James Moody led a four-horn septet that played music falling somewhere between bop and rhythm & blues. The danceable rhythms and riffing made its recordings somewhat accessible but the solos of Moody (on tenor and alto) and trumpeter Dave Burns also held listener's interests".

== Track listing ==
All compositions by Quincy Jones, except where indicated.

1. "Keepin' Up with Jonesy" – 3:14
2. "Workshop" (Gil Fuller) – 3:08
3. "NJR (I'm Gone)" – 3:19
4. "A Hundred Years from Today" (Ned Washington, Joe Young, Victor Young) – 2:45
5. "Jack Raggs" (Jack Raggs) – 2:40
6. "Mambo with Moody" (James Moody, Newbolt) – 4:07
7. "Over the Rainbow" (Harold Arlen, Yip Harburg) – 3:03
8. "Blues in the Closet" (Oscar Pettiford) – 3:53
9. "Moody's Mood for Blues" – 5:35
10. "Nobody Knows the Trouble I've Seen" (Traditional) – 2:51
11. "It Might as Well Be Spring" - (tenor sax take) (Oscar Hammerstein II, Richard Rodgers) – 3:51
- Recorded at Van Gelder Studio in Hackensack, New Jersey on January 8, 1954 (tracks 1–4), April 12, 1954 (tracks 5–7), September 29, 1954 (tracks 8, 9 & 11) and January 28, 1955 (track 10)

== Personnel ==
- James Moody – tenor saxophone, alto saxophone
- Dave Burns – trumpet
- William Shepherd – trombone
- Pee Wee Moore – baritone saxophone
- Sadik Hakim (tracks 1–4), Jimmy Boyd (tracks 5–11) – piano
- John Latham – bass
- Joe Harris (tracks 1–7), Clarence Johnston (tracks 8–11) – drums
- Quincy Jones – arranger
- Eddie Jefferson – vocal (track 2)
- Rudy Van Gelder – engineer
