= James Moody (album) =

Studio album by James Moody
- Released: 1959
- Recorded: August 1959; Chicago
- Genre: Jazz
- Length: 37:53
- Label: Argo; LP 648
- Producer: Jack Tracy

James Moody chronology
Last Train from Overbrook (1958)	James Moody (1959)	Hey! It's James Moody (1960)

James Moody is a self-titled album by saxophonist James Moody recorded in 1959 and released on the Argo label.

== Reception ==
Professional ratings
Review scores
Source	Rating
Allmusic	4/5 stars

Tim Sendra of Allmusic reviewed the album stating: "This record is a fine example of what makes Moody so wonderful; his exuberance, thoughtfulness, and soul make him one of the greats. If you haven't discovered him yet, this is a good place to start. If you're already hip to the man, this is a vital addition to your collection".

== Track listing ==
All compositions by James Moody, except as indicated

1. "Darben the Redd Foxx" - 3:53
2. "Little Girl Blue" (Lorenz Hart, Richard Rodgers) - 3:11
3. "Casbah" Tadd Dameron - mis titled as Out of Nowhere (Johnny Green, Edward Heyman) - 6:31
4. "Daahoud" (Clifford Brown) - 6:00
5. "Yesterdays" (Otto Harbach, Jerome Kern) - 4:05
6. "Cookie" (Gene Kee) - 2:41
7. "With Malice Toward None" (Tom McIntosh) - 3:21
8. "R.B.Q." (Gene Kee) - 8:11

== Personnel ==
- James Moody - alto saxophone (track 3) tenor saxophone, (tracks 4,6 and 8) and flute (1,2,5 and 7)
- Johnny Coles - trumpet
- Tom McIntosh - trombone
- Musa Kaliem - baritone saxophone
- Gene Kee - piano
- John Latham - bass
- Clarence Johnston - drums
