= Sonny Stitt with Strings: A Tribute to Duke Ellington =

Studio album by Sonny Stitt
- Released: 1977
- Recorded: 1977
- Studio: Annex Recording Studios, Hollywood, CA
- Genre: Jazz
- Label: Catalyst; CAT-7620
- Producer: Pat Britt

Sonny Stitt chronology
I Remember Bird (1977)	Sonny Stitt with Strings: A Tribute to Duke Ellington (1977)	The Sonny Stitt Quintet (1978)

Sonny Stitt with Strings: A Tribute to Duke Ellington is an album by American jazz saxophonist Sonny Stitt featuring performances of compositions associated with Duke Ellington recorded in 1977 for the Catalyst label.

== Reception ==
Professional ratings
Review scores
Source	Rating
Allmusic	3/5 stars

The Allmusic site awarded the album 3 stars, stating, "No real surprises occur although the string charts are a cut above the usual. Stitt is at his most melodic and really romps on a few of these pieces".

== Track listing ==
1. "Take the "A" Train" (Billy Strayhorn) - 3:44
2. "Prelude to a Kiss" (Duke Ellington, Irving Gordon, Irving Mills) - 4:17
3. "It Don't Mean a Thing (If It Ain't Got That Swing)" (Ellington, Mills) - 4:35
4. "Cotton Tail" (Ellington) - 5:14
5. "In a Sentimental Mood" (Ellington, Mills, Manny Kurtz) - 4:09
6. "In a Mellow Tone" (Ellington, Milt Gabler) - 4:43
7. "Jeep's Blues" (Ellington, Johnny Hodges) - 5:43

== Personnel ==
- Sonny Stitt - tenor saxophone, alto saxophone
- Gildo Mahones - piano
- Allen Jackson - bass
- Clarence Johnston - drums
- String section arranged and conducted by Bill Finegan
