= Moody's Mood for Love (album) =

Studio album by James Moody
- Released: 1957
- Recorded: December 14, 1956, and January 13, 1957; Chicago
- Genre: Jazz
- Length: 30:58
- Label: Argo; LP 613
- Producer: Phil Chess

James Moody chronology
| Flute 'n the Blues (1955) | Moody's Mood for Love (1957) | Last Train from Overbrook (1958) |

Moody's Mood for Love is an album by saxophonist James Moody recorded in 1956 and released on the Argo label.

== Reception ==
Professional ratings
Review scores
| Source | Rating |
|---|---|
| Allmusic | 4/5 stars |

Ron Wynn of Allmusic reviewed the album and observed it contains "A strong version of the "Moody's Mood for Love," with a vocal by the late Eddie Jefferson".

== Track listing ==
All compositions by James Moody, except as indicated

1. "Foolin' the Blues" – 5:05
2. "Plus Eight" – 3:56
3. "I'm in the Mood for Love" (Dorothy Fields, Jimmy McHugh) – 3:06
4. "Phil Up" – 2:33
5. "You Go to My Head" (J. Fred Coots, Haven Gillespie) – 3:25
6. "Billie's Bounce" (Charlie Parker) – 3:14
7. "Stardust" (Hoagy Carmichael, Mitchell Parish) – 6:36
8. "Mean to Me" (Fred E. Ahlert, Roy Turk) – 3:03

== Personnel ==
- James Moody – flute tracks 1–7, tenor saxophone track 8
- Johnny Coles – trumpet 1,6,7,8
- Donald Cole – trombone
- Tate Houston – baritone saxophone
- Jimmy Boyd – piano, peck horn track 1
- Benny Golson – piano track 1
- John Latham – bass
- Clarence Johnston – drums
- Eddie Jefferson – vocals (track 3 and 6)
