= Freddie Roach (organist) =

American jazz organist (1931–1980)

Frederick Roach (May 11, 1931 – October 3, 1980) was an American soul jazz Hammond B3 organist born in The Bronx, New York, United States. He also played the flute and piano though occasionally. Roach's first commercial recordings were with saxophonist Ike Quebec for Blue Note Records in the fall of 1961. These sessions produced Quebec's albums Heavy Soul and It Might as Well Be Spring. In March of 1962, Roach recorded as a backing musician for the Thunderbird album by Willis Jackson. From 1962-64, Roach recorded 5 albums as a leader for Blue Note, and also recorded with Donald Byrd on the album I'm Tryin' to Get Home. Roach's original writing, steady basslines, and highly musical fleet-fingered right hand set him apart. From 1966-67 he recorded three more albums as a leader for Prestige Records, which are in a more commercial vein than his Blue Note dates. Roach's Prestige albums were his last commercial recordings.

Dean Rudland, in the liner notes to a CD reissue of Roach's Prestige albums Soul Book and Mocha Motion, wrote that Roach moved to Paris in the 1970s and worked as an arranger for Oliver Lake's big band. Roach can be heard reciting one of his own poems on a 1974 album by jazz bassist Bob Reid titled Africa Is Calling Me: A Modern Day Black Opera (Kwela Records, 30K010), which was recorded in Paris and featured Oliver Lake.

Roach reportedly later moved to California to work in the film industry. He suffered a heart attack and died in 1980.

== Discography ==
=== As leader ===
- Down to Earth (Blue Note, 1962)
- Mo' Greens Please (Blue Note, 1963)
- Good Move! (Blue Note, 1963)
- Brown Sugar (Blue Note, 1964)
- All That's Good (Blue Note, 1965)
- The Freddie Roach Soul Book (Prestige, 1966)
- Mocha Motion! (Prestige, 1967)
- My People (Soul People) (Prestige, 1967)

=== As sideman ===
With Ike Quebec

- Heavy Soul (Blue Note, 1961)
- It Might as Well Be Spring (Blue Note, 1961)

With Willis Jackson

- Thunderbird (Prestige, 1962)

With Donald Byrd

- I'm Tryin' to Get Home (Blue Note, 1965)
