= Eddie Jefferson =

American jazz vocalist and lyricist (1918–1979)

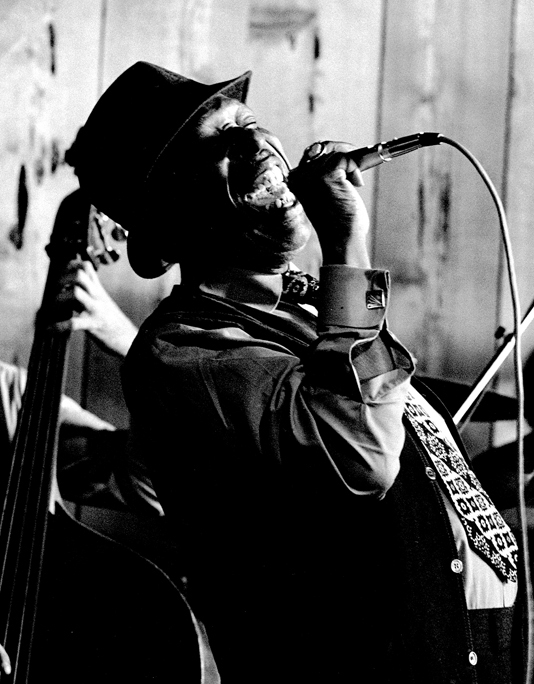
- Jefferson at Half Moon Bay, California, October 10, 1978

Background information
- Born: August 3, 1918; Pittsburgh, Pennsylvania, U.S.
- Died: May 9, 1979 (aged 60) Detroit, Michigan, U.S.
- Genres: Jazz
- Occupations: Singer; songwriter
- Instrument: Vocals

Eddie Jefferson (August 3, 1918 – May 9, 1979) was an American jazz vocalist and lyricist. He is credited as an innovator of vocalese, a musical style in which lyrics are set to an instrumental composition or solo. Jefferson himself claims that his main influence was Leo Watson. Perhaps Jefferson's best-known song is "Moody's Mood for Love" which was recorded in 1952 by King Pleasure and catapulted the contrafact into wide popularity (King Pleasure even cites Jefferson as a personal influence). Jefferson's recordings of Charlie Parker's "Parker's Mood" and Horace Silver's "Filthy McNasty" were also hits.

== Biography ==
Jefferson was born in Pittsburgh, Pennsylvania, United States. One of his most notable recordings, "So What", combined the lyrics of artist Christopher Acemandese Hall with the music of Miles Davis to highlight his skills, and enabled him to turn a phrase, into his style he calls jazz vocalese.

Jefferson's last recorded performance was at the Joe Segal's Jazz Showcase in Chicago and was released on video by Rhapsody Films. He shared the stand with Richie Cole (alto sax), John Campbell (piano), Kelly Sill (bass) and Joel Spencer (drums). The performance was part of a tour that Jefferson and Cole led together. Their opening night in Detroit, Michigan, was at Baker's Keyboard Lounge, a jazz club built in the 1930s that has played host to famous musicians including those who spanned the genre with artists as diverse as Dexter Gordon and Sonny Stitt.

A previously unreleased live recording from July 1976 was released in August 2009 as Eddie Jefferson At Ali's Alley, with the quintet of drummer Rashied Ali featured.

Eddie Jefferson was shot and killed outside Baker's Keyboard Lounge on May 8, 1979, aged 60. He had left the club with fellow bandleader Cole around 1:35 a.m. and was shot while walking out of the building. A late-model Lincoln Continental was spotted speeding away from the scene. The driver was later picked up by Detroit police and identified as a disgruntled dancer with whom Jefferson once worked and had fired from a gig. The suspect was charged with murder, but was later acquitted in a Detroit criminal trial.

The Manhattan Transfer honored both Jefferson and Coleman Hawkins in their vocal version of "Body and Soul" on their album Extensions in 1979.

== Discography ==
- Letter from Home (Riverside, 1962)
- Body and Soul (Prestige, 1968)
- Come Along with Me (Prestige, 1969)
- The Bebop Singers with Annie Ross, Joe Carroll (Prestige, 1970)
- Things Are Getting Better (Muse, 1974)
- Still on the Planet (Muse, 1976)
- The Jazz Singer (Inner City, 1976)
- The Main Man (Inner City, 1977)
- The Live-Liest (Muse, 1979)

With Richie Cole

- New York Afternoon (Muse, 1977)
- Alto Madness (Muse, 1977)
- Keeper of the Flame (Muse, 1979)
- Live at the Douglas Beach House 1978 (Just Jazz, 1995)
- Hollywood Madness (Muse, 1979)

With Dexter Gordon

- Great Encounters (Columbia, 1979)

With James Moody

- Moody's Workshop (Prestige, 1954)
- Hi Fi Party (Prestige, 1955)
- Flute 'n the Blues (Argo, 1956)
- Moody's Mood for Love (Argo, 1957)
- Hey! It's James Moody (Argo, 1959)
- Cookin' the Blues (Argo, 1964)
- Don't Look Away Now! (Prestige, 1969)
- James Moody's Heritage Hum (Perception, 1971)

With Frank Wright

- Kevin, My Dear Son (Recorded: October 1978) (Chiaroscuro, 1979)

== See also ==
- List of homicides in Michigan
- The Bank Dick (for the "Filthy McNasty" character)
