= James Moody (saxophonist) =

American jazz musician (1925–2010)

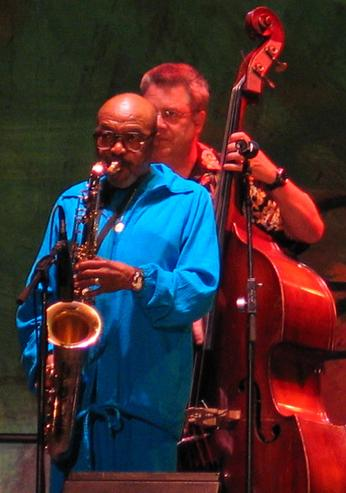
- Moody with Todd Coolman in 2007

Background information
- Born: March 26, 1925; Savannah, Georgia, U.S.
- Died: December 9, 2010 (aged 85) San Diego, California, U.S.
- Genre: Jazz
- Occupation: Musician
- Instruments: Tenor saxophone; alto saxophone; flute; vocals
- Years active: 1947–2010
- Labels: Blue Note; Novus; Prestige
- Website: www.jamesmoody.com

James Moody (March 26, 1925 – December 9, 2010) was an American jazz saxophonist, flautist, and very occasional vocalist, playing predominantly in the bebop and hard bop styles. Named for him, the annual James Moody Jazz Festival is held in Newark, New Jersey.

Moody had an unexpected hit with "Moody's Mood for Love", a 1952 song written by Eddie Jefferson, which used as its melody an improvised solo that Moody had played on a 1949 recording of "I'm in the Mood for Love". Moody adopted the song as his own, recording it with Jefferson on his 1956 album Moody's Mood for Love and performing the song regularly in concert, often singing the vocals himself.

== Early life ==
James Moody was born in Savannah, Georgia, and was raised by his single mother, Ruby Hann Moody Watters. His absent father was a trumpeter in Tiny Bradshaw's group. He had a brother, Louis Edward Watters. Growing up in Newark, New Jersey, he was attracted to the saxophone after hearing Lester Young, Buddy Tate, Don Byas, and various saxophonists who played with Count Basie. At age 16, his uncle, Louis, bought him his first saxophone, an alto. His first playing model was Jimmy Dorsey, followed by Charlie Barnet and Georgie Auld, but early on he was self-taught, playing by ear and learning mostly from listening to records.

== Career ==
Moody joined the US Army Air Corps in 1943 and played in the "negro band" at the segregated Greensboro Training Center. According to Moody,

And then I was drafted into the Air Force. And they said, "Does anyone here play an instrument?" No—they said, "Does anyone here have an instrument?" And I said, "Yeah, I've got one." They said, "Send for it." They didn't ask if you could play it, they just said if you had it. I said yeah. So I sent for the instrument and they formed a band ... And they had the official Air Force Band come over and teach the Negro band. And after about a year or so, man, our band was really nice, it sounded good. So they would come over and listen to our band. And I made some good friends with some of the guys ...

Following his discharge from the military in 1946, he played bebop with Dizzy Gillespie for two years. Moody later played with Gillespie in 1964, where his colleagues in the Gillespie group, pianist Kenny Barron and guitarist Les Spann, would be musical collaborators in the coming decades.

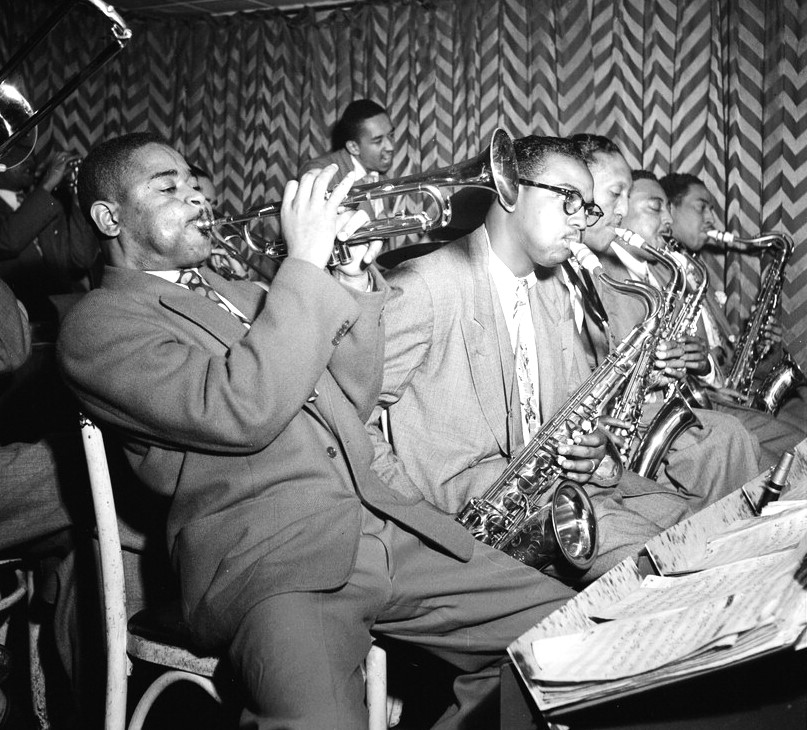
Moody (second from left) with Dizzy Gillispie, Downbeat Club, New York City, 1947

In 1948, Moody recorded for Blue Note, his first session in a long recording career playing both saxophone and flute. That same year, he relocated to Europe, where he stayed for three years, saying he had been "scarred by racism" in the U.S. His European work, including the first recording of "Moody's Mood for Love", which became a hit in 1952, saw him add the alto saxophone to his repertoire, helped to establish him as recording artist in his own right, and formed part of the growth of European jazz. Then in 1952, he returned to the U.S. to a recording career with Prestige Records and others, playing the flute and saxophone in bands that included musicians such as Pee Wee Moore and others.

Even up to recording "Moody's Mood for Love", Moody was still an ear player. It was not until he returned to the U.S. and toured with The Brook Benton Revue (with the James Moody Orchestra) that he became acquainted with music theory, crediting Tom McIntosh with explaining chord changes to him.

Moody and his Orchestra performed for the 11th famed Cavalcade of Jazz concert held at Wrigley Field in Los Angeles, which was produced by Leon Hefflin Sr. on July 24, 1955, and also featured Big Jay McNeely, Lionel Hampton and His Orchestra, The Medallions, and The Penguins.

In the 1960s, Moody rejoined Dizzy Gillespie and later also worked with Mike Longo.

From 1974 into the 1980s, Moody found steady work playing in Las Vegas show bands. He was part of the Gene Harris–led Phillip Morris Super Band which toured the world during the late 1980s and early 1990s.

In 1997, Moody appeared as William Glover, a law-firm porter, in Clint Eastwood's movie adaptation of John Berendt's novel Midnight in the Garden of Good and Evil. He walked Patrick, an invisible dog, in the movie. During the dog's lifetime, Glover was paid $10 by its owner, attorney John Bouhan, to walk Patrick. After the death of both Bouhan and his dog, a judge agreed that Glover should continue to receive $10 for "walking" Patrick.

In a 1998 interview with Bob Bernotas, Moody stated that he believed jazz has definite spiritual resonance.

The James Moody Quartet (with pianist Renee Rosnes, bassist Todd Coolman, and drummer Adam Nussbaum) was Moody's vehicle later in his career. Moody played regularly with the Dizzy Gillespie Alumni All-Stars and the Dizzy Gillespie All-Star Big Band and also often collaborated with a former Gillespie alumnus, the trumpeter-composer-conductor Jon Faddis; Faddis and Moody worked in 2007 with the WDR Big Band in Cologne, Germany, under the direction of Michael Abene. Along with Faddis, he toured in 1986 with the Philip Morris Superband, hosting artists like Hammond organist Jimmy Smith, Kenny Burrell, Grady Tate, and Barbara Morrison. Included in this line-up were Niels-Henning Ørsted Pedersen, Jimmy Heath, Kenny Washington, Slide Hampton, and Monty Alexander on a four-country, 14-city, one-month tour of 18 concerts, notably in Australia, Canada, Japan, and the Philippines, starting on September 3, 1986, with its first concert in Perth, Australia. The Philip Morris Superband concept started a year previous in 1985.

== Awards and honors ==
Two months after Moody's death in 2010, his album Moody 4B won the Grammy Award for Best Jazz Instrumental Album.

The New Jersey Performing Arts Center hosts the James Moody Jazz Festival annually in Newark, New Jersey.

== Personal life ==
Moody was married three times; the first two marriages ended in divorce. His third marriage was to the former Linda Petersen McGowan, whom he married in 1989. He had a daughter and, through Linda, three stepsons. Moody and his wife resided in San Diego, California.

Moody suffered from alcoholism and accompanying mental-health issues during part of his career. In April 1958, with the help of his mother, Moody checked into Overbrook Asylum and was treated until his discharge in September of that year.

He was an active member of the Baháʼí Faith. He investigated and took up the faith after his friend Dizzy Gillespie died. For a time, Moody held belief in the ancient astronaut theory detailed in Zecharia Sitchin's book The 12th Planet, sometimes advocating it to listeners at live events.

In 2005, the Moodys established the Moody Scholarship Fund at the Conservatory of Music at Purchase College–State University of New York (SUNY Purchase). Moody was awarded an NEA Jazz Masters Fellowship in 1998 and often participated in educational programming and outreach, including with the International Association for Jazz Education (IAJE).

Moody was fluent in Italian.

== Death ==
On November 2, 2010, Moody's wife announced on his behalf that he had pancreatic cancer and had chosen not to have it treated aggressively. After palliative care, Moody died in San Diego, on December 9, 2010, from complications resulting from the cancer.

== Discography ==
=== As leader ===
- 1949: James Moody's Greatest Hits! with The Swedish All Stars (Prestige [1966])
- 1951: More of James Moody's Greatest Hits with The Swedish All Stars (Prestige [1967])
- 1952: James Moody and his Modernists (Blue Note)
- 1952: James Moody with Strings (Blue Note) – Conducted by André Hodeir (originally Moody's Mood, Vogue (France))
- 1954: Moody (Prestige)
- 1954–55: James Moody's Moods (Prestige)
- 1955: Hi Fi Party (Prestige)
- 1955: Wail, Moody, Wail (Prestige)
- 1956: Flute 'n the Blues (Argo)
- 1956: Moody's Mood for Love (Argo)
- 1958: Last Train from Overbrook (Argo)
- 1959: James Moody (Argo)
- 1960: Hey! It's James Moody (Argo)
- 1960–61: Moody with Strings (Argo)
- 1961: Cookin' the Blues (Argo)
- 1962: Another Bag (Argo)
- 1963: Great Day (Argo)
- 1963: Comin' On Strong (Argo)
- 1964: Running the Gamut (Scepter)
- 1966: Moody and the Brass Figures (Milestone)
- 1968–69: The Blues and Other Colors (Milestone)
- 1969: Don't Look Away Now! (Prestige)
- 1970: Teachers (Perception)
- 1971: Heritage Hum (Perception)
- 1971: Chicago Concert (Prestige) with Gene Ammons
- 1972: Never Again! (Muse)
- 1973: Feelin' It Together (Muse)
- 1973: Sax and Flute Man (Paula)
- 1976: Timeless Aura (Vanguard)
- 1976: Sun Journey (Vanguard)
- 1977: Beyond this World (Vanguard)
- 1986: Something Special (Novus)
- 1989: Sweet and Lovely (Novus)
- 1991: Moving Forward (Novus)
- 1991: Honey (Novus)
- 1995: Moody's Party: Live at the Blue Note (Telarc)
- 1996: Young at Heart (Warner Bros.)
- 1997: Moody Plays Mancini (Warner Bros.)
- 1997: Warner Jams, Vol. 2: The Two Tenors with Mark Turner, Larry Goldings (Warner Bros.)
- 1998: At the Jazz Workshop GRP AllMusic
- 2003: Homage (Savoy)
- 2005: The World Is a Ghetto (Fuel 2000)
- 2008: Our Delight with Hank Jones (IPO)
- 2009: Moody 4A (IPO)
- 2010: Moody 4B (IPO)

=== As sideman ===
With Art Farmer

- New York Jazz Sextet: Group Therapy (Scepter, 1966)

With Gil Fuller

- Night Flight (Pacific Jazz, 1965)—all titles released on CD reissue of Gil Fuller & the Monterey Jazz Festival Orchestra featuring Dizzy Gillespie

With Dizzy Gillespie

- The Complete RCA Victor Recordings (Bluebird, 1937-1949 [1995])
- Big Band in Concert (GNP Crescendo, 1948)
- The New Continent (Limelight, 1962)
- Something Old, Something New (Philips, 1963)
- Dizzy Gillespie and the Double Six of Paris (Philips, 1964)
- Dizzy Goes Hollywood (Philips, 1964)
- The Cool World (Philips, 1964)
- Jambo Caribe (Limelight, 1964)
- I/We Had a Ball (Limelight, 1965) - 1 track
- The Melody Lingers On (Limelight, 1966)
- Swing Low, Sweet Cadillac (Impulse!, 1967)
- The Dizzy Gillespie Reunion Big Band (MPS, 1968)
- The Real Thing (Perception, 1969)
- Musician, Composer, Raconteur (Pablo, 1981)
- Live at the Royal Festival Hall (Enja, 1989)

With The Dizzy Gillespie Alumni All-Stars

- Dizzy's World directed by Jon Faddis (Shanachie, 1999)
- Things to Come (Telarc, 2001)

With The Dizzy Gillespie All-Star Big Band

- Dizzy's Business (MCG Jazz, 2006)
- I'm Be Boppin' Too (Half Note, 2009)

With Dexter Gordon

- The Tower of Power! (Prestige, 1969)
- More Power! (Prestige, 1969)

With Milt Jackson

- Big Bags (Riverside, 1962)
- Milt Jackson at the Museum of Modern Art (Limelight, 1965)
- Milt Jackson and the Hip String Quartet (Verve, 1968)

With Elvin Jones

- Summit Meeting (Vanguard, 1976) with Clark Terry, Bunky Green and Roland Prince

With Quincy Jones

- I/We Had a Ball (Limelight, 1965)
- Quincy Plays for Pussycats (Mercury, 1959-65 [1965])

With Charles Mingus

- Charles Mingus and Friends in Concert (Columbia, 1972)

With Max Roach

- New Sounds: Max Roach Quintet/Art Blakey's Band (Blue Note, 1952)

With Lalo Schifrin

- Once a Thief and Other Themes (Verve, 1965)

With Bobby Timmons

- Got to Get It! (Milestone, 1967)

With Cedar Walton

- Soul Cycle (Prestige, 1969)

With Tubby Hayes

- Return Visit! (Fontana, 1962) Credited as "Jimmy Gloomy"

With Roberta Gambarini

- Easy to Love (Groovin' High/Kindred Rhythm, 2006) Moody plays tenor sax and sings with Roberta on "Lover Man" and "Centerpiece".
- So in Love (Groovin' High/EmArcy/UMe, 2009)
