= Eddie Gladden =

American jazz drummer

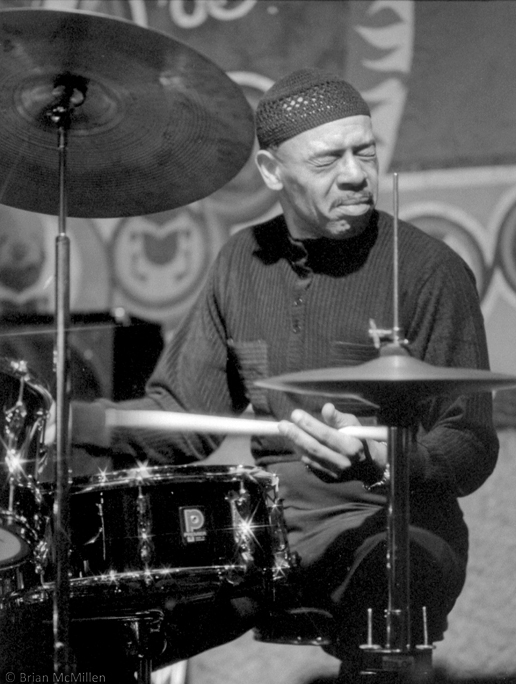
- Eddie Gladden at Keystone Korner in San Francisco, California with the Dexter Gordon Quartet in 1981

Background information
- Born: December 6, 1937; Newark, New Jersey, U.S.
- Died: September 30, 2003 (aged 65) Newark
- Genre: Jazz
- Occupation: Musician
- Instrument: Drums
- Years active: 1972–1990s

Eddie Gladden (December 6, 1937 – September 30, 2003) was an American jazz drummer.

== Career ==
Gladden played professionally from 1962 in his hometown of Newark. In 1972 he began working with James Moody. During the rest of his career he worked with Eddie Jefferson, Richie Cole, Cecil Payne, Horace Silver, David Fathead Newman, Larry Young, Freddie Roach, Jimmy McGriff, Richard "Groove" Holmes, Kirk Lightsey, Clifford Jordan, Albert Dailey, Jimmy Ponder, Shirley Scott, and Mickey Tucker, among others. He played in Dexter Gordon's quartet from 1977, touring and recording.

He died of a heart attack in Newark at the age of 65. Gladden never recorded as a session leader.

== Discography ==
=== As sideman ===
With Richie Cole

- New York Afternoon (Muse, 1977)
- Alto Madness (Muse, 1978)
- Keeper of the Flame (Muse, 1979)

With Dexter Gordon

- Great Encounters (Columbia, 1978)
- Manhattan Symphonie (Columbia, 1978)
- American Classic (Elektra Musician 1982)
- Nights at the Keystone (Blue Note, 1985)
- Nights at the Keystone Volume 1 (Blue Note, 1990)
- Nights at the Keystone Volume 2 (Blue Note, 1990)
- Nights at the Keystone Volume 3 (Blue Note, 1990)
- Sophisticated Giant (Columbia, 1990)
- Ballads (Blue Note, 1991)
- More Than You Know 1981 (GleAM Records, 2025)

With Eddie Jefferson

- Things Are Getting Better (Muse, 1974)
- Still on the Planet (Muse, 1976)
- The Live-Liest (Muse, 1979)

With Kirk Lightsey

- Isotope (Criss Cross, 1983)
- Everything Happens to Me (Timeless, 1983)
- Kirk 'n Marcus (Criss Cross, 1987)
- Everything Is Changed (Sunnyside, 1987)
- First Affairs (Lime Tree, 1987)
- Temptation (Baystate, 1988)

With James Moody

- Never Again! (Muse, 1972)
- Timeless Aura (Vanguard, 1976)
- Sun Journey (Vanguard, 1976)

With John Patton

- Blue Planet Man (King, 1993)
- This One's for Ja (DIW, 1996)

With Freddie Roach

- Mocha Motion! (Prestige, 1967)
- My People (Soul People) (Prestige, 1967)

With Mickey Tucker

- The New Heritage Keyboard Quartet (Blue Note, 1973)
- Triplicity (Xanadu, 1975)
- Sojourn (Xanadu, 1977)
- Mister Mysterious (Muse, 1978)
- Mister Mysterious (Muse, 1979)
- Theme for a Woogie-Boogie (Denon, 1979)

With Larry Young

- Contrasts (Blue Note, 1967)
- Heaven on Earth (Blue Note, 1968)
- Mother Ship (Blue Note, 1980)

With others

- Chet Baker, Blues for a Reason (Criss Cross, 1985)
- George Cables, Circle (Contemporary, 1985)
- Ronnie Cuber, The Eleventh Day of Aquarius (Xanadu, 1978)
- Albert Dailey, Textures (Muse, 1981)
- Bruce Forman, The Bash (Muse, 1985)
- Della Griffin, I'll Get By (Muse, 1996)
- Clifford Jordan, Two Tenor Winner (Criss Cross, 1985)
- Eric Kloss, Battle of the Saxes (Muse, 1977)
- Jimmy McGriff, The Main Squeeze (Groove Merchant, 1974)
- David "Fathead" Newman, Heads Up (Atlantic, 1987)
- Jimmy Ponder, Jump (Muse, 1989)
- Jimmy Raney, The Master (Criss Cross, 1984)
- Rufus Reid, Perpetual Stroll (Theresa, 1981)
- Red Rodney, Red, White and Blues (Muse, 1978)
- John Stubblefield, Confessin' (Soul Note, 1985)
- Buddy Terry, Natural Soul (Prestige, 1968)
