= Terry Silverlight =

Background information
- Genres: Jazz, pop, rock, R&B
- Occupations: Musician, drummer, composer, record producer, arranger, author
- Instrument: Drums
- Years active: 1971–present
- Website: www.terrysilverlight.com

Terry Silverlight is a jazz, pop, rock and R&B drummer, composer, producer, arranger and author.

== Biography ==
Silverlight was born in Newark, New Jersey and grew up in North Plainfield, New Jersey. He made his debut as a drummer on Barry Miles' 's White Heat album, recorded in 1971 when Silverlight was fourteen years old. That early jazz/fusion album featured Barry Miles's compositions along with performances by guitarists Pat Martino, John Abercrombie, and saxophonist/flutist Lew Tabackin. Silverlight drummed on several more Barry Miles recordings throughout the 1970s performing alongside Al Di Meola, Vic Juris, Eric Kloss and Richard Davis.

After attending Princeton University, Silverlight moved to Manhattan and embarked upon a studio session career, playing drums on recordings for artists including Billy Ocean, George Benson, Laura Nyro, Stephanie Mills, Freddie Jackson, Anne Murray, Natalie Merchant, Jonathan Butler, Stephen Stills, Mel Tormé, Phil Woods, Tom Jones, Change, Odyssey, jingles, and film scores including You've Got Mail, One Fine Day, My Blue Heaven, Titus, What Planet Are You From? and Frida.

Silverlight has authored three drum books; The Featured Drummer, The Stick Bag of Jazz, Funk, Fusion and Gig Bag Series for Drummers: Rhythm & Percussion. All are published by Music Sales Corporation. He has been an educator appearing at clinics including PASIC (Percussive Arts Society), Sam Ash Music and Brooklyn College. He taught drums at the Drummers Collective (DCI) in Manhattan from 1981-1985.

Silverlight toured worldwide as a member of Roberta Flack's band from 1986–1988, and has toured Japan yearly as a member of David Matthews's Manhattan Jazz Orchestra (MJO) since 1996, having recorded several albums with that group.

Simultaneous to his drumming career, Silverlight has written songs, composed, produced, and arranged music for network TV shows including One Life to Live, The Young and the Restless, The Sopranos, All My Children, Beverly Hills, 90210, Melrose Place, CSI: Crime Scene Investigation, NCIS, Smallville, Ghost Whisperer, Strong Medicine, The District, Las Vegas, Sabrina, the Teenage Witch, 7th Heaven, The Shield, Burn Notice, South Beach, jingle products Reebok, Nicorette, Pantene, Crisco, the films Invincible with Mark Wahlberg, Head over Heels with Monica Potter/Freddie Prinze, Jr., Marci X with Lisa Kudrow, Sunshine Cleaning with Alan Arkin/Emily Blunt/Amy Adams, Mad About Mambo with Keri Russell, and songs recorded by Nancy Wilson, Les McCann, Carl Anderson, Phillip Ingram (Switch V), Louise Redknapp and Judy Torres.

Silverlight has seven solo artist recordings featuring his drumming and original compositions. Four are in the jazz genre: Terry Silverlight, Wild!!, Diamond in the Riff, and Live!, showcasing performances by Barry Miles, Will Lee, Paul Shaffer, Edgar Winter, Hiram Bullock, Chuck Loeb, Lew Soloff, and Bill Evans, among others. Three of the albums are in the pop genre featuring Silverlight's work as a songwriter, producer and arranger: Songwriter Producer: Volumes I & II, Collaborations: Volumes I & II, and Music To Picture.

== Discography ==
=== As leader ===
- Terry Silverlight (1997)
- Wild!! (2004)
- Diamond in the Riff (2008)
- Live! (2009)

=== As songwriter/producer/composer/arranger ===
- Songwriter/Producer: Volumes I & II (2009)
- Collaborations: Volumes I & II (2009)
- Music to Picture (2010)

=== As pop/R&B/rock drummer sideman ===
- Twice the Love (George Benson)
- The Butcher Boy (Music from the Motion Picture)
- Jonathan Butler (Jonathan Butler)
- More Than Friends (Jonathan Butler)
- Signature (Ann Hampton Callaway)
- Miracles (Change)
- Sharing Your Love (Change)
- Spanish Fever (Fania All-Stars)
- Looking For The Light (Larry Hoppen (Orleans (band)))
- Rock Me Tonight (Freddie Jackson)
- Don't Let Love Slip Away (Freddie Jackson)
- An Imitation of Love (Millie Jackson)
- Let It Roll (Don Johnson)
- Move Closer (Tom Jones)
- Times of Your Life (Michel Legrand)
- Retrospective: 1995–2005 (Natalie Merchant)
- If I Were Your Woman (Stephanie Mills)
- Read My Lips (Melba Moore)
- Something to Talk About (Anne Murray)
- Mother's Spiritual (Laura Nyro)
- Stoned Soul Picnic: The Best of Laura Nyro (Laura Nyro)
- Suddenly (Billy Ocean album) (Billy Ocean)
- Love Zone (Billy Ocean)
- Tear Down These Walls (Billy Ocean)
- Odyssey ("Native New Yorker") (Odyssey)
- One Fine Day (Music from the Motion Picture)
- Only Human (Jeffrey Osborne)
- Back to Basics (The Reddings)
- Restless (Starpoint)
- One Moment in Time (Summer Olympics Album 1988)
- Titus (Music from the Motion Picture)
- You've Got Mail (Music from the Motion Picture)
- Out on the Street (John Simon with Levon Helm, Ron Carter, Toots Thielemans)
- Harmony Farm (John Simon)
- Home (John Simon)

=== As jazz drummer sideman ===
- Everything I Love (Chris Connor)
- CTI Summer Jazz At The Hollywood Bowl/Live Two (CTI All-Stars)
- In My Wildest Dreams (Tom Grant)
- Hands: The Tom Grant Collection (Tom Grant)
- Roadsong (Vic Juris)
- Bleecker Street (Vic Juris)
- Horizon Drive (Vic Juris)
- Bodies' Warmth (Eric Kloss)
- Celebration (Eric Kloss)
- Get It On (David Matthews and Manhattan Jazz Orchestra)
- Paint It Black (David Matthews and Manhattan Jazz Orchestra)
- Black Magic Woman (David Matthews and Manhattan Jazz Orchestra)
- Hey Duke (David Matthews and Manhattan Jazz Orchestra)
- Bach 2000 (David Matthews and Manhattan Jazz Orchestra)
- Some Skunk Funk (David Matthews and Manhattan Jazz Orchestra)
- Birdland (David Matthews and Manhattan Jazz Orchestra)
- Swing, Swing, Swing (David Matthews and Manhattan Jazz Orchestra)
- Spain (David Matthews and Manhattan Jazz Orchestra)
- In the Mood (David Matthews and Manhattan Jazz Orchestra)
- White Heat (Barry Miles)
- Scatbird (Barry Miles)
- Barry Miles and Silverlight (Barry Miles)
- Magic Theatre (Barry Miles)
- Sky Train (Barry Miles)
- Fusion Is...Barry Miles (Barry Miles)
- Zoot Suit Stomp (Barry Miles)
- Blue Thumb (Gil Parris)
- World Beat Trio (John Tennyson with Dewey Redman, Randy Brecker)
- Torme-A New Album (Mel Tormé)
- Nightwings (Louis Van Dyke with Niels-Henning Ørsted Pedersen)
- London Sessions (Larry Wilcox with Kenny Wheeler)
- Seven Deadly Sins (Phil Woods)

=== As drummer on other records ===
- Aria 2 (Aria/Paul Schwartz)
- It's About Time (Dan Barrett)
- Imperfect Rhymes (Bobby Belfry)
- Solus (Brythonwen)
- Unfinished Business (John Bristow)
- NY Confidential (Forrest Buchtel)
- La Nueva Vanguardia (Miguel Cantilo)
- Nica's Dream (Charito with Manhattan Jazz Orchestra) (David Matthews)
- Christmas of Peace (New Song Community Partnership)
- NY International (Tony Cimorosi)
- Stay (The Controllers)
- Sun Is All We Need (Zack Danziger)
- Deuce (Deuce)
- Not That Different (Natalie Douglas)
- Moishele (Moishe Dovid)
- Jewel Eyes (Frank Ferrucci)
- Street World Beat (Sanshiro Fujimoto)
- 9 to 5 (Blanca Goodfriend)
- Sarah Greene (Sarah Greene)
- Never Been So (Sarah Greene)
- Donna Groom Sings Standards (Donna Groom) (David Matthews (keyboardist)
- A Day in the Life of a Mother and Wife (Cat Guthrie)
- String Theory (Gary Haase)
- Songs From Another Place (Monica Harte/Brian Willson)
- Only a Heartbeat Away (The Heartbeats)
- Instead of Words (Bob Hinz)
- Live at Montreaux Vol.2 (Chris Hinze)
- Iimpressies (Chris Hinze)
- Match Game (Marti Jones)
- En Las Buenas Y en las Malas (José José)
- Vol.6-35 Aniversario 1989-94 (José José)
- Funky Three Strings (Kino meets David Matthews & N.Y.Friends) (David Matthews (keyboardist)
- Haven't You Heard? (Paul Laurence)
- My Love Is Here (Carolyn Leonhart)
- Lernertres (Alejandro Lerner)
- Louisiana Moon (Rich Look)
- Energia (Valeria Lynch)
- Guitars on Fire (David Matthews)
- Super Latin/Jazz Watermelon Man (David Matthews)
- Super Latin/Jazz Mambo No. 5 (David Matthews)
- Furuhata Jazz in New York (David Matthews)
- Sydney Winds/'00 Olympics album (David Matthews)
- 1999–2006 Best of Best-MJO (David Matthews)
- Messiah (Al McDowell)
- Feeling Mighty Nice (Paul Metzke)
- I'll Do Anything for You (Denroy Morgan/Essential Mix: Classic Edition)
- Out of the Shadows (Oasis)
- Bossa Nova (Panasonic Sound Essay)
- Pegasus (Ram)
- Calypso (Ron)
- Look to the Sky (Steve Sacks)
- Love Either Goes Or Grows (Scandal featuring Lee Genesis)
- In Due Time (Dave Shank)
- The Beast in Me (Silence 2)
- Manual for the Moral Minded (Lenny Solomon/Shlock Rock)
- Notes From All Over (Nikki Stern)
- Salsa Verde (Supergroup)
- Salsa Green-Go (Supergroup)
- Something's Coming (Grace Testani)
- I Wish (Higashida Tomohiro)
- Cycle (Higashida Tomohiro)
- Journey Home (Joe Travers)
- Gut Reaction (Troia and Grier)
- Welcome 2 My World (Gene Williams)
- Surrender (Working Week)
- Feels So Good (Ze-Brass)
- Street Level (Zinc)
- Swinging Guitar Sounds of Young America (Vinnie Zummo)
