= Triplicity (Mickey Tucker album) =

Studio album by Mickey Tucker
- Released: 1976
- Recorded: December 22, 1975; RCA Studios, New York City
- Genre: Jazz
- Label: Xanadu; 128
- Producer: Don Schlitten

Mickey Tucker chronology
The New Heritage Keyboard Quartet (1973)	Triplicity (1976)	Doublet (1976)

Triplicity is an album by pianist Mickey Tucker which was recorded in 1975 and released on the Xanadu label.

== Reception ==
Professional ratings
Review scores
Source	Rating
Allmusic	3/5 stars

The Allmusic review awarded the album 3 stars. Down Beat stated "Tucker's dazzling harmonic sensibility is impressively united with an idiomatic eclecticism embracing everything from ragtime to Cecil Taylorish flurries".

== Track listing ==
All compositions by Mickey Tucker except as indicated

1. "Happy" - 4:54
2. "Blues for Khalid Yasin" - 4:48
3. "Malapaga" - 8:34
4. "Strange Blues" - 5:32
5. "Giant Steps" (John Coltrane) - 5:36
6. "Suite for Eddie: The Man from Gladden" - 5:48
7. "Suite for Eddie: Something for a Quiet Man" - 7:35
8. "Suite for Eddie: Boyd Street Bop" - 4:17

== Personnel ==
- Mickey Tucker - piano, organ
- Jimmy Ponder - guitar (tracks 5–8)
- Gene Perla - bass
- Eddie Gladden - drums
