= Mickey Tucker =

- Born: April 28, 1941 (age 85); Durham, North Carolina, U.S.
- Genres: Jazz
- Occupation: Musician
- Instruments: Piano, organ
- Years active: 1960s–present
- Labels: Xanadu, Muse, Steeplechase, Denon

Mickey Tucker (born Michael B. Tucker; April 28, 1941) is an American jazz pianist and organist.

== Biography ==
Tucker was born in Durham, North Carolina in 1941. He grew up in Rankin, Pennsylvania before moving back to North Carolina aged 12. When he was six, he started learning piano, eventually playing in church. While at high school, Tucker played in the school band as well as in a trio that included Grady Tate. Aged 15, Tucker received an early admission scholarship to attend Morehouse College. He became a teacher and taught at a high school in Lake Wales, Florida and Mississippi Valley State College while also performing music.

Tucker left Mississippi in 1964 and moved to New York City. In New York, he performed with Damita Jo, with whom he toured London. He moved on to have stints working with comedian Timmy Rogers, Little Anthony and the Imperials and as organist for James Moody. He entered the jazz world in 1969, working for the next several years with Eric Kloss, Rahsaan Roland Kirk, the Thad Jones/Mel Lewis Orchestra, Eddie Jefferson, and George Benson. He was music director for Art Blakey and the Jazz Messengers. During the 1980s, he appeared on albums by Phil Woods, Art Farmer, Richie Cole, and Benny Golson.

In 1989, Tucker move to Melbourne, Australia. In an interview with Cadence magazine, Tucker explained that he moved to Australia following the murder of two women in his apartment complex in 1987. Tucker's friend, who Tucker says was with him at the time of crime, was accused of the murders. The stress caused by trying to help his friend led him to decide to move to Australia – where his wife was from.

In Melbourne, Tucker worked at the Victorian College of the Arts' School of Music.

== Discography ==
=== As leader ===
- Triplicity (Xanadu, 1975)
- Doublet (Dan, 1976)
- Sojourn (Xanadu, 1977)
- Mister Mysterious (Muse, 1978)
- The Crawl (Muse, 1979)
- Blues in Five Dimensions (SteepleChase, 1989)
- Sweet Lotus Lips (Denon, 1989)
- Hang in There (SteepleChase, 1994)
- Gettin' There (SteepleChase, 1995)

=== As sideman ===
With Richie Cole

- New York Afternoon (Muse, 1977)

With Junior Cook

- Pressure Cooker (Catalyst, 1977)
- The Place to Be (SteepleChase, 1988)
- On a Misty Night (SteepleChase, 1989)
- You Leave Me Breathless (SteepleChase, 1991)

With Frank Foster

- 1968 Manhattan Fever
- 1978 Twelve Shades of Black
- 1979 Non-Electric Company
- 1998 Swing
- 2007 Well Water

With Bill Hardman

- Home (Muse, 1978)
- What's Up (SteepleChase, 1989)

With Louis Hayes

- The Crawl (Candid, 1989)

With Willis Jackson

- 1973 West Africa
- 1974 Headed and Gutted

With Eddie Jefferson

- Things Are Getting Better (Muse, 1974)
- Still on the Planet (Muse, 1976)
- 1999 Vocal Ease

With Rahsaan Roland Kirk

- 1971 Blacknuss
- 1978 The Vibration Continues
- 1999 Left Hook Right Cross

With Eric Kloss

- 1974 Essence (Muse)
- 1976 Battle of the Saxes (Muse)

With Johnny Lytle

- 1980 Fast Hands
- 1997 Easy Easy

With the Art Farmer/Benny Golson Jazztet

- Stablemates, Art Farmer/Tommy Flanagan (1979)
- Moment to Moment (Soul Note, 1983)
- Nostalgia (Baystate, 1983)
- Back to the City (Contemporary, 1986)
- Real Time (Contemporary, 1986 [1988])

With Philly Joe Jones

- Mean What You Say (Sonet, 1977)

With Archie Shepp

- 1978 Live in Tokyo
- 1989 Tray of Silver

With George Benson

- 1981 Jazz on a Sunday Afternoon, Volume 1 (rec. 1973)
- 1981 Jazz on a Sunday Afternoon, Volume 2
- 1982 Jazz on a Sunday Afternoon, Volume 3
- 1985 Love Walked In
- 1985 The Electrifying George Benson
- 1987 4 for an Afternoon
- 1993 Witchcraft
- 1995 Par Excellence
- 1998 San Francisco: 1972
- 1999 Live: Early Years
- 1999 The Masquerade Is Over
- 2002 After Hours
- 2002 Blue Bossa

With others

- 1972 Never Again!, James Moody
- 1973 The New Heritage Keyboard Quartet, Roland Hanna, Mickey Tucker
- 1974 Live at Town Hall, Roy Brooks
- 1976 Illusions, Jimmy Ponder
- 1976 Invitation, David Schnitter
- 1977 New Horizons, Charles McPherson
- 1978 The Eleventh Day of Aquarius, Ronnie Cuber
- 1982 Sentimental Mood, Mickey Bass
- 1984 Nostalgia, Benny Golson
- 1994 Gentle Time Alone, Ted Dunbar
- 1998 Big Daddy, Bob Ackerman
- 1998 Richie & Phil & Richie, Richie Cole
- 2004 Village in Bubbles, Kazumi Watanabe
- 2007 The Crawl: Live at Birdland, Louis Hayes
