= Glass Vaults =

Musical group from New Zealand

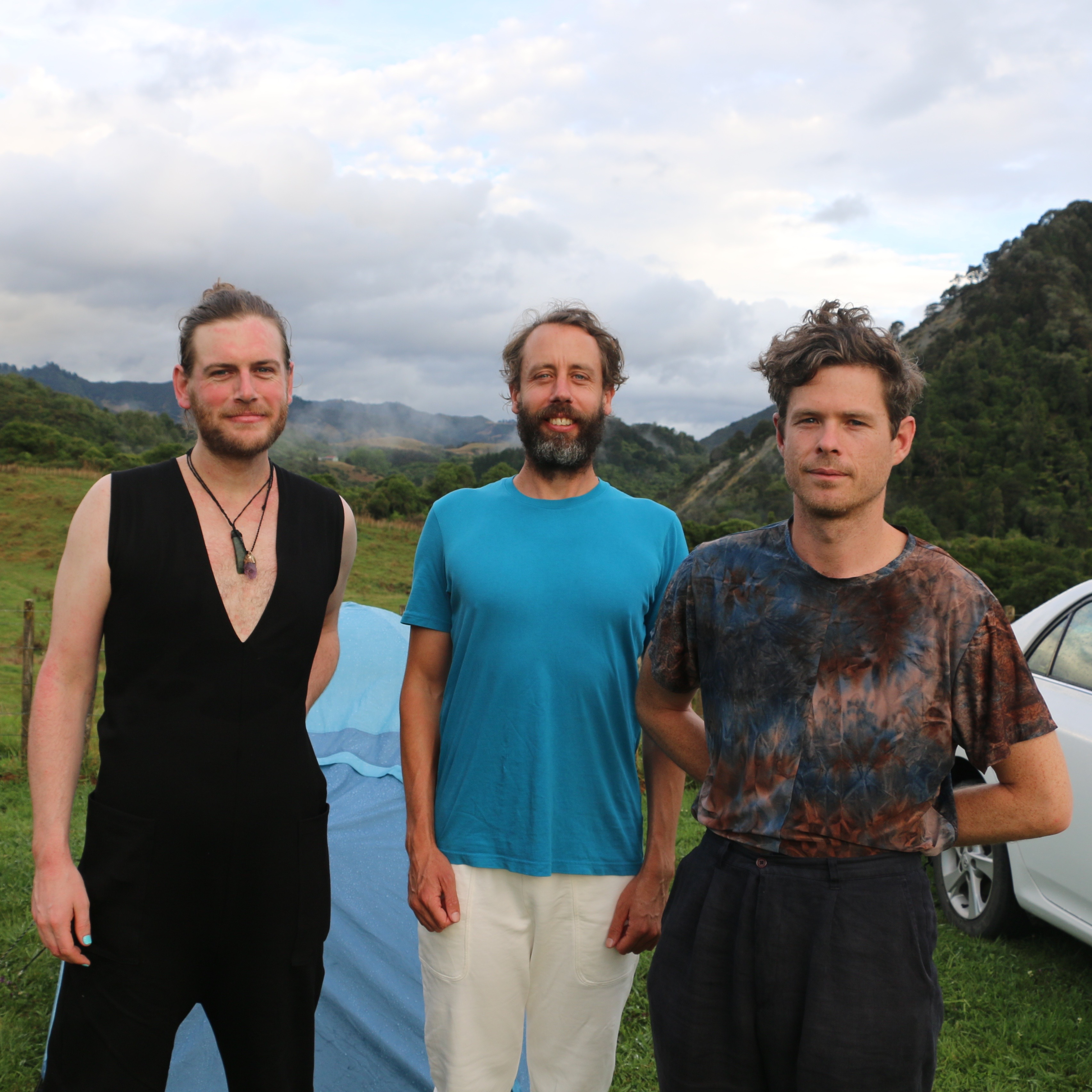
- Glass Vaults in 2017.

Background information
- Origin: Wellington, New Zealand
- Genres: Pop
- Years active: 2010–present
- Members: Richard Larsen; Rowan Pierce; Bevan Smith; Hikurangi Schaverien-Kaa
- Past members: Ben Bro; Daniel Whitaker; Cory Champion

Glass Vaults is a New Zealand indie rock band formed in Wellington, New Zealand.

== History ==
=== Early years ===
The band was founded by Richard Larsen, and Rowan Pierce in 2010 after graduating from Toi Whakaari. The band name was inspired by the vaulted ceilings of cathedrals.

=== Sojourn ===
In 2013, the band began work on their first full-length album Sojourn which was released by Flying Out in mid-2015. Sojourn included such singles as "Life is the Show" and "Ancient Gates", which received extensive airplay on alternative radio stations such as 95bFM and Radioactive.

=== The New Happy ===
Their second album The New Happy, was released in mid-2017 in New Zealand.

The band took aural cues from Autonomous Sensory Meridian Response and influences from tracks of Talking Heads, Tom Tom Club, and Grace Jones with minimal reverb and dry sounding percussion.

== Discography ==
Glass Vaults discography
- Studio albums: 2
- EPs: 3
- Singles: 1

=== Studio albums ===
| Year | Title | Details | Peak chart positions |
| Year | Title | Details | NZ |
|---|---|---|---|
| 2015 | Sojourn | Released: 25 September 2015; Label: Glass Vaults; Catalogue: FOLP006 | 32 |
| 2017 | The New Happy | Released: 12 May 2017; Label: Melodic Records; Catalogue: MELO111 | — |
"—" denotes a recording that did not chart or was not released in that territory.

=== EPs ===
| Year | Title | Details | Peak chart positions |
| Year | Title | Details | NZ |
|---|---|---|---|
| 2010 | Glass | Released: 16 June 2010; Label: Glass Vaults | — |
| 2011 | Into Clear | Released: 31 October 2011; Label: Glass Vaults | — |
| 2013 | Bright | Released: 29 October 2013; Label: Glass Vaults | — |
"—" denotes a recording that did not chart or was not released in that territory.
