= Wild!! =

Studio album by Terry Silverlight
- Released: 2004
- Studio: Avatar
- Genre: Jazz
- Label: self-released
- Producer: Terry Silverlight; Will Lee

Terry Silverlight chronology
Terry Silverlight (1997)	Wild!! (2004)	Diamond in the Riff (2008)

Wild!! is a jazz album by Terry Silverlight.

== Track listing ==
All songs are written by Terry Silverlight.

No.	Title	Length
1.	"Sparkey J's"	5:54
2.	"Pugnacious"	5:05
3.	"Brown 'n Serve"	6:47
4.	"Windsurfing"	7:05
5.	"Wild"	6:22
6.	"Phantom of Bebopera"	4:49
7.	"Yo"	6:25
8.	"WTC"	6:18
9.	"Insane"	6:26
10.	"Closing"	4:38

== Personnel ==
- Terry Silverlight: composer, drums, percussion, keyboards
- Will Lee: bass
- Edgar Winter: vocals, alto sax
- Paul Shaffer: organ
- Hiram Bullock, Chuck Loeb: guitar
- Lew Soloff: trumpet
- David Mann: tenor and soprano sax
- Charles Blenzig, Mike Ricchiuti: keyboards
- John Clark: French horn
