= NBC Orchestra =

NBC Orchestra may refer to:

- NBC Symphony Orchestra, which existed from 1937 until 1954
- The Tonight Show Band, who used the name from 1962 to 1992
- Paul Shaffer and the World's Most Dangerous Band, who used the name briefly from 1987 to 1988
