= Felicia Collins =

American vocalist and guitarist (born 1964)

Felicia Michele Collins (born April 10, 1964 in Jackson, Tennessee) is an American vocalist, guitarist and occasional percussionist. She is best known for her work on the CBS television program Late Show with David Letterman, as part of the CBS Orchestra.

== Early life ==
Collins was "born in Jackson, Tennessee and brought home to The Bronx (New York) two months later".

Collins spent time as a young girl in Albany, NY, living with her mother in the Arbor Hill district in downtown Albany, where she bought her first guitar.

== Beginnings in music ==
While enrolled in school as a graphic design major in the 1980s, Collins began playing with local musicians in New York City. When playing with a band called The Take, she met and became friends with producer and artist Nile Rodgers. He offered her studio work on various projects. The Thompson Twins invited Collins to play guitar on their world tour in 1985. Collins made her live debut with the band that summer at Live Aid.

Soon after, Collins toured with Al Jarreau, after being featured on his L is for Lover album (1986), on a song called "Pleasure." She quickly found herself an integral part of the Jarreau set. While she was still on tour with Jarreau, Nile Rodgers suggested that she record an album with him and Philippe Saisse, in a trio called Outloud. An album of the same name was released in 1988 on the Warner Bros. label.

== CBS Orchestra ==
As Collins was completing work on Cyndi Lauper's Hat Full of Stars tour in 1993, Paul Shaffer asked that she join the house band for David Letterman's program, which was in the process of moving from NBC to CBS. She accepted and performed with the CBS Orchestra for the entire duration of Letterman's tenure as host of Late Show.

== Other work ==
Collins has toured and recorded with artists such as Madonna, Vonda Shepard, George Clinton, Thompson Twins and P-Funk.

Collins originated and leads the New York City band Felicia Collins & the Life, formerly known as Bitchslapp.

== Musical influences ==
Collins musical influences range from Stevie Wonder, Rufus featuring Chaka Khan, Earth, Wind & Fire, James Brown, Mandrill, Larry LeVan, Jef Lee Johnson, KRS-One, The Roots, Luminous Flux.
