= New York Afternoon =

Studio album by Richie Cole Alto Madness
- Released: 1977
- Recorded: October 13, 1976
- Studio: Blue Rock Studio, NYC
- Genre: Jazz
- Length: 35:51
- Label: Muse; MR 5119
- Producer: Eddie Jefferson for Alto Madness Productions

Richie Cole chronology
Battle of the Saxes (1977)	New York Afternoon (1977)	Alto Madness (1978)

New York Afternoon is an album by saxophonist Richie Cole's Alto Madness recorded in 1976 and released on the Muse label.

== Reception ==
Professional ratings
Review scores
Source	Rating
Allmusic	4/5 stars

Allmusic noted "This Muse album features the group that altoist Richie Cole and the late singer Eddie Jefferson co-led in the mid-'70s. They had a mutually beneficial relationship, with Cole learning from the older vocalist and Jefferson gaining extra exposure from associating with the popular young saxophonist".

== Track listing ==
All compositions by Richie Cole except where noted

1. "Dorothy's Den" – 5:33
2. "Waltz for a Rainy Be Bop Evening" – 5:15
3. "Alto Madness" – 6:10
4. "New York Afternoon" – 4:38
5. "It's the Same Thing Everywhere" – 3:10
6. "Stormy Weather (Trenton Style)" (James P. Johnson) – 6:00
7. "You'll Always Be My Friend" (Vic Juris) – 5:05

== Personnel ==
- Richie Cole – alto saxophone
- Eddie Jefferson – vocals
- Vic Juris – guitar
- Mickey Tucker – piano, electric piano
- Rick Laird – bass, electric bass
- Eddie Gladden – drums
- Ray Mantilla – percussion
