= Paul Shaffer and the World's Most Dangerous Band =

David Letterman's house band for 33 years

- Also known as: Paul Shaffer and the CBS Orchestra (1993–2015)
- Origin: New York City
- Genres: Pop; jazz; big band; comedy
- Years active: 1982–2015, 2017–present
- Members: Paul Shaffer; Will Lee; Sid McGinnis; Anton Fig; Felicia Collins; Tom Malone; Aaron Heick; Frank Greene
- Past members: Steve Jordan; Hiram Bullock; Bernie Worrell; Bruce Kapler; Alan Chez; David Sanborn

Paul Shaffer and the World's Most Dangerous Band is an American musical ensemble led by Paul Shaffer. It was David Letterman's house band for 33 years.

The band formed in 1982 to serve as house band for NBC's Late Night with David Letterman. When Letterman moved to CBS and began hosting the Late Show with David Letterman in 1993, the band added a horn section and second guitarist, renaming itself (due to an intellectual property dispute with NBC) the CBS Orchestra, a name that lasted until Letterman left the Late Show in 2015. After a two-year hiatus, in 2017, the band was revived by Shaffer using its original name and released an album titled Paul Shaffer & The World's Most Dangerous Band, followed by a tour.

== Band name ==
The band was initially unnamed, although in early 1982 it was occasionally jokingly referred to as "The World’s Most Dangerous Band" when closing the show, sometimes alternating it with "Paul Shaffer and the Orchestra," "Paul and the Organization," "Paul Shaffer and the Folks," "Paul Shaffer and the Melody Makers," or a combination: "Paul Shaffer and the World’s Most Dangerous Orchestra." These were all unofficial names, and were dropped by mid-1982; from 1982 to 1987, the group was simply referred to as "Paul Shaffer and the Band" (except for a very brief period in spring 1983 when the band was referred to for several episodes, again unofficially, as "Paul Shaffer and the Party Boys of Rock and Roll").

The 1985 video "You Kill Me" (aired on the David Letterman Holiday Film Festival special) is credited on-screen to "Paul Shaffer and the Band".

In the summer of 1987, the band began to be announced as "Paul Shaffer and the NBC Orchestra," both in on-air conversation and in the show's opening announcements. In on-air conversations between Letterman and Shaffer, Shaffer, when asked which band name he preferred, made it clear that his preference was for "The World’s Most Dangerous Band", feeling that the "NBC Orchestra" name rightly belonged to The Tonight Show band of Doc Severinsen. Accordingly, with the broadcast of September 25, 1987, the band was officially announced as "Paul Shaffer and the World’s Most Dangerous Band," and was always announced with that billing for the rest of Late Night's run (through mid-1993).

The group was forced to rename itself when Letterman left NBC, and NBC claimed that the name "The World's Most Dangerous Band" was its intellectual property. Around this time, the group released an album credited to "Paul Shaffer and the Party Boys of Rock 'n' Roll". The name "Paul Shaffer and The CBS Orchestra" dated from the start of the show on CBS in 1993. The band was not featured on CBS programming outside of the Late Show. According to the Late Show with David Letterman credits, the name "CBS Orchestra" is the property of CBS; CBS had not had an orchestra since The Ed Sullivan Show (whose house band absorbed most of the Alfredo Antonini-led CBS Orchestra that had served as the CBS Radio Network's primary band during its existence) ended its run in 1971.

When the band reassembled after the end of Late Show in 2016, it was able to reclaim its former name, "The World's Most Dangerous Band", as NBC had not used the name for several years and thus had abandoned any trademark claim over it.

== Beyond Late Show ==
Besides being the house band for the Late Show, the group has also been the house band for the Rock and Roll Hall of Fame induction ceremonies since 1986 and continued in this role for the 2015, award ceremony, which was held April 18, 2015, but aired on HBO several days after the finale of the Late Show with David Letterman. In 1999, the group was the back-up band for the Concert of the Century at the White House. In 2001, they also served as the backup band for The Concert for New York City, where they performed with David Bowie, Mick Jagger and Keith Richards, Eric Clapton and Buddy Guy, Macy Gray and James Taylor.

== After Letterman ==
The orchestra disbanded after the Late Show ended on May 20, 2015. Jazz musician Jon Batiste was announced by new host Stephen Colbert as the new Late Show's bandleader on June 4, 2015, with his band, Stay Human, becoming the show's new house band.

The World's Most Dangerous Band reassembled in 2016 in order to record a self-titled album, released on March 17, 2017, followed by a tour.

The group performed as the house band for the Grammy Awards Premiere Ceremony in 2018.

The group, without Sid McGinnis, performed as the guest house band for The Tonight Show Starring Jimmy Fallon on February 3, 2023, subbing for The Roots, who traveled to Los Angeles for that weekend's Grammys. This occurred two days after the 41st anniversary of Late Night with David Letterman and marked the band's first full appearance on NBC since Late Night ended in 1993. Shaffer reappeared on The Tonight Show on December 18, 2024, as a member of Little Steven and the Disciples of Soul, reviving Shaffer's tradition of backing Darlene Love on "Christmas (Baby Please Come Home)." They returned to the Tonight Show for a week in February 2025, again without McGinnis, when The Roots took a week off to rehearse for Saturday Night Live's 50th anniversary special.

== Membership ==
The original membership of "The World's Most Dangerous Band" was assembled in early 1982 and consisted of Paul Shaffer (keyboards); Will Lee (bass); Hiram Bullock (guitar) and Steve Jordan (drums). Lee, Bullock and Jordan were all previously members of The 24th Street Band, a jazz/rock fusion ensemble that released three albums in the late 1970s. The fourth member of the 24th Street Band was keyboard player Clifford Carter. Shaffer was a regular attendee at their shows and had worked with Lee as a session musician. When it came time to create a band for Late Night, Shaffer simply recruited the three non-keyboard-playing members of the 24th Street Band, in essence hiring a ready-made supporting band for himself.

Bullock dropped out of the band around the end of 1983. Shaffer had met guitarist Sid McGinnis in 1978; McGinnis became a permanent member of the group, replacing Bullock, in 1984. Jordan was the second to exit, in 1986, and was replaced by Anton Fig, who had been the backup drummer for Kiss in the late 1970s. Shaffer and Fig had first played together at a Joan Armatrading recording session in March 1980. From the mid-1980s through 1993, saxophone player David Sanborn was a frequent guest player, usually sitting in with the band on Thursday or Friday nights. Sanborn was originally intended to be a permanent band member.

During the interregnum between the end of Late Night on NBC and the beginning of Late Show on CBS, being unable to use the name "The World's Most Dangerous Band" due to an intellectual property claim by NBC, the band released an album, The World's Most Dangerous Party, under the name "Paul Shaffer and the Party Boys of Rock 'n Roll".

When Letterman moved to CBS to host the Late Show in 1993, the band came along, renaming itself, with CBS's blessing, "Paul Shaffer and the CBS Orchestra", and was greatly expanded. Felicia Collins was added as a second guitarist and eventually a vocalist (over the course of the show, she occasionally shared top billing with Shaffer, as "Paul Shaffer, Felicia Collins and the CBS Orchestra"); she had first performed with Lee in 1985 when they backed the Thompson Twins at Live Aid in Philadelphia. Two years later, she and Shaffer had first performed together at a benefit concert for homeless children, hosted by Paul Simon. A contract stipulation with previous producer Johnny Carson prohibited the World's Most Dangerous Band from having a horn section, so as not to emulate the NBC Orchestra seen on The Tonight Show. With Carson's retirement and the change of network, the stipulation was no longer in effect, and Shaffer was now free to add horns. Initially he did not do so, instead using a lead synthesizer operated by Bernie Worrell; Worrell departed after two months, and a horn section was added. The band added trombonist Tom Malone and saxophonist Bruce Kapler. Trumpeter Alan Chez https://no.wikipedia.org/w/index.php?title=Spesial:Siteringshjelp&page=Al_Cheznovitz&id=25608105&wpFormIdentifier=titleform#Chicago-stil Bonjovi, tower of power was added in February 1997. Alan Chez and Bruce Kapler appeared many times on Late night with David Letterman on NBC as well as WMDB road shows. Shaffer and trombonist Malone had first worked together in 1975, as original members of the Saturday Night Live Band; they had also helped organize the original Blues Brothers in 1978. Kapler and Chez occasionally sat in with the World's Most Dangerous Band starting in 1988.

Following Bruce Kapler's departure from the CBS Orchestra, saxophonist Aaron Heick eventually became Kapler's permanent replacement. Heick was the most frequent substitute during the roughly seven-month transition period between permanent saxophonists. He can be heard alongside Will Lee on the 2008 Terry Silverlight album Diamond in the Riff. In addition, a frequent substitute for Anton Fig, Shawn Pelton (of Saturday Night Live fame), had been the drummer on Heick's own 2009 debut album, Daylight and Darkness. Al Chez would leave the band in 2012 and be replaced by trumpeter Frank Greene, who like Tom Malone, is an alumnus of the famed One O'Clock Lab Band at the North Texas State University.

=== The World's Most Dangerous Band ===
- Paul Shaffer on keyboards (1982–1993)
- Will Lee on bass guitar and vocals (1982–1993)
- Steve Jordan on drums and percussion (1982–1986)
- Hiram Bullock on guitar (1982–1984)
- Sid McGinnis on guitar (1984–1993)
- Anton Fig on drums and percussion (1986–1993)

=== Final CBS Orchestra members ===
- Paul Shaffer on keyboards, harmonica and vocals (August 1993–May 2015)
- Anton Fig on drums and percussion (August 1993–May 2015)
- Felicia Collins on guitar, vocals, and percussion (August 1993–May 2015)
- Sid McGinnis on guitar, pedal steel guitar and vocals (August 1993–May 2015)
- Will Lee on bass guitar and vocals (August 1993–May 2015)
- Tom "Bones" Malone on trombone, trumpet, saxophone, piccolo and percussion (November 1993–May 2015)
- Aaron Heick on saxophone (August 2012–May 2015)
- Frank Greene on trumpet and percussion (August 2012–May 2015)

==== Former ====
- Bernie Worrell on synthesizers (August 1993–November 1993)
- Bruce Kapler on saxophone, flute, and vocals (November 1993–February 2012)
- Alan Chez on trumpet, vocals, and percussion (February 1997–July 2012)

=== Paul Shaffer & the World's Most Dangerous Band (2017–2018 & 2023–2025 revivals) ===
- Paul Shaffer on keyboards and vocals
- Felicia Collins on guitar and vocals
- Anton Fig on drums
- Will Lee on bass and vocals
- Sid McGinnis on guitar (2017-2018 only)
- Tom Malone on horns
- Frank Greene on horns
- Aaron Heick on horns

=== Guest members ===
When Paul Shaffer was unavailable, Warren Zevon was usually the substitute bandleader prior to his final appearance on the program in 2002 and his death a year later. On October 13, 2005, Booker T. Jones filled in for Shaffer, and Anton Fig was bandleader. Jeff Kazee also filled in for Paul on occasion after Zevon's death. Michael Bearden infrequently substituted for Shaffer as a keyboardist, with drummer Fig taking on the role of bandleader. However, this was before Bearden was named the bandleader on George Lopez's ill-fated TBS talk show, Lopez Tonight. For the April 6, 2001, show, the band expanded to 50 players to become the CBS Giant Orchestra with 16 violins, 8 violas, 4 cellos, 3 trumpets, 2 trombones, 1 bass trombone, 4 saxophones, 2 harps, 1 keyboard and 1 percussionist.

Phil Collins played drums with Steve Jordan in the band when he was a guest on the Letterman show on March 26, 1985. Eddie Van Halen also performed guitar for the band on a 1985 episode taped in Los Angeles. Drummer Shawn Pelton of the Saturday Night Live Band sits in on the drums when Anton Fig is absent.

On the June 15, 2010, episode, bassist Larry Graham of Sly and The Family Stone and Graham Central Station was a guest of the band, playing bass and providing vocals. Graham also sat in on October 8, 2012. New York area bassist Neil Jason often fills in for Will Lee, most recently on August 21, 2012.

Saxophonist Lou Marini made several guest appearances on the show during the '80s and '90s.

David Sanborn on saxophone was an occasional guest member of the band during its NBC days. In February 2012, after longtime saxophonist Bruce Kapler departed the orchestra, a string of guest saxophonists (including Tom Timko of Will Lee's Beatles tribute band The Fab Faux) substituted for him until one of the substitutes (Aaron Heick) was named the permanent replacement. During the week of August 13, 2012, trumpeter Greg Adams from Tower of Power sat in with the band.

== Discography ==
=== Albums ===
The band has released three albums:

- 1988: Paul Shaffer, Coast to Coast (Capitol Records) (Contains the Late Night with David Letterman theme song "Late Night")
- 1993: Paul Shaffer & the Party Boys of Rock 'n' Roll, The World's Most Dangerous Party (SBK Records, Capitol Records)
- 2017: Paul Shaffer & The World's Most Dangerous Band (Sire Records/Rhino Records)

=== Singles ===
- "What is Soul"
- "You Kill Me"
- "When The Radio is On"
- "Happy Street"

Among the most famous songs of the band are also the covers of the classic songs "Louie Louie" and "Wang Dang Doodle" and the original theme song for Late Night with David Letterman.

== See also ==
- Louis Cato and the Great Big Joy Machine, formerly Louis Cato and The Late Show Band during Stephen Colbert's tenure
