= Doors (album) =

Studio album by Eric Kloss
- Released: April 1972
- Recorded: January 1, 1972; New York City
- Genre: Jazz
- Length: 35:40
- Label: Cobblestone; CST 9006
- Producer: Don Schlitten

Eric Kloss chronology
Consciousness! (1970)	Doors (1972)	One, Two, Free (1972)

Doors is an album by saxophonist Eric Kloss which was recorded in 1972 and first released on the Cobblestone label.

== Reception ==
Professional ratings
Review scores
Source	Rating
AllMusic	3/5 stars

AllMusic awarded the album 3 stars.

== Track listing ==
All compositions by Eric Kloss.

1. "Doors" - 7:28
2. "Waves" - 7:02
3. "Quasar" - 4:28
4. "Sweatin' It" - 4:59
5. "Love" - 4:55
6. "Libra" - 6:48

== Personnel ==
- Eric Kloss - alto saxophone, tenor saxophone
- Neal Creque - piano, electric piano
- Gene Taylor - bass
- Ron Krasinski - drums, tambourine
