= Life Force (album) =

Studio album by Eric Kloss
- Released: April 1968
- Recorded: September 18, 1967; New York City
- Genre: Jazz
- Label: Prestige; PR 7535
- Producer: Don Schlitten

Eric Kloss chronology
First Class Kloss! (1967)	Life Force (1968)	We're Goin' Up (1968)

Life Force is a studio album by saxophonist Eric Kloss. It was recorded in 1967 and released in 1968 on Prestige Records.

== Reception ==
Professional ratings
Review scores
Source	Rating
AllMusic	4/5 stars
The Rolling Stone Jazz Record Guide	3/5 stars

AllMusic awarded the album 4 stars.

== Track listing ==
All compositions by Eric Kloss, except as indicated.

1. "Soul Daddy" - 4:05
2. "You're Turning My Dreams Around" - 4:56
3. "Life Force" - 11:46
4. "Nocturno" - 6:38
5. "St. Thomas" (Sonny Rollins) - 5:24
6. "My Heart Is In The Highlands" - 8:48

== Personnel ==
- Eric Kloss - alto saxophone
- Jimmy Owens - trumpet, flugelhorn
- Pat Martino - guitar
- Ben Tucker - bass
- Alan Dawson - drums
