= Keeper of the Flame (Richie Cole album) =

Studio album by Richie Cole
- Released: 1979
- Recorded: September 6, 1978
- Studio: Van Gelder Studio, Englewood Cliffs, NJ
- Genre: Jazz
- Label: Muse; MR 5192
- Producer: Mitch Farber

Richie Cole chronology
Alto Madness (1978)	Keeper of the Flame (1979)	Hollywood Madness (1980)

Keeper of the Flame is an album by saxophonist Richie Cole recorded in 1978 and released on the Muse label.

== Reception ==
Professional ratings
Review scores
Source	Rating
Allmusic	4.5/5 stars

Allmusic noted "This is one of altoist Richie Cole's best-ever albums".

== Track listing ==
All compositions by Richie Cole except where noted

1. "As Time Goes By" (Herman Hupfeld) – 6:59
2. "I Can't Get Started" (Vernon Duke, Ira Gershwin) – 4:51
3. "Keeper of the Flame" – 6:09
4. "Harolds House of Jazz" (Cole, David Lahm) – 4:58
5. "Holiday for Strings" (David Rose) – 5:45
6. "New York Afternoon" – 3:59
7. "Strange Groove" – 4:57

== Personnel ==
- Richie Cole – alto saxophone
- Vic Juris – guitar
- Harold Mabern – piano
- Rick Laird – bass
- Eddie Gladden – drums
- Eddie Jefferson (tracks 4 & 6), The Alt-Tettes (track 7) – vocals
