= First Class Kloss! =

Studio album by Eric Kloss
- Released: November 1967
- Recorded: July 14, 1967; New York City
- Genre: Jazz
- Label: Prestige; PR 7520
- Producer: Don Schlitten

Eric Kloss chronology
Grits & Gravy (1966)	First Class Kloss! (1967)	Life Force (1967)

First Class Kloss! is an album by saxophonist Eric Kloss which was recorded in 1967 and released on the Prestige label.

== Reception ==
Professional ratings
Review scores
Source	Rating
AllMusic	4/5 stars
The Rolling Stone Jazz Record Guide	3/5 stars

Allmusic awarded the album 4 stars.

== Track listing ==
All compositions by Eric Kloss, except as indicated

1. "Comin' Home Baby" (Bob Dorough, Ben Tucker) - 2:39
2. "The Chasin' Game" - 7:00
3. "One for Marianne" - 6:42
4. "Chitlins con Carne" (Kenny Burrell) - 2:51
5. "Walkin'" (Richard Carpenter) - 5:24
6. "African Cookbook" (Randy Weston) - 6:47

== Personnel ==
- Eric Kloss - alto saxophone, tenor saxophone
- Jimmy Owens - trumpet
- Cedar Walton - piano
- Leroy Vinnegar - bass
- Alan Dawson - drums
