= Bruce Kapler =

- Occupations: Musician, multi-instrumentalist, vocalist, arranger, producer, composer
- Years active: 1970s–present
- Known for: Member of the CBS Orchestra on Late Show with David Letterman (1993–2012)
- Children: 1
- Musical career
- Genres: Various (jazz, rock, R&B, pop, etc.)
- Website: https://brucekapler.com/

Bruce Kapler is an American musician. He was a member of the CBS Orchestra on Late Show with David Letterman from 1993 to 2012. He sings and plays several instruments including soprano, alto, tenor, baritone and bass saxophone, flute, clarinet, recorder, keyboards, guitar, and percussion.

== Biography ==
Bruce Kapler grew up in a household where his parents played a wide variety of music on the family Victrola hi-fi, exposing him to an eclectic mix ranging from operatic recordings by Mario Lanza and honky-tonk piano to comedic tracks by Jerry Lewis and the Broadway soundtrack from Camelot.

Kapler began studying music at the age of five, starting with recorder lessons under Jerry Petrie, a Juilliard-affiliated instructor who introduced him to sight-transposition and advanced concepts early on. By elementary school, he had a significant advantage over peers new to instruments. He credits an influential elementary school music teacher, Jack Carmen—a trombonist and clarinetist passionate about Dixieland—who shared gig stories that inspired Kapler's desire to pursue music professionally. His first public performance came around age nine in a fourth-grade school band concert.

=== Early career ===
After high school, Kapler toured nationally for about 2 and a half years with a Vegas-style show band recommended by a high school friend. The group traveled in a large green truck, performing lounge acts in hotels—including a stint at the old Stardust in Las Vegas—with coordinated outfits, choreography, and a mix of musical styles. This period marked his first road experience and steady income from music, though the travel proved challenging.

In 1976, during the U.S. Bicentennial, Kapler moved to a loft on the Lower East Side of Manhattan with friends to pursue his career amid the "starving artist" lifestyle. At the time, the neighborhood was rough and dangerous, far different from its later gentrified state filled with clubs and restaurants.

During this era, Kapler also worked as a record producer. He produced a single for an artist that sold to Mercury Records and later handled pet projects for a successful record company, gaining experience in top studios with notable engineers and producers.

=== Association with David Letterman ===
Kapler's connection to David Letterman began in 1988 on NBC's Late Night with David Letterman, where he appeared as an added musician and arranger on about 30 episodes. He earned an Emmy nomination in 1992 for Outstanding Achievement in Music Direction for arranging the show's tenth anniversary primetime special at Radio City Music Hall.

His path to the CBS Orchestra formed through connections with band members like bassist Will Lee and trumpeter Al Chez, whom he played with in a Latin funk band. After Paul Shaffer heard them backing La Toya Jackson, Kapler was invited to rehearsals and contributed horn arrangements. When the show transitioned to CBS in 1993, Kapler initially pitched himself as a multi-instrumental utility player (saxophones, flute, clarinet, recorder, keyboards, guitar, percussion, and vocals). Although Shaffer initially planned a different direction, Kapler was called back for guest spots starting with Natalie Cole, gradually becoming a regular over several months as the band incorporated more horns and David Letterman favored the sound.

He officially joined on November 1, 1993, serving until February 2012. Kapler described the gig as the "absolute best job that any musician could ever have," praising Letterman's influence as a cultural voice.

=== Collaborations and other work ===
Kapler has performed and recorded with numerous artists, including Ray Charles, Aretha Franklin, Stevie Wonder, James Brown, Chuck Berry, B.B. King, Paul Anka, Tony Bennett, Natalie Cole, Harry Connick Jr., George Benson, Buckwheat Zydeco, Glen Campbell, 50 Cent, Busta Rhymes, Dave Matthews Band, Randy Newman, Brian Wilson, and Levon Helm (with whom he played at Midnight Rambles).
