= Sky Shadows =

Studio album by Eric Kloss
- Released: 1968
- Recorded: August 13, 1968; New York City
- Genre: Jazz
- Label: Prestige; PR 7594
- Producer: Don Schlitten

Eric Kloss chronology
We're Goin' Up (1967)	Sky Shadows (1968)	In the Land of the Giants (1968)

Sky Shadows is an album by saxophonist Eric Kloss which was recorded in 1968 and released on the Prestige label.

== Reception ==
Professional ratings
Review scores
Source	Rating
AllMusic	3/5 stars
The Rolling Stone Jazz Record Guide	4/5 stars

AllMusic stated: "This 1968 release from saxophonist Eric Kloss has many fine points and a couple of puzzling technical lapses. Kloss, heard on alto and tenor, is definitely one of the strengths. Only 19 at the time of this session, the young sax player is well up to the challenge of playing with his more seasoned bandmates".

== Track listing ==
All compositions by Eric Kloss except as indicated

1. "In a Country Soul Garden" - 6:23
2. "Sky Shadows" (Pat Martino) - 13:16
3. "The Girl With the Fall in Her Hair" - 6:43
4. "I'll Give You Everything" - 6:41
5. "January's Child" - 7:07

== Personnel ==
- Eric Kloss - alto saxophone, tenor saxophone
- Jaki Byard - piano
- Pat Martino - guitar
- Bob Cranshaw - bass
- Jack DeJohnette - drums
