= Love and All That Jazz =

Studio album by Eric Kloss with Don Patterson and Groove Holmes
- Released: 1966
- Recorded: March 14 and April 11, 1966
- Studio: Van Gelder Studio, Englewood Cliffs, New Jersey
- Genre: Jazz
- Label: Prestige; PR 7469
- Producer: Cal Lampley

Eric Kloss chronology
Introducing Eric Kloss (1965)	Love and All That Jazz (1966)	Grits & Gravy (1966)

Love and All That Jazz is a studio album by saxophonist Eric Kloss. It was recorded in 1966 and released on Prestige Records.

== Reception ==
Professional ratings
Review scores
Source	Rating
AllMusic	4/5 stars

AllMusic stated: "Eric Kloss was only 17 when he recorded his second Prestige LP, Love and All That Jazz, in 1966. At that age, most jazz musicians are lucky to be featured on an album as sideman, let alone record as a leader and have a contract with an independent label of Prestige's stature... Although Kloss was still a teenager in 1966, there is nothing adolescent about Love and All That Jazz".

== Track listing ==
1. "You'd Be So Nice to Come Home To" (Cole Porter) - 4:50
2. "Just for Fun-K" (Eric Kloss) - 5:50
3. "The Shadow of Your Smile" (Johnny Mandel, Paul Francis Webster) - 3:00
4. "No Blues" (Miles Davis) - 5:15
5. "Love for Sale" (Porter) - 7:37
6. "I'm Glad There Is You" (Jimmy Dorsey, Paul Mertz) - 5:10
7. "Gemini" (Jimmy Heath) - 6:06
- Recorded at Van Gelder Studio in Englewood Cliffs, New Jersey on March 14 (tracks 3 & 7) and April 11 (tracks 1, 2, 4–6), 1966

== Personnel ==
- Eric Kloss - alto saxophone, tenor saxophone
- Don Patterson (tracks 1, 2, 4–6), Richard Groove Holmes (tracks 3 & 7) - organ
- Vinnie Corrao (tracks 1, 2, 4–6), Gene Edwards (tracks 3 & 7) - guitar
- Billy James (tracks 1, 2, 4–6), Grady Tate (tracks 3 & 7) - drums
