= To Hear Is to See! =

Studio album by Eric Kloss
- Released: February 1970
- Recorded: July 22, 1969
- Studio: New York City
- Genre: Jazz
- Label: Prestige; PR 7689
- Producer: Don Schlitten

Eric Kloss chronology
In the Land of the Giants (1968)	To Hear Is to See! (1970)	Consciousness! (1970)

To Hear Is to See! is an album by saxophonist Eric Kloss with pianist Chick Corea, Dave Holland and drummer Jack DeJohnette, recorded on July 22, 1969, and released on Prestige the following year.

== Reception ==
Professional ratings
Review scores
Source	Rating
AllMusic	4.5/5 stars
The Rolling Stone Jazz Record Guide	4/5 stars

AllMusic awarded the album 4½ stars.

== Track listing ==
All tracks are written by Eric Kloss.

Side one
No.	Title	Length
1.	"To Hear Is to See"	5:32
2.	"The Kingdom Within"	6:01
3.	"Stone Groove"	6:58

Side two
No.	Title	Length
1.	"Children of the Morning"	8:27
2.	"Cynara"	9:35

== Personnel ==
- Eric Kloss – alto saxophone, tenor saxophone
- Chick Corea – piano, electric piano
- Dave Holland – bass
- Jack DeJohnette – drums
