= Bodies' Warmth =

Studio album by Eric Kloss
- Released: 1975
- Recorded: June 24 & 25, 1975; Venture Sound, Somerville, New Jersey
- Genre: Jazz
- Length: 41:51
- Label: Muse; MR 5077
- Producer: Michael Cuscuna

Eric Kloss chronology
Essence (1973)	Bodies' Warmth (1975)	Battle of the Saxes (1976)

Bodies' Warmth is an album by saxophonist Eric Kloss which was recorded in 1975 and released on the Muse label.

== Reception ==
Professional ratings
Review scores
Source	Rating
AllMusic	2.5/5 stars
The Rolling Stone Jazz Record Guide	2/5 stars

AllMusic awarded the album 2½ stars.

== Track listing ==
All compositions by Eric Kloss, except as indicated.

1. "Lady" - 3:20
2. "Joni" - 7:01
3. "Bodies' Warmth" - 11:55
4. "Scarborough Fair" (Paul Simon, Art Garfunkel) - 2:58
5. "Mystique" - 5:22
6. "Headin' Out" - 9:46

== Personnel ==
- Eric Kloss - alto saxophone
- Barry Miles - piano, electric piano, synthesizer
- Vic Juris - guitar
- Harvie Swartz - electric bass
- Terry Silverlight - drums
