= Roadsong (album) =

Studio album by Vic Juris
- Released: 1978
- Recorded: September 19 & 21, 1977
- Studio: Van Gelder Studio, Englewood Cliffs, NJ
- Genre: Jazz
- Length: 40:36
- Label: Muse; MR 5150
- Producer: Richie Cole

Vic Juris chronology
Roadsong (1978)	Horizon Drive (1979)

Roadsong is an album by guitarist Vic Juris recorded in 1977 and released on the Muse label.

== Reception ==
Professional ratings
Review scores
Source	Rating
AllMusic	4/5 stars

AllMusic awarded the album 4 stars with its review by Scott Yanow noting that "guitarist Vic Juris performs fusion-oriented music during this recording...despite some fiery solos from the leader, the overall results are not particularly memorable and sound very much of the period".

== Track listing ==
All compositions by Vic Juris except where noted

1. "Roadsong" (Wes Montgomery) – 5:47
2. "Portabelo Market" – 7:23
3. "Leah" – 4:45
4. "Vic's Theme" (Terry Silverlight) – 3:27
5. "In Between" – 4:01
6. "One for Sonny" – 4:52
7. "Free Bird" – 4:53
8. "Two Lovely People" – 5:28

== Personnel ==
- Vic Juris – guitar
- Richie Cole – alto saxophone (tracks 5 & 9)
- Barry Miles – keyboards
- Rick Laird (tracks 1, 2 & 4–8), Jon Burr (track 3) – bass
- Terry Silverlight – drums
