= Consciousness! (Eric Kloss album) =

Studio album by Eric Kloss
- Released: 1970
- Recorded: January 6, 1970
- Studio: New York City
- Genre: Post-bop, jazz fusion
- Length: 42:17
- Label: Prestige; PR 7793
- Producer: Don Schlitten

Eric Kloss chronology
To Hear Is to See! (1969)	Consciousness! (1970)	Doors (1972)

Consciousness! is an album by saxophonist Eric Kloss with guitarist Pat Martino and rhythm section Chick Corea, Dave Holland and Jack DeJohnette which was recorded on January 6, 1970 and released on Prestige later that same year. Kloss had recorded his previous album, To Hear Is to See!, six months previously with the same rhythm section.

== Reception ==
Professional ratings
Review scores
Source	Rating
AllMusic	4.5/5 stars
The Rolling Stone Jazz Record Guide	4/5 stars

AllMusic awarded the album 4½ stars.

== Track listing ==
Side one
No.	Title	Writer(s)	Length
1.	"Sunshine Superman"	Donovan	10:14
2.	"Kay"	Eric Kloss	10:24

Side two
No.	Title	Writer(s)	Length
1.	"Outward Wisdom"	Pat Martino	6:05
2.	"Songs to Aging Children"	Joni Mitchell	6:58
3.	"Consciousness"	Don DePaolis; Kloss	8:36

== Personnel ==
- Eric Kloss – alto saxophone, tenor saxophone
- Pat Martino – guitar
- Chick Corea – piano, electric piano
- Dave Holland – bass
- Jack DeJohnette – drums
