= We're Goin' Up =

Studio album by Eric Kloss
- Released: 1968
- Recorded: December 22, 1967; New York City
- Genre: Jazz
- Label: Prestige; PR 7565
- Producer: Don Schlitten

Eric Kloss chronology
Life Force (1967)	We're Goin' Up (1968)	Sky Shadows (1968)

We're Goin' Up is an album by saxophonist Eric Kloss which was recorded in 1968 and released on the Prestige label.

== Reception ==
Professional ratings
Review scores
Source	Rating
AllMusic	3/5 stars

Allmusic awarded the album 3 stars.

== Track listing ==
1. "Get the Money Bluze" - 2:33
2. "I Long to Belong to You" - 6:48
3. "Gentle Is My Lover" - 7:51
4. "We´re Goin' Up" - 5:34
5. "Of Wine and You" - 6:06
6. "Blues Up Tight" - 5:53

== Personnel ==
- Eric Kloss - alto saxophone, tenor saxophone
- Jimmy Owens - trumpet, Flugelhorn
- Kenny Barron - piano
- Bob Cranshaw - bass
- Alan Dawson - drums
