= Still on the Planet =

Studio album by Eddie Jefferson
- Released: 1976
- Recorded: March 17, 1976
- Studio: Blue Rock Studios, NYC
- Genre: Jazz
- Label: Muse MR 5063
- Producer: Bob Porter

Eddie Jefferson chronology
Things Are Getting Better (1974)	Still on the Planet (1976)	The Live-liest (1976)

Still on the Planet (also released as Godfather of Vocalese) is an album by vocalist Eddie Jefferson recorded in 1976 and released on the Muse label.

== Reception ==
Professional ratings
Review scores
Source	Rating
AllMusic	4.5/5 stars

In his review for AllMusic, Scott Yanow stated: "The innovative scat singer and vocalese lyricist was having a comeback during his final years, teaming up with altoist Richie Cole for spirited performances."

== Track listing ==
1. "I Got the Blues" (Lester Young, Eddie Jefferson) – 5:33
2. "Workshop (Blues for a Debutante)" (Jefferson) – 2:57
3. "Sherry" (Hank Crawford, Jefferson) – 3:20
4. "Ornithology" (Charlie Parker, Benny Harris, Jefferson) – 8:17
5. "Keep Walkin'" (Celia Ferguson, Jefferson) – 5:38
6. "Zap! Carnivorous" (Mickey Tucker, Jefferson) – 6:19
7. "Pinetop's Boogie" (Pinetop Smith, Jefferson) – 3:17
8. "Chameleon" (Herbie Hancock, Paul Jackson, Bennie Maupin, Harvey Mason, Jefferson) – 4:32
9. "Chameleon" [alternate take] (Hancock, Jackson, Maupin, Mason, Jefferson) – 5:07 Additional track on CD release

== Personnel ==
- Eddie Jefferson – vocals
- Waymon Reed – trumpet, flugelhorn
- Richie Cole – alto saxophone
- Mickey Tucker – keyboards
- Rick Laird – bass
- Eddie Gladden – drums
