= The World's Most Dangerous Party =

Studio album by Paul Shaffer and the Party Boys of Rock 'n' Roll
- Released: 1993
- Genre: Rock
- Label: Capitol
- Producer: Todd Rundgren

The World's Most Dangerous Party is Paul Shaffer's second album, released as a double CD in July 1993. Assembled as if Shaffer and his band were playing live at a house party, the album features the contributions of many celebrities and recording artists like David Letterman, Tony Bennett, George Clinton, Joan Jett, Phil Spector, Mike Myers, Dana Carvey, Jon Lovitz, Richard Belzer and Joe Walsh. As the 'live' music plays, these celebrities are generally heard talking amongst themselves and with Paul, as though amidst happy chattering at a crowded party.

All songs on the album are covers and most are instrumental, similar to the versions played by Shaffer and his band on David Letterman's late night talk shows. It was produced, engineered, and mixed by Todd Rundgren, with assistant engineering by Mike Thompson at The Hit Factory recording studio.

Shaffer's band was billed as "The Party Boys of Rock 'n' Roll", as NBC held a trademark on the moniker "World's Most Dangerous Band". CBS, where the band would land later that year along with Letterman, also held the trademark on the next name the band would use, the "CBS Orchestra".

== Track listing ==
=== Disc 1 ===
1. "Doing It to Death" (Intro) (1:15)
2. "Something About You" (3:02)
3. "I Was Made to Love Her" (3:48)
4. "Burning Down the House" (4:28)
5. "Mysterious Ways" (4:02)
6. "Inner City Blues (Make Me Wanna Holler)" (3:56)
7. "Black Dog" (4:31)
8. "Doing It to Death" (6:35)
9. "Middle of the Road" (3:58)
10. "Don't Dream It's Over" (4:37)
11. "Could You Be Loved" (4:33)

=== Disc 2 ===
1. "Chest Fever" (3:55)
2. "1999" (5:01)
3. "Jamp" (6:44)
4. "Fantasy" (4:22)
5. "(Not Just) Knee Deep" (4:31)
6. "Don't Bring Me Down" (5:00)
7. "You Shook Me All Night Long" (3:34)
8. "Beds are Burning" (4:33)
9. "I Can't Make You Love Me" (4:04)
10. Medley: "Time Is Tight/Hip Hug-Her/Green Onions/Dance to the Music" (9:35)
11. "Dance to the Music" (3:15)
