= Celebration (Eric Kloss album) =

Studio album by Eric Kloss
- Released: 1980
- Recorded: January 6 & 7, 1979; Dimensional Sound Studio, NYC
- Genre: Jazz
- Label: Muse; MR 5196
- Producer: Michael Cuscuna

Eric Kloss chronology
Now (1978)	Celebration (1980)	Sweet Connections (1979)

Celebration is an album by saxophonist Eric Kloss recorded in 1979 and released on the Muse label.

== Reception ==
Professional ratings
Review scores
Source	Rating
AllMusic	3/5 stars
The Rolling Stone Jazz Record Guide	2/5 stars

The AllMusic review stated: "The playing is on a high level and the compositions are complex, but the overall music (other than the opening "Celebration") tends to be a bit dull".

== Track listing ==
All compositions by Eric Kloss, except as indicated.

1. "Celebration" - 6:53
2. "The Force" - 10:07
3. "Afterglow" - 5:12
4. "Heavy Connections" - 6:06
5. "The Samba Express" (Barry Miles) - 7:52
6. "Blue Delhi" - 7:46

== Personnel ==
- Eric Kloss - alto saxophone, tenor saxophone
- Barry Miles - piano, electric piano, synthesizer
- Kenny Karsh - guitar
- Mike Richmond - bass, electric bass
- Terry Silverlight - drums
