= Perugia (album) =

Live album by Roland Hanna
- Released: 1975
- Recorded: July 2, 1974
- Venue: Montreux Jazz Festival, Switzerland
- Genre: Jazz
- Label: Freedom; FLP 41010
- Producer: Alan Bates

Roland Hanna chronology
The New Heritage Keyboard Quartet (1974)	Perugia (1975)	Informal Solo (1974)

Perugia (subtitled Recorded Live at the Montreux Jazz Festival) is a live album by pianist Roland Hanna featuring a solo performance recorded at the 1974 Montreux Jazz Festival in Switzerland and released by the Freedom label.

== Reception ==
Professional ratings
Review scores
Source	Rating
AllMusic	4.5/5 stars

AllMusic reviewer Ron Wynn stated: "Excellent piano solos -- some of Hanna's sharpest".

== Track listing ==
All compositions by Roland Hanna, except where indicated.

1. "Take the "A" Train" (Billy Strayhorn) – 6:14
2. "I Got It Bad (and That Ain't Good)" (Duke Ellington, Paul Francis Webster) – 7:31
3. "Time Dust Gathered" – 6:22
4. "Perugia" – 8:12
5. "A Child Is Born" (Thad Jones) – 5:40
6. "Wistful Moment" – 7:13

== Personnel ==
- Roland Hanna – piano
