= Together (Eric Kloss and Barry Miles album) =

Studio album by Eric Kloss and Barry Miles
- Released: 1977
- Recorded: July 19 & 20, 1976; VCI Recording, NYC
- Genre: Jazz
- Label: Muse; MR 5112
- Producer: Barry Miles and Eric Kloss

Eric Kloss chronology
Battle of the Saxes (1976)	Together (1977)	Now (1978)

Together is an album by saxophonist Eric Kloss which features pianist Barry Miles and was recorded in 1976 and released on the Muse label.

== Reception ==
Professional ratings
Review scores
Source	Rating
AllMusic	2.5/5 stars
The Rolling Stone Jazz Record Guide	2/5 stars

AllMusic awarded the album 2½ stars.

== Track listing ==
All compositions by Eric Kloss, except as indicated.

1. "Relay" (Barry Miles) - 6:58
2. "The Wise Woman" - 6:24
3. "Together" (Kloss, Miles) - 6:09
4. "Song for a Mountain" (Miles) - 4:19
5. "The Goddess, the Gypsy & the Light" - 13:05
6. "Opus De Mulier" - 1:55

== Personnel ==
- Eric Kloss - alto saxophone, tenor saxophone
- Barry Miles - piano, electric piano, synthesizer
