= In the Land of the Giants =

Studio album by Eric Kloss
- Released: July 1969
- Recorded: January 2, 1969; New York City
- Genre: Jazz
- Label: Prestige; PR 7627
- Producer: Don Schlitten

Eric Kloss chronology
Sky Shadows (1968)	In the Land of the Giants (1969)	To Hear Is to See! (1969)

In the Land of the Giants is an album by saxophonist Eric Kloss which was recorded in 1968 and released on the Prestige label.

== Reception ==
Professional ratings
Review scores
Source	Rating
AllMusic	4/5 stars
The Rolling Stone Jazz Record Guide	5/5 stars

AllMusic reviewer Scott Yanow stated: "A superior post-bop altoist, the blind Kloss showed that he was able to hold his own with musicians much better-known than himself".

== Track listing ==
All compositions by Eric Kloss, except as indicated

1. "Summertime" (George Gershwin, Ira Gershwin, DuBose Heyward) - 7:31
2. "So What" (Miles Davis) - 11:01
3. "Sock It to Me Socrates" - 5:14
4. "When Two Lovers Touch" - 5:14
5. "Things Ain't What They Used to Be" (Mercer Ellington, Ted Persons) - 5:33

== Personnel ==
- Eric Kloss - alto saxophone
- Booker Ervin - tenor saxophone
- Jaki Byard - piano
- Richard Davis - bass
- Alan Dawson - drums
