= Things Are Getting Better (Eddie Jefferson album) =

Studio album by Eddie Jefferson
- Released: 1974
- Recorded: March 5, 1974
- Genre: Jazz
- Length: 36:26
- Label: Muse MR 5043
- Producer: Don Schlitten

Eddie Jefferson chronology
Come Along With Me (1969)	Things Are Getting Better (1974)	Still on the Planet (1976)

Things Are Getting Better is an album by vocalist Eddie Jefferson recorded in 1974 and released on the Muse label.

== Reception ==
Professional ratings
Review scores
Source	Rating
AllMusic	4/5 stars
DownBeat	4/5 stars

In his review for AllMusic, Scott Yanow stated: "Singer Eddie Jefferson's first album in five years finds him doing his best to keep up with the times. ... A worthy effort."

== Track listing ==
All lyrics/vocalese composed by Eddie Jefferson

1. "Bitches Brew" (Miles Davis) – 8:46
2. "Things Are Getting Better" (Cannonball Adderley) – 8:24
3. "Freedom Jazz Dance" (Eddie Harris) – 3:57
4. "Night in Tunisia" (Dizzy Gillespie, Frank Paparelli) – 3:13
5. "Trane's Blues" (John Coltrane) – 4:48
6. "I Just Got Back in Town" (James Moody) – 4:29
7. "Billie's Bounce" (Charlie Parker) – 4:07
8. "Thank You (Falettinme Be Mice Elf Agin)" (Sly Stone) – 4:09

== Personnel ==
- Eddie Jefferson – vocals
- Joe Newman – trumpet
- Billy Mitchell – tenor saxophone, flute, bass clarinet
- Mickey Tucker – piano, electric piano, organ
- Sam Jones – bass
- Eddie Gladden – drums
