= Grits & Gravy =

Studio album by Eric Kloss
- Released: May 1967
- Recorded: December 21 & 22, 1966
- Studio: Van Gelder Studio, Englewood Cliffs, New Jersey
- Genre: Jazz
- Length: 37:57
- Label: Prestige; PR 7486
- Producer: Cal Lampley

Eric Kloss chronology
| Love and All That Jazz (1966) | Grits & Gravy (1967) | First Class Kloss! (1967) |

Grits & Gravy is an album by saxophonist Eric Kloss which was recorded in 1966 and released on the Prestige label.

== Reception ==
Professional ratings
Review scores
| Source | Rating |
|---|---|
| AllMusic | 4/5 stars |
| The Rolling Stone Jazz Record Guide | 4/5 stars |

AllMusic stated: "Eric Kloss' third recording features the soulful yet adventurous altoist in two different settings".

== Track listing ==
1. "A Day in the Life of a Fool" (Luiz Bonfá, Carl Sigman) - 3:34
2. "Repeat" (Denny Zeitlin) - 3:11
3. "Slow Hot Wind" (Norman Gimbel, Henry Mancini) - 3:02
4. "Gentle One" (Eric Kloss) - 4:01
5. "Grits and Gravy" (Ed Bland) - 2:38
6. "Softly, As in a Morning Sunrise" (Oscar Hammerstein II, Sigmund Romberg) - 5:06
7. "You Don't Know What Love Is" (Gene de Paul, Don Raye) - 6:05
8. "Milestones" (Miles Davis) - 10:20
- Recorded at Van Gelder Studio in Englewood Cliffs, New Jersey on December 21 (tracks 1, 3 & 5) and December 22 (tracks 2, 4 & 6–8), 1966

== Personnel ==
- Eric Kloss - alto saxophone
- Danny Bank - baritone saxophone, flute, percussion (tracks 1, 3 & 5)
- Teddy Charles - vibraphone (tracks 1, 3 & 5)
- Jaki Byard (tracks 2, 4 & 6–8), Ronald Williams (tracks 1, 3 & 5) - piano
- Billy Butler - guitar (tracks 1, 3 & 5)
- Ronnie Boykins (tracks 1, 3 & 5), Richard Davis (tracks 2, 4 & 6–8) - bass
- Alan Dawson (tracks 2, 4 & 6–8), Robert J. Gregg (tracks 1, 3 & 5) - drums
- Ed Bland - arranger (tracks 1, 3 & 5)
