= Essence (Eric Kloss album) =

Studio album by Eric Kloss
- Released: 1974
- Recorded: December 14, 1973; New York City
- Genre: Jazz
- Label: Muse; MR 5019
- Producer: Don Schlitten

Eric Kloss chronology
One, Two, Free (1972)	Essence (1974)	Bodies' Warmth (1975)

Essence is an album by saxophonist Eric Kloss which was recorded in 1973 and released on the Muse label.

== Reception ==
Professional ratings
Review scores
Source	Rating
AllMusic	3/5 stars
The Rolling Stone Jazz Record Guide	3/5 stars

AllMusic reviewer Scott Yanow wrote: "A fine set that, along with most of Kloss' many Muse releases, is long overdue to be reissued."

== Track listing ==
All compositions by Eric Kloss.

1. "Love Will Take You There" - 15:38
2. "Affinity" - 8:57
3. "Essence" - 16:36
4. "Descent" - 3:41

== Personnel ==
- Eric Kloss - alto saxophone, tenor saxophone
- Hannibal Marvin Peterson - trumpet
- Mickey Tucker - electric piano, piano
- Buster Williams - bass
- Ron Krasinski - drums
- Sonny Morgan - percussion (track 3)
