= One, Two, Free =

Studio album by Eric Kloss
- Released: November 1973
- Recorded: August 28, 1972
- Studio: New York City
- Genre: Jazz
- Length: 41:51
- Label: Muse; MR 5019
- Producer: Don Schlitten

Eric Kloss chronology
Doors (1972)	One, Two, Free (1973)	Essence (1973)

One, Two, Free is an album by saxophonist Eric Kloss which was recorded in 1972 and released on the Muse label.

== Reception ==
Professional ratings
Review scores
Source	Rating
AllMusic	4/5 stars
The Rolling Stone Jazz Record Guide	4/5 stars
DownBeat	4/5 stars

AllMusic awarded the album 4 stars stating "Although based in the hard bop tradition, altoist Eric Kloss was always open to the influence of the avant-garde... Eric Kloss pushes himself and his sidemen throughout the date, and even if the Fender Rhodes sounds a bit dated, the high musicianship and chance-taking are still exciting to hear."

Downbeat awarded the release 4 stars. Herb Nolan called the album "an exemplary showcase of his [Kloss] virtuosity as a player and composer. It also reveals his tremendous feeling for melody, especially evident in his tune "Licea" . . . One. Two. Free is a well-balanced album, one that can be listened to over and over again".

== Track listing ==
Side one: One, Two, Free Suite
No.	Title	Writer(s)	Length
1.	"One, Two Free" "Elegy" "The Wizard"	Eric Kloss; Pat Martino; Ron Thomas	18:03

Side two
No.	Title	Writer(s)	Length
1.	"It's Too Late" (Carole King cover)	King; Toni Stern	13:38
2.	"Licea"	Kloss	10:10

== Personnel ==
- Eric Kloss – alto saxophone
- Ron Thomas – electric piano, tambourine
- Pat Martino – guitar
- Dave Holland – bass
- Ron Krasinski – drums
