= Mister Mysterious =

Studio album by Mickey Tucker
- Released: 1979
- Recorded: June 23, 1978
- Studio: Van Gelder Studio, Englewood Cliffs, NJ
- Genre: Jazz
- Length: 34:33
- Label: Muse; MR 5174
- Producer: Mitch Farber

Mickey Tucker chronology
Sweet Lotus Lips (1978)	Mister Mysterious (1979)	Theme for a Woogie Boogie (1978)

Mister Mysterious is an album by pianist Mickey Tucker which was recorded in 1978 and released on the Muse label.

== Reception ==
Professional ratings
Review scores
Source	Rating
Allmusic	3/5 stars
The Rolling Stone Jazz Record Guide	3/5 stars

The Allmusic review awarded the album 3 stars.

== Track listing ==
All compositions by Mickey Tucker

1. "Plagio" - 7:05
2. "A Prayer" - 4:39
3. "Mister Mysterious" - 5:00
4. "Taurus Lullaby" - 7:20
5. "Cecilitis" - 3:24
6. "Basic Elements" - 7:05

== Personnel ==
- Mickey Tucker - piano
- Cecil Bridgewater - trumpet
- Frank Foster - tenor saxophone, soprano saxophone, flute
- Pepper Adams - baritone saxophone
- Cecil McBee - bass
- Eddie Gladden - drums
- Ray Mantilla - percussion (track 1 &4)
- Azzedin Weston - congas (track 4)
