= Now (Eric Kloss album) =

Studio album by Eric Kloss
- Released: 1978
- Recorded: January 4 & 5, 1978
- Studio: Van Gelder Studio, Englewood Cliffs, NJ
- Genre: Jazz
- Length: 39:33
- Label: Muse; MR 5147
- Producer: Fred Seibert

Eric Kloss chronology
Together (1976)	Now (1978)	Celebration (1979)

Now is an album by saxophonist Eric Kloss recorded in 1978 and released on the Muse label.

== Reception ==
Professional ratings
Review scores
Source	Rating
AllMusic	3/5 stars
The Rolling Stone Jazz Record Guide	2/5 stars

The AllMusic review by Scott Yanow stated: "The music is generally lyrical and the leader plays well, even if the rhythm section is fairly anonymous, but little all that memorable occurs".

== Track listing ==
All compositions by Eric Kloss.

1. "We Are Together" - 7:32
2. "Now" - 6:39
3. "Morning Song" - 6:35
4. "Hey, Hey, Whatta You Say?" - 5:21
5. "Autumn Blue" - 6:22
6. "Booga Wooga Woman" - 7:04

== Personnel ==
- Eric Kloss - alto saxophone, tenor saxophone
- Mike Nock - keyboards
- Mike Richmond - bass
- Jimmy Madison - drums
- Efrain Toro - cowbell
