= Introducing Eric Kloss =

Studio album by Eric Kloss with Don Patterson
- Released: February 1966
- Recorded: September 1, 1965
- Studios: Van Gelder Studio, Englewood Cliffs, New Jersey
- Genre: Jazz
- Length: 36:11
- Labels: Prestige; PR 7442
- Producer: Cal Lampley

Eric Kloss chronology
Introducing Eric Kloss (1966)	Love and All That Jazz (1966)

Introducing Eric Kloss is the debut album by saxophonist Eric Kloss which was recorded in 1965 and released on the Prestige label.

== Reception ==
Professional ratings
Review scores
Source	Rating
AllMusic	3/5 stars
The Rolling Stone Jazz Record Guide	3/5 stars

AllMusic stated: "And what an introduction. The 16-year-old Eric Kloss joins forces with organist Don Patterson in what is a top-flight date for both of them... Kloss combined with the others in this quartet to produce a hard bop, organ jazz session that stands with the best".

== Track listing ==
All compositions by Eric Kloss, except as noted.

1. "Close Your Eyes" (Bernice Petkere) - 6:45
2. "Old Folks" (Dedette Lee Hill, Willard Robison) - 5:45
3. "'S 'Bout Time" (Don Patterson) - 8:05
4. "That's the Way It Is" - 5:29
5. "All Blues" (Miles Davis) - 5:37
6. "Embraceable You" (George Gershwin, Ira Gershwin) - 4:30
- Recorded at Van Gelder Studio in Englewood Cliffs, New Jersey on September 1, 1965

== Personnel ==
- Eric Kloss - alto saxophone, tenor saxophone
- Don Patterson - organ
- Pat Martino - guitar
- Billy James - drums
