= Aaron Heick =

American saxophonist and woodwood player

Aaron Heick is an American saxophonist and woodwind player, born September 13, 1961, in Seattle, currently living in New York.

He is best known for his work on the CBS Orchestra for the Late Show with David Letterman.

He has worked with Chaka Khan, with whom he recorded and toured through most of the 1990s, Richard Bona, Barbra Streisand, Paul Simon, Aretha Franklin, Frank Sinatra, Bruce Springsteen, Sir Elton John, Carly Simon, Donald Fagen, James Taylor, Lady Gaga, Lenny Kravitz, Sheryl Crow, Billy Joel, Suzanne Vega, Vonda Shepard, Cyndi Lauper, Audra McDonald, Philip Glass, Vanessa Williams, Boz Skaggs, Christopher Cross, Ben E. King, Bobby Caldwell, Steps Ahead, The Manhattan Transfer, Ray Baretto, Willie Colon, The Caribbean Jazz Project, and Panic! At The Disco.
