= The Crawl (Mickey Tucker album) =

Studio album by Mickey Tucker
- Released: 1980
- Recorded: May 16, 1979; CI Recording Studio, New York City
- Genre: Jazz
- Label: Muse; MR 5223
- Producer: Mitch Farber

Mickey Tucker chronology
Theme for a Woogie Boogie (1978)	The Crawl (1980)	Blues in Five Dimensions (1989)

The Crawl is an album by pianist Mickey Tucker which was recorded in 1979 and released on the Muse label.

== Reception ==
Professional ratings
Review scores
Source	Rating
Allmusic	3/5 stars
The Rolling Stone Jazz Record Guide	4/5 stars

The Allmusic review awarded the album 3 stars stating "Tucker plays decent piano and outstanding organ, and it's the organ solos and accompaniment that generate the infrequent sparks".

== Track listing ==
All compositions by Mickey Tucker except as indicated

1. "The Crawl" - 6:48
2. "It Could Be, If It Was, But It Ain't" - 7:17
3. "Just a Thought for Love" - 4:05
4. "June Bug, June Bug; Where You Fly?" - 6:05
5. "Pisces Brothers" (Roy Brooks) - 8:35
6. "Marcus Tiberius and the Gladiator" - 4:02

== Personnel ==
- Mickey Tucker - piano
- Marcus Belgrave - trumpet, flugelhorn
- Slide Hampton - trombone
- Junior Cook - tenor saxophone
- Ted Dunbar - guitar (track 1)
- Earl May - bass
- Billy Hart - drums
