= Jimmy Owens (musician) =

American jazz trumpeter, composer, lecturer, and educator

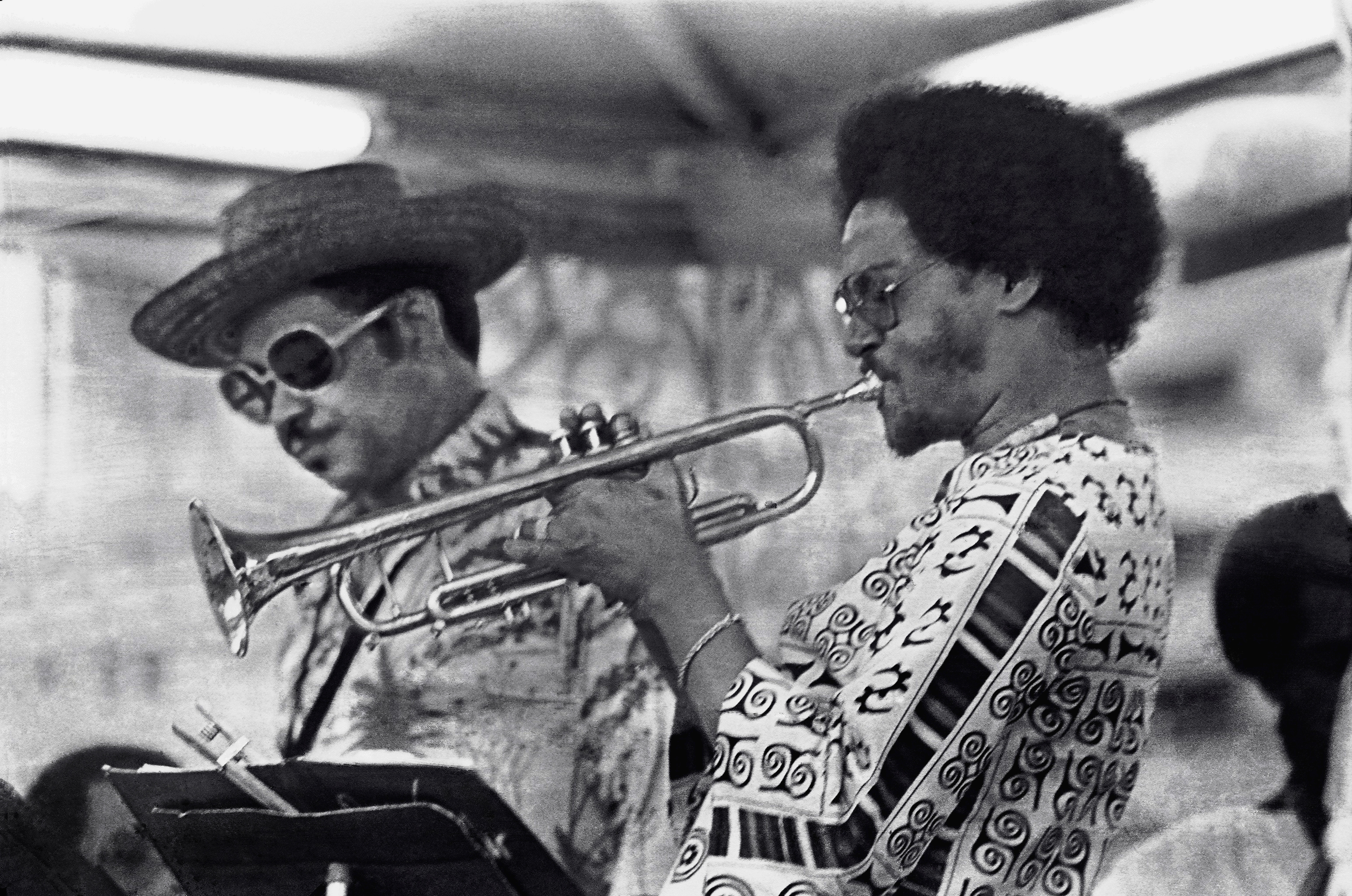
- Frank Wess and Jimmy Owens in 1977

Background information
- Born: December 9, 1943 (age 82); New York City, New York, United States
- Genre: Jazz
- Occupations: Musician, composer, arranger, lecturer
- Instrument: Trumpet
- Label: Columbia

Jimmy Owens (born December 9, 1943) is an American jazz trumpeter, composer, arranger, lecturer, and educator. He has played with Lionel Hampton, Charles Mingus, Hank Crawford, Dizzy Gillespie, Count Basie, Herbie Mann, among many others. Since 1969, he has led his own group, Jimmy Owens Plus.

== Biography ==
Jimmy Owens was born in New York City, New York, United States. He is a jazz trumpeter and, in addition, plays the flugelhorn. He is also a composer, lecturer, arranger and music education consultant, harnessing more than 45 years of musical experience. Owens does not have an enormous number of recordings as a leader; however, his career was instead nourished through session work with groups and band leaders. His encounter with music encompasses a vast range of intercontinental musical success including ballets, movie scores, serving as a band leader and even creating orchestral compositions. He has performed with jazz musicians such as Max Roach, Duke Ellington, Charles Mingus, Kenny Barron, Count Basie, Benny Golson, Billy Taylor, Lionel Hampton, Hank Crawford, and Gerald Wilson among others. All throughout his musical career, Owens demonstrated his understanding of the jazz concepts, but also illustrates a proficient comprehension of the blues style, and provided musically emotional atmospheres for ballads.

== 1950s and 1960s ==
Owens began playing the trumpet at the age of fourteen under the tutelage of Donald Byrd and later studied music composition with Henry Brant. At the age of fifteen, Owens had the opportunity of sitting in with Miles Davis' band; however, he did not record with them. In the late 1960s, he was a member of Marshall Brown’s Newport Youth Band. Owens graduated from The High School of Music & Art in New York City when he was aged 14, and subsequently attended the University of Massachusetts, where he obtained his master's degree in Education. In the 1960s, he was a member of the hybrid classical and rock band Ars Nova. After Ars Nova ended, he was a member of the New York Jazz Sextet. Among the members of this group at various times were Sir Roland Hanna, Ron Carter, Billy Cobham, Benny Golson, Hubert Laws, and Tom McIntosh. In addition, he has led his own group, Jimmy Owens Plus, since the 1970s, touring and playing in festivals and concerts. His performances with his band have taken him to Asia, South and Central America, the Middle East and various parts of Europe. In 1969, he helped found Collective Black Artist, a non-profit jazz education and performing organization. Between 1969 and 1972, Owens was a sideman on The David Frost Show, whose musical director was Dr. Billy Taylor. Sidemen in this group included Frank Wess, Seldon Powell, Barry Galbraith, and Bob Cranshaw. Stepping into adulthood, Owens had already established a good reputation for himself that led him to the opportunities such as touring France with Duke Ellington.

== 1970s ==
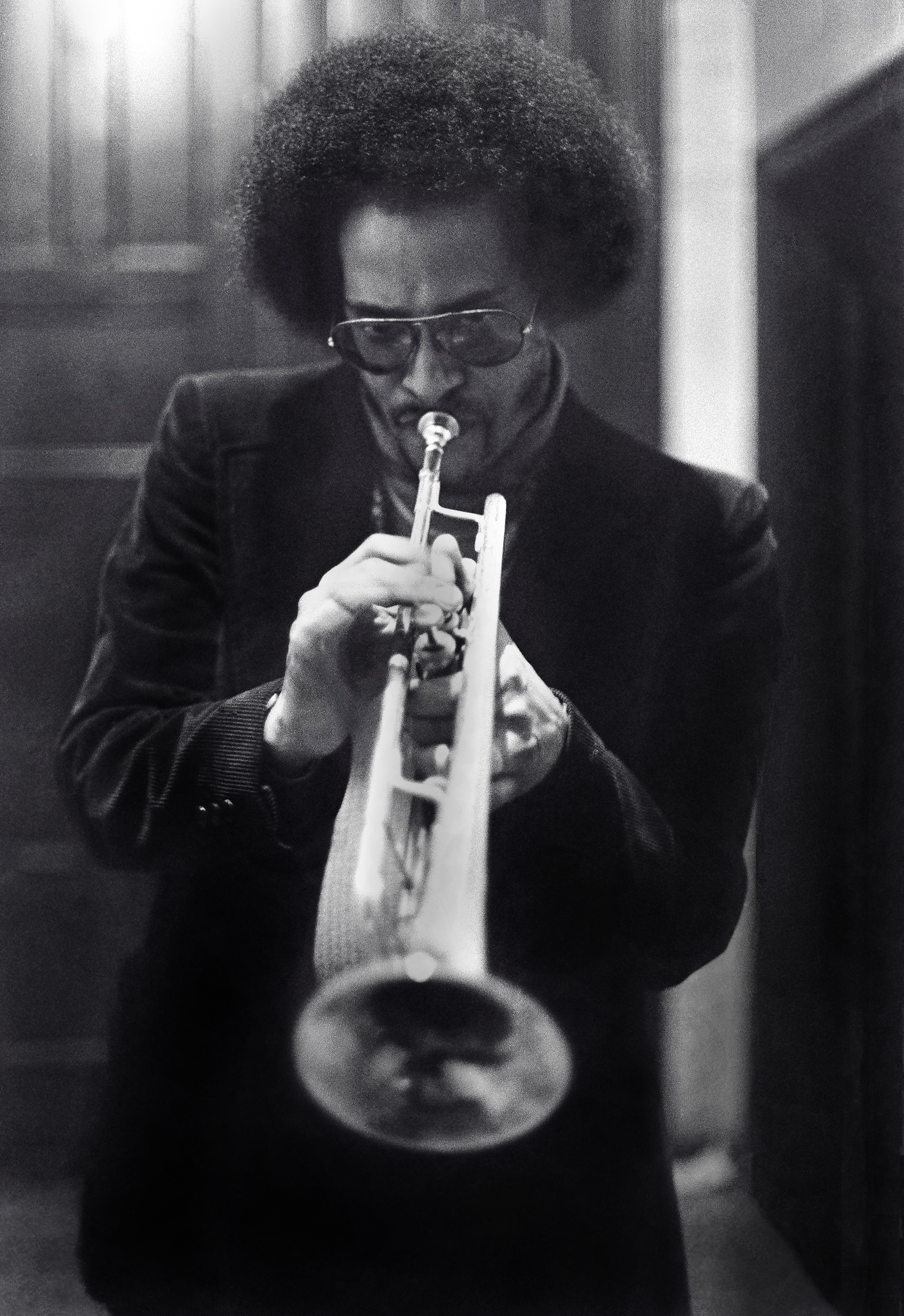
Owens in Rochester, N.Y. in 1978

Jimmy Owens toured France again in 1971 with the Young Giants of Jazz, performed with radio orchestras in Germany and the Netherlands, and also played with Chuck Israels’ National Jazz Ensemble. At the 1970 Newport Jazz Festival, Owens was one of the youngest trumpet players present to participate in a tribute that was played in the honor Louis Armstrong. That same year, Owens released his first album, No Escaping It (1970), on which he seamlessly demonstrated his musical edge while maintaining a warm tone, along with decisive notation. In 1972, he was chosen to play a trumpet tribute for past trumpeters, such as Dizzy Gillespie and Roy Eldridge, at the inaugural Ellington Fellowship Concert that was held at Yale University. In the 1970s, Owens did a great deal of travelling and began doing yearly European Tours in Spain, France, Italy, Denmark, England, the Netherlands, and Sweden. During this time, he was shown a great amount of appreciation in orchestral and symphonic music through his guest appearances with the Southern University Symphony Orchestra, the Rochester Philharmonic Orchestra, the Symphony of the New World, and the Hannover Radio Philharmonic Orchestra. One of his performance highlights of the 1970s was the tour he took in the U.S. called, Western States Arts Foundation Tour. After his first album, he released three more albums titled, Jimmy Owens, Young Man on the Move and Heading Home; all of which were released the 1970s. In 1972, Owens began giving back to the community by becoming a member of the National Endowment for the Arts music panel up until 1976. This organization sought to aid in funding numerous organizations and individual artists. From 1977 to 1981, he was a member of the music panel for the New York State Council on the Arts, which funded New York State cultural organizations.

== 1980s ==
In the 1980s, Owens demonstrated no lack in the passion that he held for music. He continued venturing overseas, and played in a variety festivals and concerts in different countries. He also performed concerts in the Middle East and Africa during his Tour of North Africa and the Middle East, U.S. State Department (1981). Jimmy Owens Plus also toured South American in their South American Tour (1983 and 1986) and also performed across Central America in their Tour of Caribbean, Central and South America (1989). Owens received several awards during the 1980s including the 'Survival of the Black Artist Award' (1980) from Howard University, the International Success Award (1983) from the Marabu Club in Italy, and the "Manhattan Borough President’s Award for Excellence in the Arts" (1986). In 1989, Owens released an album called The Jazz Mobile Allstars, featuring Billy Taylor, Frank Wess, Victor Gaskin, Ted Dunbar and Bobby Thomas.

== 1990s ==
In 1990, the Jazz Musicians' Emergency Fund was founded to help individual musicians with medical, financial, and housing assistance after Jamil Nasser and Jimmy Owens presented this idea to the board. Both Nasser and Owens felt it was very important to help individual jazz musicians rather than organizations. This program not only provided financial assistance, but it also offered counseling in career development as well as substance abuse. In that same year, Owens took a part-time position as an instructor at the New School Jazz and Contemporary Music Program, where he taught private lessons, the business aspects of the music industry and various ensemble classes. In the 1990s, he attended quite a few jazz festivals in Austria, England and in the U.S., while serving as a guest soloist to a variety of bands’ performances in America and Europe. In 1996, Bob Crenshaw, Jamil Nasser, Benny Powell and Owens helped to revitalize the Jazz Advisory Committee at Local 802 in New York City. This particular commission advises Local 802 on the conflicts surrounding most jazz artists and seeks methods of resolution. Owens was also a member of the negotiating committee to secure health and pension benefits, along with schedule wage increases for the faculty at the New School.

== 2000s ==
In the new millennium, Jimmy Owens remained moderately involved within programs and events that give back to numerous communities. He performed at a variety of events such as Giants of Jazz (2002–09) in New Jersey, the Cab Calloway Tribute (2005) in Japan, and the Dizzie Gillespie Tribute (2005–07) in New York City. He appeared at numerous festivals across the globe such as the Graz Jazz Festival (2004) in Graz, Austria, the World Music Festival (2005) in Bahia, Brazil, the Novokuznesk Jazz Festival (2005) in Siberia, several celebrations in Italy and the Jazz Town Jazz Club (2005) in Moscow, Russia. In 2007, he released an album called Peaceful Walking, which was recorded in Italy and contains original songs performed with Great Italian trio Capiozzo- Mecco & Santimone (drum-hammond- guitar). In 2012, he released an album entitled Monk Project, which commemorates the life and musical innovation of jazz pianist Thelonious Monk, who died in 1982.

== Conclusion ==
Owens is an active member of the jazz education community. He sits on the board of the Jazz Foundation of America, which was founded in 1989. He is an innovative jazz artist whose eclecticism incorporates every aspect of jazz music and artistry. He has been an outspoken advocate concerning the welfare of musicians and the jazz culture of America. He is also a composer whose works have been, and still are, performed nationally by the Rochester Philharmonic Orchestra and the Brooklyn Philharmonic Orchestra and various orchestras; also, his music can be heard internationally by the Metropole Orchestra in the Netherlands and the Hanover Radio Philharmonic Orchestra in Germany. His career as a music educator has led him to positions conducting workshops, teaching seminars, giving lectures, and holding concerts at numerous institutes around the world.

In 1972 and on the night of the visiting fellows program in honor of Duke Ellington, Owens recalls the night:

"I was center stage with some of the greatest men in the history of Jazz, and I wanted to perform something really meaningful. Since Jazz music has its roots in spirituals that later developed into the blues, I wanted to express my respect for these men by performing a spiritual and the blues. I looked around. I saw Eubie Blake, Benny Carter, Johnny Hodges, and Paul Robeson. I was standing in the midst of so many of the African American people who had contributed significantly to the history of American culture. What an incredible moment it was! It reconfirmed for me what I had learned in my travels as an artist. Jazz is the heartbeat of the world."

== Discography ==
=== As leader ===
- You Had Better Listen with Kenny Barron (Atlantic, 1967)
- No Escaping It (Polydor, 1970)
- Jimmy Owens (A&M/Horizon, 1976)
- Headin' Home (A&M/Horizon, 1978)
- Peaceful Walking (Jay-Oh Jazz, 2007)
- Monk Project (IPO, 2012)

=== As sideman ===
With Bill Barron

- Jazz Caper (Muse, 1978 [1982])
- Variations in Blue (Muse, 1983)
- The Next Plateau (Muse, 1987 [1989])

With Eric Kloss

- First Class Kloss! (Prestige, 1967)
- Life Force (Prestige, 1967)
- We're Goin' Up (Prestige, 1967)

With Yusef Lateef

- Yusef Lateef's Detroit (Atlantic, 1969)
- Part of the Search (Atlantic, 1973)

With Herbie Mann

- Our Mann Flute (Atlantic, 1966)
- Impressions of the Middle East (Atlantic, 1966)
- The Herbie Mann String Album (Atlantic, 1967)

With David "Fathead" Newman

- Bigger & Better (Atlantic, 1968)
- Concrete Jungle (Prestige, 1978)

With Archie Shepp

- The Way Ahead (Impulse!, 1968)
- For Losers (Impulse!, 1971)
- Kwanza (Impulse!, 1974)

With Gerald Wilson

- The Golden Sword (Pacific Jazz, 1966)
- New York, New Sound (Mack Avenue, 2003)
- In My Time (Mack Avenue, 2005)
- Monterey Moods (Mack Avenue Records, 2007)
- Detroit (Mack Avenue, 2009)

With Joe Zawinul

- The Rise and Fall of the Third Stream (Vortex, 1968)
- Zawinul (Atlantic, 1970)

With All Star group

- One More: Music of Thad Jones Vol 1 (IPO Recordings, 2005)
- One More: The Summary - Music of Thad Jones Vol 2 (IPO Recordings, 2006)

With others

- Curtis Amy, Mustang (Verve, 1967)
- Louis Armstrong, Louis Armstrong and His Friends (Flying Dutchman/Amsterdam, 1970)
- Gary Bartz, Libra (Milestone Records, 1967/68)
- Kenny Barron, Innocence (Wolf, 1978)
- Gary Bartz, Libra (Milestone, 1968)
- Willie Bobo, A New Dimension (Verve, 1968)
- Kenny Burrell, Blues - The Common Ground (Verve, 1968)
- Jaki Byard, On the Spot! (Prestige, 1967)
- Billy Cobham, Spectrum (Atlantic, 1973)
- Hank Crawford, Dig These Blues (Atlantic, 1966)
- Teddy Edwards, It's All Right! (Prestige, 1967)
- Duke Ellington & Teresa Brewer, It Don't Mean a Thing If It Ain't Got That Swing (Flying Dutchman, 1973)
- Booker Ervin, Heavy!!! (Prestige, 1968)
- Dizzy Gillespie, The Dizzy Gillespie Reunion Big Band (MPS, 1968)
- Billy Harper, Capra Black (Strata-East, 1973)
- Milt Jackson, Born Free (Limelight, 1966)
- The Thad Jones / Mel Lewis Orchestra, Opening Night (Resonance, 1966) – earlier issue on AGP
- Howard Johnson, Warren Smith, Julius Watkins, Al Gibbons, Johnny Coles, Composers Workshop Ensemble (Strata-East, 1973)
- Clifford Jordan, Soul Fountain (Vortex, 1966 [1970])
- Hubert Laws, Laws' Cause (Atlantic, 1968)
- Junior Mance, I Believe to My Soul (Atlantic, 1968)
- Les McCann, Comment (Atlantic, 1970)
- Tom McIntosh, With Malice Towards None (IPO Recordings, 2004)
- Charles Mingus, Music Written for Monterey 1965 (Jazz Workshop, 1965)
- James Moody, Moody and the Brass Figures (Milestone, 1966)
- Oliver Nelson, Oliver Edward Nelson in London with Oily Rags (Flying Dutchman, 1974)
- Shirley Scott, Superstition (Cadet, 1973)
- Billy Taylor, The Jazzmobile Allstars (Taylor-Made, 1989) with Frank Wess, Victor Gaskin, Ted Dunbar and Bobby Thomas
- Buddy Terry, Electric Soul! (Prestige, 1967)
- Leon Thomas, Full Circle (Flying Dutchman, 1973)
- Bobby Timmons, Got to Get It! (Milestone, 1967)
- Charles Tolliver, Impact (Strata-East, 1975)
- Larry Willis, A New Kind of Soul (LLP, 1970)

=== Education ===
- Masters of Education (M.Ed.), University of Massachusetts, Amherst, MA (1975)
- Private composition studies with Henry Brant, New York, NY (1965–66)
- Private study on trumpet with Carmine Caruso (1961–63), Dr. Donald Byrd (1958–60)
- High School of Music and Art, New York, NY (1961)

=== Performance highlights ===
Jimmy Owens Plus ...

- Fordham University, Bronx African and African-American History Project (2013)
- Jazz Foundation of America Loft Party (2009)
- The Monk Influence, Celebration of Thelonious Monk’s 90th Birthday, New School for Jazz and Contemporary Music (2007)
- Fordham University, Bronx African and African-American History Project, Bronx, NY (2005)
- Tour of Caribbean, Central and South America (1989)
- South American Tour (1983 and 1986)
- Jazz in Grande Motte, France with Jimmy Owens Plus..., Max Roach and Chico Freeman (1981)
- Tour of North Africa and the Middle East, U.S. State Department (1981)
- Senegal’s 20th Independence Anniversary Concert and African Tour (1980)
- Western States Arts Foundation Tour (1978 and 1979)
- Manhattan House of Detention Concert Series (1974)
- Yearly European Tours including Italy, France, Spain, Portugal, Denmark, Sweden, Netherlands, England (1972 to Present)
- Kongsberg Jazz Festival, Norway (1972)

Jimmy Owens

- A Touch of Taylor, Salute to Billy Taylor, New York, NY (2010)
- Celebrating Billy Strayhorn, St. Peter's Church, New York, NY (2009)
- University of Pittsburgh Jazz Seminar, Pittsburgh, PA (2007, 2009)
- Celebrating Billie Holiday, St. Peter's Church, New York, NY (2008)
- Giants of Jazz, South Orange, NJ (2002–2009)

Honors and awards

- A. B. Spellman NEA Jazz Masters Award for Jazz Advocacy (2012)
- Y’All New York Salutes Jimmy Owens (2009)
- Benny Golson Jazz Master Award, Howard University (2008)
- Lifetime Achievement Award, New York Brass Conference (2007)
- Dr. Billy Taylor Humanitarian Award, Jazz Foundation of America (2002)
- Grant for Oral History Project, National Endowment for the Arts (1990)
- Manhattan Borough President's Award for Excellence in the Arts (1986)
- International Success Award, Marabu Club, Italy (1983)
- Composition Fellowship, National Endowment for the Arts (1980)
- Survival of the Black Artist Award, Howard University, Washington, DC (1980)
- New Leaders for the ‘80s Award, Black Enterprise Magazine (1979)
- Presidential Citation, Clark College, Atlanta, GA (1972)
- America Achievement Award, Jazz at Home Club of America (1972)
- International Critics Poll for Talent Deserving Wider Recognition, Downbeat Magazine (1967)
- Winner of competition to join Newport Youth Band (1959)
