= Vic Juris =

American jazz guitarist (1953–2019)

- Born: Victor Edward Jurusz Jr. September 26, 1953; Jersey City, New Jersey, U.S.
- Died: December 31, 2019 (aged 66) Livingston, New Jersey, U.S.
- Genres: Jazz
- Occupation: Musician
- Instrument: Guitar
- Years active: 1970s–2019
- Labels: Muse, SteepleChase, Zoho
- Formerly of: Dave Liebman

Victor Edward Jurusz Jr. (September 26, 1953 – December 31, 2019), known professionally as Vic Juris, was an American jazz guitarist.

== Music career ==
Juris was born in Jersey City, New Jersey, but he moved with his family to Parsippany early in his life. In 1963, at the age of 10, he began learning guitar. At 11, he studied guitar at the home of his teacher, Ed Berg, and got interested in jazz listening to Berg's records of guitarists Django Reinhardt, Jim Hall, Barney Kessel, Jimmy Raney, and Johnny Smith. In his teens he played the rock music of the 1960s. When he was 19, he befriended saxophonist Eric Kloss, and he made his recording debut on Kloss's album Bodies' Warmth (Muse, 1975). Around the same time, he met guitarist Pat Martino, who became a friend and mentor.

Juris recorded with Richie Cole during 1976–78 and released his debut album as a leader, Roadsong, in 1979. In the early 1980s, he turned to acoustic guitar in duos with Larry Coryell and Biréli Lagrène, and in the late 1980s he worked with Gary Peacock's band. Since 1991 he has spent much of his career with saxophonist David Liebman.

During the 1990s, he worked as sideman with Lee Konitz and Peggy Stern (1992), Benny Waters (1993), Jeanie Bryson (1993–94), Gary Peacock (since 1994), Steve LaSpina (since 1995), Judi Silvano (1996), Ken Serio (1996, 2007, 2019) and Joe Locke (1998).

Juris taught at The New School for Jazz and Contemporary Music, Lehigh University, and Rutgers University and wrote instructional books for guitar.

In the summer of 2019, Juris began to experience unusual fatigue while touring. He was soon diagnosed with metastatic liver cancer. Friends launched an online fundraiser to help cover the cost of his treatment, but he died on New Year's Eve.

== Discography ==
=== As leader ===
- Roadsong (Muse, 1978)
- Horizon Drive (Muse, 1980)
- Bleecker Street (Muse, 1982)
- Bohemia with John Etheridge (Jazzpoint, 1988)
- For the Music (Jazzpoint, 1992)
- Night Tripper (SteepleChase, 1995)
- Music of Alec Wilder (Double-Time, 1996)
- Pastels (SteepleChase, 1996)
- Moonscape (SteepleChase, 1997)
- Remembering Eric Dolphy (SteepleChase, 1999)
- Songbook (SteepleChase, 2000)
- Songbook 2 (SteepleChase, 2002)
- Journey with Giuseppe Continenza (Jardis, 2003)
- Seven Steps To Heaven with Giuseppe Continenza, Dominique Di Piazza and Pietro Iodice (Wide Sound, 2003)
- While My Guitar Gently Weeps (SteepleChase, 2004)
- Blue Horizon (Zoho, 2004)
- A Second Look (Mel Bay, 2005)
- Jazz Hits Vol. 1 with MB3 (Mel Bay, 2006)
- Omega Is the Alpha (SteepleChase, 2010)
- Listen Here (SteepleChase, 2011)
- Free Admission (SteepleChase, 2012)
- Walking On Water (SteepleChase, 2014)
- Blue (SteepleChase, 2015)
- Vic Juris Plays Victor Young (SteepleChase, 2016)
- Eye Contact (SteepleChase, 2018)
- Let's Cool One (SteepleChase, 2020)

=== As sideman ===
With David Amram

- Live at Musikfest! (New Chamber Music, 1990)
- On the Waterfront On Broadway (Varese Sarabande, 1995)

With Jeanie Bryson

- I Love Being Here with You (Telarc, 1993)
- Tonight I Need You So (Telarc, 1994)

With Richie Cole

- New York Afternoon (Muse, 1977)
- Alto Madness (Muse, 1978)
- Keeper of the Flame (Muse, 1979)
- Pure Imagination (Concord Jazz, 1987)
- Signature (Milestone, 1988)
- Kush (Heads Up, 1995)
- West Side Story (Venus, 1996)
- Trenton Style (Alto Madness Music, 1999)

With Bill Goodwin

- Network (Omnisound, 1982)
- Three Is a Crowd (TCB, 1994)

With Jack Kerouac

- Pull My Daisy...and Other Jazz Classics (Premier, 1995) – also with David Amram
- Jack Kerouac Reads On the Road (Rykodisc, 1999)

With Bireli Lagrene

- Live (Jazzpoint, 1985)
- Live at Carnegie Hall (Jazzpoint, 1993)
- A Tribute to Django Reinhardt (Jazzpoint, 1999)

With Steve LaSpina

- When I'm Alone (SteepleChase, 1995)
- Story Time (SteepleChase, 1996)
- When Children Smile (SteepleChase, 1997)
- The Bounce (SteepleChase, 2000)
- Remember When (SteepleChase, 2003)

With Stephen Riley

- My Romance (SteepleChase, December 2021)

With Dave Liebman

- Classic Ballads (Candid, 1991)
- Turn It Around (Owl, 1992)
- Miles Away (Owl, 1995)
- Songs for My Daughter (Soul Note, 1995)
- Voyage (Evidence, 1996)
- John Coltrane's Meditations (Arkadia Jazz, 1997)
- New Vista (Arkadia Jazz, 1997)
- Liebman Plays Puccini (Arkadia Jazz, 2001)
- The Unknown Jobim (Global Music Network, 2001)
- Beyond the Line (OmniTone, 2003)
- Conversation (Sunnyside, 2003)
- In a Mellow Tone (Zoho, 2004)
- Back On the Corner (Tone Center, 2006)
- Blues All Ways (OmniTone, 2007)
- Further Conversations (Azul Music, 2008)
- Live at MCG (MCG 2009)
- Live/As Always (Mama, 2010)
- Turnaround (Jazzwerkstatt, 2010)
- Lineage (Whaling City Sound, 2013)

With Barry Miles

- Sky Train (RCA Victor, 1977)
- Fusion Is... (Century, 1978)

With Judi Silvano

- Vocalise (Blue Note, 1997)
- Songs I Wrote or Wish I Did (JSL, 2000)

With Mel Tormé

- A New Album (Gryphon, 1980)
- The London Sessions (DCC, 1990)

With others

- Jamie Baum, Undercurrents (Konnex, 1992)
- Frank Catalano & Jimmy Chamberlin, Tokyo No. 9 (Ropeadope, 2017)
- Marc Copland & Vic Juris, Double Play (SteepleChase, 2001)
- Stanley Cowell, Welcome to This New World (SteepleChase, 2013)
- Giacomo Gates, Centerpiece (Origin, 2004)
- Tim Hagans, The Moon Is Waiting (Palmetto, 2011)
- Eric Kloss, Bodies' Warmth (Muse, 1975)
- Lee Konitz & Peggy Stern, Lunasea (Soul Note, 1992)
- Joe Locke, Slander and Other Love Songs (Milestone, 1998)
- Charlie Mariano, Savannah Samurai (Jazzline, 1998)
- Don Patterson, Movin' Up! (Muse, 1977)
- Deepak Ram, Steps Golden Horn (GHP, 2008)
- Rufus Reid, Quiet Pride (Motema, 2013)
- Loren Stillman, The Brothers' Breakfast (SteepleChase, 2006)
- Brian Torff, Hitchhiker of Karoo (Quade, 1987)
- Roseanna Vitro, Passion Dance (Telarc, 1996)
- Benny Waters, Plays Songs of Love (Jazzpoint, 1993)
- Phil Woods, Songs Two (Philology, 2015)
