= Diamond in the Riff =

Studio album by Terry Silverlight
- Released: 1 September 2008
- Recorded: January 1–July 2008
- Genre: Jazz
- Length: 71:00
- Label: Terry Silverlight Records
- Producer: Terry Silverlight with Barry Miles

Terry Silverlight chronology
Wild!! (2006)	Diamond in the Riff (2008)	Songwriter/Producer: Volumes I & II (2009)

Diamond in the Riff is a 2008 album by Terry Silverlight, featuring pianist/composer Barry Miles, bassist Will Lee, and David Mann, Aaron Heick, Glenn Alexander, Tabitha Fair, Lew Soloff, Bob Malach, Larry Farrell and Allan Molnar.

The All About Jazz reviewer commented that, "While it seems most jazz players today are trying to capture something that predates or postdates true jazz fusion, Silverlight is happy to seize upon that sound, circa something 1976–1989, before 'smooth jazz' took over this art form."

== Track listing ==
All tracks composed by Terry Silverlight; except where indicated

1. "Nature Drum"
2. "Boulevard"
3. "Diamond in the Riff"
4. "Nothing Like Today"
5. "The Velvet Room"
6. "Do It"
7. "Monkey Dance"
8. "Tom Boy"
9. "Plaza Mexico" (Barry Miles)
10. "For The Rest of My Life"
11. "Earth Blue"
12. "Freetom"
13. "PT"
14. "Vinyl Song"

== Personnel ==
- Terry Silverlight: drums, percussion, vocals on "Nothing Like Today", keyboards except piano and Minimoog
- Barry Miles: acoustic piano throughout and Minimoog on "Diamond In The Riff"
- Will Lee: bass
- David Mann: saxophone
- Aaron Heick: saxophone
- Glenn Alexander: guitar
- Tabitha Fair: vocals
- Lew Soloff: trumpet on "Nothing Like Today"
- Bob Malach: saxophone on "Nothing Like Today"
- Larry Farrell: trombone on "Nothing Like Today"
- Allan Molnar: vibes on "Diamond In The Riff"
