= Sojourn (album) =

Studio album by Mickey Tucker
- Released: 1977
- Recorded: March 28, 1977; RCA Studios, New York City
- Genre: Jazz
- Label: Xanadu; 143
- Producer: Don Schlitten

Mickey Tucker chronology
Doublet (1976)	Sojourn (1977)	Sweet Lotus Lips (1978)

Sojourn is an album by pianist Mickey Tucker which was recorded in 1977 and released on the Xanadu label.

== Reception ==
Professional ratings
Review scores
Source	Rating
Allmusic	2/5 stars

The Allmusic review awarded the album 2 stars.

== Track listing ==
All compositions by Mickey Tucker

1. "Fast Train to Zurich" - 7:01
2. "Norwegian Nights-Norwegian Days" - 7:28
3. "Tunisian Festival" - 8:09
4. "The Silent Mind of Fraulein Stein" - 8:58
5. "French Fables" - 4:22
6. "Dusseldorf Dance" - 9:35

== Personnel ==
- Mickey Tucker - piano
- Bill Hardman - trumpet
- Junior Cook - tenor saxophone
- Ronnie Cuber - baritone saxophone
- Cecil McBee - bass
- Eddie Gladden - drums
