= Battle of the Saxes =

Live album by Eric Kloss and Richie Cole
- Released: 1977
- Recorded: March 26 & 27, 1976; The Tin Palace, NYC
- Genre: Jazz
- Length: 42:09
- Label: Muse; MR 5082
- Producer: Michael Cuscuna

Eric Kloss chronology
Bodies' Warmth (1975)	Battle of the Saxes (1977)	Together (1976)

Battle of the Saxes (subtitled Volume 1) is a live album by saxophonists Eric Kloss and Richie Cole recorded in 1976 and released on the Muse label.

== Reception ==
Professional ratings
Review scores
Source	Rating
AllMusic	4/5 stars

AllMusic awarded the album 4 stars.

== Track listing ==
All compositions by Richie Cole, except as indicated.

1. "Ebony Godfather" (Eric Kloss) – 9:52
2. "Robin" – 11:22
3. "D.C. Farewell" – 7:45
4. "Harold's House of Jazz" – 13:00

== Personnel ==
- Richie Cole, Eric Kloss – alto saxophone
- Mickey Tucker – electric piano
- Rick Laird – bass, electric bass
- Eddie Gladden – drums
