= The New Heritage Keyboard Quartet =

Studio album by Mickey Tucker and Roland Hanna
- Released: 1973
- Recorded: January 16, 17 & 18, 1973
- Studio: A&R Studios, New York City, NY
- Genre: Jazz
- Length: 40:53
- Label: Blue Note
- Producer: Don Hahn

Roland Hanna chronology
Sir Elf (1973)	The New Heritage Keyboard Quartet (1973)	Perugia (1975)

The New Heritage Keyboard Quartet is an album by American jazz keyboardists Roland Hanna and Mickey Tucker recorded in 1973 and released on the Blue Note label.

== Reception ==
Professional ratings
Review scores
Source	Rating
AllMusic	2/5 stars

The Allmusic review awarded the album 2 stars.

== Track listing ==
All compositions by Mickey Tucker, except where indicated.

1. "Zap! Carnivorous" (John Hicks) – 7:27
2. "Sin No. 86½" – 7:14
3. "State of Affairs" – 6:57
4. "Delphi" (R. Williamson) – 7:44
5. "Monstrosity March" – 7:18
6. "Child of Gemini: So You Will Know My Name" (Roland Hanna) – 4:13

== Personnel ==
- Mickey Tucker, Roland Hanna - piano, clavinet, harpsichord
- Richard Davis - bass
- Eddie Gladden - drums, percussion
