= Richie Cole (musician) =

American jazz saxophonist (1948–2020)

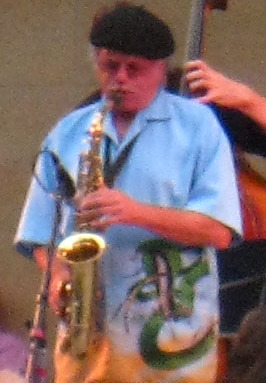
- Cole in August 2009

Background information
- Born: February 29, 1948; Trenton, New Jersey, U.S.
- Died: May 2, 2020 (aged 72) Carnegie, Pennsylvania, U.S.
- Genres: Jazz
- Occupation: Musician
- Instrument: Saxophone
- Years active: 1969–2020
- Labels: Muse; Palo Alto; Heads Up
- Website: www.richiecole.com

Richie Cole (February 29, 1948 – May 2, 2020) was an American jazz saxophonist, composer, and arranger.

== Early life ==
Cole was born in Trenton, New Jersey. He began to play the alto saxophone when he was ten years old, encouraged by his father, who owned a jazz club in New Jersey. He was a graduate of Ewing High School, in Ewing Township, New Jersey. Cole won a scholarship from DownBeat magazine to attend the Berklee School of Music in Boston.

== Career ==
In 1969, he joined drummer Buddy Rich's Big Band. After working with Lionel Hampton's Big Band and Doc Severinsen's Big Band, he formed his own quintet and toured worldwide, developing his own "alto madness" bebop style in the 1970s and early 1980s. He formed the Alto Madness Orchestra in the 1990s.

Cole performed and recorded with Eddie Jefferson, Nancy Wilson, Tom Waits, The Manhattan Transfer, Hank Crawford, Freddie Hubbard, Eric Kloss, Bobby Enriquez, Phil Woods, Sonny Stitt, Art Pepper, and Boots Randolph. He recorded over fifty albums, including his albums Hollywood Madness (Muse, 1979) and Richie Cole Plays West Side Story (Music Masters, 1997), a tribute to Leonard Bernstein.

He was appointed to the Board of the National Jazz Service Organization and the Board for the National Endowment for the Arts, where he served as chairman for one year. He was a charter member of the International Association of Jazz Educators.

In 2005, he was awarded the State of California Congressional Certificate of Lifetime Achievement in Jazz on behalf of the Temecula Jazz Society.

Cole died of natural causes on May 2, 2020.

== Personal life ==
Cole was briefly engaged to actress Brenda Vaccaro in 1979. He has two daughters, Amanda Marrazzo, a writer/reporter/producer and Annie Cole, a music agent.

== Discography ==
=== As leader ===
- Trenton Makes, the World Takes (Progressive, 1976)
- Starburst with Reuben Brown Trio (Adelphi, 1976)
- Battle of the Saxes with Eric Kloss (Muse, 1976)
- New York Afternoon with Eddie Jefferson (Muse, 1977)
- Alto Madness with Eddie Jefferson (Muse, 1978)
- Keeper of the Flame with Eddie Jefferson (Muse, 1979)
- Hollywood Madness with Eddie Jefferson and The Manhattan Transfer (Muse, 1979)
- Side by Side with Phil Woods (Muse, 1980)
- Cool 'C' (Muse, 1981)
- Tokyo Madness (Seven Seas / King [Japan], 1981)
- Alive! at the Village Vanguard (Muse, 1981)
- Return to Alto Acres with Art Pepper (Palo Alto, 1982)
- The Wildman Meets the Madman with Bobby Enriquez (GNP Crescendo, 1982)
- Yakety Madness! with Boots Randolph (Palo Alto, 1983)
- Alto Annie's Theme (Palo Alto, 1983)
- Some Things Speak for Themselves (Muse, 1983)
- Bossa Nova Eyes (Palo Alto, 1985)
- Pure Imagination (Concord Jazz, 1986)
- Popbop (Milestone, 1987)
- Signature (Milestone, 1988)
- Bossa International with Hank Crawford (Milestone, 1990)
- Profile (Heads Up, 1993)
- Kush: The Music of Dizzy Gillespie (Heads Up, 1996)
- West Side Story (Venus [Japan], MusicMasters, 1996)
- Trenton Style (Jazz Excursion, 1998)
- Pure Madness (32 Jazz, 1999) compilation
- Come Sunday: My Kind Of Religion (Jazz Excursion, 2000)
- A Tribute to Our Buddies (Fresh Sound, 2004)
- Back on Top (Jazz Excursion, 2005)
- A Piece of History (Jazz Excursion, 2006)
- Rise's Rose Garden (Jazz Excursion, 2006)
- The Man with the Horn (Jazz Excursion, 2007)
- Live at KUVO 2/11/08 (Jazz Excursion, 2008)
- Bebop Express (Jazz Excursion, 2008)
- The KUVO Sessions, Volume 2 (Jazz Excursion, 2009)
- Castle Bop with Emil Viklický (Multisonic, 2011)
- Vocal Madness with the Uptown Vocal Jazz Quartet (House Cat, 2014)
- Breakup Madness (Akashic, 2014)
- Mile Hi Madness (Akashic, 2015)
- Pittsburgh (Richie Cole Presents, 2015)
- Plays Ballads and Love Songs (Richie Cole Presents, 2016)
- Have Yourself an Alto Madness Christmas (Richie Cole Presents, 2016)
- The Many Minds of Richie Cole (Richie Cole Presents, 2017)
- Latin Lover (Richie Cole Presents, 2017)
- Cannonball (Richie Cole Presents, 2018)
- The Keys of Cool with Tony Monaco (Richie Cole Presents, 2019)

=== As sideman ===
With Eddie Jefferson

- Still on the Planet (Muse, 1976)
- The Main Man (Inner CIty 1977)
- The Live-Liest (Muse 1979)
- Vocal Ease (32 Records, 1999; Savoy, 2003)

With The Manhattan Transfer

- Extensions (Atlantic, 1979)
- Mecca for Moderns (Atlantic, 1981)
- Vocalese (Atlantic, 1985)

With Red Rodney

- Home Free (Muse, 1979) – rec. 1977
- Red, White and Blues (Muse, 1978)
- The 3R's with Ricky Ford (Muse, 1982) – rec. 1979

With others

- Greg Abate, Dr. Jekyll & Mr. Hyde (Candid, 1995)
- Les DeMerle, You're the Bop! A Jazz Portrait of Cole Porter (Summit, 2001)
- Allan Harris, The Genius of Eddie Jefferson (Resilience Music Alliance, 2018)
- Jim Holman, Explosion! (Delmark, 2012)
- Freddie Hubbard, Back to Birdland (Real Time, 1982)
- Vic Juris, Roadsong (Muse, 1978)
- Peter Lauffer, Keys to the Heart (Peter Lauffer/CD Baby, 2010)
- Karen Marguth, A Way With Words (Wayfae Music/CD Baby, 2013)
- Mark Murphy, Stolen Moments (Muse, 1978)
- Mark Murphy, Satisfaction Guaranteed (Muse, 1980)
- Mark Murphy, Bop for Kerouac (Muse, 1981)
- Oliver Nelson, Swiss Suite (Flying Dutchman/RCA, 1971)
- Anita O'Day, Big Band at Carnegie Hall (Emily, 2009)
- Don Patterson, Movin' Up! (Muse, 1977)
- Buddy Rich, Keep the Customer Satisfied (Liberty 1970)
- Janine Santana, Soft as Granite (Janine Santana/CD Baby, 2008)
- Sigmund Snopek III, Virginia Woolf (Gear Fab, 2000)
- Sonny Stitt, Just in Case You Forgot How Bad He Really Was [live; rec. 1981] (32 Jazz, 1998)
- James Van Buren, Live at the Kasbah (Van Buren Records and Tapes/CD Baby, 2003)
- Patrice Villastrigo, Golden Orchid (Skinny Llama/CD Baby, 2010)

== DVDs ==
- From Village Vanguard (2004) – includes both the Johnny Griffin Quartet and the Richie Cole Group (a quintet) in two separate sets/performances; recorded 1981
- Eddie Jefferson in Concert Featuring Richie Cole: Live from the Jazz Showcase – recorded at Joe Segal's Jazz Showcase in Chicago on May 6, 1979 (50 minutes)
- Jazz Legends Live! – part 9 of 13 in this series, starring Dexter Gordon, Gary Burton, Billy Cobham, Ahmad Jamal, Carmen McRae, and Richie Cole (one song – "Confirmation" – four minutes)
- Cool Summer – includes both the Stan Getz Quartet and Alto Madness (Richie's quintet with Bobby Enriquez) in two separate sets/performances at the Paul Masson Winery in California as part of the "Harvest Jazz" TV series; recorded 1981
