= Paul Shaffer =

Canadian musician (born 1949)

Paul Shaffer CM
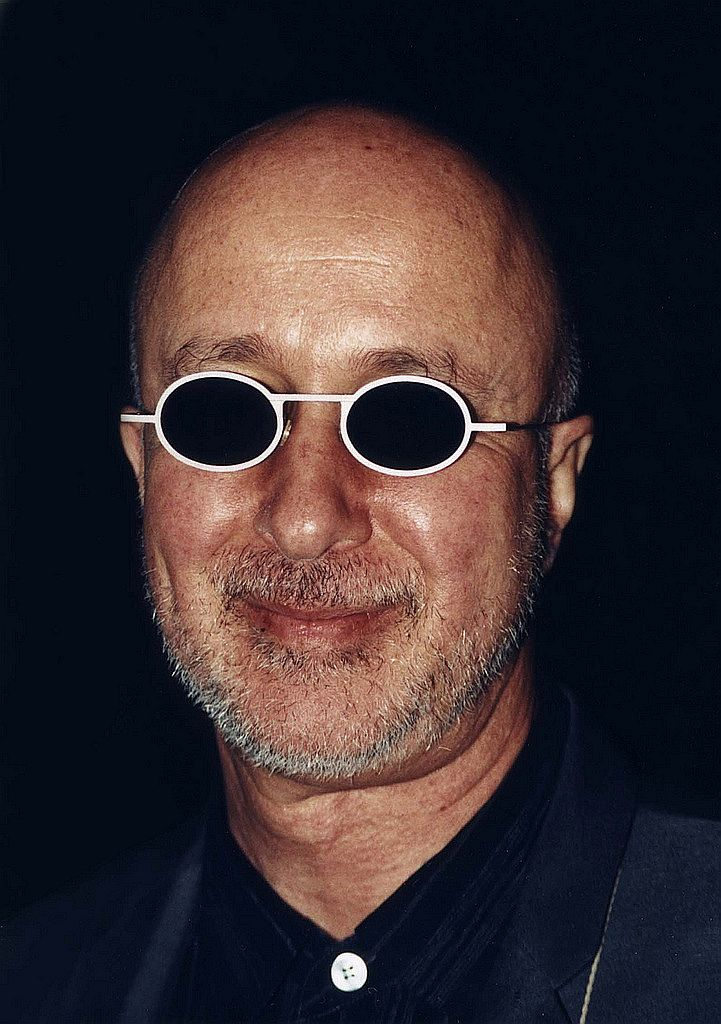
- Shaffer in 2000
- Born: Paul Allen Wood Shaffer; November 28, 1949 (age 76); Toronto, Ontario, Canada
- Occupations: Bandleader; musician; actor; comedian
- Years active: 1972–present
- Spouse: Cathy Vasapoli (m. 1990)
- Children: 2
- Musical career
- Genres: Rock; pop rock; jazz
- Instruments: Vocals; keyboards
- Member of: The World's Most Dangerous Band
- Formerly of: Saturday Night Live Band; The Honeydrippers; The Blues Brothers

Paul Allen Wood Shaffer (born November 28, 1949) is a Canadian musician, actor, and comedian who served as David Letterman's musical director, bandleader, and sidekick on Late Night with David Letterman (1982–1993), Late Show with David Letterman (1993–2015), and My Next Guest Needs No Introduction with David Letterman (2018).

== Early years ==
Shaffer was born in 1949 in Toronto, and raised in Fort William (now part of Thunder Bay), Ontario, Canada, the son of Shirley and Bernard Shaffer. He was raised in the Jewish faith. His father, a lawyer, was a jazz aficionado while his mother loved show tunes. When Shaffer was 12, his parents took him on a trip to Las Vegas where they took in Nat King Cole and other shows; this was an experience Shaffer described later as "life changing" and led to his decision to become a performer. As a child, Shaffer took piano lessons, and in his teenage years played the organ in a band called Fabulous Fugitives with his schoolmates in Thunder Bay. Later, he performed with the "Flash Landing Band" at different venues around Edmonton and the interior of British Columbia. Educated at the University of Toronto, he began playing with jazz guitarist Tisziji Muñoz, performing in bands around the bars there, where he found an interest in musicals, and completed his studies, with a Bachelor of Arts degree in sociology in 1971.

Shaffer appears briefly, playing an organ at an outdoor wedding, in North of Superior (1971), an early IMAX documentary shot in northern Ontario.

== Career ==
=== Godspell to Saturday Night Live ===
Shaffer began his music career in 1972 when Stephen Schwartz invited him to be the musical director for the Toronto production of Godspell, starring Victor Garber, Gilda Radner, Martin Short, Eugene Levy, Dave Thomas, and Andrea Martin. He went on to play piano for the Schwartz Broadway show The Magic Show in 1974, then became a member of the house band on NBC's Saturday Night Live (SNL) television program from 1975 to 1980 (except for a brief departure in 1977). Shaffer also regularly appeared in the show's sketches, notably as the pianist for Bill Murray's Nick the Lounge Singer character, and as Don Kirshner. He also appeared as a keyboardist on the 1978 album Desire Wire, recorded by pop/rock star, musician, and backing vocalist Cindy Bullens.

Shaffer occasionally teamed up with the Not Ready for Prime-Time Players off the show, as well, including work on Gilda Radner's highly successful Broadway show and as the musical director for John Belushi and Dan Aykroyd whenever they recorded or performed as the Blues Brothers. Shaffer was to appear in the duo's 1980 film, but as he revealed in October 2009 on CBS Sunday Morning, Belushi dropped him from the project. In a memo to fellow SNL colleagues, Belushi said that he was unhappy that Shaffer was spending so much time on a studio record for Radner. Belushi said that he had tried to talk Shaffer out of working on the album in the first place to avoid sharing Shaffer's talents with another SNL-related project. Shaffer later reported that he was in (unrequited) love with Radner. He went on to appear in 1998's Blues Brothers 2000.

Shaffer left SNL in 1977 for a few months to co-star with Greg Evigan in A Year at the Top, a short-lived CBS sitcom in which Shaffer and Evigan play two musicians from Idaho who relocate to Hollywood, where they are regularly tempted by a famous promoter (who is actually the devil's son), played by Gabriel Dell, to sell their souls in exchange for a year of stardom. Though the series only lasted a few episodes, a soundtrack album was released.

Following the series' cancellation, Shaffer returned to SNL during the show's third season during the 1977-78 season. He was named a cast member during the 1979-80 season as a featured player, making him the first and only band member to join the cast. In the spring of 1980, Shaffer became the first person to say "fuck" on SNL. That year, SNL parodied The Troggs Tapes with a medieval musical sketch featuring Shaffer, Bill Murray, Harry Shearer, and a "special guest appearance" by John Belushi (who had left the show the previous year). In the middle of a long tirade that featured repeated use of the word "flogging", Shaffer inadvertently uttered the forbidden word. It not only escaped the censors in the live broadcast and the West Coast taped airing, but also reappeared in the summer rerun, and even in the syndicated versions of the show for several years.

Shaffer, along with executive producer Lorne Michaels, the entire cast, most of the writing staff, and several other band mates, left the show at the end of the season, after five years. Decades after leaving the show, Shaffer recounted that Jean Doumanian (who was taking over as producer the next season) offered him to be the new musical-director in light of Howard Shore leaving, but he turned it down. Citing in part that he didn't want to start the show again with a brand new cast, and he felt five years was enough time to do the show.

In February 2015, Shaffer appeared on the 40th-anniversary special of SNL, playing music to Bill Murray's lounge-singer character, a love song from the movie Jaws.

=== Collaboration with David Letterman ===
Beginning in 1982, Shaffer served as musical director for David Letterman's late night talk shows: as leader of "The World's Most Dangerous Band" for Late Night with David Letterman (1982–1993) on NBC, for which he also composed the theme song, and as leader of the CBS Orchestra for the Late Show with David Letterman (1993–2015) on CBS. Letterman consistently maintained that the show's switch to CBS was because NBC "caught Paul stealing pens" or some other trivial reason. Shaffer guest-hosted the show four times when Letterman was unavailable: February 9 and 11, 2000, during Letterman's recovery from his quintuple heart bypass surgery; March 24, 2003, when Letterman was suffering from shingles; and January 19, 2005, when Letterman went to receive an award for his racing team's victory in the 2004 Indianapolis 500.

Shaffer wrote and performs the bridging music on Letterman's Netflix series My Next Guest Needs No Introduction with David Letterman which premiered in 2018. After Netflix announced publicly that it had given the series an order, Shaffer received a phone call from Letterman asking him to work on the show. Soon after, Shaffer began to receive cuts of episodes from the first season and he started to put music in afterwards where the director thought it was needed. In developing the sound of the show's music, Shaffer initially looked to Letterman for guidance. Finding none, he remembered his and Letterman's shared love for the sort of music produced at the Muscle Shoals Sound Studio in Sheffield, Alabama, describing it as "the honesty you hear, the southern soul feeling". The score initially included drums, but the show's producers and director thought that the music should "feel like it's Dave's old friend Paul playing," so it was ultimately stripped down to solely include piano and organ.

=== Musical collaboration ===
Shaffer recorded the synthesizer solo in the 1982 song "Goodbye to You" by the band Scandal. He used his Oberheim OB-Xa to emulate a 1960s organ sound.

In 1984, Shaffer played keyboards for the Honeydrippers, a group formed in 1981 by former Led Zeppelin frontman Robert Plant, on their only studio album, The Honeydrippers: Volume One. The album included the hit single "Sea of Love" which reached number one on Billboard's adult contemporary chart in 1984 and number three on its Hot 100 chart in 1985.

He released two solo albums, 1989's Coast to Coast, and 1993's The World's Most Dangerous Party, produced by rock musician Todd Rundgren. Shaffer has also recorded with a wide range of artists, including Donald Fagen, Ronnie Wood, Grand Funk Railroad, Diana Ross, B.B. King, Asleep at the Wheel, Cyndi Lauper, Carl Perkins, Yoko Ono, Blues Traveler, Jeff Healey, Cher, Barry Manilow, Chicago, Luba, George Clinton, Bootsy Collins, Nina Hagen, Peter Criss, Scandal, Brian Wilson, Late Show regular Warren Zevon, jazz trumpeters Miles Davis and Lew Soloff, jazz saxophonist Lou Marini, and bluegrass legend Earl Scruggs. In 1982, he co-wrote "It's Raining Men" with Paul Jabara. It was number one on the US Billboard Hot Dance Club Play charts, a number-two hit in the UK for The Weather Girls in 1984, and a UK number-one cover for Geri Halliwell in 2001. Shaffer and the World's Most Dangerous Band performed the Chuck Berry song "Roll Over Beethoven" for the 1992 film Beethoven.

Shaffer has served as musical director and producer for the Rock and Roll Hall of Fame induction ceremony since its inception in 1986 and filled the same role for the 1996 Summer Olympics closing ceremony in Atlanta. Shaffer also served as musical director for Fats Domino and Friends, a Cinemax special that included Ray Charles, Jerry Lee Lewis, and Ronnie Wood.

Shaffer has hosted Musicians Hall of Fame and Museum induction concert and ceremonies.

In 2017, Shaffer reunited with his band, resuming its previous name, and recorded the self-titled album Paul Shaffer and the World's Most Dangerous Band. Shaffer and the band released their album in March and then went on tour, as well, as making appearances on both Jimmy Kimmel Live and The Late Show with Stephen Colbert, for which Shaffer and the band returned to the Ed Sullivan Theater for the first time since Letterman's finale two years earlier. In 2023, the band returned to 30 Rockefeller Plaza to act as the house band for one episode of The Tonight Show Starring Jimmy Fallon while the regular band, the Roots, prepared for the 65th Annual Grammy Awards in Los Angeles. They returned to the Tonight Show for a week in February 2025 when the Roots took a week off to rehearse for Saturday Night Live's 50th anniversary special. Shaffer revisited Studio 6A, where Late Night had been taped, in 2023 to perform a cover of Patti LaBelle’s “New Attitude” with Kelly Clarkson for her eponymous talk show.

=== Movie and documentary appearances ===
Shaffer has appeared in a number of motion pictures over the years, including a small role (Artie Fufkin of Polymer Records) in Rob Reiner's This Is Spinal Tap and its 2025 sequel Spinal Tap II: The End Continues, Blues Brothers 2000, a scene with Miles Davis in the Bill Murray film Scrooged, and as a passenger in John Travolta's taxicab in Look Who's Talking Too. In addition, Shaffer lent his voice to Disney's animated feature and television series Hercules as the character Hermes.

Shaffer appeared in Greg Zola's documentary about Sly Stone, Small Talk About Sly which was completed sometime prior to 2017.

He is portrayed by Aaron Lustig in the 1996 telefilm The Late Shift and by Paul Rust in the 2024 theatrical release Saturday Night.

=== Other television and radio appearances ===
He hosted Happy New Year, America in 1994 on CBS.

Shaffer was considered for the role of George Costanza in Seinfeld, but never returned the call from Jerry Seinfeld that offered him the role. In 2001, Shaffer hosted the VH1 game show Cover Wars with DJ/model Sky Nellor. The show featured cover bands competing for the ultimate series win. Each week, Shaffer signed off with, "Just because you're in a cover band, it doesn't mean you're not a star." The show lasted 13 episodes and featured celebrity judges including Kevin Bacon, Nile Rodgers, Cyndi Lauper, and Ace Frehley.

Shaffer served as musical director for 2001's The Concert for New York City, and accompanied Adam Sandler's "Opera Man" sketch and the Backstreet Boys' "Quit Playing Games (with My Heart)".

In 2002, he hosted the infamous Friars Club Roast of Chevy Chase on Comedy Central in which the presenters' insults directed at the comedian were so vicious, Shaffer reportedly had to console him afterwards.

Shaffer hosts the 60-second radio vignettes called "Paul Shaffer's Day in Rock". These audio shorts were first produced for Envision Radio Networks and debuted in 2007 on New York station WAXQ-FM.

In 2008, Shaffer made a cameo appearance at the beginning of the Law & Order: Criminal Intent season-seven episode "Vanishing Act".

In February 2013, he appeared in an episode of the sitcom How I Met Your Mother titled "P.S. I Love You", in which the character of Robin (Cobie Smulders) is revealed to have been obsessed with him. The letters "P.S." in the episode title refer to Paul Shaffer.

Shaffer was the musical director for A Very Murray Christmas, a 2015 Netflix variety special starring Bill Murray in which Shaffer also appears and performs extensively.

In December 2018, he made a cameo appearance in an episode of the Canadian sitcom Schitt's Creek, during which he played the piano at a Christmas party. The episode, titled "Merry Christmas, Johnny Rose," also reunited him with his former Godspell colleague Eugene Levy.

Shaffer competed on the second season of the TV series The Masked Singer as "Skeleton".

In 2019, Shaffer began hosting Paul Shaffer Plus One, a monthly talk show on SiriusXM and AXS TV that featured Shaffer interviewing colleagues in the music industry such as Sammy Hagar, Graham Nash, ZZ Top's Billy Gibbons, and Donald Fagen of Steely Dan.

=== Charity work ===
Since 2002, he has been the national spokesperson for Epilepsy Canada. On September 29, 2005, Shaffer made a major contribution to Lakehead University to dedicate the fifth-floor ATAC boardroom to his father Bernard Shaffer, inaugural member of the board of governors. In June 2006, he received a star on Canada's Walk of Fame.

In 2005, along with Steven Van Zandt, he organized a benefit for Mike Smith (formerly of The Dave Clark Five), who had suffered a paralysing fall at his home in Spain. Shaffer cites Mike Smith as an early influence.

In 2012, Shaffer appeared in 12-12-12: The Concert for Sandy Relief, where Shaffer accompanied Adam Sandler. The concert raised money for the people who were affected by Hurricane Sandy in October 2012.

Shaffer is a member of Canadian charity Artists Against Racism.

=== Memoir ===
Shaffer's memoir, We'll Be Here for the Rest of Our Lives: A Swingin' Show-biz Saga (co-authored by David Ritz) was published on October 6, 2009. The same day, he made an appearance as a guest on The Late Show.

== Honours ==
The National Black Sports and Entertainment Hall of Fame inducted Shaffer in 2002 for his part in opening doors in the entertainment industry for African-Americans.

Shaffer was inducted into the Order of Canada, Canada's highest honour, in 2007.

In May 2015, the Ride of Fame honoured Shaffer with a double-decker sightseeing bus in New York City to commemorate his long run as the leader of the CBS Orchestra for the Late Show with David Letterman.

In 2002, a street that surrounds the Thunder Bay Community Auditorium in his hometown was renamed Paul Shaffer Drive.

Shaffer has received two honorary doctorates, including one from Lakehead University.

== Personal life ==
Shaffer has been married to Cathy Vasapoli, a former talent booker on Good Morning America, since 1990. The couple has one daughter, Victoria and one son, William.

== Discography ==
- 1989: Coast to Coast
- 1993: The World's Most Dangerous Party
- 2017: Paul Shaffer & The World's Most Dangerous Band (Sire Records)
