= Eric Kloss =

American jazz saxophonist (born 1949)

- Born: April 3, 1949 (age 77); Greenville, Pennsylvania, U.S.
- Genres: Jazz
- Occupations: Musician; educator
- Instruments: Alto saxophone; tenor saxophone
- Years active: 1965–1980s
- Labels: Prestige; Muse; Omni Sound; Live at EJ's

Eric Kloss (born April 3, 1949) is an American jazz saxophonist.

== Music career ==
Kloss was born blind in Greenville, Pennsylvania, near Pittsburgh, and attended Western Pennsylvania School for Blind Children, where his father, Dr. Alton G. Kloss, was superintendent. At ten years old, he began to play the saxophone, and two years later, he was playing in night clubs with professional musicians, such as Bobby Negri, Charles Bell, and Sonny Stitt. At age 16, he recorded his debut album, Introducing Eric Kloss (1965), playing both alto and tenor saxophones with Don Patterson and Pat Martino.

On his third album, Grits & Gravy (1966), he was recording with musicians over twice his age: Jaki Byard, Richard Davis, and Alan Dawson. He continued recording and performing while a student at Duquesne University. A fan of Elvis Presley and The Ventures, he was attracted to the growth of jazz fusion in the 1960s and 1970s, and eventually worked in the fusion idiom with Chick Corea, Dave Holland, and Jack DeJohnette. He also collaborated with Richie Cole and Gil Goldstein and played sessions with Cedar Walton, Jimmy Owens, Kenny Barron, Jack DeJohnette, Booker Ervin, Chick Corea, Barry Miles, and Terry Silverlight.

In the 1980s, Kloss taught at Rutgers University, then Duquesne University and Carnegie Mellon. He and his wife, a vocalist, collaborated in a group called Quiet Fire. He has performed and recorded rarely since the 1980s, due to health problems.

Eric was a frequent guest on the PBS television show Mister Rogers' Neighborhood, appearing eight times—first in 1971 and finally in 1996.

== Discography ==
=== As leader/co-leader ===
- Introducing Eric Kloss (Prestige, 1965)
- Love and All That Jazz (Prestige, 1966)
- First Class Kloss! (Prestige, 1967)
- Grits & Gravy (Prestige, 1967)
- Life Force (Prestige, 1968)
- We're Goin' Up (Prestige, 1968)
- To Hear Is to See! (Prestige, 1969)
- Sky Shadows (Prestige, 1969)
- In the Land of the Giants (Prestige, 1969)
- Consciousness! (Prestige, 1970)
- One, Two, Free (Muse, 1972)
- Doors (Cobblestone, 1972)
- Essence (Muse, 1974)
- Bodies' Warmth (Muse, 1975)
- Together with Barry Miles (Muse, 1976)
- Battle of the Saxes with Richie Cole (Muse, 1977)
- Now (Muse, 1978)
- Celebration (Muse, 1980)
- Sharing with Gil Goldstein (Omni Sound, 1982)
- Sweet Connections: Live at EJ's (Live at EJ's, 1998)

=== As sideman ===
With Barry Miles

- Sky Train (RCA, 1977)

With Eddie Jefferson

- The Live-Liest (Muse, 1979)

With Pat Martino

- Desperado (Prestige, 1970)
