= Sky Islands (Ramsey Lewis album) =

Studio album by Ramsey Lewis
- Released: October 5, 1993
- Recorded: 1992–93
- Genre: Jazz
- Length: 56:11
- Label: GRP
- Producer: Dave Grusin, Larry Rosen, Ramsey Lewis, Frayne Lewis, Maurice White, Carl Griffin,

Ramsey Lewis chronology
Ivory Pyramid (1992)	Sky Islands (1993)	Urban Knights I (1995)

Sky Islands is a jazz album by American jazz musician Ramsey Lewis, released in October 1993 on GRP Records. The album reached No. 6 on the Billboard Top Jazz Albums chart.

== Critical reception ==
Professional ratings
Review scores
Source	Rating
AllMusic	2/5 stars
USA Today	3/5 stars

James T. Jones IV of USA Today praised Sky Islands saying "The pianist includes a medley of his '60s hits, yet he's hardly resting on his laurels with this collection of instrumentals, occasionally spiced by vocals...Lewis juxtaposes backbeats with sounds of swirling strings, while his solos sparkle with sparse, yet melodic, high arpeggios." Scott Yanow of AllMusic, who gave the album a 2/5 stars rating wrote, "Ramsey Lewis has long been content to record lightweight pop/R&B grooves. Occasionally on this set the acoustic pianist sounds like he would like to break away a bit from the predictable but he keeps the impulse in check."

== Track listing ==
Side one
No.	Title	Writer(s)	Length
1.	"Julia"	John Lennon, Paul McCartney	5:18
2.	"Après Vous"	Ramsey Lewis	4:13
3.	"Who Are You?"	Bill Cantos	7:21
4.	"Suavecito"	Ramsey Lewis	4:53
5.	"Tonight"	Frayne Lewis, Robert Lewis, Ramsey Lewis, Mike Logan	5:18
6.	"Sky Islands"	Larry Dunn	4:20
7.	"A Song for Jan"	Ramsey Lewis	4:52
8.	"Medley: Wade in the Water, Hang On Sloopy, The in Crowd"	Wes Farrell, Ramsey Lewis, William Page, Bert Russell	4:55
9.	"Love Will Find a Way"	Greg Phillinganes, Lionel Richie	5:14
10.	"Come Back to Me"	James Harris, Terry Lewis, Janet Jackson	5:18
11.	"Tonight (instrumental)"	Frayne Lewis, Robert Lewis, Ramsey Lewis, Mike Logan	5:18

== Personnel ==
- Ramsey Lewis – piano, background vocals
- Art Porter Jr. – alto saxophone
- Michael Logan – keyboards, background vocals
- Henry Johnson – guitar
- Chuck Webb – bass guitar, double bass
- Steve Cobb – drums, percussion, vocals
- Tony Carpenter – percussion, background vocals
- Eve Cornelious – lead vocals on "Tonight" and "Love Will Find A Way"
- Sheila Fuller – background vocals
- Carl Griffin – background vocals
- Robert Lewis – background vocals
- Mark Ruffin – background vocals
- Brenda Stewart – background vocals
- Morris Stewart – background vocals

=== Production ===
- Ramsey Lewis - Producer
- Frayne Lewis - Producer
- Carl Griffin - Producer
- Larry Rosen - Executive Producer
- Michael Logan - Associate Producer
- Rich Breen - Engineer, Mixing
- Sharon Franklin - Production Coordination
- Ted Jensen - Mastering
- Michael Landy - Post Production
- Sonny Mediana - Production Director
- Dennis Tousana - Assistant Engineer
- Maurice White - Producer

== Charts ==
Chart (1993)	Peak Position
US Top Contemporary Jazz Albums	6
