= Cruisin' (Earth, Wind & Fire song) =

Song by Earth, Wind & Fire

from the album Get On The Bus Original Soundtrack - Music From And Inspired By The Motion Picture
- Released: October 8, 1996
- Recorded: 1996
- Studio: Sunset Sound, Hollywood
- Genre: R&B, soul
- Length: 5:42
- Songwriters: Philip Bailey, Roxanne Seeman, Morris Pleasure, Sonny Emory
- Producer: Maurice White

Music video
- "Cruisin'" on YouTube

"Cruisin" is a love ballad by the American band Earth, Wind & Fire. It is featured in the film Get On The Bus and was released on the soundtrack album by Interscope Records on October 8, 1996. The song features the falsetto singing on the lead vocals of Philip Bailey. It was included on Earth, Wind & Fire's studio album "In The Name Of Love", the following year. The song was written by Philip Bailey, Roxanne Seeman, Morris Pleasure and Sonny Emory while the production was handled by Maurice White.

It was the first Earth, Wind & Fire song to appear in a movie since "Got To Get You Into My Life" in "Sgt. Pepper's Lonely Heart Club Band."

== Overview ==
Cruisin' was produced by Maurice White and composed by Philip Bailey, Roxanne Seeman, Morris Pleasure and Sonny Emory. The song first appeared on Earth, Wind & Fire's 1996 studio LP "Avatar" which was only released in Japan.

Cruisin' later appeared on EWF's 1997 studio album "In The Name Of Love". That album was issued on Rhino Records and then reissued in 2006 on Maurice White's label Kalimba Music.

Earth, Wind & Fire also contributed the song to the soundtrack of the 1996 feature film Get on the Bus. Get on the Bus was a 1996 American drama about a group of African-American men who are taking a cross-country bus trip in order to participate in the Million Man March. The movie premiered on the March's one year anniversary.

== Critical reception ==
Omoronke Idowu of Vibe called the song "a silky, celestial ballad". When reviewing the album, Geoffrey Himes of The Washington Post, called it a "slow romantic ballad" stating "Bailey's impossibly high tenor sounds as if it's in a permanent swoon." Alex Henderson of AllMusic noted that Cruisin' "sounds like it could have been recorded in the 1970s." Steve Jones of USA Today declared that the song has a "mellow groove". Phyl Garland of Stereo Review also described Cruisin' as "hauntingly atmospheric". Cary Darling for the Orange County Register described it as "sleek."

== Personnel ==
- Philip Bailey – lead and background vocals
- Verdine White – bass guitar
- Sonny Emory – drums
- Morris Pleasure – keyboards
- Scott Mayo - saxophone
- Maurice White – production
