= Urban Knights Presents the Chicago Project =

Studio album by Urban Knights
- Released: March 26, 2002
- Genre: Jazz
- Length: 44:09
- Label: Narada
- Producer: Ramsey Lewis (Exec.), Frayne Lewis

Urban Knights chronology
Urban Knights IV (2001)	Urban Knights Presents the Chicago Project (2002)	Urban Knights V (2003)

Urban Knights Presents the Chicago Project is the fifth studio album by the jazz group Urban Knights released in 2002 on Narada Records. In the US, the album reached No. 30 on the Billboard Top Jazz Albums chart and No. 21 on the Billboard Top Contemporary Jazz Albums chart.

== Overview ==
Singer Bryan Sledge made a guest appearance. The groups covers Stevie Wonder's song "That Girl" on the album.

== Critical reception ==
Professional ratings
Review scores
Source	Rating
AllMusic	4/5 stars
JazzTimes	(favourable)

Hilarie Grey of Jazz Times noted "Though the urban-funk focus is there, this Project provides more opportunities for solo stretches and dazzling technical skills, tailored to best exploit the talents of each player."

Matt Collar of AllMusic favourably wrote "Trumpeter Ron Haynes, guitarist Fareed Haque, and keyboardist Kevin Randolph under the production guidance of Urban Knight Frayne T. Lewis have concocted a funky and slick offering sure to please most smooth jazz aficionados", concluding that "this is hip, danceable, studio-perfect music that references the best of European acid jazz."

== Tracklisting ==
No.	Title	Writer(s)	Length
1.	"That Girl"	Stevie Wonder, Ron Haynes	03:36
2.	"A Place in Time"	Fareed Haque, Frayne Lewis, Kevin Randolph	04:25
3.	"All the Way"	Frayne Lewis, Kevin Randolph	04:25
4.	"Three's Company"	Fareed Haque, Frayne Lewis, Kevin Randolph, Lambert Waldrip	03:44
5.	"Myths and Legands"	Fareed Haque, Frayne Lewis, Kevin Randolph	04:28
6.	"On the Block"	Frayne Lewis, Kevin Randolph	04:09
7.	"Always"	Frayne Lewis, Kevin Randolph, Lambert Waldrip	03:58
8.	"Bombay Streets"	Fareed Haque, Frayne Lewis, Kevin Randolph	03:58
9.	"Tight Rope"	Frayne Lewis, Kevin Randolph	03:50
10.	"Keep It Real"	W. Allen Howard	03:35
11.	"Always"	Frayne Lewis, Kevin Randolph, Lambert Waldrip	04:01
