= Meant to Be (Ramsey Lewis and Nancy Wilson album) =

Studio album by Ramsey Lewis & Nancy Wilson
- Released: February 16, 2002
- Genre: Jazz
- Length: 56:14
- Label: Narada

Ramsey Lewis chronology
Urban Knights IV (2001)	Meant to Be (2002)	Urban Knights V (2003)

Nancy Wilson chronology
A Nancy Wilson Christmas (2001)	Simple Pleasures (2003)	R.S.V.P. (Rare Songs, Very Personal) (2004)

Meant to Be is a studio album by American jazz artists Ramsey Lewis and Nancy Wilson released in 2002 on Narada Records. The album reached No. 3 on the Billboard Top Jazz Albums chart.

== Critical reception ==
Professional ratings
Review scores
Source	Rating
AllMusic	4/5 stars
Miami Herald	3.5/5 stars
Chicago Sun-Times	3/5 stars

Howard Cohen of the Miami Herald praised the album saying "Genre-hoppers Ramsey Lewis and vocalist Nancy Wilson have teamed before in the mid-'80s and once again make for a winning pair. Their latest, Meant to Be, a mix of instrumentals and vocal tracks, clings to the more romantic, mellow side of jazz with hospital-clean acoustics and refined accompaniment from pianist Lewis' trio. As such, the elegant Wilson, who sings on five of the 11 tracks, is in her element." Laura Emerick of the Chicago Sun-Times noted "though Lewis' pianism might serve as the equivalent of aural wallpaper for many jazz purists, their work here will delight their fans."

Matt Collar of AllMusic declared "Ramsey Lewis and Nancy Wilson's 1984 project, The Two of Us, featured synth pop, smooth jazz, and disco-lite covers of tunes such as Paul McCartney's "Ram." While it was a solid attempt at mid-'80s mainstream pop radio airplay, it had little to do aesthetically with the jazz heritage that Lewis and Wilson built their careers on. Fast-forward to 2002 and you find the duo teaming up again on Meant to Be, an album of straight-ahead acoustic jazz. Some fans of The Two of Us may be a little disappointed with the classicist nature of the project, but anyone who's enjoyed the varied work of these two legends should revel in the lush sound they've achieved.

Mario Tarradell of the Dallas Morning News found "Piano man and song stylist unite again, and it's another exquisite effort. Several of Mr. Lewis' instrumentals are sprinkled throughout the 11-song disc, the most ambitious being "A Moment Alone." But the proceedings turn sensual and alluring when Ms. Wilson sings."

== Track listing ==
No.	Title	Writer(s)	Length
1.	"Peel Me a Grape"	Dave Frishberg	5:10
2.	"Truthfully"	Ryan Cohan, Ramsey Lewis	5:51
3.	"Did I Ever Really Live"	Albert Hague, Allan Sherman	2:36
4.	"Velvet Night"	Ramsey Lewis	4:46
5.	"A Moment Alone"	Ramsey Lewis	7:12
6.	"Moondance"	Van Morrison	5:20
7.	"Meant to Be"	Larry Gray, Ramsey Lewis	5:01
8.	"Piano in the Dark"	Scott Cutler, Jeff Hull, Brenda Russell	4:34
9.	"Time Peace"	Ramsey Lewis	6:01
10.	"First Time Love"	Patti Austin, Dave Grusin, Harvey Mason, Sr.	5:31
11.	"Tanquissimo"	Fareed Haque	4:08

== Credits ==
- Acoustic bass – Larry Gray
- Concert Grand Piano – Ramsey Lewis
- Drums – Ernie Adams, Leon Joyce, Jr
- Vocals – Nancy Wilson
