= Change Your Mind =

Change Your Mind may refer to:

== Television ==
- "Change Your Mind" (Steven Universe), an episode of the fifth season of Steven Universe

== Songs ==
- "Change Your Mind" (Sharpe & Numan song), 1985
- "Change Your Mind" (Earth, Wind & Fire song), 2006
- "Change Your Mind" (Keith Urban song), 2020
- "Change Your Mind", a song by The All-American Rejects from Move Along
- "Change Your Mind", a song by Boyce Avenue from All You're Meant to Be
- "Change Your Mind", a song by Camper Van Beethoven from Our Beloved Revolutionary Sweetheart
- "Change Your Mind", a song by Jason Donovan from Ten Good Reasons
- "Change Your Mind", a song by The Killers from Hot Fuss, 2004
- "Change Your Mind", an unreleased song by Kylie Minogue
- "Change Your Mind", a song by LCD Soundsystem from American Dream
- "Change Your Mind", a song by Neil Young from Sleeps with Angels
- "Change Your Mind", a song by Raffaele Riefoli
- "Change Your Mind", a song by Ryan Adams from 1984
- "Change Your Mind", a song by Sister Hazel from Fortress
- "Change Your Mind", a song by Upside Down
- "Change Your Mind", a song by Westlife from Face to Face
- "Change Your Mind (No Seas Cortes)", a song by Britney Spears from Glory
