= Ivory Pyramid =

Studio album by Ramsey Lewis
- Released: 1992
- Genre: Jazz
- Label: GRP
- Producer: Carl Griffin; Frayne Lewis; Ramsey Lewis

Ramsey Lewis chronology
Urban Renewal (1989)	Ivory Pyramid (1992)	Sky Islands (1993)

Ivory Pyramid is a studio album by American jazz pianist Ramsey Lewis, released in 1992 on GRP Records. The album reached No. 7 on the Billboard Contemporary Jazz Albums chart.

== Critical reception ==
Professional ratings
Review scores
Source	Rating
AllMusic	2/5 stars
The Encyclopedia of Popular Music	2/5 stars

Geoffrey Himes of The Washington Post wrote: "The emphasis is on ballads this time, and Lewis's spare phrases evoke a pretty romanticism fleshed out by his fusion quintet."

== Track listing ==
Track listing for Ivory Pyramid
No.	Title	Writer(s)	Length
1.	"Brazilica"	Maurice White, Martin Yarborough	5:06
2.	"People Make the World Go Round"	Thom Bell, Linda Creed	5:24
3.	"Ivory Pyramid"	Ramsey Lewis	4:28
4.	"Sarah Jane"	Dave Grusin	4:29
5.	"Tequila Mockingbird"	Larry Dunn	4:42
6.	"A Night in Bahia"	Ramsey Lewis	5:19
7.	"Malachi (The Messenger)"	Ramsey Lewis	4:12
8.	"Pavanne"	Ramsey Lewis	4:22
9.	"Love's Gotta Hold" (featuring Liz Withers, Bobby Lewis)	Bobby Lewis, Frayne Lewis, Ramsey Lewis	4:30
10.	"Jackson Park"	Frayne Lewis, Ramsey Lewis	4:48

== Personnel ==
- Bass [electric, electric upright] – Charles Webb
- Drums, percussion – Steve Cobb
- Electric guitar, acoustic guitar – Henry Johnson
- Keyboards [electric] – Mike Logan
- Piano – Ramsey Lewis
- Vocals – Abimelec Cruz, Brenda M. Stewart, Elizabeth Withers, Jamie O. Navarro, Jesse Stanford, Kevin C. James, Mario C. Johnson, Morris Stewart, Bobby Lewis, Shannon Tate, Sheila Fuller
- Producers – Carl Griffin, Frayne Lewis, Ramsey Lewis
