= Name of Love =

Name of Love may refer to:

- Name of Love, a 1988 Crosby, Stills, Nash & Young song
- Name of Love (Jean-Roch song), 2012
- Name of Love (Cinema Staff song), 2019

== See also ==
- In the Name of Love (disambiguation)
