= Urban Knights II =

Studio album by Urban Knights
- Released: April 8, 1997
- Recorded: 1996
- Genre: Jazz
- Length: 49:50
- Label: GRP
- Producer: Maurice White

Urban Knights chronology
Urban Knights I (1995)	Urban Knights II (1997)	Urban Knights III (2000)

Urban Knights II is the second studio album by the jazz group Urban Knights released in 1997 on GRP Records. The album reached No. 7 on the US Billboard Top Jazz Albums chart and No. 24 on the UK Top Jazz Albums chart.

== Critical reception ==
Professional ratings
Review scores
Source	Rating
AllMusic	3/5 stars
Los Angeles Times	3/4 stars
Jazz Times	(favourable)
Sun Herald	(favourable)

Jazz Times stated "With moods playful to passionate and players in a relaxed goodtime frame of mind, it's a perfect party disc." Don Adderton of the Sun Herald wrote "When you surround a master artist with a strong supporting cast, usually great things happen. On this second outing, Ramsey Lewis scores big on Urban Knights II (GRP)." Adderton added "Still the master craftsman, Lewis leads this all-star aggregation rampaging into funk, jazz, rhythm-and-blues and Latin-flavored ballads." Don Heckman of the Los Angeles Times found that "The music that results can perhaps best be described as rhythm & jazz--bits and pieces of improvising from Lewis and the horn players juxtaposed against insistent, funk-driven rhythms. South African Butler, especially on the tracks in which he sings ("South African Jam" and "Brazilian Rain," especially), brings a seductive world-music ambience to the proceedings." Jonathan Widran of AllMusic called the album a "Maurice White-produced exercise in easy funk and potent, machine generated urban grooves."

== Track listing ==
No.	Title	Writer(s)	Length
1.	"Scirroco"	Bill Meyers, Maurice White	4:03
2.	"Get Up"	Ramsey Lewis, Frayne Lewis, Kevin Randolph	3:47
3.	"Come Dance with Me"	Karen Boyd, Frayne Lewis, Kevin Randolph	4:01
4.	"South African Jam"	Jonathan Butler	4:51
5.	"Brazilian Rain"	Sonny Emory, Morris Pleasure	4:19
6.	"Interlude #1"	Ramsey Lewis	0:35
7.	"Summer Nights"	Bill Meyers, Jimi Randolph, Maurice White	5:32
8.	"Tell Me Why"	Jonathan Butler, Bill Meyers, Kevin Williams	4:19
9.	"Urban Paradise"	Ramsey Lewis, Frayne Lewis, Kevin Randolph	4:23
10.	"Drama"	James Cornwell, Kevin Guillaume	3:47
11.	"Step by Step"	Ramsey Lewis, Frayne Lewis, Kevin Randolph	4:01
12.	"The Promise"	Bill Meyers, Ross Vannelli, Maurice White	4:10
13.	"Interlude #2"	Ramsey Lewis	2:02
14.	"Dawn"	Kevin Randolph	4:38

== Charts ==
Chart performance for Urban Knights II
Chart (1997)	Peak position
US Top Jazz Albums (Billboard)	7
US Top Contemporary Jazz Albums (Billboard)	5
US Heatseekers Albums (Billboard)	48
UK Jazz Albums (Official Charts Company)	24

== Personnel ==
- Gerald Albright – soprano saxophone
- Najee – flute, saxophone, soprano saxophone
- Frayne Lewis – keyboards
- Ramsey Lewis – piano, electric piano
- Mike Logan – keyboards
- Bill Meyers – synthesizer, backing vocals, Fender Rhodes
- Jimi Randolph – synthesizer
- Kevin Randolph – keyboards, synthesizer bass
- Jonathan Butler – guitar, vocals, backing vocals
- Sheldon Reynolds – guitar, backing vocals
- Morris Pleasure – bass
- Chuck Webb – bass
- Verdine White – bass
- Sonny Emory – drums
- Tony Carpenter – percussion
- Paulinho Da Costa – percussion
- Karen Boyd – backing vocals
- Carl Carwell – backing vocals
- Theresa Davis – backing vocals
- Valerie Mayo – backing vocals
- Maurice White – backing vocals
- Maggie Brown – female vocal on “Come Dance with Me”
