= September Rain =

September Rain may refer to:

- "September Rain", a song from George Howard's 1986 album Love Will Follow
- "September Rain", a song from Katey Sagal's 1994 album Well...
- "September Rain", a chapter from the first volume of the 2002 manga The Kurosagi Corpse Delivery Service
- September Rain, a 2005 book by Seymour Mayne

== See also ==
- September in the Rain (disambiguation)
