= Love and Understanding (disambiguation) =

"Love and Understanding" is a 1991 song by the singer Cher.

Love and Understanding may also refer to:

- Love and Understanding (Jimmy Heath album), 1973
- Love and Understanding (George Howard album), 1992
- Love & Understanding, 1976 Kool & the Gang album
