= Get on the Bus (soundtrack) =

Get on the Bus: Music from and Inspired by the Motion Picture

Soundtrack album by Various artists
- Released: October 8, 1996
- Genre: R&B; hip-hop; soul
- Length: 63:04
- Label: Interscope
- Producer: Various

Professional ratings
Review scores
Source	Rating
AllMusic	3/5 stars
Muzik	(8/10)

Get on the Bus: Music from and Inspired by the Motion Picture is the soundtrack to the 1996 feature film Get on the Bus, released in October 1996 on Interscope Records. The soundtrack reached No. 38 on the Billboard Top R&B/Hip-Hop Albums chart.

== Singles ==
Curtis Mayfield's "New World Order" peaked at No. 14 on the Billboard Adult R&B Airplay chart.

== Track listing ==
No.	Title	Writer(s)	Artist	Length
1.	"Shabooyah (Roll Call)"		The Bus Crew: Mike (Steve White), Evan, Jr. a.k.a. "Smooth" and Evan (De'Aundre Bonds and Thomas Jefferson Byrd), Gary (Roger Guenveur Smith), Xavier (Hill Harper), Jamal (Gabriel Casseus), and Jeremiah a.k.a. "Pop" (Ossie Davis)	1:43
2.	"Destiny Is Calling"	Keith Elam	Guru featuring Permanent Revolution	4:14
3.	"Tonite's the Nite"	Douglas Davis, Kareem Davis, Tarsha Jones	Doug E. Fresh	4:26
4.	"The Remedy"	Lonnie Lynn, Kamaal Fareed, Ali Shaheed Muhammad, James Yancey	A Tribe Called Quest featuring Common	4:32
5.	"Girl You Need a Change of Mind"	Leonard Caston Jr., Anita Poree	D'Angelo	4:08
6.	"Redemption Song"	Bob Marley	Stevie Wonder	3:46
7.	"New World Order"	Brian Fleming, Curtis Mayfield, Raimundo Thomas	Curtis Mayfield	6:34
8.	"Over a Million Strong"	Raymond Jones	The Neville Brothers	4:40
9.	"My Life Is in Your Hands"	Kirk Franklin	God's Property featuring Kirk Franklin	5:36
10.	"I Love My Woman"	Raymond Jones	Marvin Davis	4:28
11.	"Cruisin'"	Roxanne Seeman, Philip Bailey, Sonny Emory, Morris Pleasure	Earth, Wind & Fire	5:42
12.	"Welcome"	Raymond Jones	Marc Dorsey	5:05
13.	"Coming Home to You"	Karen Anderson, Chauncey Hannibal, Markell Riley, Teddy Riley	BLACKstreet	4:48
14.	"Ayinde's Speech"		Ayinde Jean-Baptiste	3:22
