= Attitude Adjustment =

Attitude Adjustment may refer to:

- Attitude Adjustment (band), American crossover thrash band
- Attitude Adjustment (George Howard album), 1996
- Attitude Adjustment (Buzzcocks album), 2026
- "Attitude Adjustment" (song), a 1984 single by Hank Williams Jr.
- "Attitude Adjustment", a song by Aerosmith from Nine Lives
- Attitude Adjustment, a version of a wrestling fireman's carry takeover, used by John Cena
