= In the Name of Love =

In the Name of Love may refer to:

== Music ==
=== Albums ===
- In the Name of Love (Earth, Wind & Fire album), 1996
- In the Name of Love (Peggy Lee album), 1964
- In the Name of Love (Thompson Twins album), 1982
- In the Name of Love (Yasmien Kurdi album), 2005
- In the Name of Love: Artists United for Africa, a 2004 album by various artists

=== Songs ===
- "In the Name of Love" (Martin Garrix and Bebe Rexha song), 2016
- "In the Name of Love" (Monika Kuszyńska song), 2015
- "In the Name of Love" (Thompson Twins song), 1982
- "In the Name of Love" (Earth, Wind & Fire song), 1996
- "Pride (In the Name of Love)", a 1984 song by U2
- "Vo Ime Na Ljubovta" ("In the Name of Love"), a 2008 song by Tamara Todevska, Vrčak and Adrian Gaxha
- "In the Name of Love", a 2000 song by Eriko Imai
- "In the Name of Love", a 1991 song by Rick Astley from Free
- "In the Name of Love", a 2016 song by Delta Goodrem from Wings of the Wild

== Film and television ==
- In the Name of Love (1925 film), an American film
- In the Name of Love: A Texas Tragedy, a 1995 Fox Network made-for-TV film
- In the Name of Love, a 2003 documentary film by Yana Gorskaya
- In the Name of Love (2008 film), an Indonesian film
- In the Name of Love (2011 film), a Philippine film
- In the Name of Love (2012 film), a Vietnamese film
- In the Name of Love, a 2021 Indian documentary film by Sudipto Sen
- In the Name of Love (TV series), a 2014 Chinese television series
- "In the Name of Love" (Happy Days), a 1974 television episode

== See also ==
- In the Name of Love Tour, by Diana Ross
- "Stop! In the Name of Love", a 1965 song by the Supremes
