= This Is Love (Lee Ritenour album) =

Studio album by Lee Ritenour
- Released: 1998
- Recorded: 1997–1998
- Studio: Sunset Sound (Hollywood, CA); Starlight Studios (Los Angeles, CA)
- Genre: Jazz
- Length: 49:39
- Label: GRP Records
- Producer: Lee Ritenour; Don Murray

Lee Ritenour chronology
A Twist of Jobim (1997)	This Is Love (1998)	Two Worlds (1999)

This Is Love is a studio album by American guitarist Lee Ritenour released in 1998 on GRP Records. The album reached No. 4 on the Billboard Contemporary Jazz Albums chart.

== Overview ==
Artists such as Lisa Fischer and Phil Perry appear upon the album.

== Covers ==
Ritenour covers "Alfie's Theme" by Sonny Rollins and "Baltimore" by Randy Newman on the album.

== Critical reception ==
Professional ratings
Review scores
Source	Rating
AllMusic	4.5/5 stars

AllMusic noted that Ritenour "has grown as a mature jazz artist on this album".

== Track listing ==
All tracks are written by Lee Ritenour, unless otherwise noted.

No.	Title	Writer(s)	Length
1.	"This is Love"		4:47
2.	"Mr. Papa"		4:41
3.	"Can You Feel It?"		5:20
4.	"Dream Away"		4:28
5.	"Alfie's Theme"	Sonny Rollins	6:01
6.	"And You Know That… I Love You"		5:18
7.	"Baltimore"	Randy Newman	4:53
8.	"Ooh-Yeah"		3:50
9.	"Street Runner"	Sony Rollins	7:36
10.	"Dreamwalk"		5:25
11.	"Pavane"	Gabriel Faure	6:45
Total length:			59:04

== Personnel ==
Musicians and vocalists

- Lee Ritenour – synthesizers (1–4, 6–8), guitars (1–9, 11), bass (1, 7, 8), drum programming (1–4, 7, 8), acoustic guitars (10)
- Bob James – Fender Rhodes (3)
- Ronnie Foster – Hammond B3 organ (5, 9), organ bass (5)
- Alan Pasqua – Fender Rhodes (6), acoustic piano (9–11)
- Melvin Lee Davis – bass (2–4, 11), bass pops (8)
- James Genus – electric bass (6), acoustic bass (9, 10)
- Sonny Emory – drums (2–10)
- Dave Weckl – drums (11)
- Paulinho da Costa – percussion (3, 4, 6, 7, 11), timbales (7)
- Larry Williams – saxophones (1, 9), keyboards (2, 4, 6, 9), synthesizers (3, 8), flute (3, 8), alto saxophone (5)
- Bill Evans – tenor saxophone (5, 9), soprano saxophone (6)
- Ernie Watts – tenor saxophone (11)
- Bill Reichenbach Jr. – trombone (1–3, 5, 8, 9)
- Gary Grant – trumpet (1–3, 5, 8, 9)
- Jerry Hey – trumpet (1–3, 5, 8, 9), flugelhorn (2)
- Ralph Morrison – violin (7, 10, 11)
- Frank Becker – additional string sounds (7), synthesizers (10, 11), programming (11)
- Phil Perry – vocals (4)
- Lisa Fischer – vocals (7)

Music arrangements

- Lee Ritenour – arrangements, BGV arrangements (4)
- Jerry Hey – horn arrangements (1, 5, 9), additional horn arrangements (3, 8), additional synthesizer arrangements (3, 6, 8)
- Phil Perry – BGV arrangements (4)
- Frank Becker – arrangements (10)

=== Production ===
- Michael Fagien – executive producer
- Mark Wexler – executive producer
- Lee Ritenour – executive producer, producer, additional engineer
- Don Murray – producer, recording, mixing, mastering
- Bryan Aee – additional engineer
- Doug Bohem – assistant engineer
- Kevin Dean – assistant engineer
- Tom Nellan – assistant engineer
- Paul Read – assistant engineer
- Robert Vosgien – digital editing at CMS Mastering (Pasadena, CA)
- Paul May – additional technical assistance
- David McEowan – mastering assistant
- Capitol Studios (Hollywood, CA) – mastering location
- Phil Shackleton – computer technical support, music transcription, music copyist
- Sari Zee – production coordinator
- Patricia Lie – art direction, design
- Catherine Ledner – photography
- Theodora Kuslan – release coordinator

Track information and credits adapted from the album's liner notes.

== Charts ==
Chart (1993)	Peak position
US Contemporary Jazz Albums (Billboard)	4
