= Rising Sun (Najee album) =

Studio album by Najee
- Released: 2007
- Genre: Jazz
- Length: 47:46
- Label: Heads Up
- Producer: Najee, Chris Davis, James Lloyd, John Grant & Phil Davis

Najee chronology
My Point of View (2005)	Rising Sun (2007)	Mind Over Matter (2009)

Rising Sun is a studio album by American jazz saxophonist and flautist, Najee.

== Critical reception ==
Professional ratings
Review scores
Source	Rating
Allmusic	4/5 stars
All About Jazz	3.5/5 stars

Jonathan Widran of AllMusic says in reference to the track "Moody's Mood for Love", "Straight-ahead jazz critics have found it easy to dismiss Najee as a groove happy lightweight over the years, but tracks like this -- and so much of the powerful playing on this disc -- prove once and for all that he's a serious jazz player. Who just happens to like commercial R&B and play it like nobody's business."

Jeff Winbush of All About Jazz gives the album 3½ out of 5 stars and says, "Najee's Rising Sun is stylish and sophisticated, and the fact that it should be very, very popular doesn't diminish the fact that it's a great listen all the way through."

Smooth Jazz concludes their review with, "Najee is the mellow romantic side of smooth jazz, authentic."

Brian Soergel of Jazz Times begins his review with, "Soprano saxophonist Najee has made it to his 10th solo CD, which means he must be doing something right."

Ian Cooke reviews for The Urban Music Scene and writes that, "Blending various shades of straight-ahead as well as contemporary jazz, classic R&B and even indie rock, this set continues Najee’s innovative ideas."

== Track listing ==
No.	Title	Writer(s)	Length
1.	"Clarity"	John Mayer	4:23
2.	"Brazilian Affair"	Chris Davis	4:14
3.	"Child at Heart"	Jerome Najee Rasheed; Phil Davis	4:15
4.	"Can't Wait Another Minute"	Chris Davis	4:12
5.	"Come What May" (featuring James Lloyd)	Jerome Najee Rasheed; James Lloyd	4:49
6.	"Out of a Dream"	Jerome Najee Rasheed; James Lloyd	4:55
7.	"Moody's Mood for Love"	James Moody; Jimmy McHugh; Dorothy Fields	4:54
8.	"Still in Love"	Chris Davis	4:15
9.	"Romance the Night" (featuring Phil Perry)	Chris Davis; Phil Perry	4:07
10.	"Smooth Sailing"	Chris Davis	3:34
11.	"Rising Sun"	Chris Davis	4:08
Total length:			47:46

All track information and credits taken from the album liner notes.
