= Roles (Joe Sample album) =

Studio album by Joe Sample
- Released: 1987
- Studio: Baby'O Recorders and Soundcastle (Hollywood, California)
- Genre: Jazz
- Length: 47:51
- Label: MCA
- Producer: Wilton Felder; Joe Sample

Professional ratings
Review scores
Source	Rating
AllMusic	2/5 stars

Roles is a studio album by American pianist keyboardist Joe Sample, released in 1987 on MCA Records. The album peaked at No. 8 on the Billboard Contemporary Jazz Charts.

== Track listing ==
Adapted from album's text.

No.	Title	Writer(s)	Length
1.	"Woman You're Drivin' Me Mad"	Joe Sample	5:09
2.	"The Gifted"	Joe Sample	4:47
3.	"Friends and Lovers"	Joe Sample	5:44
4.	"Ego Mania Mambo"	Joe Sample	5:05
5.	"Fortune Hunter"	Joe Sample	6:25
6.	"Ship of Fools"	Joe Sample	5:59
7.	"Passionist"	Joe Sample	7:33

== Personnel ==
Adapted from album's text.

Production

- Joe Sample – producer
- Wilton Felder – producer
- F. Byron Clark – engineer, mixing
- Glenn Kurtz – assistant engineer
- Liz Cluse – mix assistant
- Bernie Grundman – mastering at Bernie Grundman Mastering (Hollywood, California)
- Ceferino "Sonny" Abelardo – production coordinator
- Pamela Hope Lobue – production coordinator
- Kathleen Covert – art direction, design
- Mindas – cover photography

Musicians

- Joe Sample – acoustic piano, electronic keyboards
- Dr. George Shaw – synthesizer programming
- Dean Parks – guitars
- Rick Zunigar – guitar solo (6)
- Abraham Laboriel – bass
- Sonny Emory – drums
- Lenny Castro – percussion
- Bobby Hutcherson – marimba solo (4), vibraphone (7)
- Bill Green – flute (2, 3), reeds (5, 6)
- Plas Johnson – flute (2, 3), reeds (5, 6)
- Ronald Brown – reeds (5, 6)
- Bill Reichenbach Jr. – trombone (5, 6)
- Gary Grant – flute (2, 3), trumpet (5, 6)
- Sal Marquez – trumpet (2, 3, 5, 6), muted trumpet (2), trumpet solo (5)
- Kathy Brown, Voncielle Faggett, Jim Gilstrap and Michael Tompkins – voices (1)
