= Tokyo Blue =

Studio album by Najee
- Released: March 20, 1990
- Genre: Jazz
- Length: 47:39
- Label: Capitol
- Producer: Fareed Abdul Haqq

Najee chronology
Day by Day (1988)	Tokyo Blue (1990)	Just an Illusion (1992)

Professional ratings
Review scores
Source	Rating
AllMusic	3/5 stars

Tokyo Blue is Najee's third album, released by Capitol Records in 1990.

== Critical reception ==
Jonathan Widran of AllMusic writes, "Immensely pleasurable, a fun listen from beginning to end."

Smooth Jazz Therapy writes of Tokyo Blue, "The way it blended jazz with R & B, placed him right at the top of his urban jazz game and his judicious use of featured vocalists was starting a trend in smooth jazz which has endured to this day."

Yumi L. Wilson of AP News reports that, "Najee won best jazz album for his Tokyo Blue at the 1991 Soul Train Music Awards.

- See original reviews for full articles. Links can be found in the references section of this article.

== Charts ==
Top Contemporary Jazz Albums No. 1

Billboard 200 No. 63

== Track listing ==
No.	Title	Writer(s)	Length
1.	"Talkin'"	Jerome Najee Rasheed; Morris Pleasure	5:52
2.	"Stay"	Jerome Najee Rasheed; Morris Pleasure	5:11
3.	"Cruise Control"	Jerome Najee Rasheed; Artie Reynolds; Alex Bugnon; Charles Bell	5:53
4.	"I'll Be Good to You"	Robin Smith; Stephanie Spruill	4:31
5.	"Nation's Call"	Jerome Najee Rasheed	1:04
6.	"Tokyo Blue"	Jerome Najee Rasheed; Morris Pleasure; Rachel Nicolazzo	4:37
7.	"My Old Friend"	Steve George; John Lang; Richard Page	4:55
8.	"Buenos Aires"	Jerome Najee Rasheed; Morris Pleasure	5:51
9.	"Superwoman (Where Were You When I Needed You)"	Stevie Wonder	5:04
10.	"Only at Night"	Jerome Najee Rasheed; Morris Pleasure	4:41
Total length:			47:39

All track information and credits taken from the CD liner notes.
