= Midnight Mood (George Howard album) =

Studio album by George Howard
- Released: 1998
- Studio: Gallery, Los Angeles, CA; Silent Sound Studios, Atlanta, GA
- Genre: Jazz
- Length: 46:30
- Label: GRP Records
- Producer: George Howard, Morris Pleasure

George Howard chronology
The Very Best of George Howard and Then Some (1997)	Midnight Mood (1998)	There's a Riot Goin' On (1998)

Midnight Mood is the thirteenth studio album by jazz saxophonist George Howard, released in 1998 on GRP Records. The album reached No. 5 on the Billboard Contemporary Jazz Albums chart and No. 7 on the Billboard Jazz Albums chart.

== Critical reception ==
Professional ratings
Review scores
Source	Rating
AllMusic	3/5 stars

Alex Henderson of AllMusic gave the album a 3 out of 5 star rating. Henderson exclaimed "For George Howard, Midnight Mood is business as usual, and not in a good sense...From the vacuous, knee-jerk elevator music of "Still in Love" and "Within Your Eyes" to a robotic cover of D'Angelo's R&B hit "Smooth," Howard sees to it that every note is in place and is careful to avoid any type of spontaneity. "
