= Love Will Follow =

Studio album by George Howard
- Released: 1986
- Genre: Jazz
- Producer: George Howard

George Howard chronology
Dancing in the Sun (1986)	Love Will Follow (1986)	A Nice Place to Be (1986)

Love Will Follow is the fourth studio album released by jazz saxophonist George Howard in 1986 on TBA/GRP Records. The album reached No. 1 on the Billboard Traditional Jazz Albums chart and No. 22 on the Billboard Top R&B Albums chart.

== Covers ==
Howard covered Kenny Loggins' "Love Will Follow" from his 1985 album Vox Humana.

== Critical reception ==
Professional ratings
Review scores
Source	Rating
AllMusic	4/5 stars

AllMusic rated the album four out of five stars.

== Track listing ==
No.	Title	Writer(s)	Length
1.	"Love Will Follow"	Kenny Loggins, Tom Snow	6:18
2.	"September Rain"	George Howard, Phillip Woo	5:29
3.	"Slow Walking"	George Howard, Wayne Linsay	4:16
4.	"The Raiders"	George Howard	4:59
5.	"It Can't Be Forever"	George Howard, Ron Smith	5:18
6.	"That's Just What It Is"	George Howard	3:44
7.	"Come With Me"	Regina Wernick	3:50
