= Reflections (George Howard album) =

Studio album by George Howard
- Released: 1988
- Genre: Jazz
- Length: 42:14
- Producer: George Howard

George Howard chronology
A Nice Place to Be (1987)	Reflections (1988)	Personal (1990)

Reflections is the sixth studio album by jazz saxophonist George Howard released in 1988 on MCA Records. The album reached No. 1 on the Billboard Contemporary Jazz Albums chart and No. 33 on the Billboard Top R&B Albums chart.

== Overview ==
Reflections was produced by George Howard. Artists such as George Duke, Nathan East, and Robert Brookins appear on the album.

== Accolades ==
Howard received a Grammy nomination for the album in the category of Best R&B Instrumental Performance (Orchestra, Group or Soloist).

== Critical reception ==
Professional ratings
Review scores
Source	Rating
AllMusic	4/5 stars

AllMusic gave the album a 4 out of 5 star rating."

== Track listing ==
Track no.	Song title	Songwriter(s)	Length
1	Too Bad	Robert Brookins	06:05
2	Reflections		05:01
3	Funk It Out		06:06
4	One Love (featuring Johnny Gill)	Ray Griffin, Daryl Simmons	04:50
5	Late Night		05:26
6	Love Will Conquer All	Greg Phillinganes, Lionel Richie, Cynthia Weil	05:37
7	Let's Pretend	Steve George, Jay Graydon, John Lang, Richard Page	04:44
8	Attitude	George Howard	04:25
9	I Like This Groove	George Howard	05:32
