= September in the Rain (disambiguation) =

"September in the Rain" is a 1937 American song.

September in the Rain may also refer to:

- September in the Rain (film), 1937 Merrie Melodies cartoon directed by I. Freleng
- September in the Rain (album), 1960 studio album by American singer Dinah Washington

== See also ==
- September Rain (disambiguation)
