= When Love Goes Wrong =

Single by Earth, Wind & Fire

from the album In the Name of Love
- Released: 1997
- Genre: Funk, R&B
- Length: 4:20
- Label: Rhino
- Songwriters: Philip Bailey; Andrew Klippel; Alan Glass
- Producer: Maurice White

Earth, Wind & Fire singles chronology
"Revolution" (1997)	"When Love Goes Wrong" (1997)	"September '99" (1999)

"When Love Goes Wrong" is a song by American R&B band Earth, Wind & Fire, released as a single in 1997 on Rhino Records from the album In the Name of Love. It reached No. 33 on the Billboard Adult R&B Airplay chart.

== Overview ==
"When Love Goes Wrong" was produced by Maurice White and written by Philip Bailey, Andrew Klippel and Alan Glass. The song is from Earth, Wind and Fire's 1997 studio album In the Name of Love.

== Critical reception ==
David Stubbs of Uncut proclaimed "Philip Bailey shows he's chockful to the falsetto brim with the milk of human soulfulness" on the tune. Geoffrey Himes of The Washington Post found that "on the slower romantic ballads such as When Love Goes Wrong and Cruising, Bailey's impossibly high tenor sounds as if it's in a permanent swoon.". Omoronke Idowu of Vibe called the song "a silky celestial ballad". Al Rasheed Dauda of Vox stated "Philip Bailey and his unrivalled falsetto blesses the ballads When Love Goes Wrong and Cruisin'. Steve Jones of USA Today also declared that "the mellow grooves of Cruisin' and When Love Goes Wrong showcase Philip Bailey's still brilliant falsetto".

== Charts ==
Chart (1997)	Peak position
US Billboard Adult R&B Airplay	33
