= Do I Ever Cross Your Mind? =

Studio album by George Howard
- Released: 1992
- Genre: Jazz
- Length: 53:26
- Label: GRP Records
- Producer: Ray Griffin; Deron Johnson; George Howard

George Howard chronology
Love and Understanding (1991)	Do I Ever Cross Your Mind? (1992)	When Summer Comes (1993)

Do I Ever Cross Your Mind? is the ninth studio album by jazz saxophonist George Howard, released in 1992 on GRP Records. The album reached No. 3 on the Billboard Contemporary Jazz Albums chart and No. 33 on the Billboard Top R&B Albums chart.

Do I Ever Cross Your Mind? was executively produced by Larry Rosen and Dave Grusin. Artists such as James Ingram, Phil Perry and Stanley Clarke appeared on the album.

== Critical reception ==
Professional ratings
Review scores
Source	Rating
AllMusic	4/5 stars

Steve Aldrich of AllMusic, in a 4 out of 5 star review, called the album "A solid, masterful set of funk/fusion."

== Tracklisting ==
No.	Title	Writer(s)	Length
1.	"Just The Way I Feel"	Rayford Griffin, George Howard	05:20
2.	"Try Again"	George Howard, Sam Sims	05:00
3.	"Cross Your Mind"	David Cochrane, Dianne Quander	04:54
4.	"Stay Here With Me"	Ronnie Garrett, Rex Rideout	04:59
5.	"Shadow"	Attala Zane Giles, Tony Haynes	05:41
6.	"Partly Cloudy"	George Howard, Deron Johnson	05:42
7.	"Spirit"	Traditional	04:34
8.	"Modern Love"	Rayford Griffin	05:10
9.	"Jo Jo"	Marcus Miller	06:21
10.	"Mind Bender"	Randy Hoexter	05:46

== Credits ==
- Arranged By – George Howard, Leonard "Doc" Gibbs* (tracks: 7), Rayford Griffin
- Coordinator [Project] – Michelle Bligh, Xavier Hargrove
- Costume Designer [Wardrobe, Assisted By] – Carolyn Spears
- Costume Designer [Wardrobe] – Fred Segal (2), George Gimball
- Creative Director [GRP] – Andy Baltimore
- Design [Graphic Design] – Andy Ruggirello, Dan Serrano, David Gibb, Scott Johnson (14), Sonny Mediana
- Engineer – Bobby Brooks (tracks: 5, 9, 10)
- Engineer [Assistant] – Mick Stern
- Engineer [Tracking] – Rob Disner
- Engineer [Tracking], Programmed By [Album] – Brad Buxer
- Executive-Producer – Dave Grusin, Larry Rosen
- Make-Up – LaLette Littlejohn
- Management [Production Manager] – Peter Jenkins (5)
- Mastered By – Steve Hall
- Mixed By [Assistant Mixing Engineer] – Eric Stitt Greedy*
- Mixed By [Mixing Engineer] – Bobby Brooks
- Photography By – Bobby Holland
- Producer – Rayford Griffin (tracks: 1 to 6, 8 to 10)
- Producer [Post Production By] – Joseph Doughney, Michael Landy
- Producer, Arranged By – Deron Johnson (tracks: 6), George Howard
- Programmed By [Additional Programming] – Houston Singletary
