= Steppin' Out (George Howard album) =

Stepping Out

Studio album by George Howard
- Released: 1984
- Studio: Sorcerer SOund, New York, NY; Weddington Studios, North Hollywood, CA
- Genre: Jazz
- Length: 35:51
- Label: Palo Alto Records
- Producer: Al Evers

George Howard chronology
Asphalt Gardens (1982)	Stepping Out (1984)	Dancing in the Sun (1985)

Professional ratings
Review scores
Source	Rating
Allmusic	2/5 stars

Steppin' Out is the second studio album of jazz saxophonist George Howard, released in 1984 on Palo Alto Records. This album peaked at No. 9 on the Billboard Top Jazz Albums chart and No. 39 on the Billboard Top R&B Albums chart.

== Track listing ==
1. "Steppin' Out" (Howard) - 6:15
2. "Philly Talk" (Burke, Gant, Howard, Williams) - 5:06
3. "A Tear of Spring" (Howard) - 5:34
4. "Dr. Rock" (Gant, Howard) - 4:40
5. "Human Nature" (Bettis, Porcaro) - 5:28
6. "Sweet Dreams (Are Made of This)" (Lennox, Stewart) - 3:48
7. "Dream Ride" (Gant, Howard, Reklaw) - 5:00

== Personnel ==
- Keni Burke, Nathan East - bass guitar
- Leon "Ndugu" Chancler - percussion, drums, timbales
- Dean Gant - producer, synthesizer, arranger, keyboards, mixing
- George Howard - percussion, arranger, sax (soprano), producer, mixing
- Curtis King, Brenda White - vocals (background)
- David Williams - guitar

Production:

- Andy Baltimore - creative director
- Joan Ingoldsby Brown, Scott Johnson, Sonny Mediana, Andy Ruggirello, Dan Serrano - design
- Katy Cavanaugh, Herb Wong - art direction
- Joseph Doughney, Michael Landy, Adam Zelinka - post production
- Al Evers - executive producer
- Joe Ferla, Wally Grant - engineer, mixing
- George Horn - mastering
- Doreen Kalcich, Michael Pollard - production coordination
- Darryl Pitt - photography

== Charts ==
Chart (1984)	Peak position
US Pop Albums (Billboard)	178
US Jazz Albums (Billboard)	9
US R&B Albums (Billboard)	39
