= A Home Far Away =

Studio album by George Howard
- Released: 1994
- Genre: Jazz
- Length: 48:26
- Label: GRP Records
- Producer: Rex Rideout; George Howard

George Howard chronology
When Summer Comes (1993)	A Home Far Away (1994)	Attitude Adjustment (1996)

A Home Far Away is a studio album by jazz saxophonist George Howard, released in 1994 on GRP Records. The album reached No. 2 on the Billboard Contemporary Jazz Albums chart, No. 3 on the Billboard Jazz Albums chart and No. 28 on the Billboard Top R&B Albums chart.

A Home Far Away was executively produced by Larry Rosen and Dave Grusin. Artists such as percussionist Paulinho DaCosta, guitarist Paul Jackson Jr. and steelpannist Ken "Professor" Philmore appeared on the album.

== Critical reception ==
Professional ratings
Review scores
Source	Rating
AllMusic	3/5 stars

Scott Yanow of AllMusic gave the album a 3 out of 5 star rating. Yanow proclaimed "This set is only passable as background music and will immediately disappoint anyone who gives it a close listen".

== Tracklisting ==
No.	Title	Writer(s)	Length
1.	"Miracle"	George Howard, Sam Sims, Daryl Smith	4:58
2.	"If You Were Mine"	Will Downing, Rex Rideout	4:59
3.	"Doria"	George Howard	5:00
4.	"Until Tomorrow"	George Howard, Rex Rideout	4:09
5.	"You Can Make The Story Right"	Wayne Brathwaite, Gabrielle Goodman	5:00
6.	"Grover's Groove"	George Howard	5:19
7.	"No Ordinary Love"	Sade Adu, Stuart Matthewman	4:48
8.	"A Home Far Away"	Carl Burnett, George Howard	5:21
9.	"For Our Fathers"	George Howard	4:42
10.	"Renewal"	Newton Allen, Mark Ellis Stephens	4:17

== Credits ==
- Art Direction – Dan Serrano, Hollis King
- Coordinator [GRP Production, Assistant] – Joseph Moore (3)
- Coordinator [GRP Production] – Cara Bridgins
- Creative Director [GRP] – Andy Baltimore
- Design [Graphic] – Alba Acevedo, Freddie Paloma, Laurie Goldman
- Executive-Producer – Dave Grusin, Larry Rosen
- Executive-Producer [Album] – George Howard
- Mastered By – Steve Hall (tracks: 3 to 10), Ted Jensen (tracks: 1, 2)
- Mixed By – Doug DeAngelis
- Photography By – Donn Thompson
- Post Production – Joseph Doughney, Michael Landy
- Production Manager [GRP Production Director, Assistant] – Lilian Barbuti
- Production Manager [GRP Production Director] – Sonny Mediana
- Recorded By – Doug DeAngelis (tracks: 6, 9), John Chamberlain (tracks: 1 to 5, 7, 8, 10), Leon Johnson (tracks: 3, 9)
- Soprano Saxophone – George Howard
