= Personal (George Howard album) =

Studio album by George Howard
- Released: 1990
- Genre: Jazz
- Length: 53:12
- Producer: Larry Blackmon; George Duke; Attala Zane Giles; Preston Glass; George Howard; Cornelius Mims; Rex Salas

George Howard chronology
Reflections (1988)	Personal (1990)	Love and Understanding (1991)

Personal is the seventh studio album by jazz saxophonist George Howard, released in 1990 on MCA Records. The album reached No. 3 on the Billboard Contemporary Jazz Albums chart and No. 39 on the Billboard Top R&B Albums chart.

Personal was executively produced by Howard along with Louis Silas Jr. Artists such as Syreeta, George Duke and Preston Glass appear on the album.

== Critical reception ==
Professional ratings
Review scores
Source	Rating
AllMusic	3/5 stars

Johnathan Widran of AllMusic said "Personal is a must buy for sax lovers and instrumental fans who like to shake their booties."

== Track listing ==
Track no.	Song title	Songwriter(s)	Length
1	I Want You for Myself	Attala Zane Giles, George Howard	05:29
2	Shower You With My Love	Attala Zane Giles	05:00
3	Uptown	Preston Glass, George Howard	06:48
4	You and Me	Ed Howard, Keith Rawls, Freddy Boy Sawyer	06:11
5	I'm in Effect	Wayne Edwards, Attala Zane Giles, Angel Rogers	05:03
6	You Only Come Out at Night	George Howard, Cornelius Mims, Rex Salas	05:26
7	Personally	Attala Zane Giles, Tony Haynes, George Howard	04:10
8	Fakin' the Feeling	Derek Bramble, Cliff Dawson, Preston Glass	05:11
9	Got It Goin' On	Kevin Dorsey, Attala Zane Giles, George Howard	04:44
10	Piano in the Dark	Scott Cutler, Jeff Hull, Brenda Russell	05:10
