= Urban Knights III =

Studio album by Urban Knights
- Released: February 29, 2000
- Genre: Jazz
- Length: 51:39
- Label: Narada
- Producer: Ramsey Lewis (Exec.), Frayne Lewis, Kevin Randolph

Urban Knights chronology
Urban Knights II (1997)	Urban Knights III (2000)	Urban Knights IV (2001)

Urban Knights III is the third studio album by the jazz group Urban Knights released in 2000 on Narada Records. The album reached No. 4 on the US Billboard Top Jazz Albums chart and No. 3 on the US Billboard Top Contemporary Jazz Albums chart.

== Overview ==
Ramsey Lewis executively produced the album with Frayne Lewis and Kevin Randolph also listed as producers. Artists such as Earl Klugh, The Staples, Dave Koz and Fareed Haque appeared on Urban Knights III. With the album also featuring covers of Robert Johnson's Sweet Home Chicago and 10cc's I'm Not in Love.

=== Singles ===
"Strung Out" peaked at No. 27 on the US Billboard Adult R&B Songs chart.

== Critical reception ==
Professional ratings
Review scores
Source	Rating
AllMusic	4/5 stars

Hilarie Grey of Jazz Times said "Ramsey Lewis' Urban Knights III exploits the urban sophistication and stylish blue roots of its Chicago setting".

Jonathan Widran of AllMusic wrote "On Urban Knights III, legendary pianist Ramsey Lewis reaches deeper, forgoing the all-star jam concepts of the first two Urban Knights projects (which featured everyone from the late Grover Washington, Jr. to producer Maurice White), and cultivating some of Chicago's most deserving local R&B and jazz talents...With such great young players, one wonders why Lewis couldn't resist the commercial potential of having Dave Koz simmer on "Dancing Angels" and having Earl Klugh and Fareed Haque engage in the playful, steel string-classical guitar duel "Gypsy." Great tunes, but they're bound to take the focus off the kids."

== Track listing ==
No.	Title	Writer(s)	Length
1.	"Dancing Angels"	William Kilgore	03:59
2.	"Do You Still Think About Me?"	Ira Antelis	04:00
3.	"Until We Meet Again"	Frayne Lewis, Ramsey Lewis, Kevin Randolph	04:55
4.	"The Gypsy"	Frayne Lewis, Ramsey Lewis, Sharay Reed	03:56
5.	"Strung Out"		04:20
6.	"Sweet Home Chicago"	Robert Johnson	03:52
7.	"You're the One for Me"	Ramsey Lewis	04:02
8.	"I'm Not in Love"	Graham Gouldman, Eric Stewart	04:50
9.	"Far and Away"	Ramsey Lewis, Kevin Randolph, Sharay Reed	04:10
10.	"Broken Mirrors"	Kevin Randolph	04:06
11.	"Midnight in Madrid"	Ramsey Lewis	05:25
12.	"You're the One for Me"	Ramsey Lewis	04:04

== Personnel ==
- Alejo Poveda: percussion
- Calvin Rodgers: snare drums
- Dave Koz: saxophone
- Earl Klugh: acoustic guitar
- Fareed Haque: acoustic guitar
- Hardeman: vocals
- Jeff Morrow: background vocals
- Keith Henderson: rhythm guitar
- Kevin Randolph: drum programming, keyboards
- Ramsey Lewis: Grand piano
- Sharay Reed: bass
- Tami: vocals
- The Staples: vocals
- Yvonne Gage: background vocals

=== Production ===
- Ramsey Lewis: Executive Producer
- Frayne Lewis: Arranger, Producer
- Kevin Randolph: Producer
- Danny Leake: Engineer, Mastering
- Mat Lejeune: Assistant Engineer
- Ok Hee Kim: Assistant Engineer
- Mark Bell: Assistant Engineer
- Mark Ruffin: Liner Notes
- Charles Bibbs: Illustrations
- Connie Gage: Design
