= In the Name of Love (Earth, Wind & Fire album) =

Studio album by Earth, Wind & Fire
- Released: July 22, 1997
- Recorded: 1996
- Studios: Sony Music Studios (Los Angeles, California); Sunset Sound Recorders and Andrew Klippel's house (Hollywood, California)
- Genres: R&B; soul; funk
- Length: 56:21
- Label: Rhino
- Producers: Maurice White; Philip Bailey; Alan Glass; Andrew Klippel

Earth, Wind & Fire chronology
Let's Groove: The Best of Earth, Wind & Fire (1996)	In the Name of Love (1997)	Greatest Hits (1998)

Reissue cover
- 2006 Reissue Cover

Singles from In the Name of Love
- 1. "In the Name of Love" Released: 1996; 2. "Revolution" Released: 1997; 3. "When Love Goes Wrong" Released: 1997; 4. "Change Your Mind" Released: 2006

In the Name of Love is the seventeenth studio album by Earth, Wind & Fire, released in July 1997 on Rhino Records. The album reached No. 19 on the UK R&B Albums chart and No. 25 on the Japanese Oricon Albums Chart.

== Overview ==
In the Name of Love was produced by EWF's leader Maurice White for Kalimba Productions. Originally, the album was released in Japan during 1996 as Avatar.

During October 2006, In the Name of Love was reissued on Maurice White's own label Kalimba Music. With the LP's reissue came three bonus tracks from Avatar being "Change Your Mind", "Take You to Heaven" and "Bahia".

== Covers ==
EWF covered the tune "Love Is Life" on the album. "Love Is Life" first appeared on the band 's 1971 self-titled debut LP.

== Appearances in other media ==
EWF went on to contribute the song "Cruisin'" to the soundtrack to the 1996 feature film Get On the Bus.

== Critical reception ==
Professional ratings
Review scores
Source	Rating
AllMusic	3.5/5 stars
The Guardian	4/5 stars
Entertainment Weekly	(B−)
USA Today	2.5/4 stars
Vibe	(favorable)
Washington Post	(favourable)
Vox	(6/10)
Stereo Review	4/5 stars
Uncut	3/5 stars
Rolling Stone	3/5 stars

With a 4/5 stars review, Dan Glaister of The Guardian called In The Name Of Love "a scorching album". Omoronke Idowu of Vibe wrote "In the Name of Love is like revisiting a fresh yet familiar face, one that soothes, satisfies, and makes you smile from the inside out. With a 6/10 review, Al Rasheed Dauda of Vox exclaimed "this album proves they're as potent as ever". Steve Jones of USA Today noted that EWF "shows it still has an edge to its funk".

David Stubbs of Uncut in a 3/5 stars review found, "In the Name of Love is never less than good, always less than vital". Alex Henderson of Allmusic in a 3.5/5 stars review proclaimed, "this excellent CD is unapologetically retro." Phyl Garland of Stereo Review in a 4/5 stars review remarked, "with this set of skillfully shaped songs, White has positioned Earth, Wind & Fire to move into the next century".

== Singles ==
"Change Your Mind" rose to No. 26 on the US Billboard Adult R&B Songs chart. "When Love Goes Wrong" also reached No. 33 on the US Billboard Adult R&B Songs chart. The title track also reached No. 9 on the Japanese Oricon Singles Chart.

== Track listing ==
=== Avatar ===
No.	Title	Writer(s)	Length
1.	"Keep It Real"	Melanie Andrews, Paul Minor, Morris Pleasure, Sheldon Reynolds, Maurice White	4:52
2.	"The Right Time"	Melanie Andrews, Paul Minor, Sheldon Reynolds, Maurice White	4:01
3.	"Feel U Up"	Kevin Guillaume, Ralph Hawkins, Jr., Damian Johnson, Paul Minor, Ralph Tresvant	4:02
4.	"Avatar"	Marcel East, Ralph Johnson	2:05
5.	"Cruising"	Philip Bailey, Sonny Emory, Morris Pleasure, Roxanne Seeman	5:41
6.	"Revolution (Just Evolution)"	James Bailey, Sonny Emory, Morris Pleasure, Maurice White	5:08
7.	"Round and Round"	Scott Mayo, Will Wheaton	3:52
8.	"Change Your Mind"	Bill Meyers, Brenda Russell, Maurice White	3:48
9.	"Love Is Life"	Wade Flemons, Maurice White, Don Whitehead	4:59
10.	"In the Name of Love"	Melanie Andrews, Morris Pleasure, Sheldon Reynolds, Betty Reynolds, Maurice White	4:48
11.	"Take You to Heaven"	Philip Bailey, Scott Mayo, Diane Quander	4:33
12.	"Rock It"	Philip Bailey, James Bailey, Sonny Emory, Morris Pleasure, Sheldon Reynolds, Verdine White	4:26
13.	"Bahia"	Sonny Emory, Morris Pleasure	1:49

=== In the Name of Love ===
No.	Title	Writer(s)	Length
1.	"Rock It"	Philip Bailey, James Bailey, Sonny Emory, Morris Pleasure, Sheldon Reynolds, Verdine White	4:26
2.	"In the Name of Love"	Melanie Andrews, Morris Pleasure, Sheldon Reynolds, Betty Reynolds, Maurice White	4:48
3.	"Revolution"	James Bailey, Sonny Emory, Morris Pleasure, Maurice White	5:08
4.	"When Love Goes Wrong"	Philip Bailey, Alan Glass, Andrew Klippel	4:48
5.	"Fill You Up"	Kevin Guillaume, Ralph Hawkins, Jr., Damian Johnson, Paul Minor, Ralph Tresvant	4:06
6.	"Right Time"	Melanie Andrews, Paul Minor, Sheldon Reynolds, Maurice White	4:02
7.	"Round and Round"	Scott Mayo, Wil Wheaton	3:54
8.	"Keep It Real"	Melanie Andrews, Paul Minor, Morris Pleasure, Sheldon Reynolds, Maurice White	4:51
9.	"Cruising"	Philip Bailey, Sonny Emory, Morris Pleasure, Roxanne Seeman	5:41
10.	"Love Is Life"	Wade Flemons, Maurice White, Don Whitehead	4:59
11.	"Avatar"	Marcel East, Ralph Johnson	2:09

=== 2006 Kalimba Reissue ===
No.	Title	Writer(s)	Length
1.	"Keep It Real"	Melanie Andrews, Paul Minor, Morris Pleasure, Sheldon Reynolds, Maurice White	4:52
2.	"Change Your Mind"	Bill Meyers, Brenda Russell, Maurice White	3:48
3.	"Love Is Life"	Wade Flemons, Maurice White, Don Whitehead	4:59
4.	"Fill You Up"	Kevin Guillaume, Ralph Hawkins, Jr., Damian Johnson, Paul Minor, Ralph Tresvant	4:02
5.	"Avatar"	Marcel East, Ralph Johnson	2:05
6.	"Revolution"	James Bailey, Sonny Emory, Morris Pleasure, Maurice White	5:08
7.	"Round and Round"	Scott Mayo, Wil Wheaton	3:52
8.	"Cruising"	Philip Bailey, Sonny Emory, Morris Pleasure, Roxanne Seeman	5:41
9.	"In the Name of Love"	Melanie Andrews, Morris Pleasure, Sheldon Reynolds, Betty Reynolds, Maurice White	4:48
10.	"The Right Time"	Melanie Andrews, Paul Minor, Sheldon Reynolds, Maurice White	4:01
11.	"Take You to Heaven"	Philip Bailey, Scott Mayo, Diane Quander	4:33
12.	"Rock It"	Philip Bailey, James Bailey, Sonny Emory, Morris Pleasure, Sheldon Reynolds, Verdine White	4:26
13.	"When Love Goes Wrong"	Philip Bailey, Alan Glass, Andrew Klippel	4:45
14.	"Bahia"	Sonny Emory, Morris Pleasure	1:49

== Credits ==
Earth, Wind & Fire

- Philip Bailey – lead vocals (1–4, 6, 8, 9), backing vocals
- Maurice White – backing vocals, lead vocals (2, 5, 10)
- Morris Pleasure – keyboards
- Sheldon Reynolds – guitars, backing vocals, lead vocals (2, 6–8)
- Verdine White – bass
- Sonny Emory – drums, backing vocals
- Ralph Johnson – percussion, backing vocals

EWF horns

- Scott Mayo – saxophones (1–3, 5, 7, 8, 10, 11)
- Reggie Young – trombone (2, 3, 7, 10)
- Ray Brown –trumpet (2, 3, 7, 10)

Additional musicians

- Jimi Randolph – programming (2, 6, 9, 10)
- Andrew Klippel – keyboards (4)
- Damian Johnson – keyboards (5)
- Paul Minor – keyboards (5, 6, 8)
- Marcel East – keyboards (11)
- Lenny Castro – percussion (1, 2, 8, 9)
- Paulinho da Costa – percussion (6, 11)
- David Romero – percussion (9)
- Bill Reichenbach Jr. – trombone (1, 5, 8)
- Gary Grant – trumpet (1, 5, 8), flugelhorn (1, 5, 8)
- Jerry Hey – trumpet (1, 5, 8), flugelhorn (1, 5, 8)
- Michael "Patches" Stewart – trumpet (2, 3, 7, 10)
- Sir James Bailey – backing vocals (1, 3)
- Carl Carwell – backing vocals (1–3, 5–10)
- Doni McCrary – backing vocals (4)
- Howard McCrary – backing vocals (4)
- James McCrary – backing vocals (4)
- Leon McCrary – backing vocals (4)
- Kevin Guillaume – backing vocals (5)
- Ralph Hawkins, Jr. – backing vocals (5)

Music arrangements

- Jerry Hey – horn arrangements (1, 5, 8)
- Bill Meyers – horn arrangements (2, 3, 7, 10), synth string arrangements (6), string arrangements (10)
- Howard McCrary – BGV arrangements (4)
- Kevin Guillaume – vocal arrangements (5)
- Ralph Hawkins, Jr. – vocal arrangements (5)
- Ralph Tresvant – vocal arrangements (5

=== Production ===
- Maurice White – producer, executive producer (4)
- Philip Bailey – producer (3, 4)
- Alan Glass – producer (4)
- Andrew Klippel – producer (4)
- Don Murray – recording, mixing (1–3, 5–10)
- Carmen Rizzo – mixing (4)
- Jerry Jordan – mixing (11), additional engineer
- Paul Klingberg – additional engineer
- Doug Bohem – assistant engineer
- Tim Boland – assistant engineer
- Tony Gonzales – assistant engineer
- Brian Soucy – assistant engineer
- Wally Traugott – mastering at Capitol Studios (Hollywood, California)
- Robert Vosgien – additional mastering and digital editing at CMS Digital (Pasadena, California)
- Richard Salvato – project coordinator
- Ralph Johnson – production assistant
- Hugh Syme – art direction, design, digital Illustrations
- Art Macnow – management

== Charts ==
Album

Year	Chart	Position
1996	Japanese Albums (Oricon)	25
1997	UK R&B Albums Chart	19
1997	US Billboard Top R&B Albums	50
1997	Dutch Album Top 100	78

Singles

Year	Single	Chart	Position
1996	"In The Name Of Love"	Japanese Pop Singles (Oricon)	9
1996	"Revolution"	US Billboard Hot R&B Singles	89
1997	"When Love Goes Wrong"	US Billboard Adult R&B Songs	33
2006	"Change Your Mind"	US Billboard Adult R&B Songs	26
