= Art Macnow =

American music business manager and executive (1936–2016)

- Born: Arthur Ira Macnow; July 21, 1936; Brooklyn, New York, U.S.
- Died: January 7, 2016 (aged 79)
- Occupations: Music business manager and executive
- Years active: 1970–2014
- Known for: Business management of Maurice White and Earth, Wind & Fire

Arthur Ira Macnow (July 21, 1936 – January 7, 2016), known professionally as Art Macnow, was an American music business manager and executive. A founding member of the business management firm Gelfand, Macnow, Rennert & Feldman, his clients included Neil Diamond, Bob Dylan and The Carpenters. He became Maurice White's business manager in 1973 and worked with White and Earth, Wind & Fire for more than four decades.

== Early life ==
Macnow was born Arthur Ira Macnow on July 21, 1936, in Brooklyn, New York. He married Rona Weiner in 1960, and they later moved to California.

== Career ==
Macnow was a founding member of the business management firm Gelfand, Macnow, Rennert & Feldman. In 1970, Macnow, then with Gelfand & Macnow, would handle the financial affairs of producer and composer David Axelrod's newly formed Heavy Axe Productions. In 1972, Macnow became Axelrod's business manager when Axelrod signed with Decca Records as an artist and producer.

Macnow became Maurice White's business manager in 1973. His other clients during his career included Neil Diamond, Bob Dylan and The Carpenters.

Macnow's association with Earth, Wind & Fire was also reflected in the group's album credits. Beginning with That's the Way of the World and Gratitude in 1975, he was credited with direction, often alongside Rich Salvato. He continued in that role on releases including All 'n All (1977) and I Am (1979). His later album credits included project supervision on Millennium (1993) and management on In the Name of Love (1997).

Macnow was also involved in White's record-label and other business activities. In 1996, White formed Kalimba Records, with Macnow, then co-manager of Earth, Wind & Fire, handling the label's business affairs.

Following Earth, Wind & Fire's departure from Warner Bros. Records, White and Macnow held discussions with record companies in Japan, resulting in an agreement with Avex for the Japanese release of In the Name of Love. Macnow later became a partner in Kalimba Entertainment, which handled White's activities outside Earth, Wind & Fire.

== Personal life ==
Macnow and his wife, Rona, had two children. Rona Macnow died in 2014. Art Macnow died on January 7, 2016, at the age of 79.
