= Urban Knights VI =

Studio album by Urban Knights
- Released: March 2005
- Recorded: 2004
- Studio: Chicago Recording Company, Chicago, Illinois
- Genre: Jazz
- Length: 53:55
- Label: GRP Records
- Producer: Ramsey Lewis (Exec), Frayne Lewis

Urban Knights chronology
Urban Knights V (2003)	Urban Knights VI (2005)	Urban Knights VII (2019)

Professional ratings
Review scores
Source	Rating
Allmusic	3.5/5 stars
Jazz Times	(favourable)

Urban Knights VI is the sixth album by the jazz group Urban Knights, released in 2005 by Narada Records. The album rose to No. 7 on the US Billboard Top Jazz Albums chart and No. 4 on the US Billboard Top Contemporary Jazz Albums chart.

== Overview ==
Urban Knights VI was executively produced by Ramsey Lewis. Stanley Clarke's "School Days", Lewis' "Close Your Eyes and Remember" along with Usher and Alicia Keys' "My Boo" were covered upon the album.

== Critical reception ==
Lucy Tauss of Jazz Times found, "Urban Knights have jettisoned the guest artist idea in favor of a stable lineup of Chicago-based players, with Lewis’ son Frayne at the helm. The ensemble brings its own fresh energy to the band’s R&B-infused sound on Urban Knights VI (Narada Jazz)."

Scott Yanow of Allmusic claimed "Although Urban Knights has never really had its own distinctive sound, it creates pleasing music that is danceable, funky, soulful and safe...The music overall has a light (some one would say lightweight) feel and should appeal to a large audience. Just do not expect originality, risks or any chances to be taken, for Urban Knights sticks closely to their chosen format/formula."

== Track listing ==
No.	Title	Length
1.	"School Days"	5:03
2.	"Close Your Eyes and Remember"	5:00
3.	"My Boo"	4:16
4.	"Come Back Jack"	4:36
5.	"My Love Is True"	4:58
6.	"Footprints"	5:33
7.	"Brazilica"	4:49
8.	"Fall Forward"	4:40
9.	"Memorias Belas"	4:24
10.	"Sly"	5:44
11.	"Onnikah"	4:52
