= Najee's Theme =

Studio album by Najee
- Released: 1986
- Studio: Celestial Sounds Studios, New York, NY; Unique Recording Studios, New York, NY; Bayside Sounds, Queens, NY
- Genre: Jazz
- Length: 44:01
- Label: EMI America
- Producer: Charles Elgart, Najee, Rahni Song

Najee chronology
Najee's Theme (1986)	Day by Day (1988)

Professional ratings
Review scores
Source	Rating
The Urban Music Scene	4.5/5 stars

Najee's Theme is the debut album by American jazz saxophonist and flautist, Najee. This album earned Najee a Grammy Award Nomination for Best R&B Instrumental Performance in 1988.

== Critical reception ==
Peggy Oliver of The Urban Music Scene writes, "It is hard to fathom that thirty years have passed since the single “Najee’s Theme” and the supporting album blazed the R&B and jazz charts, which for a debut recording was a remarkable accomplishment in itself." She gave the album 4½ out of five stars.

The New Pittsburgh Courier did a piece on Najee and remarked about the album, "Najee became a top name in instrumental and jazz music circles after releasing, “Najee’s Theme” in 1986."

== Charts ==
- Top Contemporary Jazz Albums No. 1
- Top Jazz Albums No. 8
- Top R&B/Hip-Hop Albums No. 12
- The Billboard 200 No. 56

== Track listing ==
No.	Title	Writer(s)	Length
1.	"Feel So Good to Me"	Rahni Song; Zack Vaz	4:42
2.	"Najee's Theme"	Rahni Song	4:36
3.	"For the Love of You"	Charlie Elgart; Jerome Najee Rasheed; Regis Ferguson	5:02
4.	"Can't Hide Love"	Skip Scarborough	5:10
5.	"We're Still Family"	Rahni Song	4:41
6.	"Sweet Love"	Anita Baker; Gary Bias; Louis Johnson	4:45
7.	"Betcha Don't Know"	Rahni Song	5:50
8.	"What You Do To Me"	Jerome Najee Rasheed; Onaje Allan Gumbs	5:13
9.	"Mysterious"	Wayne Brathwaite	4:02
Total length:			44:01

All track information and credits were taken from the CD liner notes.
