= My Point of View (Najee album) =

Album by Najee

Studio album by Najee
- Released: August 23, 2005
- Genre: Jazz
- Length: 45:41
- Label: Heads Up International

Najee chronology
Embrace (2003)	My Point of View (2005)	Rising Sun (2007)

Professional ratings
Review scores
Source	Rating
Allmusic	3.5/5 stars
All About Jazz	3.5/5 stars

My Point of View is a studio album by American jazz saxophonist and flautist, Najee. This album was released through Heads Up International in 2005. Jonathan Widran of AllMusic writes that "it's a good bet that this very likeable set will once again bring Najee to the forefront of the genre." Woodrow Wilkins of All About Jazz states in his review that "Najee delivers a pleasant collection of danceable and romantic grooves."

== Critical reception ==
Jonathan Widran of AllMusic writes, "Even with all the new sax players that have arisen on the scene since his albums were routinely selling gold, it's a good bet that this very likeable set will once again bring Najee to the forefront of the genre."

Woodrow Wilkins of All About Jazz says in his review, "Najee delivers a pleasant collection of danceable and romantic grooves." and concludes with "If you're not bothered by synthesized drums, you'll love this album. If, on the other hand, programming turns you off, you might want to skip it. My Point of View is nice, but it would have been much better if the artist had expressed himself free from the corporate forces that favor synths over instruments."

Smooth Jazz Therapy's review says, "My Point Of View is smooth jazz very much in the mid tempo laid back style that Najee has made his own. It’s a collection for grown ups that is controlled, never off the chain but always soulful sensuous and moving. The ten-track set exudes quality throughout and features a number of notable collaborations especially those in which Chris 'Mad Dog' Davies plays a part."

== Track listing ==
All tracks are written by Chris "Big Dog" Davis, unless otherwise noted.

No.	Title	Writer(s)	Length
1.	"Sidewayz"		5:33
2.	"3 AM" (Featuring Will Downing)		5:11
3.	"Fallin' in Love with You" (Introducing Lomon)	Chris Davis; Lomon Andrews	5:08
4.	"Back in the Day"	Najee Rasheed; Rex Rideout	4:37
5.	"Charm"	Najee Rasheed; Chris Davis	3:30
6.	"My Point of View"		4:39
7.	"2nd 2 None"	Najee Rasheed; James Lloyd	3:50
8.	"Emotional" (Introducing Sisaundra)	Najee Rasheed; Rohan Reid; Sisaundra Lewis; Fareed Rasheed	4:03
9.	"How Lovely You Are"		5:15
10.	"Miyuki"	Najee Rasheed; Mike Melvin; Superb Rasheed	3:55
Total length:			45:41

All track information and credits were taken from the CD liner notes.
