= A Nice Place to Be =

Studio album by George Howard
- Released: 1986
- Genre: Jazz
- Producer: George Howard; George Duke

George Howard chronology
Love Will Follow (1986)	A Nice Place to Be (1986)	Reflections (1988)

A Nice Place to Be is the fifth studio album by jazz saxophonist George Howard released in 1986 on MCA Records. On the Billboard charts, it spent two weeks on top of the Traditional Jazz Albums chart, while peaking at number two on the Contemporary Jazz Albums chart and number 22 on Top R&B Albums chart.

== Critical reception ==
Professional ratings
Review scores
Source	Rating
AllMusic	3/5 stars

With a 3 out of 5 star rating, Ron Wynn of AllMusic remarked "More jazz content than usual, but still far from what Howard is capable of doing."

== Track listing ==
1	No No	George Howard, Wayne Linsey	06:08
2	Jade's World	George Howard	05:15
3	Sweetest taboo	Sade Adu, Martin Ditcham	05:05
4	Nice Place to Be	George Howard, Wayne Linsey	05:18
5	Let's Live in Harmony	George Howard, Wayne Linsey	06:00
6	Pretty Face	Paul Gordon, Joseph Williams	05:02
7	Spenser: For Hire	Stephen Dorff, Larry Herbstritt	04:36
8	Stanley's Groove	Stanley Clarke, George Howard	05:45

== Charts ==
Chart (1987)	Peak position
US Billboard 200	109
US Top R&B/Hip-Hop Albums (Billboard)	22
US Top Contemporary Jazz Albums (Billboard)	2
US Traditional Jazz Albums (Billboard)	1
