= Attitude Adjustment (George Howard album) =

Studio album by George Howard
- Released: 1996
- Studio: Doppler Recording Studios, Atlanta; G Beata Gallery, Hollywood, CA; Opaz Studios, London, England; Le Gonks, Los Angeles, CA
- Genre: Jazz
- Length: 49:51
- Label: GRP Records
- Producer: George Duke; George Howard

George Howard chronology
A Home Far Away (1994)	Attitude Adjustment (1996)	Midnight Mood (1998)

Attitude Adjustment is the twelfth studio album by jazz saxophonist George Howard, released in 1996 on GRP Records. The album reached No. 3 on the Billboard Contemporary Jazz Albums chart, No. 5 on the Billboard Jazz Albums chart and No. 38 on the Billboard Top R&B Albums chart.

== Critical reception ==
Professional ratings
Review scores
Source	Rating
AllMusic	2.5/5 stars

Johnathan Widran of AllMusic gave the album a 2.5 out of 5 star rating. Yanow remarked "Just as we thought he was staying on cruise control, his 1996 release offers a major Attitude Adjustment (GRP) to sizzling effect. There's still a smattering of the soprano silk-o-rama on the ballads, but mostly his horn hits the street at breakneck speed. He may go overboard in incorporating vocal effects, but more important is the fact that the party (a celebratory street scene emphasizing the best of African American culture) never lets up."

== Tracklisting ==
No.	Title	Writer(s)	Length
1.	"Watch Your Back"	George Howard, Ray Hayden	4:54
2.	"Best Friend"	George Duke, George Howard	5:43
3.	"One Last Time"	George Duke	5:08
4.	"Dianne's Blues"	George Howard	5:11
5.	"4:49"	David Pack, Michael McDonald
6.	"Interlude"		0:06
7.	"Attitude Adjustment"	George Duke, George Howard	5:12
8.	"Let's Unwind"	Ray Hayden	5:01
9.	"I Apologize"	Anita Baker, Barry Eastmond, Gordon Chambers	4:40
10.	"A Whole Lotta Drum In Me"	Bill Summers, Speech	5:23
11.	"Adjusted Attitude"	George Duke, George Howard	3:50

== Credits ==
- Art Direction – Robin Lynch (2)
- Design [Graphic] – Alba Acevedo
- Engineer – Doug DeAngelis (tracks: 4, 9), Ray Hayden (tracks: 1, 8)
- Engineer [Additional] – Wayne Holmes (tracks: 2, 3, 7)
- Engineer [Assistant] – Jason Osborne (tracks: 1, 8)
- Mastered By – Bryan Gardner
- Mixed By – Bobby Brooks (tracks: 1, 10), Doug DeAngelis (tracks: 4, 5), Erik Zobler (tracks: 2, 3, 7, 9)
- Mixed By [Assistant] – Bobby Brooks (tracks: 4, 5), Brad Haehnel (tracks: 2, 3, 7, 9)
- Photography By – Lisa Peardon
- Recorded By – Colin Miller (tracks: 10), Erik Zobler (tracks: 2, 3, 7, 11), Ray Hayden (tracks: 1, 8)
- Recorded By [Additional] – Doug DeAngelis (tracks: 4, 5)
- Recorded By [Assistant] – Wayne Holmes (tracks: 2, 3, 7, 11)
- "Adjustment Crew" on track 7, 11: Private T, Buck G,
