= Sonny Emory =

American drummer (born 1962)

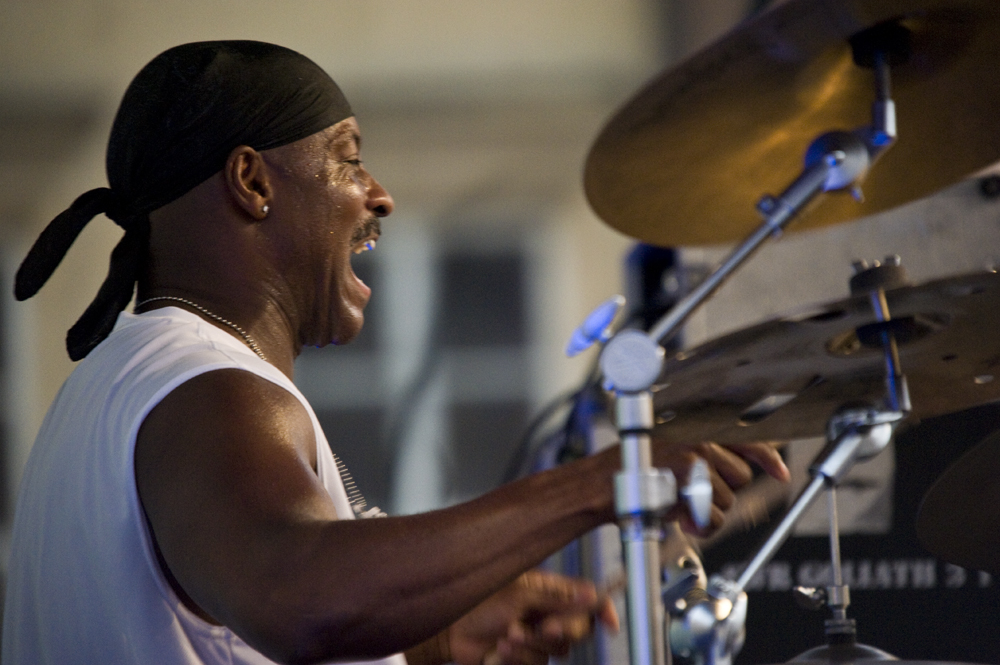
- Emory performing in 2012

Background information
- Born: December 23, 1962 (age 63); Atlanta, Georgia, U.S.
- Education: Georgia State University
- Genres: R&B; soul; jazz
- Occupation: Musician
- Instruments: Drums; percussion
- Years active: 1983–present
- Formerly of: Earth, Wind & Fire

Sonny Emory (born December 23, 1962) is an American drummer and percussionist. He is a former member of the band Earth, Wind & Fire. He has also worked with artists such as Bruce Hornsby, Steely Dan, Eric Clapton, Bette Midler and Lee Ritenour.

== Early years ==
Sonny Emory is a native of Atlanta, Georgia, who received his first drum set at the age of five. He attended Frederick Douglass High School. He graduated from Georgia State University with a bachelor's degree in Jazz and Classical Performance. After graduating, Emory began his career as a professional percussionist.

== Professional career ==
At first Emory played the drums on guitarist Bruce Hampton's 1987 album Arkansas and then upon keyboardist Joe Sample's 1987 LP Roles. Emory also went on to join the band Earth, Wind & Fire during 1987. He played on the band's 1990 album Heritage, 1993 album Millennium and 1997 album In the Name of Love.

As well he performed on saxophonist Brandon Fields 1988 album The Traveler. Emory then featured alongside Eric Clapton and David Sanborn on the soundtrack of the 1989 feature film Lethal Weapon 2. Emory later played the drums on The B-52's 1989 LP Cosmic Thing, Phyllis Hyman's 1991 album Prime of My Life, Peabo Bryson 1991 LP Can You Stop the Rain and Chic's 1992 album Chic-ism.

Emory also featured on George Howard's 1993 LP When Summer Comes, Bobby Lyle's 1994 album Rhythm Stories, Everette Harp's 1994 LP Common Ground and the Urban Knights 1997 album Urban Knights II. He also played percussion upon Lee Ritenour's 1997 album Alive in L.A., 1998 studio LP This Is Love and Steely Dan's 2000 album Two Against Nature. Thereafter he performed on Miki Howard's 2001 Grammy-nominated album Three Wishes, Alex Bugnon's 2003 album Southern Living, his 2005 album Free, Brian Culbertson's 2008 album Bringing Back the Funk and Lee Ritenour's 2012 album Rhythm Sessions.

Emory was a member of Bruce Hornsby's Noisemakers band from 2002 to 2018.

== Teaching career ==
Emory lectures as an adjunct professor in Applied Percussion at Georgia State University.
