= In the Name of Love (Earth, Wind & Fire song) =

Single by Earth, Wind & Fire

from the album In The Name of Love
- Released: 1996
- Genre: Pop, R&B
- Label: Avex Trax
- Songwriters: Melanie Andrews; Morris Pleasure; Sheldon Reynolds *Betty Reynolds; Maurice White
- Producer: Maurice White

Earth, Wind & Fire singles chronology
"Blood Brothers" (1994)	"In the Name of Love" (1996)	"Revolution" (1997)

"In the Name of Love" is a single by R&B/funk band Earth, Wind & Fire issued in 1996 by Avex Trax. The song reached No. 9 on the Japanese Oricon Singles Chart.

== Overview ==
In the Name of Love was produced by Maurice White who composed the song alongside Melanie Andrews, Morris Pleasure, Sheldon Reynolds and Betty Reynolds. This single's b-side was another song entitled Cruising. Both of these tunes came upon Earth, Wind & Fire's 1997 album In The Name of Love.

== Critical reception ==
Phyl Garland of Stereo Review wrote "The signature shouting horns provide an exciting response to the strutting vocals of the catchy title song." Geoffrey Himes of the Washington Post found "Maurice White's lead vocals engage the horns in a heady call-and-response dialogue." David Wild of Rolling Stone also called the tune "classic sounding."
