= When Summer Comes =

Studio album by George Howard
- Released: 1993
- Genre: Jazz
- Length: 47:00
- Label: GRP Records
- Producer: Keith Lewis; George Howard

George Howard chronology
Do I Ever Cross Your Mind? (1992)	When Summer Comes (1993)	A Home Far Away (1994)

When Summer Comes is a studio album by jazz saxophonist George Howard, released in 1993 on GRP Records. The album reached No. 4 on the Billboard Contemporary Jazz Albums chart and No. 32 on the Billboard Top R&B Albums chart.

When Summer Comes was executively produced by Larry Rosen and Dave Grusin. Artists such as George Duke, Everette Harp, Sonny Emory, Paul Jackson Jr. and Stanley Clarke appeared on the album.

== Critical reception ==
Professional ratings
Review scores
Source	Rating
AllMusic	2/5 stars

AllMusic gave the album a 2 out of 5 star rating.

== Tracklisting ==
No.	Title	Writer(s)	Length
1.	"When Summer Comes"	George Howard, Vance Taylor	04:36
2.	"Grazing in the Grass"	Harry Elston, Philemon Hou, Hugh Masekela	04:45
3.	"Just for Tonight"	Ronnie Garrett, George Howard, Rex Rideout	04:51
4.	"Hard Times"	George Howard, Vance Taylor	05:07
5.	"Three Minute Warning"	Sonny Emory, Ronnie Garrett, George Howard, Vance Taylor	04:11
6.	"Family"	Sekou Bunch, Ray Griffin	05:01
7.	"Only Human"	Barry Eastman, Jeffrey Osborne	04:53
8.	"When a Child Smiles"	George Howard, Vance Taylor	03:51
9.	"Reach"	Ronnie Garrett, George Howard	05:03
10.	"Out in the Cold"	Ronnie Garrett, Vance Taylor	04:32

== Credits ==
- Coordinator [Production Coordination] – Marc Engel
- Engineer – Devon Black (2) (tracks: 2)
- Engineer [Assistant At Devonshire] – Jeff Graham, Rick Novak
- Engineer [Assistant At Sand Castle] – Alex Sok, Tim Nitz
- Engineer [Assistant At The Chapel Studio] – Andy Warwick
- Engineer [Assistant At Tree Sound] – J. Paul Diaz
- Engineer [Tracking & Overdubs] – Bobby Brooks
- Engineer [Tracking At Tree Sound, Atlanta] – Malcolm Weldon
- Executive-Producer – Dave Grusin, Larry Rosen
- Mastered By – Steve Hall
- Mixed By – Bobby Brooks, George Howard
- Post Production [Post-Production By] – Adam Zelinka, Joseph Doughney, Michael Landy
- Producer – George Howard (tracks: 1, 3–5, 7–10), Keith Lewis (tracks: 2), Rayford Griffin (tracks: 6)
- Producer [Assistant] – Sam Sims (tracks: 7, 8), Vance Taylor
- Programmed By [Keyboard Programming], Sound Designer – Michael McKnight
- Soprano Saxophone – George Howard
