= Henry Johnson (guitarist) =

American jazz guitarist (born 1954)

- Born: January 28, 1954 (age 71); Chicago, Illinois, U.S.
- Genres: Jazz
- Occupation: Musician
- Instrument: Guitar
- Labels: MCA
- Website: www.henryjohnsonjazz.com

Henry Johnson (born January 28, 1954) is an American jazz guitarist from Chicago.

== Career ==
Johnson was born in Chicago on January 28, 1954, and grew up in Memphis. He started playing the guitar at the age of 12, teaching himself. He played various styles of music until hearing Wes Montgomery ignited an interest in jazz. He entered Indiana University in 1973.

Johnson has worked with Hank Crawford, Freddie Hubbard, Ramsey Lewis, Norman Simmons, Jimmy Smith, Sonny Stitt, Stanley Turrentine, Joe Williams, and Nancy Wilson. He has led his own bands since 1982.

== Discography ==
=== As leader ===
- You're the One (MCA Impulse!, 1986)
- Future Excursions (MCA Impulse!, 1988)
- Never Too Much (MCA, 1990)
- New Beginnings (Heads Up, 1993)
- Missing You (Heads Up, 1994)
- An Evening at Sea (Chairoscuro, 2000)
- Organic (A440 Music, 2003)

=== As sideman ===
With Ramsey Lewis

- Three Piece Suite (Columbia, 1981)
- Live at the Savoy (Columbia, 1982)
- Ivory Pyramid (GRP, 1992)
- Dance of the Soul (GRP, 1998)
- Simple Pleasures (Narada, 2003)
- Taking Another Look (Ramsey's House, 2011)

With Norman Simmons

- The Heat and the Sweet (Milljac, 1997)
- The Art of Norman Simmons (Savant, 2000)
- Synthesis (Savant, 2002)

With Joe Williams

- Every Night: Live at Vine St. (Verve, 1987)
- In Good Company (Verve, 1989)
- Ballad and Blues Master [live] (Verve, 1992)

With others

- Richie Cole, Profile (Heads Up, 1993)
- Red Holloway, Go Red Go! (Delmark, 2009)
- Vanessa Rubin, Language of Love (Telarc, 1999)
- Urban Knights, Urban Knights (GRP, 1995)
- The Whispers, More of the Night (Capitol, 1990)
