= Urban Knights IV =

Studio album by Urban Knights
- Released: 2001
- Genre: Jazz
- Label: Narada
- Producer: Ramsey Lewis (Exec.), Frayne Lewis, Kevin Randolph

Urban Knights chronology
Urban Knights III (2000)	Urban Knights IV (2001)	Urban Knights Presents the Chicago Project (2002)

Urban Knights IV is the fourth studio album by the jazz group Urban Knights released in 2001 on Narada Records. In the US, the album reached No. 2 on the Billboard Top Jazz Albums chart and No. 1 on the Billboard Top Contemporary Jazz Albums chart.

== Overview ==
Urban Knights IV was produced by Frayne Lewis with rhythm guitarist Norman Brown and saxophonist Steve Cole appearing as guest artists.

== Critical reception ==
Professional ratings
Review scores
Source	Rating
AllMusic	4/5 stars

Matt Collar of AllMusic favourably wrote "Due largely to the inclusion of trumpeter Ron Haynes — a one-time Donald Byrd protégé — the fourth entry by Ramsey Lewis' smooth jazz supergroup is reminiscent of Byrd's seminal 1970s recordings. While merely hinting at Byrd's proto-disco inventions, Urban Knights IV is nonetheless a modern update of the trumpeter's work with the Blackbyrds. Although this album is nowhere near as funky as, say, Electric Byrd, it does come off grittier than many albums by Urban Knights' contemporaries."

== Tracklisting ==
No.	Title	Writer(s)	Length
1.	"The Message feat: Ron Haynes"	Frayne Lewis, Kevin Randolph, Sharay Reed	05:03
2.	"Moving Pictures"	Frayne Lewis, Ramsey Lewis, Kevin Randolph	04:03
3.	"Slick feat. Norman Brown"	Frayne Lewis, Kevin Randolph	04:53
4.	"Alright feat. Opal"	Frayne Lewis, Kevin Randolph, Bryan Sledge	04:40
5.	"Latin Flavor feat. Ron Haynes"	Frayne Lewis, Kevin Randolph, Lambert Waldrip	05:05
6.	"Pretty"	Frayne Lewis, Ramsey Lewis, Kevin Randolph	05:18
7.	"Sign Your Name feat. Steve Cole"	Terence Trent D'Arby	04:16
8.	"Thinking About Your Love"	Kevin Randolph, Bryan Sledge	04:36
9.	"The One"	Kevin Randolph, Lambert Waldrip	03:55
10.	"Hi-Heel Sneakers"		04:25
11.	"Clubland"	Ron Haynes, Vince Lawrence, Frayne Lewis, Ramsey Lewis, Kevin Randolph	05:03
12.	"Thinking About Your Love"	Kevin Randolph, Bryan Sledge	04:26
