= Urban Knights I =

Studio album by Urban Knights
- Released: 1995
- Recorded: May 13–22, 1994
- Studio: River North Studios
- Genre: Jazz
- Length: 49:50
- Label: GRP
- Producer: Maurice White, Carl Griffin

Urban Knights chronology
Urban Knights I (1995)	Urban Knights II (1997)

Urban Knights I is the debut album by the jazz group Urban Knights released in 1995 by GRP Records. The album reached No. 5 on the US Billboard Top Jazz Albums chart and No. 9 upon the UK Jazz Albums chart.

== Overview ==
Urban Knights 1 was produced by Maurice White. Artists such as The Emotions, Freddie Hubbard, Grover Washington Jr. and Omar Hakim appear on the album. Urban Knights I also features a cover of Earth, Wind & Fire's 1981 single "Wanna Be with You".

== Critical reception ==
Professional ratings
Review scores
Source	Rating
Jazz Times	(favourable)
AllMusic	2/5 stars
Philadelphia Inquirer	2.5/4 stars
Vox	(9/10)
Charlotte Observer	3.5/4 stars
Milwaukee Journal Sentinel	(favourable)

Langston Wentz Jr. of the Charlotte Observer wrote, "Ramsey Lewis, Grover Washington Jr., Omar Hakim and Victor Bailey all got together to make a pop-jazz album. What do you think the results would be? Each is a super talent with a super history in his own right. Together they combine the best of each other's talents. This is a sizzling piece of work. Smooth at times, mellow and electric."

Ronald Kovach of the Milwaukee Journal-Sentinel claimed "a few things boost this recording a big notch higher, most notably the presence of drummer Omar Hakim and bassist Victor Bailey the rhythm section during Weather Report's final three years. They are an exceptional unit, and give generous portions of this album a real kick...The music also benefits from better-than-average arrangements (note Lewis' lovely piano intro for the effervescent "Friendship"), impressive variety and a perfect recording."

== Track listing ==
No.	Title	Writer(s)	Length
1.	"On the Radio"	Maurice White, Bill Meyers	4:40
2.	"Wanna Be with You"	Wayne Vaughn, Maurice White	4:41
3.	"Chill"	Maurice White, Bill Meyers	6:08
4.	"Hearts of Longing"	Omar Hakim	7:15
5.	"Friendship"	Maurice White, Bill Meyers	4:12
6.	"Miracle"	Ramsey Lewis, Frayne Lewis, Bobby Lewis, Omar Hakim	5:09
7.	"The Rose"	Maurice White, Robyn Smith	6:34
8.	"Urban Samba"	Ramsey Lewis	4:42
9.	"Forever More"	Mike Logan	5:59
10.	"Senegal"	Maurice White, Bill Meyers	6:49

== Personnel ==
- Victor Bailey - Electric bass
- Paulinho Da Costa - Percussion
- The Emotions - Vocals
- Omar Hakim - Drums, vocals
- Jeanette Hawes - Vocals
- Freddie Hubbard - Trumpet
- Sheila Hutchinson - Vocals
- Paul Jackson Jr. - Guitar
- Ramsey Lewis - Piano
- Michael Logan - Synthesizer, vocals
- Bill Meyers - Synthesizer
- Jimi Randolph - Producer
- Wanda Vaughn - Vocals
- Grover Washington Jr. - Soprano and tenor saxophone

== Charts ==
Chart performance for Urban Knights I
Chart (1995)	Peak position
US Billboard Top Contemporary Jazz Albums	3
US Billboard Top Jazz Albums	5
US Billboard Heatseekers	17
UK Top Jazz Albums	5
