= Dancing in the Sun (album) =

Studio album by George Howard
- Released: 1985
- Genre: Jazz
- Label: TBA Records, GRP Records
- Producer: George Howard

George Howard chronology
Steppin' Out (1984)	Dancing in the Sun (1985)	Love Will Follow (1986)

Dancing in the Sun is the third studio album released by jazz saxophonist George Howard in 1985 on TBA/GRP Records. The album spent three weeks at number one on the Billboard Traditional Jazz Albums chart.

== Covers ==
Howard covered Lionel Richie's "Love Will Find a Way", and Diana Ross' "Telephone" for the album.

== Track listing ==
No.	Title	Writer(s)	Length
1.	"Love Will Find a Way"	Greg Phillinganes, Lionel Richie	5:59
2.	"Dancing in the Sun"	B. Johnson, George Howard	6:18
3.	"Quiet as It's Kept"	George Howard	5:30
4.	"In Love"	B. Edwards, D. Miller	4:39
5.	"Telephone"	D. Miller, K. Williams	4:03
6.	"Stay with Me"	George Howard	4:38
7.	"Moods"	George Howard	4:47
