= Love and Understanding (George Howard album) =

Studio album by George Howard
- Released: February 19, 1991
- Studio: Buxer Sound Studios, Los Angeles, CA
- Genre: Jazz
- Length: 48:52
- Label: GRP Records
- Producer: George Duke; Carl Griffin; Dave Grusin; George Howard; Victor Bailey

George Howard chronology
Personal (1990)	Love and Understanding (1991)	Do I Ever Cross Your Mind? (1992)

Love and Understanding is the eighth studio album by jazz saxophonist George Howard, released in 1991 on GRP Records. The album reached No. 1 on the Billboard Contemporary Jazz Albums chart and No. 32 on the Billboard Top R&B Albums chart.

Personal was executively produced by Carl Griffin along with Dave Grusin. Artists such as Lenny Castro and George Duke appear on the album.

== Critical reception ==
Professional ratings
Review scores
Source	Rating
AllMusic	3/5 stars

Johnathan Widran of AllMusic, in a 3 out of 5 star review, said "After eight albums, the late soprano saxophonist George Howard found a comfortable and solid if slightly predictable niche in the intensifying realm of instrumental R&B. On Love & Understanding, his first original GRP outing (after a re-release of 1985's Dancing in the Sun), he sticks to the basic funk and romance formulas which made him one of the most consistent suppliers of sweet and nasty improvisational soul over the previous half decade."

== Track listing ==
Track no.	Song title	Songwriter(s)	Length
1	Hopscotch	Victor Bailey, Charles Bell, George Howard	05:22
2	Only Here for a Minute	Dean Gant, George Howard	05:21
3	Baby, Come to Me	Narada Michael Walden, Jeffrey Cohen	06:34
4	Interlude	George Howard	00:50
5	Love and Understanding	George Duke, George Howard	05:20
6	Everything I Miss at Home	Jimmy Jam and Terry Lewis	05:11
7	Lovestruck	Jimmy Grimsby, George Howard	05:17
8	Talk to the Drum	George Howard	04:36
9	Red, Black 'N' Blue	Victor Bailey, George Howard	05:11
10	Broad Street	Victor Bailey, George Howard	05:10
