= Change Your Mind (Earth, Wind & Fire song) =

Single by Earth, Wind & Fire

from the album In The Name of Love
- Released: 2006
- Genre: Pop, R&B
- Label: Kalimba Music
- Songwriters: Bill Myers; Brenda Russell; Maurice White
- Producer: Maurice White

Earth, Wind & Fire singles chronology
"To You" (2005)	"Change Your Mind" (2006)	"Guiding Lights" (2012)

"Change Your Mind" is a single by R&B/funk band Earth, Wind & Fire issued in 2006 by Kalimba Music. The song reached No. 26 on the Billboard Adult R&B Songs chart.

== Overview ==
"Change Your Mind" was produced by Maurice White and written by White, Bill Meyers and Brenda Russell. The song was included on EWF's studio album In the Name of Love.
