= Urban Knights V =

Studio album by Urban Knights
- Released: 2003
- Studio: Chicago Recording Company, Chicago, Illinois; The Rhythm Cafe, Chicago, Illinois
- Genre: Jazz
- Length: 55:05
- Label: Narada
- Producer: Ramsey Lewis

Urban Knights chronology
| The Chicago Project (2002) | Urban Knights V (2003) | Urban Knights VI (2005) |

Professional ratings
Review scores
| Source | Rating |
|---|---|
| AllMusic | 3/5 stars |
| Jazz Times | (favourable) |
| Pittsburgh Post-Gazette | 3/4 stars |

Urban Knights V is the sixth album by the jazz group Urban Knights released in 2003 on Narada Records. The album reached No. 15 on the US Billboard Top Jazz Albums chart and No. 7 on the US Billboard Top Contemporary Jazz Albums chart.

== Overview ==
Urban Knights V was executively produced by Ramsey Lewis. Artists such as Kenny Garrett and Michelle Williams appeared on the album.

The Urban Knights covered Marvin Gaye's "Got to Give It Up", Johnny Nash's "I Can See Clearly Now" and Chicago's "Will You Still Love Me?" on the album.

== Critical reception ==
Lucy Tauss of JazzTimes remarked "Urban Knights V...showcases burgeoning Chicago talent as well as well-established members of the jazz community."

Adam Greenburg of AllMusic lauded the album saying, "As far as smooth jazz goes, this is an outstanding collection from the all-stars of the genre, complete with some thoroughly worked-out funkiness at the hands of Lewis as the need arises....Both newcomers to the genre or old Ramsey Lewis fans should give it a listen."

Rick Nowlin of the Pittsburgh Post-Gazette took note that, "This band, so to speak -- I put it that way because of the rotating personnel -- is a long-running side project for Chicago- based producer Frayne Lewis, who brought this talent together. Of course, having his father, pianist Ramsey, in the fold makes for good listening."

== Track listing ==
| No. | Title | Length |
|---|---|---|
| 1. | "Got to Give It Up" (featuring Ramsey Lewis) | 3:53 |
| 2. | "Quiet Heart" (featuring Kenny Garrett) | 5:04 |
| 3. | "Church" (featuring Ramsey Lewis) | 4:29 |
| 4. | "Will You Still Love Me?" (featuring Michelle Williams) | 4:43 |
| 5. | "On the Up" (featuring Kenny Garrett) | 6:26 |
| 6. | "King" (featuring Henry Johnson) | 4:30 |
| 7. | "I Can See Clearly Now" (featuring Steve Zoloto) | 5:00 |
| 8. | "No One" (featuring Paul Walton) | 4:48 |
| 9. | "The New Funktier" (featuring Orbert Davis) | 5:49 |
| 10. | "Dream" (featuring Steve Zoloto) | 4:53 |
| 11. | "Honor Him/Now We Are Free" (featuring Ramsey Lewis) | 5:30 |
