= Morris Pleasure =

American singer and producer (born 1962)

- Also known as: Mo Pleasure
- Born: Morris Joseph Pleasure; July 12, 1962 (age 64); Hartford, Connecticut, United States
- Genres: Brazilian; Classical; Funk; Jazz; Jazz fusion; R&B; Soul
- Occupations: Composer; arranger; producer; musical director; recording artist
- Instruments: Piano; keyboards; trumpet; bass guitar; guitar
- Years active: 1986–present
- Label: Watersign Media
- Formerly of: Earth, Wind & Fire
- Website: mopleasure.com

Morris "Mo" Joseph Pleasure (born July 12, 1962) is an American composer, singer, producer and multi-instrumentalist. Pleasure is a former member of Earth, Wind & Fire and the Average White Band and a musical director for singer Bette Midler. Pleasure has also worked with artists such as Ray Charles, Najee, George Duke, Marion Meadows and Natalie Cole. Along with the likes of Roberta Flack, Michael Jackson, Janet Jackson, Brian Culbertson, and David Foster.

== History ==
Pleasure was born in Hartford, Connecticut. His parents Robert and Evelyn Pleasure were originally from Louisiana, but moved to Hartford so Robert could attend Yale Divinity School from which he graduated in 1961. The family then moved to Guilford, Connecticut when young Pleasure was 7 years old. Pleasure began playing piano at age four and studied piano under Carol Wright from age seven to 17.

Frequent trips to Louisiana to visit family exposed him to Gospel music as many of his relatives were active in church. And it was on these trips that he also experienced firsthand the inequalities of the still-segregated south. A black family traveling through the South in those times could not stop at a hotel for the night.

By the time Pleasure was a teenager, he had become proficient in trumpet, guitar, drums and violin as well. He composed his first song at age 12. He accompanied his father (an accomplished tenor) at all the Guilford high school's graduations from 1975–80 and was active in his high school's music programs. Pleasure holds a Bachelor of Arts degree in music from the University of Connecticut.

Some of his main influences for playing piano/keyboards include George Duke, Joe Sample, Ramsey Lewis, Herbie Hancock, Donald Blackman, and Chick Corea. Also, Verdine White, Chuck Rainey, James Jamerson, Jaco Pastorius, Bootsy Collins, and Chuck Rainey had a strong impact on Pleasure's love for the bass guitar and his approach to playing it.

== Career ==
Pleasure started his career in 1986 as a new member of Ray Charles' orchestra. He went on to play the keyboards/bass on Najee's 1990 album Tokyo Blue, Everette Harp's 1992 self-titled LP, Marion Meadows' 1992 album Keep It Right There and Stanley Clarke's 1993 LP Live at the Greek. During 1994 Pleasure joined Earth, Wind & Fire as the band's new musical director. Pleasure went on to play keyboards on EW&F's 1996 album Greatest Hits Live, 1997 album In the Name of Love and 2004 DVD at Montreux 1997.

He also featured on Najee's 1994 album Share My World and Marion Meadows' 1994 LP Forbidden Fruit. Pleasure then appeared on jazz group Urban Knights's 1997 album Urban Knights II and Gerald Albright's 1997 LP Live to Love. As well he produced George Howard on his 1998 album Midnight Mood and Philip Bailey on his 1999 album Dreams.

After eight years with EWF, Pleasure played on Janet Jackson's All For You tour and her 2002 feature film Janet: Live in Hawaii. He then guested on Boney James' 2004 album Pure and the 2004 Jimi Hendrix tribute album Power of Soul: A Tribute to Jimi Hendrix.

Pleasure later played bass guitar on Brian Culbertson 2007 album Bringing Back The Funk and performed on Michael Jackson's 2009 feature film This Is It. He then worked with Christina Aguilera and later became the musical director of Bette Midler. Pleasure also played keyboards on Roberta Flack 2012 album Let It Be Roberta.

He has also gone on tour with artists such as George Duke, Mary J. Blige, Chaka Khan, Natalie Cole, Frankie Beverly & Maze, Peter Cetera and David Foster.

== Personal life ==
He has devoted time to philanthropic efforts including fundraising for the Guilford ABC Program and Guilford High School music programs and co-founded "We R 1 Voice" with his ex-wife Lori in 2013. He currently lives in Aberystwyth, Wales, with his fellow musician/singer partner and wife Kedma Macias and their two daughters.

== Discography ==
- Elements of Pleasure (2004) Watersign Records
