= Urban Knights =

- Genres: Jazz; jazz fusion
- Years active: 1995–2005, 2019–present
- Labels: GRP, Narada

The Urban Knights are an American all-star jazz fusion band. They released their self-titled debut in 1995. They have a total of eight studio albums.

== Overview ==
The Urban Knights' debut album, Urban Knights I, was released in 1995 by GRP Records. Produced by Maurice White, the album features musicians such as Grover Washington, Jr., Ramsey Lewis, Omar Hakim, Victor Bailey, Freddie Hubbard and The Emotions. The album reached No. 5 on the US Billboard Top Jazz Albums chart and No. 9 on the UK Top Jazz Albums chart.

The jazz group's followup album, Urban Knights II, was released in 1997 by GRP. Once again produced by Maurice White, the album features saxophonists Gerald Albright and Najee as well as guitarists Jonathan Butler, Verdine White and Morris Pleasure.

Jazz Times said, "With moods playful to passionate and players in a relaxed goodtime frame of mind, it's a perfect party disc."

Don Heckman of the Los Angeles Times wrote, "The music that results can perhaps best be described as rhythm & jazz--bits and pieces of improvising from Lewis and the horn players juxtaposed against insistent, funk-driven rhythms. South African Butler, especially on the tracks in which he sings ("South African Jam" and "Brazilian Rain," especially), brings a seductive world-music ambience to the proceedings." The album reached No. 7 on the US Billboard Top Jazz Albums chart and No. 24 on the UK Top Jazz Albums chart.

During 2000, the group's third studio album, Urban Knights III, was issued on Narada Records. Dave Koz, Earl Klugh, and Fareed Haque played on the LP. People said, "sixties jazz-pop pioneer Ramsey Lewis ("The 'In' Crowd") contributes keyboards on 10 of these 12 tracks by the latest group of hot, young Chicago musicians he has assembled for this urbane joust." Hilarie Grey of Jazz Times said, "Ramsey Lewis' Urban Knights III exploits the urban sophistication and stylish blue roots of its Chicago setting".

== Discography ==
=== Albums ===
Year	Title	Peak chart positions			Record label
Year	Title	US Jazz	US Con. Jazz	UK Jazz	Record label
1995	Urban Knights I	5	3	9	GRP
1997	Urban Knights II	7	5	24	GRP
2000	Urban Knights III	4	3	-	Narada
2001	Urban Knights IV	2	1	-	Narada
2002	Urban Knights Presents the Chicago Project	30	21	-	Narada
2003	Urban Knights V	15	7	-	Narada
2005	Urban Knights VI	6	4	-	Narada
2019	Urban Knights VII	-	-	-	Rodeadope
