= George Howard (jazz) =

American smooth jazz saxophonist

- George Howard, 1992

Background information
- Born: George Nathaniel Howard Jr. September 15, 1956; Philadelphia, Pennsylvania, U.S.
- Died: March 20, 1998 (aged 41) Atlanta, Georgia, U.S.
- Genres: Smooth jazz
- Occupation: Musician
- Instrument: Saxophone
- Years active: 197?–1998
- Labels: Palo Alto, MCA, GRP

George Nathaniel Howard Jr. (September 15, 1956 – March 20, 1998) was an American smooth jazz saxophonist. He released a total of fifteen albums under Palo Alto Records, MCA Records and GRP Records.

== Early life ==
Howard was born in Philadelphia, Pennsylvania, and was only six years old when he began taking music lessons at school on clarinet and bassoon. Influenced by John Coltrane and Wayne Shorter, he later on chose the soprano saxophone, because it resembled the bassoon. By the time he was 15, Howard began touring the country with notable rhythm-and-blues groups such as Blue Magic, First Choice and Harold Melvin and the Blue Notes. In the late 1970s, he toured with saxophonist Grover Washington, Jr., who was one of his idols.

== Music career ==
In the early 1980s, Howard started his solo career, and released his first and second studio albums, Asphalt Gardens in 1982, and Steppin' Out in 1984; both albums were well received and ranked high on the Billboard magazine jazz album charts at No. 25 and 9, respectively. The last track on Steppin' Out titled "Dream Ride" features Howard playing soprano saxophone; the track was promoted in 1984 in the United Kingdom by DJ Robbie Vincent, and is now a classic among soul and jazz enthusiasts.

By 1985, Howard's third album Dancing in the Sun had scaled the Billboard Jazz Album chart to No. 1.; his next album, Love Will Follow (1986), topped the Billboard Jazz Albums chart. After the release of that album, he left Palo Alto Records to join MCA Records, only for his subsequent albums, A Nice Place to Be (1986), and Reflections (1988), to also top the said chart. His next album, Personal (1990), featured his biggest hit single "Shower You With Love".

Howard then signed with GRP Records and released Love and Understanding in 1991; this album was followed by Do I Ever Cross Your Mind? (1992), and When Summer Comes (1993). He later released A Home Far Away (1994), which features the song "Grover's Groove", a tribute to Washington Jr., and Attitude Adjustment (1996). Howard's first five years with GRP, plus a selection of his MCA recordings, were summarized on The Very Best of George Howard and Then Some, which was released in 1997.

During the 1996 Summer Olympics in Atlanta, Georgia, Howard performed at a hospitality house for the continent of Africa, which influenced his music after a visit there. His music was also featured in the "Local on the 8s" forecast segments on The Weather Channel. Howard returned to recording with his next album Midnight Mood, which was released in January 1998, and was his final album released under GRP.

== Death ==
Howard died from colon cancer at Piedmont Hospital in Atlanta on March 20, 1998, at the age of 41. His final album, There's a Riot Goin' On, was released posthumously under the Blue Note Records label two months after his death. Howard was survived by his daughter, Jade Howard, and two sisters, Mary Howard and Doris Beverly.

== Discography ==
- 1982: Asphalt Gardens (Palo Alto)
- 1984: Steppin' Out (Palo Alto)
- 1985: Dancing in the Sun (Palo Alto)
- 1986: Love Will Follow (Palo Alto)
- 1986: A Nice Place to Be (MCA)
- 1988: Reflections (MCA)
- 1990: Personal (MCA)
- 1991: Love and Understanding (GRP)
- 1992: Do I Ever Cross Your Mind? (GRP)
- 1993: When Summer Comes (GRP)
- 1994: A Home Far Away (GRP)
- 1996: Attitude Adjustment (GRP)
- 1997: The Very Best of George Howard and Then Some (GRP)
- 1998: Midnight Mood (GRP)
- 1998: There's a Riot Goin' On (Blue Note)
