= Najee =

American jazz saxophonist and flutist

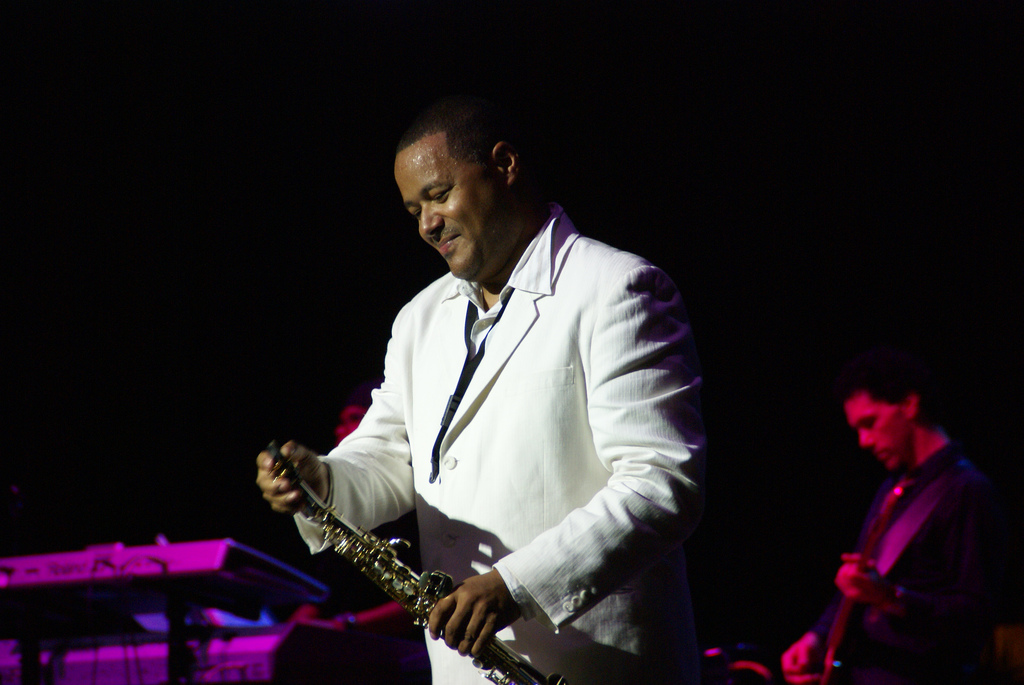
- Photo by William Henderson

Background information
- Born: Jerome Najee Rasheed; November 4, 1957 (age 68); New York City, New York, U.S.
- Genres: Jazz, smooth jazz, R&B
- Occupation: Saxophonist
- Instruments: Saxophone, flute
- Years active: 1986–present
- Labels: EMI; Capitol; Blue Note; Verve Forecast; Heads Up; Telarc; E1; Concord; Shanachie
- Website: Official site

Jerome Najee Rasheed (born November 4, 1957), known professionally as Najee (/ˈnɑːdʒiː/ NAH-jee), is an American jazz saxophonist and flautist. Najee has been married to Karen Green since 2000.

== Early life ==
Najee was born in the lower west side of Manhattan in New York City and lived his teenage years in Queens, New York. His father died at a young age, and Najee and siblings were raised by his mother Mary Richards. His mother was an important figure and supporter throughout his life and musical career.

Najee's musical pursuits began in grade school at age eight, where he began playing the clarinet, but he had a deep desire to play saxophone. He was influenced at this age by listening to his mother's recordings of Miles Davis and other American jazz artists. A pivotal moment in his life came when he made the decision to become a professional jazz musician. In high school, Najee began to study jazz as a student at the Jazzmobile program (co-founded by Dr. Billy Taylor) where he honed his skills on tenor saxophone and flute under the direction of Jimmy Heath, Frank Foster and Ernie Wilkins. At age 16, Najee studied flute at the Manhattan School of Music Preparatory Division, where he took lessons with Harold Jones, flautist from the New York Philharmonic Orchestra.

Najee draws his inspiration from saxophonists John Coltrane, Charlie Parker, Yusef Lateef, Joe Henderson, Grover Washington Jr., Ronnie Laws as well as flautists Hubert Laws and James Galway. Najee began his career as a teenager performing in local bands in the New York City area. After high school, Najee's first world tour was with a band from New York City called "Area Code".

The band spent two years performing on military bases in Europe, Iceland, Greenland, Central America, Caribbean, and the United States on behalf of the USO. Upon his return from the USO World Tour, Najee went on the road in the summer of 1978 with Ben E. King. After touring with Ben E. King, Najee and his brother Fareed attended New York City's Bronx Community College for two semesters. Both were music majors under the tutelage of Valerie Capers. The following year both brothers auditioned and were admitted to the New England Conservatory of Music in Boston. Najee was a performance and composition major. He also studied with Joe Allard (1st clarinetist for Toscanini). At the Conservatory Najee studied and performed with George Russell and Jaki Byard big bands.

== Career ==
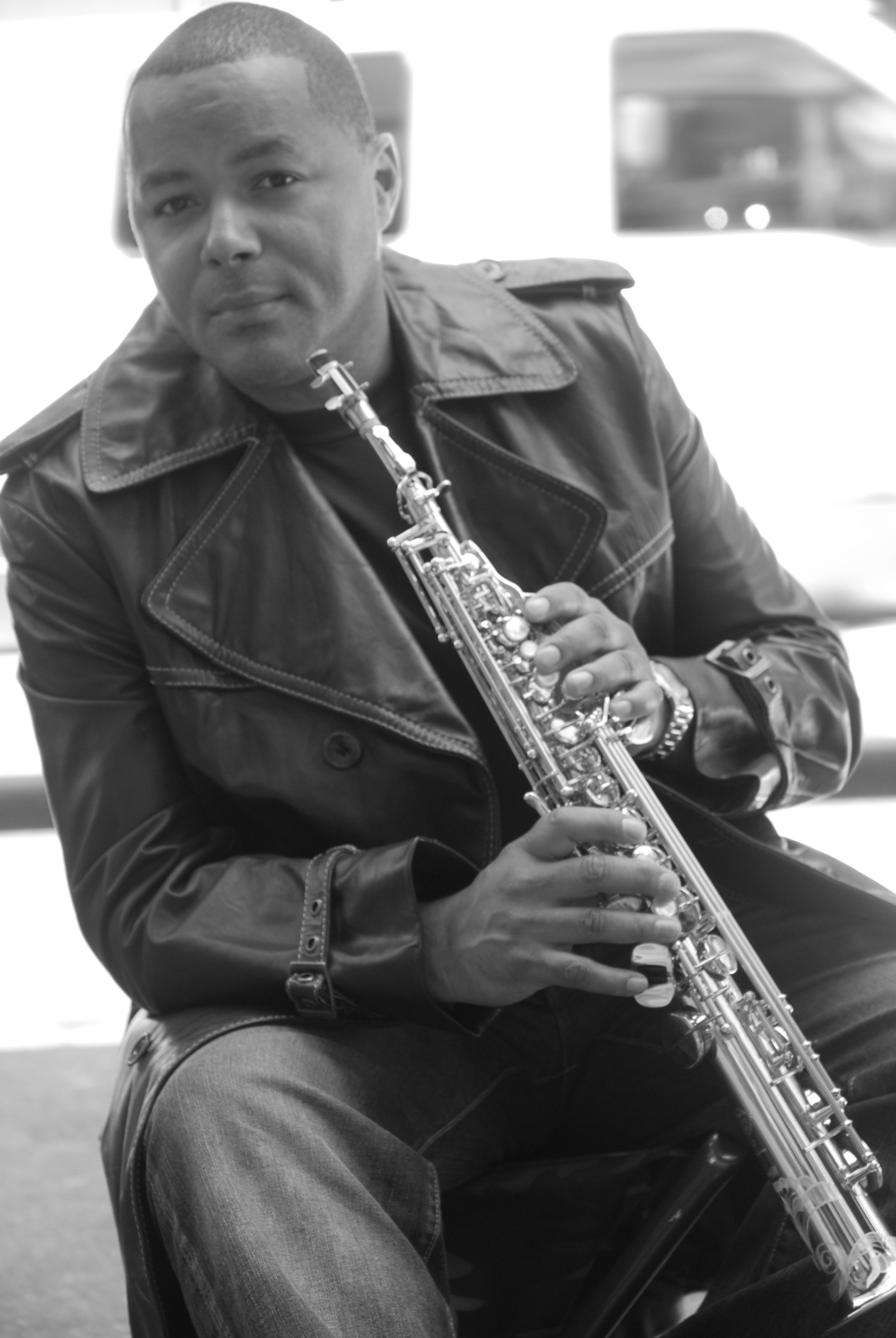
Photo from his 2007 album Rising Sun

After his studies at the New England Conservatory, Najee returned to New York City in the early 1980s. In 1983, he and his brother Fareed toured with Chaka Khan for the Ain't Nobody Tour. In 1986, he released his debut album, entitled Najee's Theme (EMI/Capitol). The album earned Najee a Grammy Award Nomination for Best Jazz Album. In 1987, Najee accepted an opportunity to open on the "Tasty Love" tour with R&B singer Freddie Jackson. In 1988, Najee's second album Day by Day was released and certified gold. Day by Day was produced by several producers including producer Barry Eastmond (Freddie Jackson, Aretha Franklin, Anita Baker and Billy Ocean). In 1990, Tokyo Blue was released. This album was produced by Najee's brother Fareed, and is one of his most successful recordings to date. Tokyo Blue and Day by Day led to Najee winning two Soul Train Awards for Best Jazz Artist in 1991 and 1993.

In 1992, Najee's next album Just an Illusion (EMI/Capitol). This album was produced by several producers, including Arif Mardin, George Duke, Fareed, Marcus Miller and Wayne Brathwaite. In 1994, Najee toured and was featured on the live recording Live at the Greek (Sony). The album featured Najee, Stanley Clarke, Billy Cobham and Larry Carlton. It was during this time that he made guest appearances with Quincy Jones at the Montreaux Jazz Festival.

Following this collaboration, his next album "Share My World" was released in 1994 and was followed by his tribute to Stevie Wonder's 1976 classic, Songs in the Key of Life in 1995. The CD was produced by George Duke and features Herbie Hancock, Stanley Clarke, Paul Jackson Jr., Sheila E. and Patrice Rushen among others. His CD Morning Tenderness was released in 1998, and went to number 1 on the contemporary jazz charts. Also within the same year The Best of Najee was released, (Blue Note Records/Capitol) and he once again toured on behalf of the USO for the troops in the Mediterranean: Spain and Turkey.

In 1998, Najee performed at Nelson Mandela's birthday celebration in South Africa, along with Stevie Wonder and Chaka Khan. Najee was also a special guest of President Bill Clinton to perform at the White House. This event was hosted by President Jerry Rawlings of the Republic of Ghana. Najee spent three years touring (2000–2003) with Prince and appeared on Prince's albums Rainbow Children and One Night Alone.

In 2003, Najee released Embrace which was produced by his brother Fareed, featuring guest artists Roy Ayers and BeBe Winans. My Point of View was his follow-up in 2005 featuring vocalist Will Downing. In 2006, Najee won an NAACP Image Award for "Best Jazz Artist". His 2007 album Rising Sun, featured singer Phil Perry. In 2009, he released Mind Over Matter, with a collaboration that featured vocalist Eric Benét and producer Jeff Lorber. In 2012, his album The Smooth Side of Soul was his first release with Shanachie Records which featured production from keyboardist and producer Jeff Lorber and saxophonist and producer Darren Rahn. This album featured vocalist Phil Perry on the lead single, "Just to Fall in Love", which was produced by Chris "Big Dog" Davis. The video for "Just to Fall in Love" also features actress Vanessa Bell Calloway and songstress N'dambi.

Najee's second release with Shanachie in 2013, The Morning After, A Musical Love Journey. The Morning After earned him an NAACP Image Award Nomination for "Outstanding Jazz Album" (2014) and a Soul Train Awards Nomination for "Best Contemporary Jazz Performance" (2014). The album produced by Demonte Posey, features R&B singer Meli'sa Morgan and bassist Brian Bromberg, with musicians Bill Sharpe on bass, Ray Fuller on guitar, Daniel Powell on drums, Nick Smith on piano and drummer Joel Taylor.

Najee released his third album with Shanachie, entitled: You, Me, and Forever, on June 23, 2015. The album features singer and songwriter Frank McComb, keyboardist James Lloyd from Pieces of a Dream, and pianist Robert Damper. You, Me, and Forever also features musicians from Najee's touring band including Rod Bonner on keys, Daniel Powell on drums, RaShawn Northington on electric bass, and Chuck Johnson on guitar who is also the lead vocalist on the popular Ambrosia song "Biggest Part of Me". "You, Me and Forever" was produced by Najee, Chris "Big Dog" Davis, and British-born bassist Dean Mark.

Najee has performed and recorded with vocalists including: Chaka Khan, Freddie Jackson, Will Downing, Phil Perry, Prince, Patti LaBelle, Toni Braxton, Vesta Williams, Alyson Williams and Jeffrey Osborne. He has also recorded and performed with instrumentalists: Marcus Miller, Herbie Hancock, Stanley Clarke, Larry Carlton, Billy Cobham, Charles Earland, Paul Jackson Jr. and George Duke.

== Discography ==
=== Studio albums ===
Year	Title	Peak chart positions				Certifications	Record label
Year	Title	US	US R&B	US Jazz	US Ind.	Certifications	Record label
1986	Najee's Theme	56	12	1	―	RIAA: Gold	EMI
1988	Day by Day	76	23	6	―		EMI
1990	Tokyo Blue	63	17	1	―		EMI
1992	Just an Illusion	107	25	5	―	RIAA: Gold	Orpheus/EMI
1994	Share My World	163	23	2	―		EMI
1995	Najee Plays the Songs from the Key of Life (A Tribute to Stevie Wonder)	—	67	6	―		EMI
1998	Morning Tenderness	―	65	2	―		Fan/Verve
2003	Embrace	―	82	7	―		N-Coded
2005	My Point of View	193	27	1	20		Heads Up
2007	Rising Sun	―	―	1	27		Heads Up
2009	Mind Over Matter	―	―	4	36		Heads Up
2012	The Smooth Side of Soul	―	―	4	―		Shanachie
2013	The Morning After (A Musical Love Journey)	―	―	3	―		Shanachie
2015	You, Me and Forever	―	―	―	―		Shanachie
2017	Poetry in Motion	―	―	―	―		Shanachie
2019	Center of the Heart	―	―	―	―		Shanachie
2022	Savoir Faire	―	―	―	―		Shanachie
"—" denotes releases that did not chart.

=== Live albums ===
- 1994: Live at the Greek – with Stanley Clarke, Larry Carlton, Billy Cobham (July 1994, Sony)
- 2002: One Nite Alone... Live! – with Prince

=== Compilation albums ===
Year	Title	US Jazz	Record label
1998	Best of Najee	15	Blue Note/Capitol
2000	Love Songs	23	Blue Note/Capitol
2003	Classic Masters	―	Capitol/EMI
"—" denotes releases that did not chart.

=== Singles ===
Year	Title	Peak chart positions		Album
Year	Title	US R&B	US Jazz	Album
1987	"Sweet Love"	55	―	Najee's Theme
1987	"Feel So Good to Me"	72	―	Najee's Theme
1987	"Betcha Don't Know"	45	―	Najee's Theme
1987	"Mysterious"	33	―	Najee's Theme
1988	"Personality"	60	―	Day By Day
1988	"So Hard to Let Go"	55	―	Day By Day
1989	"Najee's Nasty Groove"	88	―	Day By Day
1990	"Tokyo Blue"	78	―	Tokyo Blue
1990	"I'll Be Good to You" (with Vesta Williams)	9	―	Tokyo Blue
1990	"Cruise Control"	44	―	Tokyo Blue
1992	"I Adore Mi Amor"	39	―	Just an Illusion
1993	"All I Ever Ask" (featuring Freddie Jackson)	86	―	Just an Illusion
2009	"Sweet Summer Nights"	―	1	Mind Over Matter
2010	"Love Forever and a Day After"	―	13	Mind Over Matter
2012	"Perfect Nites"	―	1	The Smooth Side of Soul
2012	"One Night in Soho"	―	18	The Smooth Side of Soul
2013	"Champs Elysees"	―	15	The Morning After (A Musical Love Journey)
"—" denotes releases that did not chart.

=== Other appearances ===
- Prince – "Rainbow Children" from the album The Rainbow Children (2002)
- Will Downing – "Street Life" from the album Black Pearls (2016)
- Will Downing – "Christmas Time Is Here" from the album Christmas, Love, and You (2004)
- Ruben Studdard – "Close the Door" from the album Unconditional Love (2014)
- Brian Simpson – "Out of a Dream" from the album Out of a Dream (2015)
- Paul Brown – "Casablanca" from the album Truth B Told (2014)
- Charles Earland – "If Only for One Night" from the album If Only for One Night (2002)
- Pieces of a Dream – The Best of Pieces of a Dream, Vol. 2 (2014)
- The Weather Channel Presents: The Best of Smooth Jazz (2007) "Sidewayz"
- Key-Matic – "Breakin' in Space" (1984, Radar Records (US))
- Incognito – "Village Life" from the compilation album The Best (2004–2017) (2017)
- Roberto Tola – "With You All the Clouds Go Away" from the album Bein' Green (2017)
- Nick Colionne – "Buckle Up" from the album The Journey (2016)
- Bob Baldwin – "My Cherie Amour" from the album Newurbanjazz.com (2008)
- Robert Damper – "Wave" and "You, Me and Forever" from the album "D" Tales (2017)
