= Standard Eyes =

1967 compilation album by Ahmad Jamal

Compilation album by Ahmad Jamal
- Released: 1967
- Recorded: 1958–1961
- Genre: Jazz
- Label: Cadet; LPS-786

Ahmad Jamal chronology
| Heat Wave (1966) | Standard Eyes (1967) | Cry Young (1967) |

Standard Eyes is a compilation album by American jazz pianist Ahmad Jamal featuring performances recorded from 1958 to 1961 for the Argo label and was released in 1967. It draws its selections from the original Argo albums Ahmad Jamal Trio Volume IV, Portfolio of Ahmad Jamal, Happy Moods, At the Pershing, Vol. 2, Ahmad Jamal's Alhambra, and All of You.

Professional ratings
Review scores
| Source | Rating |
|---|---|
| AllMusic | 3/5 stars |

== Critical reception ==
The AllMusic review, giving the album 3 out of 5 stars, has Ken Dryden observing: "One of Ahmad Jamal's most popular trios, with bassist Israel Crosby and drummer Vernel Fournier, is featured in this Cadet LP anthology of live recordings made between 1958 and 1961 for Argo. Even though the pianist sticks almost exclusively to very familiar standards, his fresh approach to each of them makes his interpretations very distinctive."

== Track listing ==
1. "Billy Boy" (Traditional) from At the Pershing, Vol. 2 (1961)
2. "Sweet and Lovely" (Gus Arnheim, Harry Tobias, Jules LeMare) from Ahmad Jamal's Alhambra (1961)
3. "I Didn't Know What Time It Was" (Lorenz Hart, Richard Rodgers) from Portfolio of Ahmad Jamal (1959)
4. "Taboo" (E. Lecuona) from Ahmad Jamal Trio Volume IV (1958)
5. "I'll Remember April" (Gene DePaul, Patricia Johnston, Don Raye) from At the Pershing, Vol. 2 (1961)
6. "So Beats My Heart for You" (Pat Ballard, Charles E. Henderson, Tom Waring) from Portfolio of Ahmad Jamal (1959)
7. "For All We Know" (J. Fred Coots, Sam M. Lewis) from Happy Moods (1960)
8. "The Breeze and I" (Ernesto Lecuona, Al Stillman) from Ahmad Jamal's Alhambra (1961)
9. "Angel Eyes" (Earl Brent, Matt Dennis) from All of You (1962)
10. "The Girl Next Door" (Martin & Blaine, Leo Feist) from Ahmad Jamal Trio Volume IV (1958)

== Personnel ==
- Ahmad Jamal – piano
- Israel Crosby – double bass
- Vernel Fournier – drums
