= The Piano Scene of Ahmad Jamal =

Studio album by Ahmad Jamal
- Released: 1959
- Recorded: October 25, 1951; May 5, 1952; October 1955
- Genre: Jazz
- Label: Epic; LN 3631

Ahmad Jamal chronology
Jamal at the Penthouse (1959)	The Piano Scene of Ahmad Jamal (1959)	Happy Moods (1960)

Professional ratings
Review scores
Source	Rating
AllMusic	4.5/5 stars

The Piano Scene of Ahmad Jamal is an album by American jazz pianist Ahmad Jamal. It contains performances from his earliest recording sessions for Okeh in 1951–52 in Chicago, and an Epic session from October 1955 in New York, NY. It includes additional selections from the sessions where the 1956 album The Ahmad Jamal Trio was recorded. The album was re-released in 2005 with additional tracks.

This album was released at the beginning of his career. Jazz historian Scott Yanow notes that Jamal's use of space and dynamics "was very different than the style of any other jazz pianist of the era," and that it illustrates "a style that would be a major influence on Miles Davis' music".

== Track listing ==
1959 Edition

1. "Old Devil Moon" (Burton Lane, Yip Harburg) 3:46
2. "Ahmad's Blues" (Ahmad Jamal) 2:57
3. "Poinciana" (Nat Simon, Buddy Bernier) 4:36
4. "Billy Boy" (Traditional) 2:41
5. "Will You Still Be Mine?" (Matt Dennis, Tom Adair) 2:45
6. "Pavanne" (Morton Gould) 4:27
7. "Crazy He Calls Me" (Bob Russell, Carl Sigman) 4:59
8. "The Surrey With The Fringe On Top" (Rodgers & Hammerstein) 2:52
9. "Aki and Ukthay" (Brother and Sister) (Ahmad Jamal) 3:08
10. "Slaughter on Tenth Avenue" (Rodgers) 4:53
11. "A Gal in Calico" (Arthur Schwartz, Leo Robin) 2:37
12. "It's Easy to Remember" (Rodgers, Lorenz Hart) 2:56

2005 Edition

1. "The Surrey With The Fringe On Top" 2:52
2. "Will You Still Be Mine?" 2:45
3. "Ahmad's Blues" 2:57
4. "A Gal in Calico" 2:37
5. "Aki and Ukthay" 3:08
6. "Billy Boy" 2:41
7. "Black Beauty" (Duke Ellington) 3:27
8. "Love for Sale" (Cole Porter) 8:32
9. "Something to Remember You By" (Arthur Schwartz, Howard Dietz) 2:49
10. "Poinciana" 4:36
11. "Don't Blame Me" (Jimmy McHugh, Dorothy Fields)
12. "Autumn Leaves" (Joseph Kosma, Johnny Mercer) 2:41
13. "They Can't Take That Away From Me" (George Gershwin, Ira Gershwin)
14. "Old Devil Moon" 3:46
15. "It's Easy to Remember (And So Hard to Forget)" (Rodgers & Hart)
16. "Squeeze Me" (Fats Waller) 3:51
17. "Crazy He Calls Me" 4:59
18. "Pavanne" 4:27
19. "Perfidia" (Alberto Domínguez) 3:57
20. "Rica Pulpa" (Eliseo Grenet) 3:51
21. "The Donkey Serenade" (Herbert Stothart, Rudolf Friml) 3:18

== Personnel ==
- Ahmad Jamal - piano
- Ray Crawford - guitar
- Eddie Calhoun, Israel Crosby - double bass
