= Complete Live at the Pershing Lounge 1958 =

Live album by Ahmad Jamal
- Released: 2007
- Recorded: January 16 & 17, 1958
- Venue: The Pershing Lounge, Chicago, Illinois
- Genre: Jazz
- Label: Gambit Records; American Jazz Classics; Phoenix Jazz
- Producer: Dave Usher

Ahmad Jamal chronology
| The Legendary Okeh & Epic Recordings (1951–1955) (2005) | Complete Live at the Pershing Lounge 1958 (2007) | Complete Live at the Spotlight Club 1958 (2007) |

Professional ratings
Review scores
| Source | Rating |
|---|---|
| Allmusic | 5/5 stars |
| The Penguin Guide to Jazz Recordings | 3.5/4 stars |

Complete Live at the Pershing Lounge 1958 is an album by jazz pianist Ahmad Jamal. It contains performances recorded at The Pershing Lounge in Chicago, Illinois, in 1958. Some of the performances were released on the albums At the Pershing: But Not for Me and At the Pershing, Vol. 2.

== Recording ==
The music was played in concerts by the trio of pianist Ahmad Jamal, bassist Israel Crosby, and drummer Vernel Fournier at the Pershing Lounge, inside Chicago's Pershing Hotel, on East 64th Street, on January 16 and 17, 1958.

== Reception ==
The AllMusic review gave the album five stars, stating: "Gambit Records issued all 19 tracks from the Pershing engagements on one CD, bringing before the public a body of work that two generations of jazz heads had gathered piecemeal on Argo and Chess LPs or various partial CD reissues. Tacked on to this historical edition is an edited version of 'Poinciana' released as a single after it became apparent that it had hit potential."

== Track list ==
1. "But Not For Me" (George Gershwin, Ira Gershwin) – 3:32
2. "The Surrey with the Fringe on Top" (Rodgers and Hammerstein) – 2:35
3. "Moonlight In Vermont" (John Blackburn, Karl Suessdorf) – 3:09
4. "Music! Music! Music!" (Stephen Weiss, Bernie Baum) – 2:56
5. "No Greater Love" (Isham Jones, Marty Symes) – 3:26
6. "Poinciana" (Nat Simon, Buddy Bernier) – 8:07
7. "Woody 'n' You" (Dizzy Gillespie) – 3:40
8. "What's New?" (Bob Haggart, Johnny Burke) – 4:12
9. "Too Late Now" (Alan Jay Lerner, Burton Lane) – 2:32
10. "All the Things You Are" (Jerome Kern, Oscar Hammerstein II) – 3:12
11. "Cherokee" (Ray Noble) – 3:42
12. "It Might as Well Be Spring" (Rodgers and Hammerstein) – 3:27
13. "I'll Remember April" (Gene de Paul, Patricia Johnston, Don Raye) – 2:41
14. "My Funny Valentine" (Rodgers and Hart) – 3:27
15. "Gone with the Wind" (Allie Wrubel, Herb Magidson) – 3:24
16. "Billy Boy" (Traditional) – 3:00
17. "It's You Or No One" (Sammy Cahn, Jule Styne) – 3:34
18. "They Can't Take That Away from Me" (George Gershwin, Ira Gershwin) – 4:45
19. "Poor Butterfly" (Raymond Hubbell, John Golden) – 3:39
20. "Poinciana" (Edited Single Version) – 3:01

== Personnel ==
- Ahmad Jamal – piano
- Israel Crosby – double bass
- Vernel Fournier – drums
