= Ahmad's Blues =

1958 studio album by Ahmad Jamal

Studio album by Ahmad Jamal
- Released: 1958, 1994
- Recorded: September 6, 1958
- Venue: Spotlite Club - Washington D.C.
- Genre: Jazz
- Length: 62:20
- Label: Chess
- Producer: Dave Usher

Ahmad Jamal chronology
The Ahmad Jamal Trio (1956)	Ahmad's Blues (1958)	At the Pershing: But Not for Me (1958)

Professional ratings
Review scores
Source	Rating
AllMusic	4.5/5 stars

Ahmad's Blues is an album by American jazz pianist Ahmad Jamal recorded in September 1958 at the Spotlite Club in Washington, D.C.

It was released in 1958 by Chess Records and, in 1994, re-released by GRP Records as part of The Original Chess Masters Jazz Series. Chess was a Chicago record company specializing in jazz and blues which, from 1950 to 1970, released the music of some of the most prominent American musicians of the period.

== Critical reception ==
A reviewer for AllMusic wrote: "One of Miles Davis's favorite musicians, Ahmad Jamal has a unique approach as a pianist, composer, and arranger that is highly influential and distinctive. Possessed of a light, almost classical touch, and a purveyor of negative space and minimal phrasing (his influence on Davis can certainly be seen here), Jamal worked largely in trio settings, and used his conceptions of space and subtlety to create dynamic tensions within the group. At the same time, the artist's work is rooted firmly in the blues and swings intently, without fail. Ahmad's Blues, the trio's 1958 live date in Washington D.C., demonstrates all of these qualities in spades. Supremely attentive playing by bassist Israel Crosby and drummer Vernel Fournier (his brush work on the intricate, gear-shifting 'Autumn Leaves' is especially noteworthy) provides groundwork, foil, and shifting frames for Jamal's virtuoso explorations. The ensemble's work brings new ideas—the musicians often incorporate understated mambo, fractured swing rhythms, or airy, abstract structures—to standards ('Stompin' at the Savoy;' 'Cheek to Cheek') and to Jamal's own compositions (the delicate 'Seleritus'). Ahmad's Blues allows us to eavesdrop on the sophisticated, innovative artist and company at work."

== Track listing ==
1. "Ahmad's Blues" (Ahmad Jamal) 4:05
2. "It Could Happen to You" (Johnny Burke, Jimmy Van Heusen) 4:15
3. "I Wish I Knew" (Harry Warren, Mack Gordon) 3:45
4. "Autumn Leaves" (Jacques Prévert, Johnny Mercer, Joseph Kosma) 7:40
5. "Stompin' at the Savoy" (Benny Goodman, Chick Webb, Edgar Sampson) 4:15
6. "Cheek to Cheek" (Irving Berlin) 4:47
7. "The Girl Next Door" (Hugh Martin, Ralph Blane) 3:26
8. "Secret Love" (Paul Francis Webster, Sammy Fain) 3:51
9. "Squatty Roo" (Johnny Hodges) 2:18
10. "Taboo" (Margarita Lecuona, S.K. Russell) 4:01
11. "Autumn In New York" (Vernon Duke) 3:18
12. "A Gal In Calico" (Arthur Schwartz, Leo Robin) 4:44
13. "That's All" (Allen Brandt, Bob Haymes) 2:38
14. "Should I?" (Arthur Freed, Nacio Herb Brown) 3:39
15. "Seleritus" (Jamal) 3:12
16. "Let's Fall In Love" (Harold Arlen, Ted Koehler) 5:06

== Personnel ==
- Ahmad Jamal – piano
- Israel Crosby – double bass
- Vernell Fournier – drums
