= Poinciana (Ahmad Jamal album) =

Compilation album by Ahmad Jamal
- Released: 1963
- Recorded: 1958
- Genre: Jazz
- Length: 33:57
- Label: Argo

Ahmad Jamal chronology
Macanudo (1962)	Poinciana (1963)	Naked City Theme (1964)

Professional ratings
Review scores
Source	Rating
Record Mirror	4/5 stars

Poinciana is a compilation album by jazz pianist Ahmad Jamal, mainly recorded at the Spotlite Club in Washington, DC in 1958. Most tracks originally appeared on the 1959 LP Portfolio of Ahmad Jamal. The title song is the 45 rpm edit of the performance released on the At the Pershing: But Not for Me LP.

== Track listing ==
1. "Poinciana" (Nat Simon, Buddy Bernier) – 2:58
2. "You Don't Know What Love Is" (Don Raye, Gene de Paul) – 4:21
3. "A Gal in Calico" (Arthur Schwartz, Leo Robin) – 4:45
4. "Ivy" (Hoagy Carmichael) – 2:45
5. "Tater Pie" (Ashby) – 2:56
6. "Autumn Leaves" (Joseph Kosma, Jacques Prévert, Johnny Mercer) – 7:34
7. "This Can't Be Love" (Richard Rodgers, Lorenz Hart) – 4:48
8. "Old Devil Moon" (Yip Harburg, Burton Lane) – 3:50

== Personnel ==
- Ahmad Jamal – piano
- Israel Crosby – bass
- Vernel Fournier – drums
