= Complete Live at the Spotlite Club 1958 =

Live album by Ahmad Jamal
- Released: 2007
- Recorded: September 5 & 6, 1958; The Spotlite Club, Washington D.C.
- Genre: Jazz
- Label: Gambit
- Producer: Dave Usher

Ahmad Jamal chronology
Complete Live at the Pershing Lounge 1958 (2007)	Complete Live at the Spotlite Club 1958 (2007)	Poinciana – One Night Only (2008)

Complete Live at the Spotlite Club 1958 is a live album by American jazz pianist Ahmad Jamal featuring performances recorded at the Spotlight club in Washington D.C. in 1958. It is a compilation of songs originally released, by Argo Records, on the albums Ahmad Jamal Trio Volume IV and Portfolio of Ahmad Jamal. It was Argo response to the huge success of Jamal's 1958 release But Not For Me.

== Reception ==
Professional ratings
Review scores
Source	Rating
AllMusic	5/5 stars
The Penguin Guide to Jazz Recordings	3.5/4 stars

The AllMusic review awarded the album 5 stars stating "Best heard at sunset, late at night by candlelight, or in a cozy room softly illumined by indirect incandescence, this music offers the listener an opportunity to savor both what Jamal plays and what he doesn't play. His sense of timing, the way he employs contrasting dynamics and his quirky flair for the dramatic have always made Ahmad Jamal an exciting performer. His Spotlite recordings are filled with surprises and exhilarating passages".

Writing for Jazzwise, Brian Priestley said that this album illustrates "what made the trio both popular and influential on other musicians such as Miles Davis and Oscar Peterson," and that the "coloration from the bass and drums...had the biggest impact. Musically, he doesn't put a foot wrong."

== Track listing ==
Disc One:

1. "Ahmad's Blues" (Ahmad Jamal) - 4:04 (Portfolio of Ahmad Jamal)
2. "It Could Happen to You" (Johnny Burke, Jimmy Van Heusen) - 4:17 (Portfolio of Ahmad Jamal)
3. "I Wish I Knew" (Mack Gordon, Harry Warren) - 3:45 (Ahmad Jamal Trio Volume IV)
4. "Autumn Leaves" (Joseph Kosma, Johnny Mercer, Jacques Prévert) - 7:39 (Portfolio of Ahmad Jamal)
5. "Stompin' at the Savoy" (Edgar Sampson) - 4:15 (Ahmad Jamal Trio Volume IV)
6. "Cheek to Cheek" (Irving Berlin) - 4:47 (Ahmad Jamal Trio Volume IV)
7. "The Girl Next Door" (Ralph Blane, Hugh Martin) - 3:26 (Ahmad Jamal Trio Volume IV)
8. "Secret Love" (Sammy Fain, Paul Francis Webster) - 3:52 (Ahmad Jamal Trio Volume IV)
9. "Squatty Roo" (Johnny Hodges) - 2:19 (Ahmad Jamal Trio Volume IV)
10. "Taboo" (Margarita Lecuona, Bob Russell) - 4:01 (Ahmad Jamal Trio Volume IV)
11. "Autumn in New York" (Vernon Duke) - 3:18
12. "A Gal in Calico" (Leo Robin, Arthur Schwartz) - 4:44 (Portfolio of Ahmad Jamal)
13. "That's All" (Alan Brandt, Bob Haymes) - 2:38 (Ahmad Jamal Trio Volume IV)
14. "Should I?" (Nacio Herb Brown, Arthur Freed) - 3:41 (Ahmad Jamal Trio Volume IV)

Disc Two:

1. "Seleritus" (Ahmad Jamal) - 3:13 (Portfolio of Ahmad Jamal)
2. "Let's Fall in Love" (Harold Arlen, Ted Koehler) - 5:09 (Portfolio of Ahmad Jamal)
3. "This Can't Be Love" (Lorenz Hart, Richard Rodgers) - 5:12 (Portfolio of Ahmad Jamal)
4. "Old Devil Moon" (Yip Harburg, Burton Lane) - 3:56 (Portfolio of Ahmad Jamal)
5. "Ivy" (Hoagy Carmichael) - 3:08 (Portfolio of Ahmad Jamal)
6. "Tater Pie" (Harold Ashby) - 3:07 (Portfolio of Ahmad Jamal)
7. "Aki & Ukthay (Brother and Sister) (Jamal) - 3:16 (Portfolio of Ahmad Jamal)
8. "You Don't Know What Love Is (Gene de Paul, Don Raye) - 3:30 (Portfolio of Ahmad Jamal)
9. "I Didn't Know What Time It Was" (Hart, Rodgers) - 4:35 (Portfolio of Ahmad Jamal)
10. "So Beats My Heart for You" (Pat Ballard, Charles Henderson, Tom Waring) - 3:42 (Portfolio of Ahmad Jamal)
11. "Our Delight" (Tadd Dameron) - 3:00 (Portfolio of Ahmad Jamal)
12. "Soft Winds" (Benny Goodman, Fletcher Henderson) – 3:22 (Portfolio of Ahmad Jamal)
13. "Secret Love" (Fain, Webster) - 2:50 (Ahmad Jamal Trio Volume IV)
14. "Taking a Chance on Love" (Duke) - 1:52 (Portfolio of Ahmad Jamal)

== Personnel ==
- Ahmad Jamal – piano
- Israel Crosby – bass
- Vernel Fournier – drums
