= At the Pershing, Vol. 2 =

Live album by Ahmad Jamal
- Released: 1961
- Recorded: January 17, 1958
- Venue: Pershing Hotel, Chicago
- Genre: Jazz
- Label: Argo; LP-667

Ahmad Jamal chronology
Happy Moods (1960)	At the Pershing, Vol. 2 (1961)	Listen to the Ahmad Jamal Quintet (1961)

Professional ratings
Review scores
Source	Rating
AllMusic	4/5 stars

At the Pershing, Vol. 2 is an album by pianist Ahmad Jamal on the Argo label composed of selections from the same January 1958 engagement at the Pershing Lounge of Chicago's Pershing Hotel where the hit album At the Pershing: But Not for Me was recorded.

== Critical reception ==
The AllMusic review awarded the album 4 stars with Scott Yanow stating, "Recorded at the same engagement as his best-selling But Not for Me, this outing by pianist Ahmad Jamal (with bassist Israel Crosby and drummer Vernell Fournier [sic]) is just as successful musically, even if its sales figures were not on the same level. Jamal and his sidemen had a magical chemistry during this era, and the pianist's close attention to dynamics gave the group its own sound. Among the highlights of the 11 standards are 'Too Late Now,' 'Cherokee,' 'Gone with the Wind' and a remake of 'Billy Boy.' A superior LP that deserves to be reissued in full on CD."

The Penguin Guide to Jazz lists the complete set of recordings from which this album was drawn, Complete Live at the Pershing Lounge 1958, in its 1001 Best Albums.

== Track listing ==
1. "Too Late Now" (Burton Lane, Alan Jay Lerner)
2. "All the Things You Are" (Oscar Hammerstein II, Jerome Kern)
3. "Cherokee" (Ray Noble)
4. "It Might As Well Be Spring" (Oscar Hammerstein II, Richard Rodgers)
5. "I'll Remember April" (Gene DePaul, Patricia Johnston, Don Raye)
6. "My Funny Valentine" (Lorenz Hart, Richard Rodgers)
7. "Gone With The Wind" (Herbert Magidson, Allie Wrubel)
8. "Billy Boy" (Traditional)
9. "It’s You Or No One" (Sammy Cahn, Jule Styne)
10. "They Can’t Take That Away From Me" (George Gershwin, Ira Gershwin)
11. "Poor Butterfly" (John Golden, Raymond Hubbell)

== Personnel ==
- Ahmad Jamal – piano
- Israel Crosby - double bass
- Vernel Fournier - drums
