= Poinciana =

Poinciana may refer to:

- Delonix regia or royal poinciana, a tree
- Caesalpinia pulcherrima, a shrub
- Poinciana, a synonym of the legume genus Caesalpinia
- Poinciana, Florida, a place
- "Poinciana" (song), a 1936 standard song composed by Nat Simon and Buddy Bernier
- Poinciana (Ahmad Jamal album), featuring the above song
- Poinciana (Nick Brignola album), featuring the above song
