= Jamal at the Penthouse =

Studio album by Ahmad Jamal
- Released: 1959
- Recorded: February 22–28, 1959
- Genre: Jazz
- Length: 28:29
- Label: Argo; LPS-646
- Producer: Dave Usher

Ahmad Jamal chronology
Portfolio of Ahmad Jamal (1959)	Jamal at the Penthouse (1959)	The Piano Scene of Ahmad Jamal (1959)

Jamal at the Penthouse is an album by jazz pianist Ahmad Jamal, recorded live at Nola's Penthouse Studio in New York and released by Argo Records in 1959. This album, unlike other Ahmad Jamal albums, features his trio with a 15-piece string section led by conductor Joe Kennedy.

== Content ==
Jamal at the Penthouse breaks away Jamal from his usual trio setting to an orchestra setting, with his trio still present. Scott Yanow from Allmusic gave the album a three stars out of five rating, saying:

"This LP was a change of pace for pianist Ahmad Jamal, whose trio (with bassist Israel Crosby and drummer Vernel Fournier) is joined by a 15-piece string section arranged and conducted by Joe Kennedy. The interpretations are generally pretty, but with enough variety to hold one's interest."

== Track listing ==
1. "Comme Ci, Comme Ça" (Bruno Coquatrix, Pierre Dudan, Alex Kramer, Joan Whitney Kramer) – 2:12
2. "Ivy" (Hoagy Carmichael) – 3:59
3. "Never Never Land" (Betty Comden, Adolph Green, Jule Styne) – 3:09
4. "Tangerine" (Victor Schertzinger, Johnny Mercer) – 2:43
5. "Ahmad's Blues" (Ahmad Jamal) – 4:22
6. "Seleritius" (Ahmad Jamal) – 3:02
7. "I Like to Recognize the Tune" (Richard Rodgers, Lorenz Hart) – 1:43
8. "I'm Alone With You" (Bud Estes) – 3:11
9. "Sophisticated Gentleman" (Joe Kennedy) – 4:13

== Personnel ==
- Ahmad Jamal – piano
- Israel Crosby – bass
- Vernel Fournier – drums
- Joe Kennedy – conductor, arranger
