= Poor Butterfly =

1916 song by Raymond Hubbell and John Golden

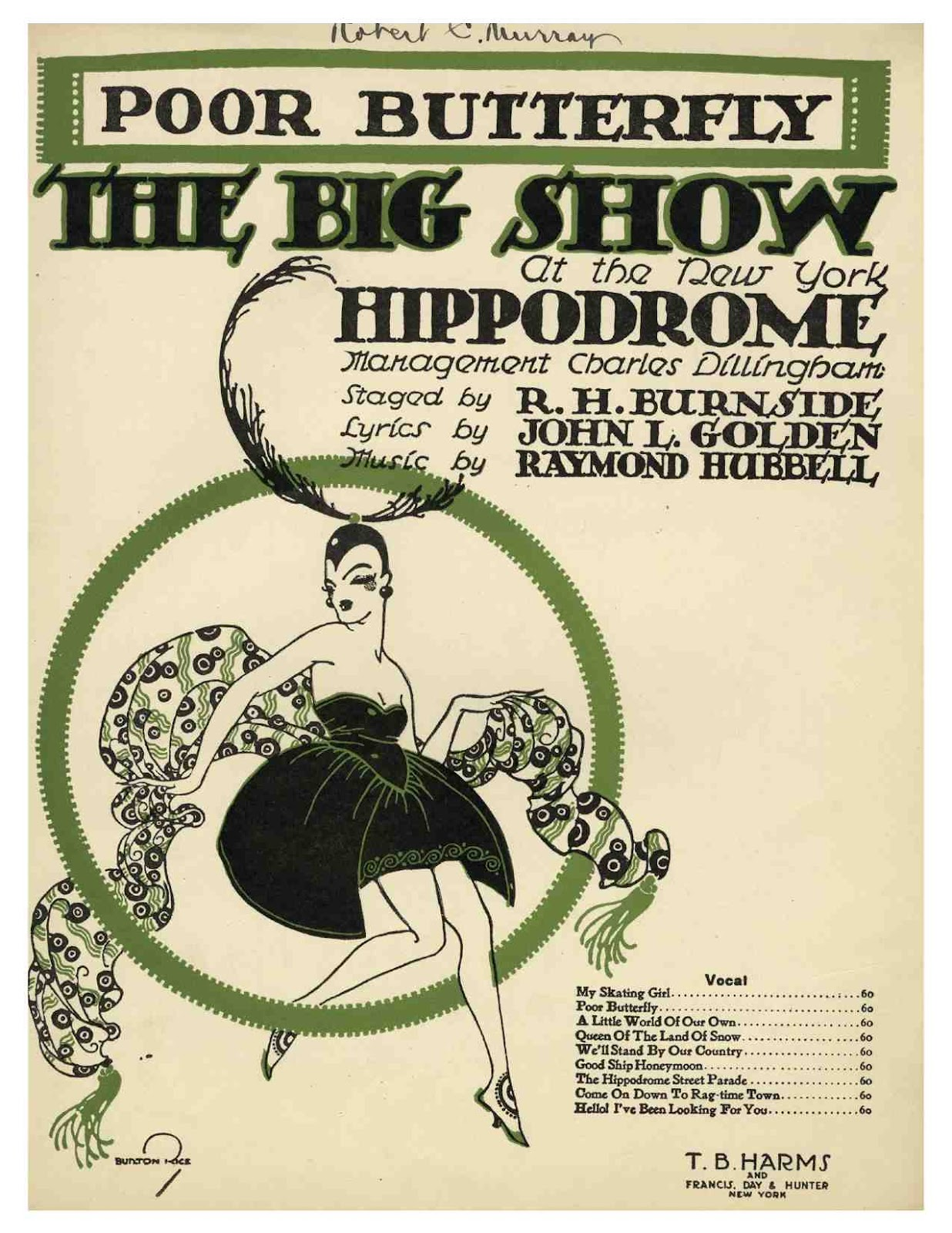
- Original sheet music cover

Song by Sophie Bernard
- Published: 1916
- Genre: Popular music
- Composer: Raymond Hubbell
- Lyricist: John Golden

"Poor Butterfly" is a popular song. It was inspired by Giacomo Puccini's opera Madame Butterfly and contains a brief musical quote from the Act two duet Tutti i fior in the verse.

The music was written by Raymond Hubbell, the lyrics by John L. Golden. The song was published in 1916. It was introduced in the Broadway show The Big Show, which opened in August 1916 at the New York Hippodrome, and was sung in the show by Sophie Bernard.

The song has become a jazz standard, recorded by many artists.

== Recorded versions ==
=== Biggest hit versions in 1917 ===
The two biggest hit versions in 1917 were recorded by Elsie Baker (using the pseudonym Edna Brown) and by the Victor Military Band.

Baker's recording was made on December 15, 1916, and released on Victor as catalog number 18211, with the flip side being a recording of "Alice in Wonderland" by Howard & McDonough.

The Victor Military Band recording was recorded on November 29, 1916, and issued by Victor as catalog number 35605, with the flip side "Katinka".

Another version which received a significant amount of popularity was by Grace Kerns recording under the name Catherine (or Katherine) Clark. This version was recorded in November 1916 and released by Columbia Records as catalog number A-2167, with the flip side "Century Girl".

Somewhat less popular, but still noted at the time, were a recording by Elizabeth Spencer, released by Thomas Edison's recording company as a disk, catalog number 50386, and an Amberol cylinder, catalog number 3039, and a recording by Prince's Orchestra (or Prince's Band), recorded December 1916 and released by Columbia Records as catalog number A-5930, with the flip side "You and I".

An arrangement for violin and orchestra was recorded by Fritz Kreisler on March 1, 1917, and issued on Victor as catalog number 64555.

=== 1954 revival ===
The song was revived in the 1950s by The Hilltoppers for a top-20 chart hit. Their recording was released by Dot Records as catalog number 15156, with the flip side "Wrapped up in a Dream". It first reached the Billboard magazine Best Seller chart on April 14, 1954, and lasted 5 weeks on the chart, peaking at #15. (Other sources give the first date on the chart as April 24 and the highest position as #12.) The same recording was released in Canada by Quality Records as catalog number K1235, with the same flip side.

=== Other recorded versions ===
- Cannonball Adderley from the album Cannonball Takes Charge (Riverside 1959)
- Frances Alda on 16 February 1917, issued as Victor 64653. Alda also recorded selections from the Puccini opera, including Butterfly's entrance aria and "Un bel di vedremo".
- Julie Andrews in 1967 for the film Thoroughly Modern Millie and released on the soundtrack album.
- Vikki Carr released song in album Discovery (1964) as medley "Poor Butterfly / Stay"
- Herman Chittison Trio (recorded February 2, 1945, released by Musicraft Records as catalog number 323, with the flip side "These Foolish Things")
- Arnett Cobb and his orchestra (recorded June 14, 1953, released by Mercury Records as catalog number 70101, with the flip side "Congratulations to Someone")
- Paul Desmond from the album Glad to Be Unhappy (RCA 1963)
- Columbia Saxophone Sextette (recorded January 24, 1917, released by Columbia Records as catalog number A-2203, with the flip side "Katinka: Allah's Holiday")
- Hank D'Amico Sextette (released by MGM Records as catalog number 10641, with the flip side "If Dreams Come True")
- Anita Darian in 1960 on the self-titled album "Anita Darian" (later titled "East of the Sun"), Kapp Records KL-1168
- Guido Deiro (recorded January 1917, released by Columbia Records as catalog number A-2202, with the flip side "Madame Butterfly")
- Deanna Durbin (recorded October 9, 1941, released by Decca Records as catalog number 18297B, with the flip side "Annie Laurie")
- The Ebon-Knights (released 1958 by Stepheny Records as catalog number 1817, with the flip side "The Way the Ball Bounces")
- Emerson Symphony Orchestra (recorded January 1917, released by Emerson Records as catalog number 7123, with the flip side "Shadowland")
- Erroll Garner Trio (recorded June 28, 1950, released by Columbia Records as catalog number 39145, with the flip side "How High the Moon", also released by Columbia Records as catalog number 39166, with the flip side "Long Ago (and Far Away)")
- Booker Ervin from the album The Book Cooks (Bethlehem 1961)
- Benny Goodman and his orchestra (recorded June 1944, released by Silvertone Records as catalog number 545, with the flip side "The Sheik"; re-recorded October 15, 1946, released by Harmony Records as catalog number Ha1061, with the flip side "Cherry")
- Charles Harrison (recorded February 1917, released by Columbia Records as catalog number A-2206, with the flip side "My Rosary for You")
- Al Hibbler with Billy Strayhorn's Orchestra (released in 1949 by Sunrise Records as catalog number 503, also by Miracle Records as catalog number M-503, both with the flip side "Tonight I Shall Sleep"; also released by Chess Records in 1951 as catalog number 1569, with the flip side "Fat and Forty")
- Al Hirt released a version on his 1962 album, Trumpet and Strings and was also featured on his greatest hits album, The Best of Al Hirt
- Ahmad Jamal from the album At the Pershing, Vol. 2 (Argo 1958) (released 1960 by Argo Records as catalog number 5370, with the flip side "Billy Boy")
- Harry James released a version in 1981 on his album For Listening And Dancing (Reader's Digest RD4A 213)
- Bunk Johnson & Don Ewell, April 1946
- Jack Kane (released 1958 by Coral Records as catalog number 62038, on the Grammy Award nominated album Kane is Able.)
- Yusef Lateef from the album The Fabric of Jazz (Savoy 1959)
- Andy Kirk and Clouds of Joy (released by Decca Records as catalog number 1663A, with the flip side "Lover, Come Back to Me"; also released 1950 by Coral Records as catalog number 60344, with the flip side "I'll Get By (As Long As I Have You)")
- Johnny Long and his orchestra (released by Signature Records as catalog number 15196A, with the flip side "Night and Day", also released 1952 by Coral Records as catalog number 60706, with the flip side "Home"; re-released by Coral in 1954 as catalog number 61172, with the flip side "Only Forever")
- Freddie Martin his orchestra. Released by Capitol Records circa 1960.
- Grady Martin and his Slewfoot 5 (released by Decca Records as catalog number 28689, with the flip side "Bandera")
- Susannah McCorkle included a version on her 1985 album How Do You Keep the Music Playing.
- George McMurphy and his orchestra (recorded June 18, 1928, released by Columbia Records as catalog number 1498D, with the flip side "Allah's Holiday")
- Eddie "Piano" Miller (released 1950 by Rainbow Records as catalog number 90099, with the flip side "I'm A Ding Dong Daddy From Dumas", also released 1952 by Quality Records (Canada) as catalog number K1063, with the flip side "Pagan Love Song")
- Lee Morse and her Bluegrass Boys (recorded January 25, 1928, released by Columbia Records as catalog number 1328D, with the flip side "After We Kiss")
- Red Nichols and his orchestra (vocal: Scrappy Lambert) (recorded March 2, 1928, released by Brunswick Records as catalog number 20062A, with the flip side "Can't Yo' Heah Me Callin' Caroline"; re-recorded October 2, 1939, released by Bluebird Records as catalog number 10522B, with the flip side "A Pretty Girl Is Like a Melody")
- Pathé Dance Orchestra (released by Pathé Records as catalog number 20150, with the flip side "Home Again")
- The Pied Pipers (released by Capitol Records as catalog number 10159, with the flip side "My Melancholy Baby")
- Leo Reisman and his orchestra (recorded April 13, 1941, released by Victor Records as catalog number 27435, with the flip side "Limehouse Blues", also as catalog number 27627, with the flip side "April in Paris")
- Rita Reys in 1961 for her live album Jazz Pictures At An Exhibition and in 1979 for her album That Old Feeling.
- Sonny Rollins with J. J. Johnson from the album Sonny Rollins, Vol. 2 (Blue Note 1957)
- Cécile McLorin Salvant A Cappella Version 2015
- Doc Severinsen and the Tonight Show Band included a version on their September 16, 1991 album "Once More... With Feeling".
- Sherbo's Castle-by-Sea Orchestra (recorded January 1917, released by Pathé Records as catalog number 20132, with the flip side "Topsy")
- Frank Sinatra and the Duke Ellington Orchestra recorded in 1967 on the album Francis A. & Edward K.
- Joseph C. Smith's Orchestra (recorded January 19, 1917, released by Victor Records as catalog number 18246A, with the flip side "Allah's Holiday")
- Willie "The Lion" Smith (recorded December 1950, released by Commodore Records as catalog number 654, with the flip side "Smoke Gets in Your Eyes")
- Dodie Stevens (released in 1959 by Dot Records as catalog number 15975 in the United States, and by London Records as catalog number HL-1560 in Australia, with the flip side "Miss Lonely Hearts"
- Pat Suzuki on her album "The Many Sides of Pat Suzuki", released 1957.*Victor Sylvester and his orchestra (released by Decca Records as catalog number 1070, with the flip side "Vienna, City of My Dreams")
- Art Tatum (recorded 1945, released by ARA Records as catalog number 4502, with the flip side "Lover")
- Bobby True Trio (recorded June 1947, released by Mercury Records as catalog number 5073, with the flip side "Why Should I Cry Over You?")
- Sarah Vaughan released by Mercury Records in the United States as catalog number 71085 and in Australia as catalog number 45169, both with the flip side "April Give Me One More Day", becoming a signature tune for her
- Paul Weston Orchestra (released by Capitol Records as catalog number 54-520, also released by Capitol Records as catalog number 10130, both with the flip side "Time on My Hands")
- Paul Whiteman and his orchestra (recorded February 7, 1928, released by Victor Records as catalog number 24078, with the flip side "San")
- Florence Wright (recorded February 11, 1950, released by National Records as catalog number 9105, with the flip side "Imagination")
