= Portfolio of Ahmad Jamal =

Live album by Ahmad Jamal
- Released: 1959
- Recorded: September 5–6, 1958; The Spotlight Club, DC
- Genre: Jazz
- Label: Argo; LPS-638

Ahmad Jamal chronology
Ahmad Jamal Trio Volume IV (1958)	Portfolio of Ahmad Jamal (1959)	Jamal at the Penthouse (1959)

Professional ratings
Review scores
Source	Rating
Allmusic	2/5 stars

Portfolio of Ahmad Jamal is a live album by American jazz pianist Ahmad Jamal featuring performances recorded live on location at the Spotlite Club in Washington, DC on September 5–6, 1958 and released on Argo in 1959. It includes additional selections from the engagement where Ahmad Jamal Trio Volume IV was recorded, and the complete recordings from these shows were released on 2007's Complete Live at the Spotlight Club 1958 on the Gambit label. The original release was a 2-LP set. Pianist Keith Jarrett has said this album changed his life.

== Reception ==
AllMusic rates the album 3 out of 5 stars.

== Track listing ==
All compositions by Ahmad Jamal except as indicated

1. "This Can't Be Love" (Lorenz Hart, Richard Rodgers)
2. "Autumn Leaves" (Joseph Kosma, Johnny Mercer, Jacques Prévert)
3. "Ahmad's Blues"
4. "Old Devil Moon" (E.Y. "Yip" Harburg, Burton Lane)
5. "Serelitus"
6. "It Could Happen to You" (Johnny Burke, James Van Heusen)
7. "Ivy" (Hoagy Carmichael)
8. "Tater Pie" (Irving Ashby)
9. "Let's Fall in Love" (Harold Arlen, Ted Koehler)
10. "Aki and Ukthay (Brother & Sister)"
11. "You Don't Know What Love Is" (Gene DePaul, Don Raye)
12. "I Didn't Know What Time It Was" (Lorenz Hart, Richard Rodgers)
13. "So Beats My Heart for You" (Pat Ballard, Charles Henderson, Tom Waring)
14. "Gal in Calico" (Leo Robin, Arthur Schwartz)
15. "Our Delight" (Tadd Dameron)

== Personnel ==
- Ahmad Jamal – piano
- Israel Crosby – double bass
- Vernel Fournier – drums
