= Heat Wave (Ahmad Jamal album) =

Studio album by Ahmad Jamal
- Released: 1966
- Recorded: August 1966
- Studio: Edgewood Recording Studios, Washington D.C.
- Genre: Jazz
- Length: 34:04
- Label: Cadet; LPS-777
- Producer: Ahmad Jamal and Dick La Palma

Ahmad Jamal chronology
Rhapsody (1965)	Heat Wave (1966)	Standard Eyes (1967)

Professional ratings
Review scores
Source	Rating
Allmusic	3/5 stars

Heat Wave is an album by American jazz pianist Ahmad Jamal featuring performances recorded in 1966 and released on the Cadet label.

== Track listing ==
1. "Heat Wave" (Irving Berlin) – 3:35
2. "April in Paris" (Vernon Duke, E. Y. Harburg) – 3:23
3. "Allison" (Hale Smith) – 2:52
4. "Gloria" (Leon René) – 2:53
5. "St. Thomas" (Sonny Rollins) – 4:21
6. "Misty" (Erroll Garner, Johnny Burke) – 2:49
7. "Maybe September" (Ray Evans, Percy Faith, Jay Livingston) – 3:00
8. "The Fantastic Vehicle" (Joe Kennedy) – 4:15
9. "The Girl Next Door" (Ralph Blane, Hugh Martin) – 6:56

== Personnel ==
- Ahmad Jamal – piano
- Jamil Nasser – bass
- Frank Gant – drums
