= Ahmad Jamal Trio Volume IV =

Ahmad Jamal Trio: Volume IV

Live album by Ahmad Jamal
- Released: 1958
- Recorded: September 6, 1958; The Spotlight Club, DC
- Genre: Jazz
- Label: Argo Records; Argo LP-636
- Producer: Dave Usher

Ahmad Jamal chronology
At the Pershing: But Not for Me (1958)	Ahmad Jamal Trio: Volume IV (1958)	Portfolio of Ahmad Jamal (1958)

Professional ratings
Review scores
Source	Rating
AllMusic	4.5/5 stars

The Ahmad Jamal Trio: Volume IV is a 1958 jazz album by pianist Ahmad Jamal. The album was recorded live on location at the Spotlight Club in Washington, DC, on September 6, 1958. The LP was released as Argo Records LP-636. This was Jamal's first recording following his surprise hit record, At the Pershing: But Not for Me.

== Critical reception ==
Scott Yanow of AllMusic notes that Volume IV "gives one a fairly definitive sampling of the unusual sound of the group, which could play with great passion while lowering the volume." Yanow commends the versions of "Taboo," "The Girl Next Door," "Cheek to Cheek," and "Secret Love" recorded on the album.

== Track listing ==
1. "Taboo" (M. Lecuona) (3:55)
2. "Should I" (Herb Brown, Arthur Freed) (3:31)
3. "Stompin' at the Savoy" (Sampson, Webb, Goodman, Razaf, Robbins) (4:15)
4. "The Girl Next Door" (Martin & Blaine, Leo Feist) (3:22)
5. "I Wish I Knew" (Gordon, Warren) (3:27)
6. "Cheek to Cheek" (Irving Berlin) (4:46)
7. "Autumn in New York" (Vernon Duke) (3:11)
8. "Secret Love" (S. Fein, P. Webster) (3:40)
9. "Squatty Roo" (Johnny Hodges) (2:14)
10. "That's All" (Brandt, Haymes) (2:29)

== Personnel ==
- Ahmad Jamal – piano
- Israel Crosby – double bass
- Vernel Fournier – drums

== Production ==
- Malcomn Chisholm – recording engineer
- Don Bronstein – photo and cover design
- Dave Usher – producer

== Release history ==
- Ahmad Jamal (LP, Album) London Records, UK 1959
- Volume IV (LP, Album) Argo Records, US 1958
- Ahmad Jamal (LP, Album, Mono), Quality, Canada
- Ahmad Jamal (LP, Album) Chess, Australia
- "Ahmad Jamal" Volume 4 (LP), Philips, Australia 1959
