= The Awakening (Ahmad Jamal album) =

Studio album by Ahmad Jamal
- Released: 1970
- Recorded: February 2–3, 1970
- Genre: Cool jazz, post-bop
- Length: 40:34
- Label: Impulse!
- Producer: Ed Michel

Ahmad Jamal chronology
Ahmad Jamal at the Top: Poinciana Revisited (1968)	The Awakening (1970)	Freeflight (1971)

The Awakening is an album by American jazz pianist Ahmad Jamal featuring trio performances with bassist Jamil Nasser and drummer Frank Gant recorded in 1970 for the Impulse! label.

== Background ==
The album was recorded at Plaza Sound Studios in New York City on February 2 and 3, 1970. It was produced by Ed Michel, whose production credits also include blues and jazz artists such as John Lee Hooker, B.B. King, John Coltrane, and Alice Coltrane.

The repertoire for the album consists of two originals—the title track and "Patterns"—and a new composition by Emil Boyd and Hale Smith titled "I Love Music", along with covers of three then fairly recent modern jazz compositions, Herbie Hancock's "Dolphin Dance" (1965), Oliver Nelson's "Stolen Moments" (1961), and Antonio Carlos Jobim's "Wave" (1967), as well as the 1931 Harry Warren standard "You're My Everything".

The liner notes are by jazz historian and producer Leonard Feather, who writes, "Jamal is one of the most pianistic of pianists. He plays a nine foot Steinway grand in this album, and extracts from it sounds that reflect not only the majesty of the instrument but his love for it and the perennial dedication to it that has marked his distinguished career." Feather also notes that on the title track, Jamal "plays one series of upward runs here that will leave most pianists gasping in disbelief—mixed, no doubt, with envy."

== Critical reception ==
Professional ratings
Review scores
Source	Rating
AllMusic	4/5 stars
The Penguin Guide to Jazz Recordings	3.5/4 stars
Pitchfork	8.0/10
The Rolling Stone Jazz Record Guide	3/5 stars

The AllMusic review by Scott Yanow stated, "By 1970, pianist Ahmad Jamal's style had changed a bit since the 1950s, becoming denser and more adventurous while still retaining his musical identity. ... Intriguing performances showing that Ahmad Jamal was continuing to evolve."

Writing in Pitchfork, Michael J. Agovino says that the album "is a fine example of Jamal's stately—and understated—elegance punctuated with doodles of whimsy."

Drummer Brian Blade selected the title track of The Awakening for his 1970 playlist (the year he was born), writing in JazzTimes that "Jamal is an absolute master of space, groove, song structure, and interpretation. The balance of his brilliance is unparalleled, and at the fulcrum rests his total command of the instrument to execute whatever he might imagine and the sensitivity to know how that ability will best serve the journey."

Chuck Linatti, in an article for All About Jazz, writes that "some people consider The Awakening to be Jamal's second great album [after At the Pershing: But Not for Me]. Although Jamal habitually deconstructed well-known songs and reconstructed them in unexpected ways, he seemed to take that technique to a new level on The Awakening."

== Legacy ==
Retrospectively, the album has had an influence in Hip hop music culture and production, with artists such as Nas and Common sampling tracks from the album for their work.

== Track listing ==
1. "The Awakening" (Ahmad Jamal) – 6:19
2. "I Love Music" (Emil Boyd, Hale Smith) – 7:19
3. "Patterns" (Ahmad Jamal) – 6:19
4. "Dolphin Dance" (Herbie Hancock) – 5:05
5. "You're My Everything" (Harry Warren, Joe Young, Mort Dixon) – 4:40
6. "Stolen Moments" (Oliver Nelson) – 6:27
7. "Wave" (Antônio Carlos Jobim) – 4:25

== Personnel ==
- Ahmad Jamal – piano
- Jamil Nasser – bass
- Frank Gant – drums

== Charts ==
2023 chart performance for The Awakening
Chart (2023)	Peak position
Belgian Albums (Ultratop Flanders)	187
German Albums (Offizielle Top 100)	42
