= Macanudo =

Macanudo is a Hispanic word. It may refer to:

- Macanudo (album), an album by American jazz pianist Ahmad Jamal
- Macanudo (cigar), a brand of a cigar produced by the General Cigar Company in the Dominican Republic
- Macanudo (comic), an Argentine daily comic strip by the cartoonist Liniers
