= Cry Young =

1967 studio album by Ahmad Jamal

Studio album by Ahmad Jamal
- Released: 1967
- Recorded: June 12–13, 1967
- Studio: Fine Recording Studios, New York
- Genre: Jazz
- Length: 33:09
- Label: Cadet; LPS-792
- Producer: Dick LaPalm

Ahmad Jamal chronology
| Standard Eyes (1967) | Cry Young (1967) | The Bright, the Blue and the Beautiful (1968) |

Professional ratings
Review scores
| Source | Rating |
|---|---|
| AllMusic | 3/5 stars |

Cry Young is an album by American jazz pianist Ahmad Jamal featuring performances recorded in 1967 and released on the Cadet label.

== Critical reception ==
AllMusic awarded the album 3 stars, calling it a "Fine, enjoyable date from his peak period of popularity".

== Track listing ==
1. "A Beautiful Friendship" (Sammy Cahn, Jule Styne) – 3:07
2. "Where Is Love?" (Lionel Bart) – 2:34
3. "Little Ditty" (Ahmad Jamal) – 2:23
4. "Who Needs Manhattan" (Bob Williams) – 3:54
5. "Minor Moods" (Jamal, Jamil Nasser) – 2:21
6. "Cry Young" (Williams) – 3:43
7. "Nature Boy" (eden ahbez) – 3:15
8. "There Are Such Things" (Stanley Adams, Abel Baer, George W. Meyer) – 3:24
9. "Call Me Irresponsible" (Jimmy Van Heusen, Sammy Cahn) – 2:53
10. "Tropical Breeze" (Nasser) – 3:00
11. "C'est si Bon" (Henri Betti) – 2:35

== Personnel ==
- Ahmad Jamal – piano, arranger
- Jamil Nasser – bass
- Frank Gant – drums
- The Howard Roberts Choir – vocals
- Hale Smith – conductor
