= Count 'Em 88 =

1956 studio album by Ahmad Jamal

Studio album by Ahmad Jamal
- Released: 1956
- Recorded: September 17 and October 4, 1956
- Studio: Universal, Chicago
- Genre: Jazz
- Length: 34:40
- Label: Argo LP-610
- Producer: Phil Chess

Ahmad Jamal chronology
The Ahmad Jamal Trio (1956)	Count 'Em 88 (1956)	Ahmad's Blues (1958)

Count 'Em 88 is an album by American jazz pianist Ahmad Jamal. It contains performances recorded in 1956 and released on the Argo label.

== Critical reception ==
Professional ratings
Review scores
Source	Rating
AllMusic	4/5 stars

Scott Yanow of AllMusic states: "The 'Jamal sound,' with its expert use of dynamics, close interplay, space and subtle surprises was very much in place, and this out-of-print set is on the same level as his better-known hits to come."

== Track listing ==
All compositions by Ahmad Jamal unless noted.

1. "Volga Boatmen" (Traditional) – 3:49
2. "On Green Dolphin Street" (Bronisław Kaper, Ned Washington) – 3:18
3. "How About You?" (Burton Lane, Ralph Freed) – 5:26
4. "I Just Can't See for Looking" (Nadine Robinson, Dok Stanford) – 2:04
5. "Spring Will Be a Little Late This Year" (Frank Loesser) – 2:34
6. "Beat Out One" – 5:24
7. "Maryam" – 3:36
8. "It's Easy to Remember" (Lorenz Hart, Richard Rodgers) – 5:35
9. "Jim Love Sue" – 2:54

== Personnel ==
- Ahmad Jamal – piano
- Israel Crosby – bass
- Walter Perkins – drums
