= I'm Jimmy Reed =

Studio album by Jimmy Reed
- Released: 1958
- Recorded: June 6 and December 29/30, 1953, December 5, 1955, June 11 and October 3, 1956, January 9, April 3 & December 12, 1957, and March 12, 1958
- Studio: Chicago, IL
- Genre: Blues
- Length: 32:25
- Label: Vee-Jay; VJLP 1004

Jimmy Reed chronology
I'm Jimmy Reed (1958)	Rockin' with Reed (1959)

I'm Jimmy Reed is an album by blues musician Jimmy Reed, compiling twelve tracks originally issued as singles between 1953 and 1958, that was released by the Vee-Jay label.

== Reception ==
Professional ratings
Review scores
Source	Rating
AllMusic	4.5/5 stars
The Encyclopedia of Popular Music	4/5 stars
The Penguin Guide to Blues Recordings	3/4 stars
The Rolling Stone Album Guide	3/5 stars

AllMusic reviewer Bruce Eder stated: "I'm Jimmy Reed, was about as strong a first album as was heard in Chicago blues ... As was the case with most bluesmen of his generation, Reed's debut LP was really a collection of single sides than an actual album of new material (though some of it did hail from its year of release), consisting of tracks he'd recorded from June 1953 through March 1958 ... But that also turns I'm Jimmy Reed into a treasure-trove of prime material from his repertory, including the songs on which he'd built his reputation over the previous five years ... which help give this album more depth and breadth than a formal hits collection would have had".

== Track listing ==
All compositions credited to Jimmy Reed

1. "Honest I Do" – 2:40
2. "Go on to School" – 2:47
3. "My First Plea" – 2:45
4. "Boogie in the Dark" – 2:34
5. "You Got Me Crying" – 2:35
6. "Ain't That Lovin' You Baby" – 2:14
7. "You Got Me Dizzy" – 2:53
8. "Little Rain" – 2:45
9. "Can't Stand to See You Go" – 2:50
10. "Roll and Rhumba" – 2:46
11. "You're Something Else" – 2:35
12. "You Don't Have to Go" – 3:04
- Recorded in Chicago on June 6, 1953 (track 10), December 29/30, 1953 (tracks 4 & 12), December 5, 1955 (tracks 6 & 9), June 11, 1956 (track 3), October 3, 1956 (track 7), January 9, 1957 (track 8), April 3, 1957 (track 1), December 12, 1957 (track 11), March 12, 1958 (tracks 2 & 5)

== Personnel ==
- Jimmy Reed – guitar, vocals, harmonica
- Remo Biondi (tracks 2, 5 & 11), John Brim (track 10), Eddie Taylor (tracks 1–9, 11 & 12) – guitar
- Vernel Fournier (tracks 6 & 9), Albert King (tracks 4, 10 & 12), Earl Phillips (tracks 1–3, 5, 7, 8 & 11) – drums
