= Ahmad Jamal =

American jazz pianist (1930–2023)

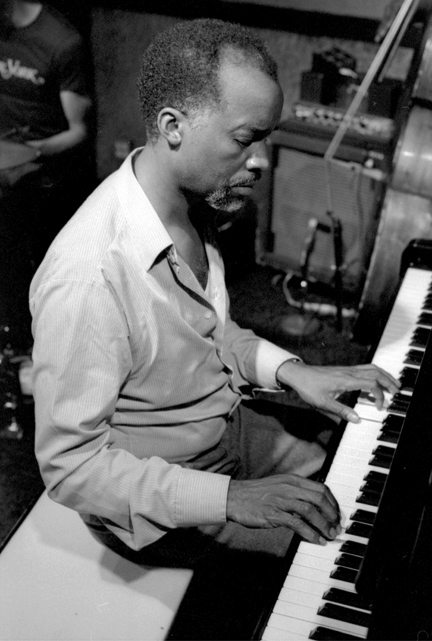
- Jamal at Keystone Korner in San Francisco, 1980

Background information
- Born: Frederick Russell Jones; July 2, 1930; Pittsburgh, Pennsylvania, U.S.
- Died: April 16, 2023 (aged 92) Ashley Falls, Massachusetts, U.S.
- Genres: Jazz; hard bop; modal jazz; cool jazz; post-bop
- Occupation: Musician
- Instrument: Piano
- Years active: 1948–2020
- Labels: OKeh; Parrot; Epic; Argo; Atlantic; Dreyfus; Impulse!; Telarc; Jazzbook/ACM
- Website: www.ahmadjamal.com

Ahmad Jamal (born Frederick Russell Jones; July 2, 1930 – April 16, 2023) was an American jazz pianist, composer, bandleader, and educator. For six decades, he was one of the most successful small-group leaders in jazz. He was a National Endowment for the Arts (NEA) Jazz Master and won a Lifetime Achievement Grammy for his contributions to music history.

== Biography ==
=== Early life ===
Jamal was born Frederick Russell Jones in Pittsburgh, Pennsylvania, on July 2, 1930. He began playing piano at the age of three, when his uncle Lawrence challenged him to duplicate what he was playing. Jamal began formal piano training at the age of seven with Mary Cardwell Dawson, whom he said greatly influenced him. Although Jamal is famous for his restrained playing style, he possessed an enormous piano technique from an early age and was playing Liszt etudes in competition as young as 11 years old. His Pittsburgh roots remained an important part of his identity ("Pittsburgh meant everything to me and it still does," he said in 2001), and it was there that he was immersed in the influence of jazz artists such as Earl Hines, Billy Strayhorn, Mary Lou Williams, and Erroll Garner. Jamal studied with pianist James Miller and began playing piano professionally at the age of fourteen, at which point he was recognized as a "coming great" by the pianist Art Tatum. When asked about his practice habits by a critic from The New York Times, Jamal commented that, "I used to practice and practice with the door open, hoping someone would come by and discover me. I was never the practitioner in the sense of twelve hours a day, but I always thought about music. I think about music all the time."

=== Beginnings ===
External media

Audio
- Ahmad Jamal On Piano Jazz, August 29, 2008, Piano Jazz
- Eric in The Evening; Ahmad Jamal, interview, January 18, 1989, Open Vault at WGBH

Video
- Ahmad Jamal – Interview – "American Classical Music", April 27, 2010, underyourskindvd

Jamal began touring with George Hudson's Orchestra after graduating from George Westinghouse High School in 1948. He then joined touring group The Four Strings, that disbanded when violinist Joe Kennedy Jr. left. In 1950 he moved to Chicago, performing intermittently with local musicians Von Freeman and Claude McLin, and solo at the Palm Tavern, occasionally joined by drummer Ike Day.

Born to Baptist parents, Jamal became interested in Islam and Islamic culture in Detroit, where there was a sizeable Muslim community, in the 1940s and 1950s. He converted to Islam and changed his name to Ahmad Jamal in 1950. In an interview with The New York Times a few years later, he said his decision to change his name stemmed from a desire to "re-establish my original name." Shortly after his conversion to Islam, he explained to The New York Times that he "says Muslim prayers five times a day and arises in time to say his first prayers at 5 am. He says them in Arabic in keeping with the Muslim tradition."

Jamal made his first records in 1951 for the Okeh label with The Three Strings (which would later also be called the Ahmad Jamal Trio, although Jamal himself avoided using the term "trio"): the other members were guitarist Ray Crawford and a bassist, at different times Eddie Calhoun (1950–52), Richard Davis (1953–54), and Israel Crosby (1954–62). The Three Strings arranged an extended engagement at Chicago's Blue Note, but leapt to fame after performing at the Embers in New York City where John Hammond saw the band play and signed them to Okeh Records. Hammond, a record producer who discovered the talents and enhanced the fame of musicians like Benny Goodman, Billie Holiday, and Count Basie, helped Jamal's trio attract critical acclaim. Jamal subsequently recorded for Parrot (1953–55) and Epic (1955) using the piano-guitar-bass lineup. He recorded his first album with a drummer, Walter Perkins, in 1956: Count 'Em 88, which includes the influential revival of the song "On Green Dolphin Street".

=== At the Pershing: But Not for Me ===
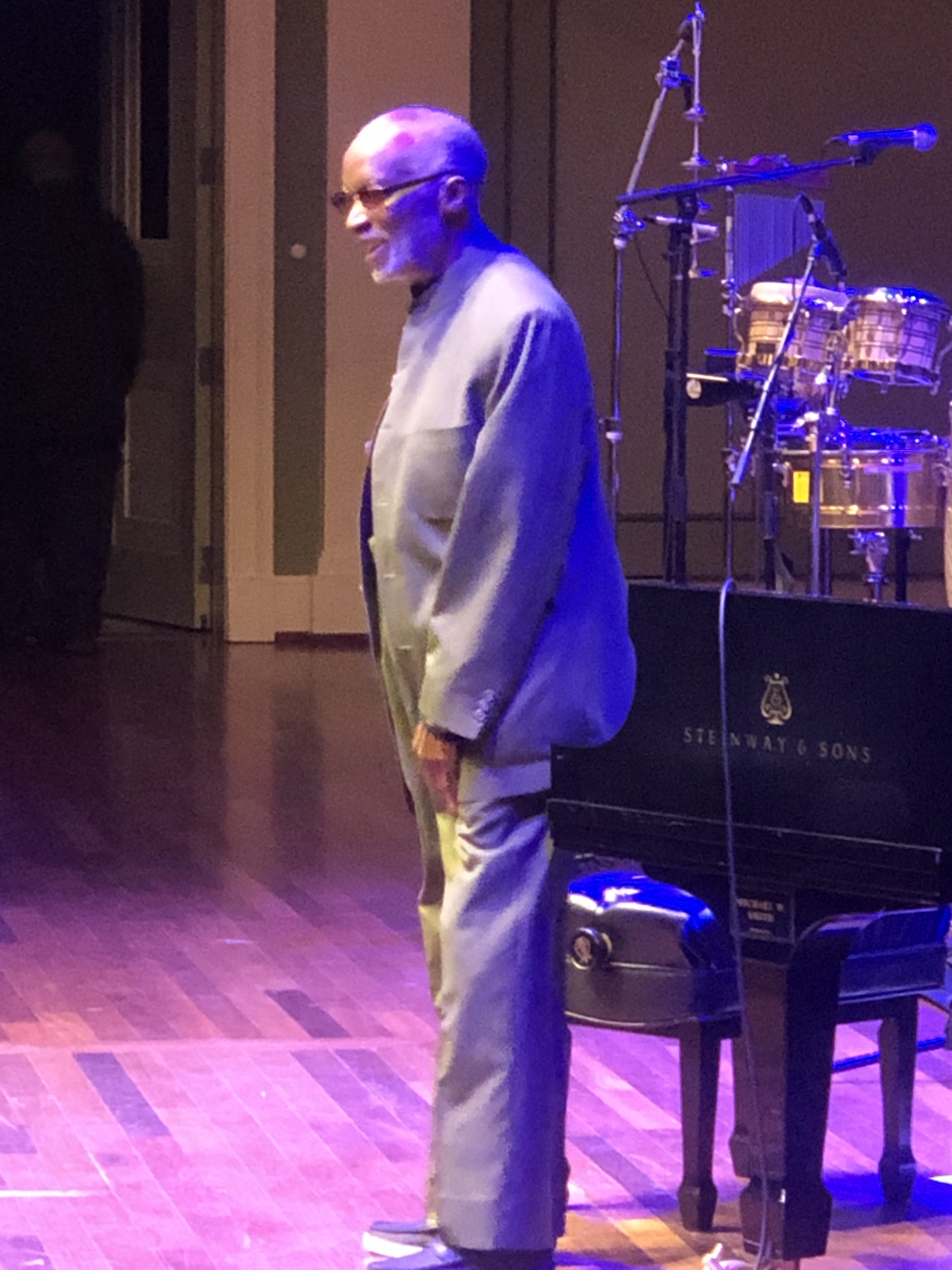
Jamal in Nashville, October 18, 2019

The trio's sound changed significantly when Crawford was replaced with a drummer, and Vernel Fournier assumed this position in 1957. The group worked as the "house trio" at Chicago's Pershing Hotel. The trio released the live album At the Pershing: But Not for Me, which stayed on the Ten Best-selling charts for 108 weeks. Jamal's well-known live recording of the Nat Simon song "Poinciana", which Jamal had first recorded on The Piano Scene of Ahmad Jamal, was released on this album.

Perhaps Jamal's most famous recording, At the Pershing: But Not for Me, was recorded at the Pershing Hotel in Chicago in 1958; it brought him an unusual level of popularity for a jazz pianist in the late 1950s and the early 1960s. The set list included various jazz standards, such as "The Surrey with the Fringe on Top" from the Richard Rodgers musical Oklahoma! and Karl Suessdorf's "Moonlight in Vermont". Jamal's trio, especially through its influence on Miles Davis, would come to be recognized as a seminal force in the history of jazz. Particularly evident were Jamal's unusually minimalist and restrained style and his extended use of vamps, according to reviewer John Morthland. The New York Times contributor Ben Ratliff said, in a review of the album, "If you're looking for an argument that pleasurable mainstream art can assume radical status at the same time, Jamal is your guide."

He attracted media coverage for his investment decisions pertaining to his "rising fortune". In 1959, he took a tour of North Africa to explore investment options. Jamal, who was 29 at the time, said he was curious about the homeland of his ancestors, highly influenced by his conversion to the Muslim faith. He also said his religion had brought him peace of mind about his race, which accounted for his "growth in the field of music that has proved very lucrative for me." Upon his return to the U.S. after a tour of North Africa, the financial success of Live at the Pershing: But Not For Me allowed Jamal to open a restaurant and club called The Alhambra in Chicago, which lasted barely one year.

In 1962, the classic Jamal/Crosby/Fournier trio made its final recording, Ahmad Jamal at the Blackhawk. Although Crosby and Fournier had started to play with George Shearing, the definitive end of the trio came with Crosby's death from a heart attack in August 1962. Jamal recorded Macanudo with a full orchestra in late 1962. He then took a brief hiatus from performing and recording.

=== Return to music and The Awakening ===
In 1964, Jamal resumed performing after moving to New York and started a residency at the Village Gate nightclub. That year, he began recording a series of new trio albums with bassist Jamil S. Nasser, starting with Naked City Theme. Jamal and Nasser continued to play together until 1972. He also joined forces with Fournier (again, 1965–1966) and drummer Frank Gant (1966–77), among others. Until 1970, he played only acoustic piano. The final album on which, for a time, he played exclusively acoustic piano in the regular sequence was The Awakening. In the 1970s, he played electric piano as well, as on the instrumental recording of "Suicide is Painless," theme song from the 1970 film M*A*S*H, which was released on a 1973 reissue of the film's soundtrack album, replacing the original vocal version of the song by The Mash. Apparently, the Rhodes piano he used was a gift from someone in Switzerland. He continued to play and record throughout the 1970s and 1980s, mostly in trios with piano, bass and drums, and occasionally expanded the group to include a guitarist or a percussionist. One of his most long-standing gigs was as the band for the New Year's Eve celebrations at Blues Alley in Washington, D.C., from 1979 through the 1990s. Jamal also reimagined his hit song "Poinciana" several times, notably on Ahmad Jamal at the Top: Poinciana Revisited (1968) and Digital Works (1985).

In 1986, Jamal sued critic Leonard Feather for using his former name in a publication.

=== Later career ===
In his 80s, Jamal continued to make numerous tours and recordings, including albums such as Saturday Morning (2013), the CD/DVD release Ahmad Jamal Featuring Yusef Lateef Live at L'Olympia (2014), Marseille (2017), and Ballades (2019), featuring mostly solo piano. Jamal was the main mentor of jazz piano virtuosos Hiromi Uehara, known as Hiromi, and Shahin Novrasli.

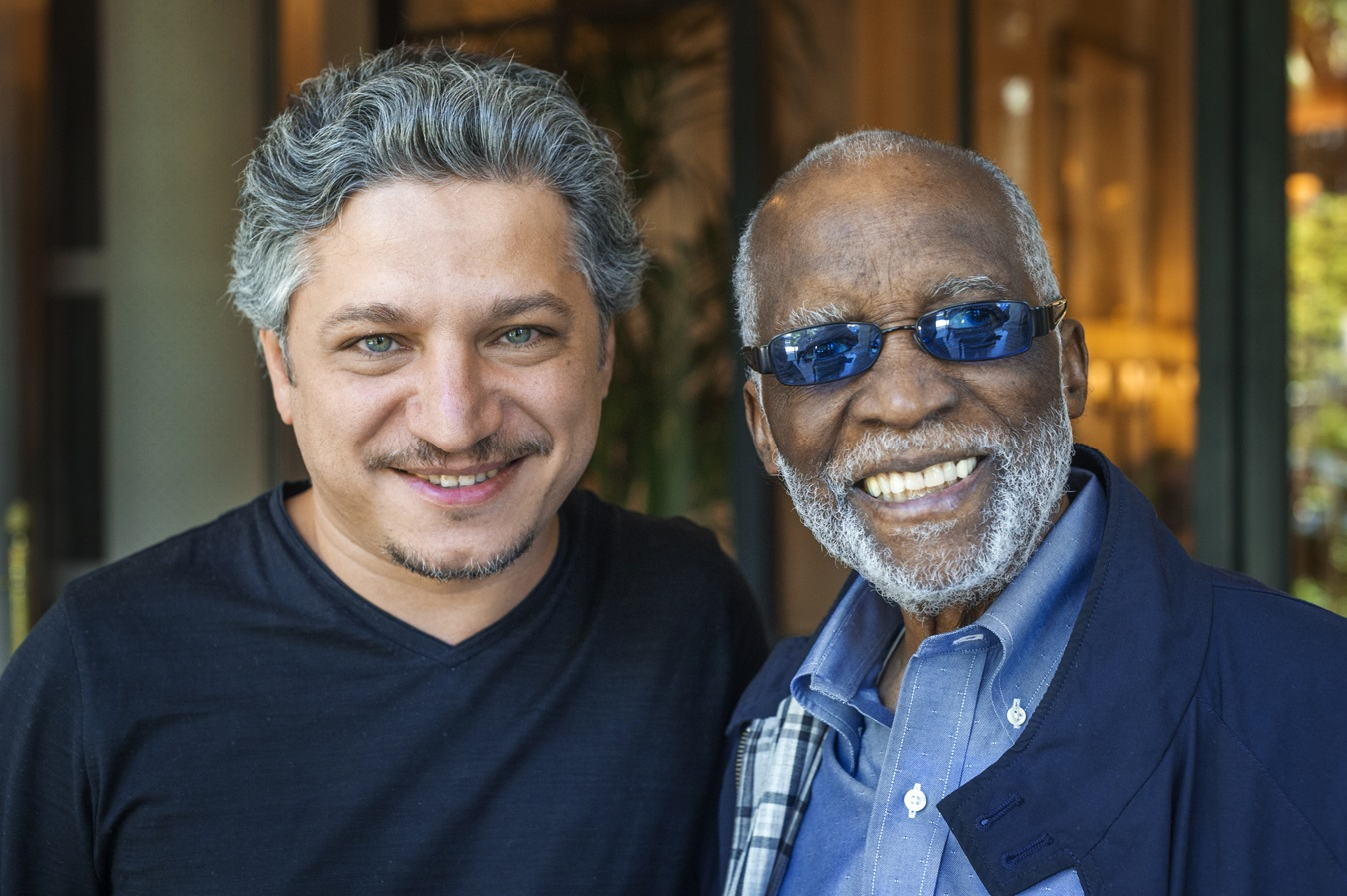
Jamal and Shahin Novrasli

== Personal life and death ==
Jamal was married and divorced three times. As a teenager, he married Virginia 'Maryam' Wilkins; they had one daughter, who pre-deceased him. In the early 1960s, he married Sharifah Frazier, with whom he had one daughter; they divorced in 1982. That year, he married his manager, Laura Hess-Hay. They divorced two years later but she represented him for the rest of his life.

On April 16, 2023, Jamal died from complications of prostate cancer at home in Ashley Falls, Massachusetts. He was 92.

== Style and influence ==
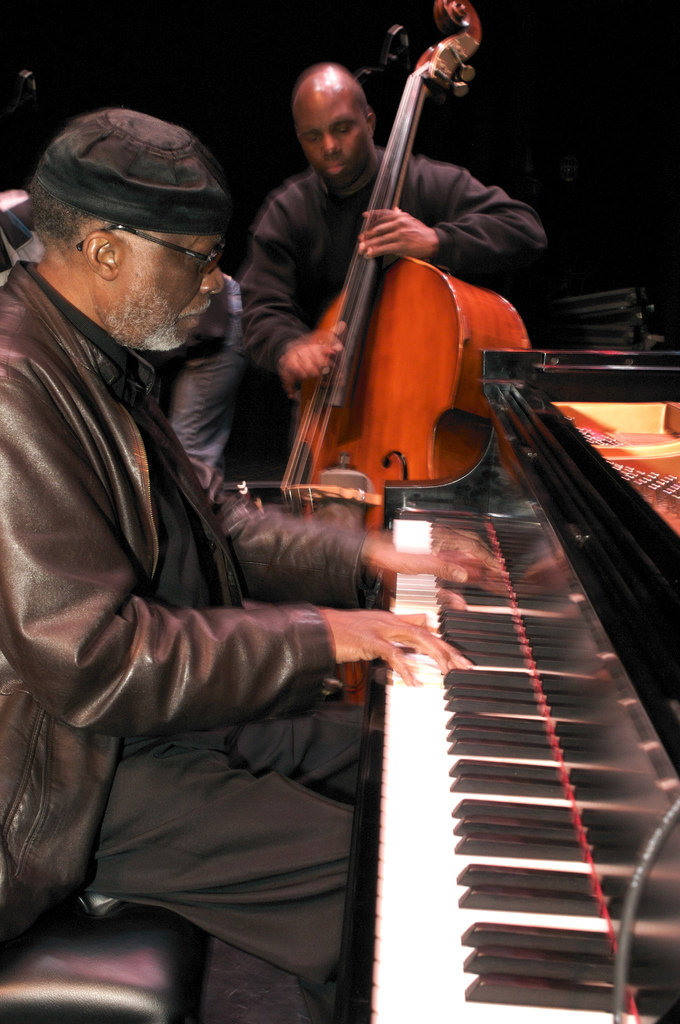
Jamal performing with bassist James Cammack in 2007

"Ahmad Jamal is one of the great Zen masters of jazz piano. He plays just what is needed and nothing more... every phrase is perfect."

— Tom Moon, NPR musical correspondent

Trained in both traditional jazz ("American classical music", as he preferred to call it) and European classical style, Jamal was praised as one of the greatest jazz innovators over the course of his exceptionally long career. Following bebop greats like Charlie Parker and Dizzy Gillespie, Jamal entered the world of jazz at a time when speed and virtuosic improvisation were central to the success of jazz musicians as artists. Jamal, however, took steps in the direction of a new movement, later coined "cool jazz"—an effort to move jazz in the direction of classical music. He emphasized space between notes in his musical compositions and interpretations instead of focusing on the fast-paced bebop style.

Because of this style, Jamal was "often dismissed by jazz writers as no more than a cocktail pianist, a player so given to fluff that his work shouldn't be considered seriously in any artistic sense". Stanley Crouch, author of Considering Genius, offered a very different reaction to Jamal's music, claiming that, like the highly influential Thelonious Monk, Jamal was a true innovator of the jazz tradition and is second in importance in the development of jazz after 1945 only to Charlie Parker. His unique musical style stemmed from many individual characteristics, including his use of orchestral effects and his ability to control the beat of songs. These stylistic choices resulted in a unique and new sound for the piano trio: "Through the use of space and changes of rhythm and tempo", wrote Crouch, "Jamal invented a group sound that had all the surprise and dynamic variation of an imaginatively ordered big band." Jamal explored the texture of riffs, timbres, and phrases rather than the quantity or speed of notes in any given improvisation. Speaking about Jamal, A. B. Spellman of the National Endowment of the Arts said: "Nobody except Thelonious Monk used space better, and nobody ever applied the artistic device of tension and release better." These (at the time) unconventional techniques that Jamal gleaned from both traditional classical and contemporary jazz musicians helped pave the way for later jazz greats like Bill Evans, Cedar Walton, McCoy Tyner, Herbie Hancock, Monty Alexander, Fred Hersch, Bill Charlap, Vijay Iyer, and Ethan Iverson.

Music critic Ben Waltzer argued that Jamal's most significant innovation was his reconception of the piano trio as an orchestrated ensemble rather than a piano accompanied by a rhythm section. Drawing on what Jamal described as "big-band concepts", he incorporated recurring riffs, vamps, and ostinatos into the improvisational structure itself and elevated the bass and drums from supporting roles to equal participants in the musical conversation. Waltzer wrote that by blurring the distinction between foreground and background voices within the trio, Jamal created a flexible, multilayered ensemble sound that influenced subsequent generations of jazz musicians.

Though Jamal is often overlooked by jazz critics and historians, he is frequently credited with having a great influence on Miles Davis. Davis is quoted as saying that he was impressed by Jamal's rhythmic sense and his "concept of space, his lightness of touch, his understatement". Miles used to send his crew to concerts of Jamal, so they could learn to play like Miles wanted it. Jamal's contrasts (crafting melodies that included strong and mild tones, and fast and slow rhythms) were what impressed Miles. Jamal characterized what he thought Davis admired about his music as: "my discipline as opposed to my space." Jamal and Davis became friends in the 1950s, and Davis continued to support Jamal as a fellow musician, often playing versions of Jamal's own songs ("Ahmad's Blues", "New Rhumba") until he died in 1991. In addition, in a 1960 interview, Bill Evans said of Jamal, "I enjoy listening to him very much." Evans emphatically rejected the "cocktail pianist" criticism of Jamal, stating, "It's a real thing he's doing."

Jamal, speaking about his own work, said, "I like doing ballads. They're hard to play. It takes years of living, really, to read them properly." From an early age, Jamal developed an appreciation for the lyrics of the songs he learned: "I once heard Ben Webster playing his heart out on a ballad. All of a sudden he stopped. I asked him, 'Why did you stop, Ben?' He said, 'I forgot the lyrics.'" Jamal attributed the variety in his musical taste to the fact that he grew up in several eras: the big band era, the bebop years, and the electronic age. He said his style evolved from drawing on the techniques and music produced in these three eras. In 1985, Jamal agreed to do an interview and recording session with his fellow jazz pianist, Marian McPartland on her NPR show Piano Jazz. Jamal, who said he rarely would play "But Not For Me" due to its popularity after his 1958 recording, played an improvised version of the tune – though only after noting that he moved on to making ninety percent of his repertoire his own compositions. He said that when he grew in popularity from the Live at the Pershing album, he was severely criticized afterwards for not playing any of his own compositions.

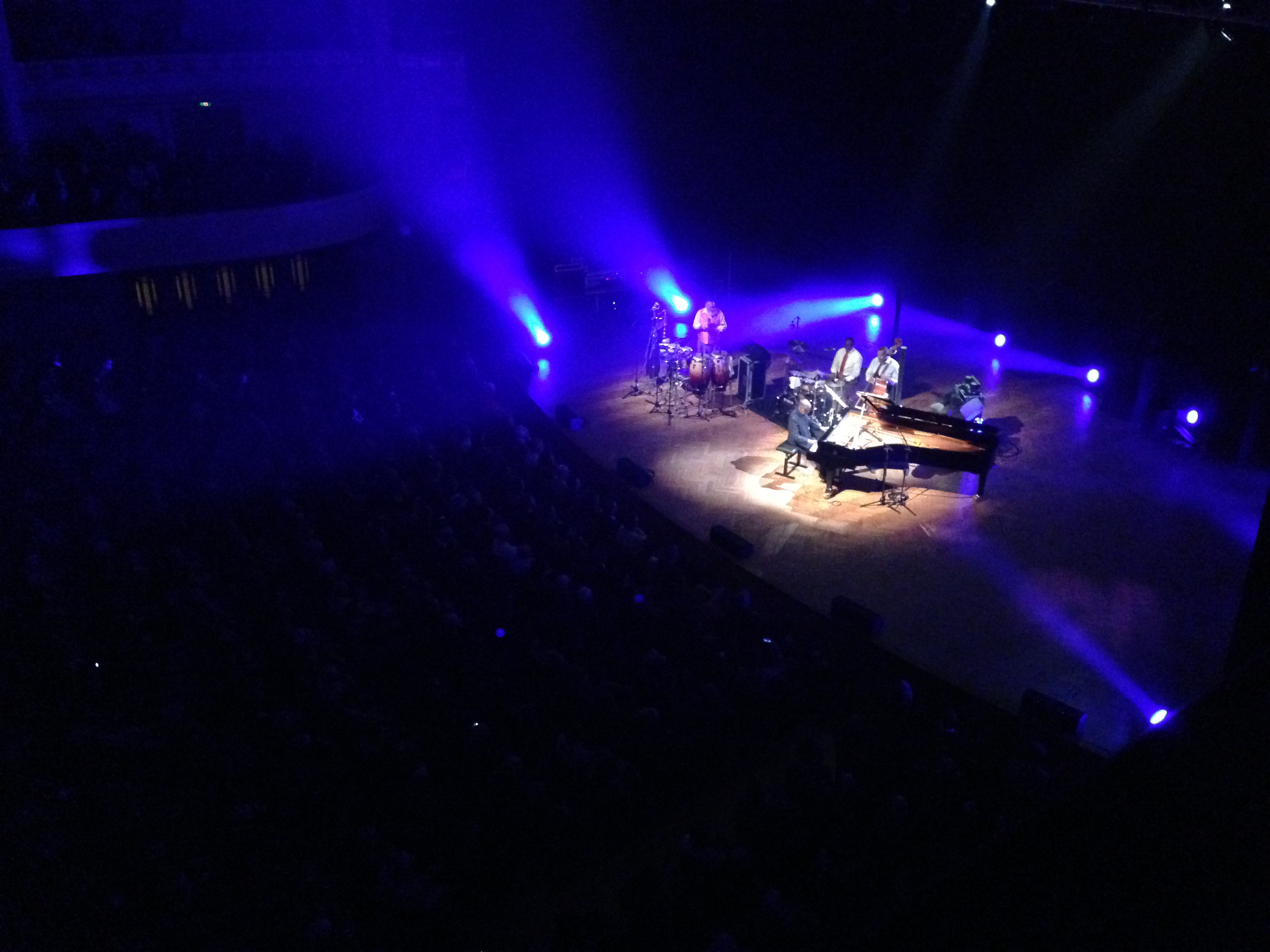
Jamal at Bozar in Brussels, Belgium (January 2014)

In his later years, Jamal embraced the electronic influences affecting the genre of jazz. He also occasionally expanded his usual small ensemble of three to include a tenor saxophone (George Coleman) and a violin. A jazz fan interviewed by Down Beat magazine about Jamal in 2010 described his development as "more aggressive and improvisational these days. The word I used to use is avant garde; that might not be right. Whatever you call it, the way he plays is the essence of what jazz is."

Saxophonist Ted Nash described his experience with Jamal's style in an interview with Down Beat magazine: "The way he comped wasn't the generic way that lots of pianists play with chords in the middle of the keyboard, just filling things up. He gave lots of single line responses. He'd come back and throw things out at you, directly from what you played. It was really interesting because it made you stop, and allowed him to respond, and then you felt like playing something else – that's something I don't feel with a lot of piano players. It's really quite engaging. I guess that's another reason people focus in on him. He makes them hone in."

Jamal recorded with the voices of the Howard A. Roberts Chorale on The Bright, the Blue and the Beautiful and Cry Young; with vibraphonist Gary Burton on In Concert; with brass, reeds, and strings celebrating his hometown of Pittsburgh; with The Assai Quartet; and with tenor saxophonist George Coleman on the album The Essence Part One.

== Awards and honors ==
- 1959: Entertainment Award, Pittsburgh Junior Chamber of Commerce Players
- 1980: Distinguished Service Award, City of Washington D.C., Anacostia Community Museum, Smithsonian Institution
- 1981: Nominee for Best R&B Instrumental Performance ("You're Welcome", "Stop on By"), 24th Annual Grammy Awards
- 1986: Mellon Jazz Festival Salutes Ahmad Jamal, Pittsburgh.
- 1987: Honorary Membership, Philippines Jazz Foundation
- 1994: American Jazz Masters award, National Endowment for the Arts
- 2001: Arts & Culture Recognition Award, National Coalition of 100 Black Women
- 2001: Kelly-Strayhorn Gallery of Stars, for Achievements as Pianist and Composer, East Liberty Quarter Chamber of Commerce
- 2003: Inductee, American Jazz Hall of Fame, New Jersey Jazz Society
- 2003: Gold Medallion, Steinway & Sons 150 Years Celebration (1853–2003)
- 2007: Living Jazz Legend, Kennedy Center for the Performing Arts
- 2007: Ordre des Arts et des Lettres, Government of France
- 2011: Down Beat Hall of Fame, 76th Readers Poll
- 2015: Honorary Doctorate of Music, The New England Conservatory
- 2017: Lifetime Achievement Award, 59th Annual Grammy Awards, The Recording Academy
- 2018: International Eddie Rosner Leopolis Jazz Music Award, Leopolis Jazz Fest, Lviv

== Discography ==
Year recorded	Title	Label	Notes	Ref.
1951–55	The Piano Scene of Ahmad Jamal	Epic	Trio, with Ray Crawford (guitar), Eddie Calhoun and Israel Crosby (bass; separately). Released in 1959.	
1955	Ahmad Jamal Plays	Parrot	Trio, with Ray Crawford (guitar), Israel Crosby (bass); also released as Chamber Music of the New Jazz by Argo	
1955	The Ahmad Jamal Trio	Epic	Trio, with Ray Crawford (guitar), Israel Crosby (bass)	
1956	Count 'Em 88	Argo	Trio, with Israel Crosby (bass), Walter Perkins (drums)	
1958	Ahmad's Blues	Chess/MCA	Trio, with Israel Crosby (bass), Vernel Fournier (drums); in concert	
1958	At the Pershing: But Not for Me (Ahmad Jamal at the Pershing, Vol. 1)	Argo	Trio, with Israel Crosby (bass), Vernel Fournier (drums); in concert	
1958	At the Pershing, Vol. 2	Argo	Trio, with Israel Crosby (bass), Vernel Fournier (drums); in concert	
1958	Ahmad Jamal Trio Volume IV	Argo	Trio, with Israel Crosby (bass), Vernel Fournier (drums); in concert	
1958	Portfolio of Ahmad Jamal	Argo	Trio, with Israel Crosby (bass), Vernel Fournier (drums); in concert	
1958	Poinciana	Argo	Trio, with Israel Crosby (bass), Vernel Fournier (drums)	
1959	Jamal at the Penthouse	Argo	With Israel Crosby (bass), Vernel Fournier (drums), orchestra; in concert	
1960	Happy Moods	Argo	Trio, with Israel Crosby (bass), Vernel Fournier (drums)	
1960	Listen to the Ahmad Jamal Quintet	Argo	Quintet, with Ray Crawford (guitar), Joe Kennedy (violin), Israel Crosby (bass), Vernel Fournier (drums)	
1961	All of You	Argo	Trio, with Israel Crosby (bass), Vernel Fournier (drums); in concert	
1961	Ahmad Jamal's Alhambra	Argo	Trio, with Israel Crosby (bass), Vernel Fournier (drums); in concert	
1962	Ahmad Jamal at the Blackhawk	Argo	Trio, with Israel Crosby (bass), Vernel Fournier (drums); in concert	
1962	Macanudo	Argo	With orchestra arranged and conducted by Richard Evans	
1964	Naked City Theme	Argo	Trio, with Jamil Nasser (bass), Chuck Lampkin (drums); in concert at the San Francisco Jazz Workshop	
1965	The Roar of the Greasepaint	Argo	Trio, with Jamil Nasser (bass), Chuck Lampkin (drums)	
1965	Extensions	Argo	Trio, with Jamil Nasser (bass), Vernel Fournier (drums)	
1965	Rhapsody	Cadet	With Jamil Nasser (bass), Vernel Fournier (drums), orchestra	
1966	Heat Wave	Cadet	Trio, with Jamil Nasser (bass), Frank Gant (drums)	
1967	Cry Young	Cadet	With Jamil Nasser (bass), Frank Gant (drums), choir	
1968	The Bright, the Blue and the Beautiful	Cadet	With Jamil Nasser (bass), Frank Gant (drums), choir	
1968	Tranquility	ABC	With Jamil Nasser (bass), Frank Gant (drums)	
1968	Ahmad Jamal at the Top: Poinciana Revisited	Impulse!	Trio, with Jamil Nasser (bass), Frank Gant (drums); in concert	
1970	The Awakening	Impulse!	Trio, with Jamil Nasser (bass), Frank Gant (drums)	
1971	Freeflight	Impulse!	Trio, with Jamil Nasser (bass), Frank Gant (drums); in concert at Montreux Jazz Festival	
1971	Outertimeinnerspace	Impulse!	Trio, with Jamil Nasser (bass), Frank Gant (drums); in concert at the Montreux Jazz Festival	
1973	Ahmad Jamal '73	20th Century	With orchestra, vocals	
1974	Jamalca	20th Century	With orchestra, six vocalists and Jamil Nassar and Richard Evans (bass), and Brian Grice and Frank Gant (drums)	
1974	Jamal Plays Jamal	20th Century	Quartet, with Jamil Nasser (bass), Frank Gant (drums), Azzedin Weston (congas)	
1975	Genetic Walk	20th Century	With Calvin Keys and Danny Leake (guitar; separately), Richard Evans, Roger Harris, John Heard and Jamil Nasser (bass; separately), Steve Cobb, Frank Gant, Morris Jenkins, Eddie Marshall and Harvey Mason (drums; separately)	
1976	Steppin' Out with a Dream	20th Century	Quartet, with Calvin Keys (guitar), John Heard (bass), Frank Gant (drums)	
1976	Recorded Live at Oil Can Harry's	Catalyst	Quintet, with Calvin Keys (guitar), John Heard (bass), Frank Gant (drums), Seldon Newton (percussion); in concert at Oil Can Harry's, Vancouver	
1978	One	20th Century	With members of The Wrecking Crew	
1980	Intervals	20th Century	Quintet, with Calvin Keys (guitar), John Heard (bass), Harvey Mason (drums), Seldon Newton (percussion)	
1980	Live at Bubba's	Who's Who in Jazz	Trio, with Sabu Adeyola (bass), Payton Crossley (drums); in concert at Bubba's Jazz Restaurant in Fort Lauderdale	
1980	Night Song	Motown	With Oscar Brashear and Robert O'Bryant (trumpet), Maurice Spears and Garnett Brown (trombone), Pete Christlieb (alto sax), Ernie Fields (baritone sax), Dean Paul Gant and Gil Askey (keyboards), Calvin Keys and Greg Purce (guitar), John Heard and Kenneth Burke (bass), Chester Thompson (drums)	
1981	In Concert	Personal Choice	Some tracks trio, with Sabu Adeyola (bass), Payton Crossley (drums); some tracks quartet, with Gary Burton (vibraphone) added; in concert at the Palais des Festivals et des Congrès in Cannes	
1982	American Classical Music	Shubra	Quartet, with David Adeyola (bass), Payton Crossley (drums), Selden Newton (percussion); in concert at San Francisco's Great American Music Hall; also released by Black Lion as Goodbye Mr. Evans	
1985	Digital Works	Atlantic	Quartet, with Larry Ball (bass), Herlin Riley (drums), Iraj Lashkary (percussion)	
1985	Live at the Montreal Jazz Festival 1985	Atlantic	Quartet, with James Cammack (bass), Herlin Riley (drums), Selden Newton (percussion)	
1986	Rossiter Road	Atlantic	Quartet, with James Cammack (bass), Herlin Riley (drums), Manolo Badrena (percussion)	
1987	Crystal	Atlantic	Quartet, with James Cammack (bass), David Bowler (drums), Willie White (percussion)	
1989	Pittsburgh	Atlantic	With James Cammack (bass), David Bowler (drums), orchestra	
1992	Live! At Blues Alley	Blues Alley Musical Society	Quartet, with James Cammack (bass), David Bowler (drums) and Seldon Newton (percussion)	
1992	Live in Paris 1992	Verve	Some tracks trio with James Cammack (bass), David Bowler (drums); some tracks trio with Todd Coolman (bass), Gordon Lane (drums); in concert	
1992	Chicago Revisited: Live at Joe Segal's Jazz Showcase	Telarc	Trio, with John Heard (bass), Yoron Israel (drums); in concert	
1994	I Remember Duke, Hoagy & Strayhorn	Telarc	Trio, with Ephraim Woolfolk (bass), Arti Dixson (drums)	
1994–95	The Essence Part One	Birdology	Most tracks quartet, with James Cammack (bass), Idris Muhammad (drums), Manolo Badrena (percussion); some tracks quintet, with George Coleman (tenor sax), Jamil Nasser (bass), Muhammad (drums), Badrena (percussion)	
1994–95	Big Byrd: The Essence Part 2	Birdology	Most tracks quartet, with James Cammack (bass), Idris Muhammad (drums), Manolo Badrena (percussion); one track quintet with Joe Kennedy Jr. (violin), Jamil Nasser (bass), Muhammad (drums), Badrena (percussion); one track quintet with Donald Byrd (trumpet) replacing Kennedy Jr.	
1996	Live in Paris 1996	Dreyfus	With George Coleman (tenor sax), Calvin Keys (guitar), Joe Kennedy (violin), Jeff Chambers (bass), Yoron Israel (drums), Manolo Badrena (percussion); in concert at the Salle Pleyel, Paris. Released in 2003	
1997	Nature: The Essence Part Three	Birdology	Most tracks quintet, with James Cammack (bass), Othello Molineaux (steel drum), Idris Muhammad (drums), Manolo Badrena (percussion); one track sextet, with Stanley Turrentine (tenor sax) added	
1998	Ahmad Jamal with The Assai Quartet	Roesch	With Ephraim Wolfolk (bass), Arti Dixson (drums), Claude Giron (cello), Suzanne Lefevre (viola), Peter Biely (violin) and Jaroslaw Lis (violin); in concert at Yale University	
2001	Picture Perfect	Birdology	Some tracks trio, with James Cammack and Jamil Nasser (bass; separately), Idris Muhammad (drums); some tracks quartet, with Mark Cargill (violin) added	
2000	À L'Olympia	Dreyfus	Quartet, with George Coleman (tenor sax), James Cammack (bass), Idris Muhammad (drums); in concert; also known as Olympia 2000 and Ahmad Jamal 70th Birthday. Released 2001	
2002	In Search of... Momentum	Birdology	Trio, with James Cammack (bass), Idris Muhammad (drums). Released 2003	
2004	After Fajr	Birdology	Most tracks trio, with James Cammack (bass), Idris Muhammad (drums); one tracks quintet, with Donna McElroy and Vox One (vocals) added; in concert at the Arts Center of Enghien-les-Bains, France	
2007	It's Magic	Birdology	Quartet, with James Cammack (bass), Idris Muhammad (drums), Manolo Badrena (percussion)	
2008	Poinciana: One Night Only	Stardust		
2009	A Quiet Time	Dreyfus	With James Cammack (bass), Kenny Washington (drums), Manolo Badrena (percussion)	
2011	Blue Moon	Jazzbook Records / Jazz Village	With Reginald Veal (bass), Herlin Riley (drums), Manolo Badrena (percussion); nominated as Best Jazz Instrumental Album at the 55th Annual Grammy Awards	
2012	Ahmad Jamal & Yusef Lateef/Live At The Olympia	Jazzbook Records / Jazz Village	Ahmad Jamal piano, Yusuf Lateef saxophone, flute, vocals, Reginald Veal bass, Manolo Badrena percussion, Herlin Riley drums	
2013	Saturday Morning: La Buissonne Studio Sessions	Jazzbook Records / Jazz Village	With Reginald Veal (bass), Herlin Riley (drums), Manolo Badrena (percussion)	
2016	Marseille	Jazzbook Records / Jazz Village	Most tracks quartet, with James Cammack (bass), Herlin Riley (drums), Manolo Badrena (percussion); one track quintet with Abd Al Malik (spoken word) added; one track quintet with Mina Agossi (vocals) added	
2019	Ballades	Jazzbook Records / Jazz Village	Most tracks solo piano; three tracks with James Cammack (bass)	

=== Compilations ===
- 1967: Standard Eyes (Cadet)
- 1972: Inspiration (Cadet)
- 1974: Re-evaluations: The Impulse! Years (Impulse!)
- 1980: The Best of Ahmad Jamal (20th Century)
- 1998: Cross Country Tour 1958–1961 (Chess/GRP Records)
- 2005: The Legendary Okeh & Epic Recordings (1951–1955) (Columbia Legacy)
- 2007: Complete Live at the Pershing Lounge 1958 (Gambit)
- 2007: Complete Live at the Spotlite Club 1958 (Gambit)
- 2010: The Complete Ahmad Jamal Trio Argo Sessions 1956-62 (Mosaic Records)
- 2014: Complete Live at the Blackhawk (Essential Jazz Classics)
- 2022: Emerald City Nights: Live at the Penthouse 1963–1964 (Jazz Detective)
- 2022: Emerald City Nights: Live at the Penthouse 1965-1966 (Jazz Detective)
- 2023: Emerald City Nights: Live at the Penthouse 1966-1968 (Jazz Detective)

=== As sideman ===
With Ray Brown

- Some of My Best Friends Are...The Piano Players (Telarc, 1994)

With Pat Metheny/Gary Burton/The Heath Brothers

- All The Things You Are (Fruit Tree, 1999)

With Shirley Horn

- May the Music Never End (Verve, 2003)
