= Ahmad Jamal at the Blackhawk =

Live album by Ahmad Jamal
- Released: 1962
- Recorded: January 31 & February 1, 1962
- Venue: The Blackhawk, San Francisco, California
- Genre: Jazz
- Length: 37:21
- Label: Argo; LPS-703
- Producer: Paul Gayton

Ahmad Jamal chronology
All of You (1961)	Ahmad Jamal at the Blackhawk (1962)	Macanudo (1962)

Ahmad Jamal at the Blackhawk is a live album by American jazz pianist Ahmad Jamal featuring trio performances recorded in San Francisco in 1962 and released on the Argo label.

== Background ==
This was the final recording of the Ahmad Jamal Trio featuring bassist Israel Crosby and drummer Vernel Fournier. Several months after it was made, Crosby died of a heart attack. Jamal did not record another new trio album for more than two years—another live album titled Naked City Theme.

The liner notes to the original Blackhawk LP were written by the jazz record producer and critic John Hammond, who described the trio's playing as "some of the most sensitive, delicate and subtle music in jazz history." He also noted that Jamal played on this album "with a gusto he usually hides."

As was typical for the trio, the repertoire mostly consists of jazz standards but also includes a Jamal original, "Night Mist Blues".

== Reissues ==
The music from this live recording appears on various Jamal CD compilations, including The Complete Ahmad Jamal Trio Argo Sessions, a 9-CD set issued by the Mosaic label.

In 2022, American Jazz Classics released a 2-CD set titled The Complete 1962 Ahmad Jamal at the Blackhawk, which includes the contents of the original LP along with two bonus tracks ("Darn That Dream" and "On Green Dolphin Street") as the first disc and then nine additional tracks, including alternate takes, as a second disc. As JazzMessengers.com noted, "This release compiles all known 1962 performances by the celebrated Ahmad Jamal Trio with Israel Crosby and Vernel Fournier at the Blackhawk club in San Francisco."

== Critical reception ==
Professional ratings
Review scores
Source	Rating
AllMusic	3/5 stars

In a 1963 review of the original LP, the Jazz Journal wrote, "Jamal has a beautiful light touch, delicate and tuneful. His playing is polished and rhythmic, and in a sparse kind of fashion he swings quite pleasantly. ... He gets strong support from the late Israel Crosby, a really great bassist, and Fournier, whose brush work is very admirable."

A retrospective review by Tony Augarde for MusicWeb International notes that the trio members "knew each other well and played together with complete empathy. Jamal is certainly not an easy pianist to accompany, as he switches without warning from quiet passages (or even complete silence) to sudden outbursts on the piano. And yet the impetus keeps going, even when Ahmad is not actually playing. The whole trio sets a rhythm so firmly that it stays in your head. ... Jamal varies the music by a host of devices, including not only his long pauses but also by a variety of runs (which are as impressive as those of Art Tatum) and setting up riffs which derive from the melody despite often being entirely unexpected. And the melody is crucially important to Ahmad: his improvisations seldom stray too far away from the tune. This makes his playing accessible to every kind of listener—but it doesn't stop him throwing in all kinds of quirky quotations."

AllMusic awarded the original album 3 stars but has not supplied written reviews of either the original album or the complete 2022 reissue.

== Track listing ==
1. "I'll Take Romance / My Funny Valentine" (Ben Oakland, Oscar Hammerstein II / Lorenz Hart, Richard Rodgers) – 6:12
2. "Like Someone in Love" (Johnny Burke, Jimmy Van Heusen) – 2:46
3. "Falling in Love With Love" (Hart, Rodgers) – 4:15
4. "The Best Thing for You" (Irving Berlin) – 4:57
5. "April in Paris" (Vernon Duke, E. Y. Harburg) – 4:15
6. "The Second Time Around" (Sammy Cahn, Van Heusen) – 4:07
7. "We Live in Two Different Worlds" (Fred Rose) – 4:24
8. "Night Mist Blues" (Ahmad Jamal) – 6:45

== Personnel ==
- Ahmad Jamal – piano
- Israel Crosby – bass
- Vernel Fournier – drums
