= Rare Form! =

Live album by George Shearing
- Released: June 1966
- Recorded: July 5–6, 1963
- Genre: Jazz
- Label: Capitol ST 2447
- Producer: Dave Cavanaugh, Tom Morgan

George Shearing chronology
Hear & Now! (1966)	Rare Form! (1966)	That Fresh Feeling! (1966)

Rare Form! is a live album by George Shearing and his quintet, recorded in San Francisco in July 1963. It was released in 1966.

== Reception ==
Professional ratings
Review scores
Source	Rating
Allmusic	4/5 stars

Scott Yanow reviewed the album for Allmusic and wrote that Shearing and his quintet "...are heard on a variety of spirited live performances throughout this LP".

== Track listing ==
1. "The Sweetest Sounds" (Richard Rodgers) - 2:48
2. "Look No Further" (Rodgers) - 2:03
3. "Hallucinations" (Bud Powell) - 3:53
4. "Sunny" (George Shearing, Milt Raskin) - 3:01
5. "They All Laughed" (George Gershwin, Ira Gershwin) - 2:44
6. "Station Break" (Shearing) - 2:51
7. "Over the Rainbow" (E.Y. Harburg, Harold Arlen) - 2:26
8. "Why Not?" (Doug Marsh) - 3:29
9. "I'll Never Smile Again" (Ruth Lowe) - 3:10
10. "Bop, Look and Listen" (Shearing) - 8:36

== Personnel ==
- George Shearing - piano, arranger
- Armando Peraza - percussion
- Gary Burton - vibraphone
- Ron Anthony - guitar
- Gene Cherico - double bass
- Vernel Fournier - drums
- Reice Hamel - Recording Engineer
