= Listen to the Ahmad Jamal Quintet =

Studio album by Ahmad Jamal
- Released: 1961
- Recorded: August 15–17, 1960
- Studio: Ter-Mar Recording Studios, Chicago
- Genre: Jazz
- Length: 33:28
- Label: Argo; LPS-673
- Producer: Jack Tracy

Ahmad Jamal chronology
At the Pershing, Vol. 2 (1961)	Listen to the Ahmad Jamal Quintet (1961)	Ahmad Jamal's Alhambra (1961)

Professional ratings
Review scores
Source	Rating
Allmusic	4.5/5 stars

Listen to the Ahmad Jamal Quintet is an album by American jazz pianist Ahmad Jamal featuring performances recorded in 1960 and released on the Argo label.

== Critical reception ==
Allmusic awarded the album 4½ stars.

== Track listing ==
1. "Ahmad's Waltz" (Ahmad Jamal) – 4:44
2. "Valentina" (Christine Reynolds) – 2:19
3. "Yesterdays" (Otto Harbach, Jerome Kern) – 2:57
4. "Tempo for Two" (Joe Kennedy) – 3:26
5. "Hallelujah" (Vincent Youmans, Leo Robin) – 2:06
6. "It's a Wonderful World" (Harold Adamson, Jan Savitt, Johnny Watson) – 2:50
7. "Baía" (Ary Barroso) – 4:04
8. "You Came a Long Way from St. Louis" (John Benson Brooks, Bob Russell) – 3:53
9. "Lover Man" (Jimmy Davis, Ram Ramirez, James Sherman) – 4:04
10. "Who Cares?" (George Gershwin, Ira Gershwin) – 3:05

== Personnel ==
- Ahmad Jamal – piano
- Joe Kennedy – violin
- Ray Crawford – guitar
- Israel Crosby – bass
- Vernel Fournier – drums
