= Ahmad Jamal Plays =

Studio album by Ahmad Jamal
- Released: 1955
- Recorded: May 23, 1955; Chicago
- Genre: Jazz
- Length: 36:04
- Label: Parrot; Argo LPS-602
- Producer: Dave Usher

Ahmad Jamal chronology
| Ahmad Jamal Plays (1955) | The Ahmad Jamal Trio (1956) |

Chamber Music of the New Jazz Cover

Ahmad Jamal Plays is an album by American jazz pianist Ahmad Jamal featuring performances recorded in 1955 and originally released on the short-lived Parrot label in 1955. The album was rereleased as Chamber Music of the New Jazz on the Argo label after Chess Records purchased the master tapes in 1956.

At this time, Jamal still performed with a trio including a guitar rather than drums, modeled on the trio of Nat King Cole. The album includes seven jazz standards and two originals, one by Jamal and one by guitarist Ray Crawford. Jamal's contribution, "New Rhumba", was later transcribed note for note by arranger Gil Evans for the 1957 Miles Davis album Miles Ahead.

The cover was credited to Eric Anderson, Jr.

== Critical reception ==
Professional ratings
Review scores
| Source | Rating |
|---|---|
| AllMusic | 4.5/5 stars |

Scott Yanow, in his review for AllMusic, says Jamal's "communication with Crawford and Crosby was often magical."

A reviewer for Dusty Groove wrote: "Beautiful work from Jamal's early Chicago years ... that really gets at the differences he made in modern jazz! The tunes are wonderfully fluid, soulful, and swinging ... in a lightly modern style that features almost equal interplay between Jamal's piano, the bass of Israel Crosby, and the guitar of the wonderful Ray Crawford, who adds an amazing touch to the record."

== Track listing ==
1. "New Rhumba" (Ahmad Jamal) – 4:42
2. "A Foggy Day" (George Gershwin, Ira Gershwin) – 4:26
3. "All of You" (Cole Porter) – 3:19
4. "It Ain't Necessarily So" (Gershwin, Gershwin) – 3:04
5. "I Don't Wanna Be Kissed (By Anyone But You)" (Jack Elliot, Harold Spina) – 3:29
6. "I Get a Kick Out of You" (Porter) – 4:53
7. "Jeff" (Ray Crawford) – 4:56
8. "Darn That Dream" (Eddie DeLange, Jimmy Van Heusen) – 3:14
9. "Spring Is Here" (Lorenz Hart, Richard Rodgers) – 4:01

== Personnel ==
- Ahmad Jamal – piano
- Ray Crawford – guitar
- Israel Crosby – bass
