= The Ahmad Jamal Trio =

Studio album by Ahmad Jamal
- Released: 1956
- Recorded: October 1955
- Studios: Columbia 30th Street Studio, New York City
- Genre: Jazz
- Length: 36:04
- Label: Epic LN 3212

Ahmad Jamal chronology
Ahmad Jamal Plays (1955)	The Ahmad Jamal Trio (1956)	Count 'Em 88 (1956)

Professional ratings
Review scores
Source	Rating
AllMusic	4.5/5 stars

The Ahmad Jamal Trio is an album by American jazz pianist Ahmad Jamal. It was released on the Epic label.

== Critical reception ==
AllMusic awarded the album 4½ stars, stating that "Jamal was creating quite a stir at the time with his fresh chord voicings and use of space and dynamics."

== Track listing ==
1. "Perfidia" (Alberto Dominguez) – 3:57
2. "Love for Sale" (Cole Porter) – 8:32
3. "Rica Pulpa" (Eliseo Grenet) – 3:51
4. "Autumn Leaves" (Joseph Kosma, Johnny Mercer) – 2:41
5. "Squeeze Me" (Duke Ellington) – 3:51
6. "Something to Remember You By" (Arthur Schwartz, Howard Dietz) – 2:49
7. "Black Beauty" (Duke Ellington) – 3:27
8. "The Donkey Serenade" (Herbert Stothart, Rudolf Friml) – 3:18
9. "Don't Blame Me" (Dorothy Fields, Jimmy McHugh) – 3:22
10. "They Can't Take That Away from Me" (George Gershwin, Ira Gershwin) – 3:00

== Personnel ==
- Ahmad Jamal – piano
- Ray Crawford – guitar
- Israel Crosby – bass
