= Ray Crawford (musician) =

American jazz guitarist

- Born: February 7, 1924; Pittsburgh, Pennsylvania, U.S.
- Died: December 30, 1997 (aged 73) Los Angeles, California, U.S.
- Genres: Jazz
- Occupations: Musician, composer
- Instruments: Guitar, saxophone
- Years active: 1940s–1990s
- Formerly of: Ahmad Jamal, Gil Evans

Ray Crawford (February 7, 1924 – December 30, 1997) was an American jazz guitarist who originally played tenor saxophone, until tuberculosis prevented him continuing with the instrument. He made notable contributions to albums by Ahmad Jamal, Gil Evans, and Sonny Criss, and pioneered a technique of rhythmic bongo-style guitar accompaniment. Favourite amongst his recorded solos were those on "La Nevada" on Gil Evans's Out of the Cool album.

== Discography ==
=== As leader ===
- I Know Pres Rec 1961, released 1971, later reissued as Smooth Groove
- It's About Time (1977)
- One Step at a Time (1978)

=== As sideman ===
With Ahmad Jamal

- Chamber Music of the New Jazz (1955)
- The Ahmad Jamal Trio (1956)
- Listen to the Ahmad Jamal Quintet (1961)

With Gil Evans

- Great Jazz Standards (1960)
- Out of the Cool (1961)

With Curtis Amy & Dupree Bolton

- Katanga! (1963)

With Lorez Alexandria

- Alexandria the Great (1964)
- More of the Great Lorez Alexandria (1964)

With Lou Donaldson

- Possum Head (1964)

With Jimmy Smith

- Bluesmith (1972)

With Sonny Criss

- Crisscraft (1975)

With Tom Waits

- Blue Valentine (1978)
