= Mellon Jazz Festival =

Former music festival in Pittsburgh, Pennsylvania, US

Coordinates: 40°26′23″N 79°58′35″W

- Genre: Jazz
- Locations: Pittsburgh, Pennsylvania
- Years active: 1964–2003

The Mellon Jazz Festival was a festival in Pittsburgh, Pennsylvania, that was sponsored by Mellon Bank. Acts who performed at the festival included Ella Fitzgerald, Diana Krall, Sonny Rollins, and John Zorn. The event began under the name Pittsburgh Jazz Festival in 1964 and closed in 2003.
