= Ahmad Jamal's Alhambra =

Live album by Ahmad Jamal
- Released: 1961
- Recorded: June 1961; Alhambra, Chicago
- Genre: Jazz
- Length: 41:21
- Labels: Argo; LPS-685
- Producer: Leonard Chess

Ahmad Jamal chronology
Listen to the Ahmad Jamal Quintet (1961)	Ahmad Jamal's Alhambra (1961)	All of You (1961)

Professional ratings
Review scores
Source	Rating
Allmusic	4/5 stars

Ahmad Jamal's Alhambra is a live album by American jazz pianist Ahmad Jamal, featuring performances recorded at Jamal's own club in Chicago in 1961 and released on the Argo label.

== Critical reception ==
At the time of its release, Ahmad Jamal's Alhambra received largely favorable reviews.

In Down Beat, John S. Wilson awarded the album three and a half out of five stars, praising Jamal's polished playing and the support of bassist Israel Crosby and drummer Vernell Fournier, but describing the result as "only one step removed from background music".

Billboard Music Week praised the trio's swing and noted that the audience's applause added to the liveliness of the recording.

William Hilliard, writing in Portland's Sunday Oregonian, called the album Jamal's "best yet".

William D. Laffler of United Press International selected it as his "LP of the Week".

Chick Ober of the Tampa Bay Times described Jamal as one of the finest jazz pianists of his generation and wrote that his talent "was never heard to better advantage than in this LP".

In a retrospective review, Allmusic awarded the album 4 stars, stating: "The interplay between the musicians was often magical."

== Track listing ==
1. "We Kiss in a Shadow" (Richard Rodgers, Oscar Hammerstein II) – 4:47
2. "Sweet and Lovely" (Gus Arnheim, Harry Tobias, Jules LeMare) – 3:53
3. "The Party's Over" (Adolph Green, Betty Comden, Jule Styne) – 3:55
4. "Love for Sale" (Cole Porter) – 4:00
5. "Snow Fall" (Claude Thornhill) – 2:23
6. "Broadway" (Billy Byrd, Teddy McRae, Henri Woode) – 7:35
7. "Willow Weep for Me" (Ann Ronell) – 3:55
8. "Autumn Leaves" (Joseph Kosma, Jacques Prévert) – 3:45
9. "Isn't It Romantic?" (Rodgers, Lorenz Hart) – 4:15
10. "The Breeze and I" (Ernesto Lecuona, Al Stillman) – 2:53

== Personnel ==
=== Performance ===
- Ahmad Jamal – piano
- Israel Crosby – bass
- Vernel Fournier – drums

=== Production ===
- Leonard Chess – supervision
- Ron Malo – engineer
- Don Bronstein – cover art
- Sid McCoy – liner notes
