= Macanudo (album) =

Studio album by Ahmad Jamal
- Released: 1963
- Recorded: December 20 & 23, 1962
- Studio: Van Gelder, Englewood Cliffs, New Jersey
- Genre: Jazz
- Length: 26:04
- Label: Argo; LPS-712
- Producer: 26:05

Ahmad Jamal chronology
Ahmad Jamal at the Blackhawk (1962)	Macanudo (1963)	Poinciana (1963)

Macanudo is an album by jazz pianist Ahmad Jamal of performances by Jamal with an orchestra conducted by Richard Evans. It was recorded in 1962 and released on the Argo label.

== Critical reception ==
Professional ratings
Review scores
Source	Rating
AllMusic	2/5 stars
The Virgin Encyclopedia of Jazz	3/5 stars

AllMusic awarded the album 2 stars.

A reviewer for Billboard wrote: "The album is a solid pop item, a fine thing for change of pace programming... It's very lyric in content and full of gentle and verveful melody with rhythm."

== Track listing ==
All compositions by Richard Evans

1. "Montevideo" – 2:57
2. "Bogota" – 4:00
3. "Sugar Loaf at Twilight" – 3:14
4. "Haitian Marketplace" – 2:57
5. "Buenos Aires" – 3:59
6. "Bossa Nova Do Marilla" – 2:56
7. "Carnival in Panama" – 3:29
8. "Belo Horizonte" – 2:32

== Personnel ==
- Ahmad Jamal – piano - except track 3, celesta
- Art Davis – double bass
- Orchestra conducted by Richard Evans
