= Happy Moods =

Studio album by Ahmad Jamal
- Released: 1960
- Recorded: January 20–21, 1960
- Studio: Ter-Mar Recording Studios, Chicago
- Genre: Jazz
- Length: 36:36
- Label: Argo; LPS-662
- Producer: Jack Tracy

Ahmad Jamal chronology
The Piano Scene of Ahmad Jamal (1959)	Happy Moods (1960)	At the Pershing, Vol. 2 (1961)

Happy Moods is an album by American jazz pianist Ahmad Jamal featuring performances recorded in 1960 and released on the Argo label.

== Critical reception ==
Professional ratings
Review scores
Source	Rating
Allmusic	3/5 stars

Allmusic awarded the album 3 stars stating "Happy Moods does nothing to diminish the position of those who believe that the pianist deserves a considerably higher spot than he is usually accorded".

== Track listing ==
1. "Little Old Lady" (Hoagy Carmichael, Stanley Adams) – 5:10
2. "For All We Know" (J. Fred Coots, Sam M. Lewis) – 2:42
3. "Pavanne" (Morton Gould) – 5:42
4. "Excerpt from the Blues" (Ahmad Jamal) – 2:58
5. "You'd Be So Easy to Love" (Cole Porter) – 3:16
6. "Time on My Hands" (Harold Adamson, Mack Gordon, Vincent Youmans) – 1:34
7. "Rain Check" (Billy Strayhorn) – 4:45
8. "I'll Never Stop Loving You" (Nicholas Brodszky, Sammy Cahn) – 3:01
9. "Speak Low" (Ogden Nash, Kurt Weill) – 4:53
10. "Rhumba No. 2" (Jamal) – 2:35

== Personnel ==
- Ahmad Jamal – piano
- Israel Crosby – bass
- Vernel Fournier – drums
