= All of You (Ahmad Jamal album) =

Live album by Ahmad Jamal
- Released: 1962
- Recorded: June 1961
- Venue: Alhambra, Chicago
- Genre: Jazz
- Length: 32:55
- Label: Argo; LPS-691
- Producer: Leonard Chess

Ahmad Jamal chronology
Ahmad Jamal's Alhambra (1961)	All of You (1962)	Ahmad Jamal at the Blackhawk (1962)

All of You is a live album by American jazz pianist Ahmad Jamal featuring performances recorded at Jamal's own club in Chicago in 1961 and released on the Argo label. On the cover, photographed by Don Bronstein, one of the first staff photographers for Playboy magazine, Jamal sits in an MAA chair, designed by George Nelson.

== Critical reception ==
Professional ratings
Review scores
Source	Rating
AllMusic	4/5 stars
New Record Mirror	4/5 stars

AllMusic awarded the album 4 stars, stating, "Jamal's group had a personal sound of its own, often playing quietly and leaving space but never losing the passion".

== Track listing ==
1. "Time on My Hands" (Harold Adamson, Mack Gordon, Vincent Youmans) – 6:15
2. "Angel Eyes" (Earl Brent, Matt Dennis) – 4:12
3. "You Go to My Head" (J. Fred Coots, Haven Gillespie) – 7:50
4. "Star Eyes" (Gene de Paul, Don Raye) – 5:55
5. "All of You" (Cole Porter) – 4:58
6. "You're Blasé" (Ord Hamilton, Bruce Siever) – 3:26
7. "What Is This Thing Called Love?" (Porter) – 5:29

== Personnel ==
- Ahmad Jamal – piano
- Israel Crosby – bass
- Vernel Fournier – drums
