= Billy Boy =

American folk song

"Billy Boy" is a traditional folk song and nursery rhyme found in the United States, in which "Billy Boy" is asked various questions, and the answers all center on his quest to marry a girl who is said to be too young to leave her mother.

It has a Roud Folk Song Index number of 326. It is a variant of the traditional English folk song "My Boy Billy", collected by Ralph Vaughan Williams and published by him in 1912 as number 232 in Novello's School Songs.

== Origins and interpretations ==
The nursery rhyme, framed in question-and-answer form, is ironic and teasing in tone:

Oh, where have you been, Billy Boy, Billy Boy?

Oh, where have you been, Charming Billy?
I have been to seek a wife, she's the joy of my whole life

But she's a young thing and cannot leave her mother

The narrative of the song has been related by some to "Lord Randall", a murder ballad from the British Isles, in which the suitor is poisoned by the woman he visits.

By contrast, Robin Fox uses the song to make a point about cooking and courtship, and observes:

Feeding has always been closely linked with courtship […] With humans this works two ways since we are the only animals who cook: the bride is usually appraised for her cooking ability. (“Can she bake a cherry pie, Billy boy, Billy boy?”) In some cultures this is far more important than her virginity.

In the traditional last verse of the song, Billy Boy is asked how old the girl is. While his answer is convoluted, it reveals an age that is old and not young, adding to the irony and humor of the song.

The song was also parodied in 1941 by Pete Seeger and Lee Hays in an anti-war protest song of the same name.

== In popular culture ==
A line from the song was used as the title for Henry Jaglom's 1983 film Can She Bake a Cherry Pie?, which concerns a middle-aged New York City musician who, after being dumped by her husband, develops a relationship with a middle-aged divorced social worker. The song "Billy Boy" is also performed in the film.

The song was heard in the 1943 film, The Iron Major, the story of football coach Frank Cavanaugh. In the 1948 Walt Disney film So Dear to My Heart, Burl Ives performs snippets of the song throughout the movie.

In the 1981 movie Bill, both Bill and Barry play and sing the song.

The song is used in the Sarah, Plain and Tall movie trilogy.

=== Recordings ===
- Further variants have been recorded, some greatly extending the number of verses and the tasks that the wife can perform. An extended version of the song in which the lover performs many tasks besides baking a cherry pie was collected by Alan Lomax and John Avery Lomax; it appears in American Ballads and Folk Songs. The Lomax version names the woman being courted Betsy Jane.
- A version of the song by Jerry Lee Lewis was released on the 1975 album Rare, Vol. 1.
- Jazz pianist Ahmad Jamal arranged and recorded the song in 1951. The recording was later featured on his 1959 album The Piano Scene of Ahmad Jamal, as well as on the 2008 Poinciana compilation album. (Note: This release is not to be confused with Jamal's 1963 studio album of the same name.)
- Hampton Hawes recorded the song in 1955 on his album Everybody Likes Hampton Hawes.
- Red Garland recorded a version of Jamal's arrangement in 1957. It was released on his 1969 album Red Garland Revisited!.
- Garland also led the rhythm section of Miles Davis' band in a similar performance for Davis' album Milestones (1958). It is the only track on the album that does not feature any horns playing.
- An anti-war version of the song was released by Australian punk band Black Chrome on the 2018 album Age of Rage.
- Guitarist Bill Frisell included an instrumental version of "Billy Boy" in his 1992 album Have a Little Faith.

== See also ==
- National Book Award-winning novel (1998) Charming Billy, by Alice McDermott
