= Anita Darian =

American singer and actress

Anita Darian

Anita Darian (April 26, 1927 – February 1, 2015) was an American singer and actress who had an extensive career from the 1950s to the 2010s.

She was born Anita Margaret Esgandarian in Detroit, Michigan, of Armenian descent. She was a 1945 graduate of Cooley High School. She later studied opera at the Curtis Institute of Music in Philadelphia and the Juilliard School in New York, but first came to popular attention as a featured singer with the short-lived Sauter-Finegan jazz band of the mid-1950s, with whom she recorded for RCA Victor.

A soprano, Darian performed roles with the New York City Opera and was a featured soloist with the New York Philharmonic. She also performed and recorded several roles from musicals, including Julie in a studio recording version of Show Boat for Columbia Masterworks in 1962 with John Raitt, Barbara Cook, and William Warfield. She portrayed Lady Thiang in the 1960 revival of The King and I at New York City Center with Barbara Cook as Anna and Farley Granger as the King. She made a number of classical recordings with various contemporary composers as well as solo albums for Fidelio Records and Kapp Records.

She settled in New York City and worked in everything from opera and classical recitals to television jingles and cartoon voice-overs. She appeared in several television productions of musicals and operas from the 1950s to the 1970s.

Darian also sang the female soprano portion on The Tokens' 1961 #1 hit "The Lion Sleeps Tonight".

As late as 2012, she was featured in concerts honoring the Great American Songbook.

Darian died on February 1, 2015, aged 87, at South Nassau Communities Hospital in Oceanside, New York, due to surgical complications.
