= Joe Kennedy Jr. (violinist) =

American jazz musician

Joe Kennedy Jr. (1923 – April 17, 2004) was an American jazz violinist and educator. Kennedy was born in Pittsburgh, Pennsylvania. He performed and recorded with pianist Ahmad Jamal and was director of jazz studies at Virginia Tech from 1984 to 1995. Kennedy performed with Benny Carter, Toots Thielemans, Billy Taylor, and the Modern Jazz Quartet and appeared at major international jazz festivals including the North Sea Jazz Festival and Monterey Jazz Festival.

== Discography ==
=== As leader ===
- Strings by Candlelight (Red Anchor, 1962)
- Magnifique! (Black and Blue, 1980)
- Accentuate the Positive with Toots Thielemans (Consolidate Artists, 1998)

=== As sideman ===
With Ahmad Jamal

- Listen to the Ahmad Jamal Quintet (Argo, 1960)
- Big Byrd: The Essence Part 2 (Verve, 1997)
- Ahmad Jamal a Paris (WEA, 1999)

With John Lewis

- Kansas City Breaks (Finesse, 1982)

With Billy Taylor

- Where've You Been? (Concord Jazz, 1981)

== Sources ==
- "Mid Atlantic Arts Foundation Living Legacy Jazz Awards". Archived from the original on September 29, 2007.
- "Joe Kennedy Jr". February 2002.
