= Black Beauty (1928 song) =

1928 song by Duke Ellington

Black Beauty is a 1928 jazz composition by Duke Ellington. According to Ellington scholar A.H. Lawrence, the composition originated as a solo piano piece titled "Firewater" that Ellington played at the Cotton Club at the end of intermissions, as his band members returned to the stage. After he orchestrated and recorded the tune, he decided the title did not suit the work. He renamed the piece "Black Beauty" and dedicated it to singer, dancer, and comedian Florence Mills, who had died the previous year. It became one of Ellington's signature songs. Ellington first recorded it in March 1928 with his orchestra—initially for the Brunswick label under the name "The Washingtonians", and then again a week later for the Victor label under the name "Duke Ellington & His Cotton Club Orchestra". Sixth months later, Ellington recorded a solo piano version for the OKeh label. Ellington recorded the song in the studio on several later occasions, the last being a small group version made for the Columbia label in 1960.

== Music ==
Ellington's solo piano recording has a bluesy, somber sound, a contrast to Fats Waller's tune "Bye, Bye Florence" (recorded by Waller in November 1927). Ellington's original orchestrated version has a more upbeat tempo, similar to his late-1920s hits, though later band arrangements abandoned this approach.

== Covers ==
"Black Beauty" has been recorded by:

- Claude Bolling, Bolling Plays Duke Ellington (Fontana, 1960)
- Bert Kaempfert and His Orchestra, A Swingin' Safari (1962)
- Judy Carmichael, Jazz Piano (Statiras/Progressive, 1983)
- Harlem Jazz Orchestra, Harlemania (Lake Records, 2006)
- Luigi Palombi, Ellington: Piano Works (Dynamic, 2016)
