= Buddy Bernier =

American lyricist (1910–1983)

Henry 'Buddy' Bernier (April 21, 1910 – June 18, 1983) was an American lyricist born in Watertown, New York, who was mainly active during the 1940s and 1950s. He came from a show business family and had two sisters, Daisy and Peggy, who were a singer and actress respectively. His mother Margaret was also a singer and dancer.

He was enlisted into the armed forces in April 1941 and served a corporal of the Lincoln Army Air Field before his discharge in March 1946. He died in June 1983 at the age of 73 due to alcoholic cardiomyopathy.

== Career ==
=== Songwriter ===
Among his earliest successes came in 1935, when he had a hit with the song "I Haven't Got A Hat". In 1937, he was credited with being responsible for a sudden dance craze named the "Big Apple", after being inspired by reading a newspaper clipping which mentioned a southern dance type around the floor in an apple shape. Bernier wrote a song about it, naming it "The Big Apple", which shot to the top of the Hit parade, "engulfed the country in a new dance craze" and went on to sell thousands of sheet music copies. The hit brought him success and he soon moved to New York, where he wrote other hits such as "Hurry Home" and "Our Love". He was followed to New York by his sister Daisy, who landed a dancing role. In February 1947, he visited the Virgin Islands to write an advertisement song about the islands, hoping it would "catchy enough" to reach number one in the summer of that year.

Bernier wrote the lyrics for "Poinciana", a 1936 tune by composer Nat Simon that was in the 1952 film Dreamboat. Despite having written the lyrics in 1936, he confessed in 1944 to having never seen a poinciana tree, although hoped he would do so during his time in the army. He was also the lyricist on "The Night Has a Thousand Eyes" (not to be confused with the Bobby Vee song of the same name), co-written with Jerry Brainin and covered by John Coltrane, Harry Belafonte, and others.

In his later years, he collaborated with his daughter Cindy and her band in a medley of some of his original compositions that he had written during the 1940s.

=== Army ===
He was enlisted into the armed forces in April 1941 and served as a gun chief and radar operator on a B-52. He was a corporal of the Lincoln Army Air Field and flew seventeen missions over Japan before being discharged in March 1946.

== Personal ==
Bernier was born in Watertown, New York on April 21, 1910 to parents Henry Bernier Sr and Margaret Barnier (née Flynn), a born singer and dancer. He came from a show business family and lived with his family at 8 Mayflower Parkway in Westport, CT from 1960-1977.

He had two sisters, Daisy who was a singer and Peggy who was an actress. Daisy, who was married to band leader Johnny Long, was a vocalist in her husband's band and died in August 1967. She was known, along with her sister, for playing regular parts in The Fred Waring Show. She credited her interest in music to her brother Buddy, particularly during their student days when they were favorites in their school productions and during her career, worked under the name June Emmett. Buddy was the only one of the three siblings who performed under his own surname, as his sister Peggy was known by their mother's maiden name, Peggy Flynn.

Bernier was married to Jo Bernier and had five daughters including, Cindy Bernier, who worked as an artistic director and choreographer and Robin Bernier, who graduated from Staples High School in 1966 and trained for six weeks to become a flight attendant.

He died in June 1983 at Norfolk, Virginia, at the age of 73. He lived in Kill Devil Hills, North Carolina and was cremated.
