= At the Pershing: But Not for Me =

Live album by Ahmad Jamal
- Released: 1958
- Recorded: January 16, 1958
- Venue: Pershing Hotel, Chicago
- Genre: Jazz
- Label: Argo; LP-628
- Producer: Dave Usher

Ahmad Jamal chronology
Count 'Em 88 (1956)	At the Pershing: But Not for Me (1958)	Ahmad Jamal Trio Volume IV (1958)

At the Pershing: But Not for Me is a 1958 jazz live album by pianist Ahmad Jamal. According to the album jacket, the tapes were made on January 16, 1958, at the Pershing Lounge of Chicago's Pershing Hotel and each set played that night was recorded, a total of 43 tracks, of which 8 were selected by Jamal for the album. The LP was released as Argo Records LP-628. Jamal's previous releases on Argo had been from previously made masters; this was his first release recorded for Argo, and his first album recorded live.

== Critical reception ==
Professional ratings
Review scores
Source	Rating
The Penguin Guide to Jazz Recordings	4/4 stars

The 1958 DownBeat review was mildly negative, referring to Jamal as playing "cocktail music"; the reviewer acknowledged Jamal's skill and influence on other jazz musicians such as Miles Davis, but wrote, "The trio's chief virtue is an excellent, smooth light but flexible beat", and "Throughout the music is kept emotionally, melodically, and organizationally innocuous." In August 1958, Jet magazine referred to the album as "a nationwide hit". The same month, DownBeat posted the album sales counts at over 47,000, noting that any (jazz) album selling 15,000 to 20,000 is "big". The December 1958 DownBeat poll of music retailers showed that the album was the "number one jazz bestseller", and it stayed on Billboard magazine album charts for 107 weeks.

When Jamal was named one of the National Endowment for the Arts 1994 Masters of Jazz, the album was listed as having sold "more than a million copies".

The Penguin Guide to Jazz Recordings listed the album as part of its suggested "core collection" of essential recordings.

The album yielded the eight-minute "Poinciana", which was a "massive jazz hit"; one of "the best selling albums of the decade, But Not For Me's success enabled Jamal to open his own club and restaurant, the Alhambra, where his band held residence when not on tour."

Evident were his unusually minimalist style and his extended vamps, according to reviewer John Morthland in 2010.

On the NPR Basic Jazz Record Library radio show in 2011, Murray Horwitz and A. B. Spellman noted that "Poinciana" became "standard dance music" at parties, and, abridged, appeared on jukeboxes, because "Jamal lets the bass and drums establish a Latin groove that's very appealing. He floats lightly on top of it in a spare, tightly constructed series of embellishments that's full of what the popular music people call 'hooks.' There's a lot of repetition but no redundancy, if you know what I mean."

== Track listing ==
1. "But Not for Me" (George Gershwin, Ira Gershwin) – 3:32
2. "The Surrey with the Fringe on Top" (Richard Rodgers, Oscar Hammerstein II) – 2:35
3. "Moonlight in Vermont" (Karl Suessdorf, John Blackburn) – 3:09
4. "Music, Music, Music" ("Put Another Nickel In") (Bernie Baum, Stephen Weiss) – 2:56
5. "No Greater Love" (Isham Jones, Marty Symes) – 3:26
6. "Poinciana" (Buddy Bernier, Nat Simon) – 8:07
7. "Woody 'n' You" (Dizzy Gillespie) – 3:40
8. "What's New?" (Bob Haggart, Johnny Burke) – 4:11

== Personnel ==
- Ahmad Jamal – piano
- Israel Crosby – bass
- Vernel Fournier – drums
- Malcolm Chisholm – recording engineer
- Dave Usher – producer
