= Poinciana (song) =

Song composed by Nat Simon and Buddy Bernier (1936)

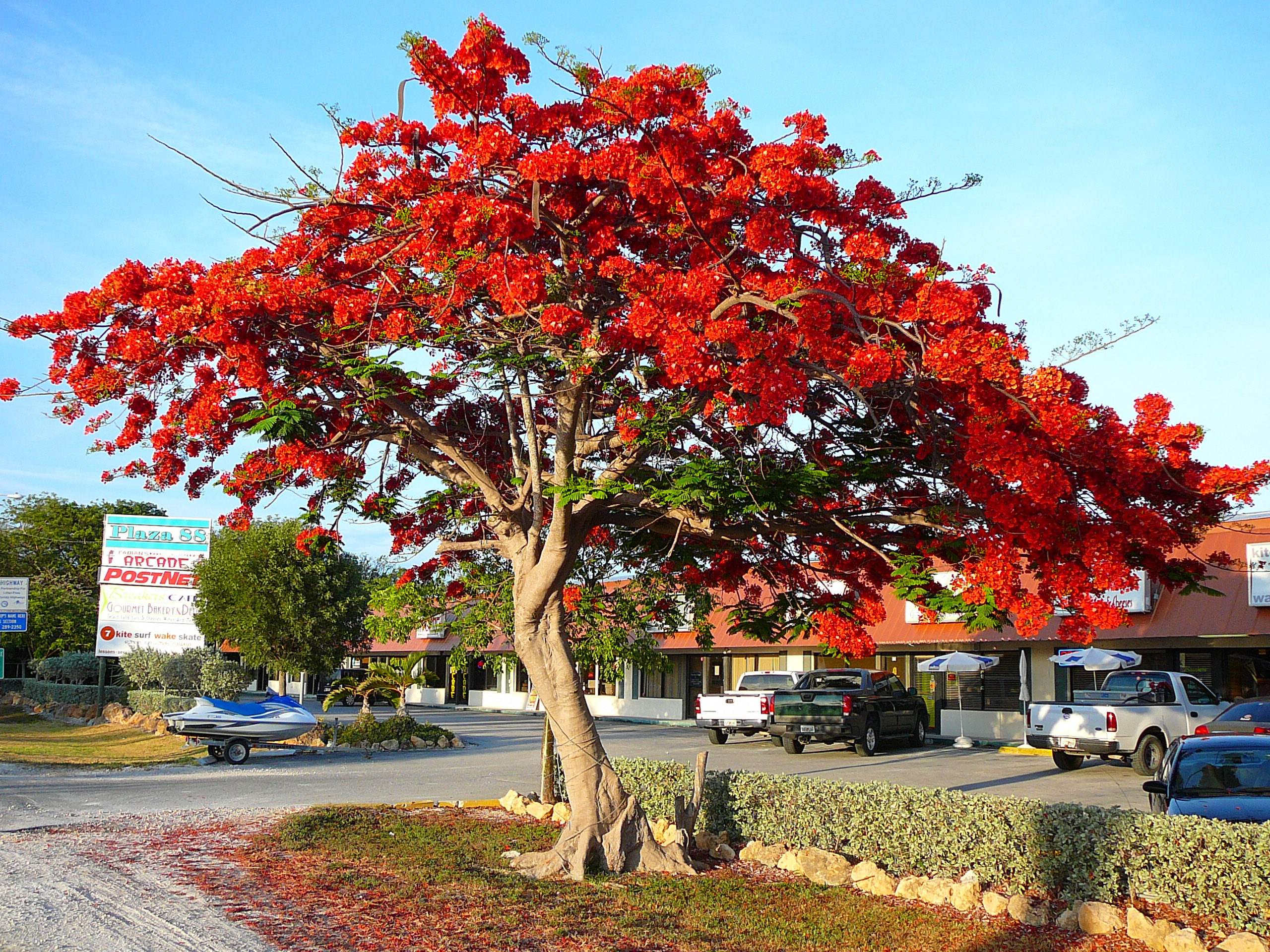
Poinciana tree

"Poinciana" is a song by Nat Simon with English lyrics by Buddy Bernier and Spanish lyrics written in 1936 by Manuel Lliso. The royal poinciana tree is credited as the inspiration for the lyrics. Although at first the song wasn't a hit, in 1943, multiple recordings by popular orchestras and singers were made. In 1952, American singer Steve Lawrence made it to the pop top-25 charts with it. Since then, the song has had multiple inclusions in films, along with more recordings by popular artists, making the song a standard.

== Background ==
The song has been identified as a development of a Cuban folk song entitled "La Canción del Árbol", traditional with new lyrics added by Manuel Lliso in 1936, whose title translates as "the song of the tree", the royal poinciana being a favorite Caribbean flowering plant. However, composer Nat Simon would claim the song's tune came to him while he was dining at the famous Italian restaurant Mamma Leone's in Manhattan's Theater District, and that he jotted down a rough draft of the melody on the tablecloth which – with Leone's permission – he took home to work out the completed melody at his piano. Lyrics for the song were completed in about thirty minutes by Buddy Bernier, who cited as his inspiration a postcard of a royal Poinciana tree he had recently received from Florida.

Reportedly "Poinciana" was largely overlooked for several years, being somewhat longer than a typical contemporary song. Orchestra leader Jerry Wald was a rare early aficionado of the song, and Wald's showcasing of "Poinciana" during his 1943 gig at the Hotel New Yorker has been credited with boosting its profile, "Poinciana" being recorded in 1943 by Glenn Miller with his Army Air Force Band, with three 1944 recordings of the song afforded hit status – those by Benny Carter and His Orchestra; Bing Crosby (recorded October 1, 1943); and David Rose and His Orchestra.

== Notable recordings ==
Its popularity reinforced by its appearance in the 1952 film Dreamboat, "Poinciana" has become a standard of Latin jazz: the theme song of pianist Ahmad Jamal – whose version, introduced on the 1958 album At the Pershing: But Not for Me, would be showcased on the soundtrack of the 1995 film The Bridges of Madison County – the song has also been recorded by Herb Jeffries, Frank Sinatra, George Shearing, Dave Brubeck and Paul Desmond, Sonny Rollins, Johnny Mathis, Shelly Manne, Nat King Cole, Vic Damone, Keith Jarrett, Percy Faith, McCoy Tyner, Diane Schuur, Caterina Valente, Robert Goulet, The Four Freshmen, MFSB, The Manhattan Transfer, Steve Lawrence (his inaugural disc and a chart hit with #21 peak), Nick Brignola, Lew Tabackin, Gerry Mulligan with Chet Baker, Cal Tjader, Jerome Richardson, Shelly Manne, Billy Taylor, Booker Ervin, Aaron Goldberg, Gato Barbieri, Elizabeth Shepherd, Gary Burton, Lou Donaldson, Jeff Hamilton Trio and Vulfpeck. In 1978, disco duo Paradise Express recorded a version which made the top 20 on the disco charts. Paquito D'Rivera and Chano Domínguez also recorded the song.
