= A Gal in Calico =

1946 popular music song

"A Gal in Calico" is a song by the American composer Arthur Schwartz, with words written by Leo Robin.

== Appearance in film ==
The song was introduced in the 1946 film The Time, the Place and the Girl. In the film, it was performed by Dennis Morgan, Jack Carson, Martha Vickers (dubbed by Sally Sweetland) and chorus. It was nominated for Academy Award for Best Original Song of 1948 but lost out to "Zip-a-Dee-Doo-Dah".

== Chart appearances ==
Four versions have entered the US Billboard charts: Johnny Mercer (reached No. 5 in 1946); Tex Beneke (No. 6 in 1947); Benny Goodman (No. 6 in 1947) and Bing Crosby (recorded May 7, 1946, No. 8 in 1947).

== Other recordings ==
The song has also been recorded by: Steve Lawrence, Vic Damone, and the Manhattan Transfer.
