= Vernel Fournier =

American jazz musician (1928–2000)

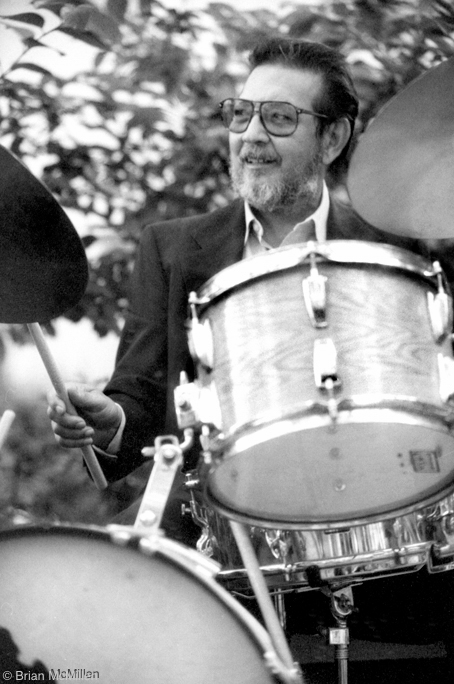
Fournier in New York, NY, playing with Tommy Flanagan and George Mraz, July 7, 1983

Vernel Anthony Fournier (July 30, 1928 – November 4, 2000), known from 1975 as Amir Rushdan, was an American jazz drummer probably best known for his work with Ahmad Jamal from 1956 to 1962.

== Biography ==
Fournier was born in New Orleans, Louisiana, into a Creole family. He left college to join a big band led by King Kolax. After Kolax downsized to a quintet, Fournier moved to Chicago in 1948, where he played with such musicians as Buster Bennett, Paul Bascomb and Teddy Wilson. As house drummer at the Bee Hive club on Chicago's South Side in 1953–55, he accompanied many visiting soloists, including Lester Young, Ben Webster, Sonny Stitt, J.J. Johnson, Earl Washington and Stan Getz.

From 1953 to 1956, Fournier also worked many recording sessions with Al Smith, Red Holloway, Lefty Bates, and others. He joined Ahmad Jamal's trio in 1957, along with bass player Israel Crosby, and remained with the group until 1962, appearing on a series of recordings for the Chess label. The best known of these, At the Pershing: But Not for Me (1958), became one of the best selling jazz records of all time, remaining on the Billboard jazz charts for over two years.

After leaving the Jamal trio, Fournier joined George Shearing for two years before rejoining Jamal briefly in 1965–66. He then took a long-running gig with a trio at a restaurant owned by Elijah Muhammad.

Fournier converted to Islam in 1975, and took the Muslim name of Amir Rushdan.

He worked with Nancy Wilson, Clifford Jordan, Billy Eckstine and Joe Williams, John Lewis and Barry Harris. Fournier was also a teacher of drumming, working at Barry Harris's Jazz Cultural Theater, the New School, and the Mannes College of Music.

A stroke in 1994 left him unable to use his legs and confined him to a wheelchair. Although he was unable to play drums professionally after his stroke, he continued his teaching activities. He died from a cerebral hemorrhage in Jackson, Mississippi, in 2000.

== Discography ==
With Lorez Alexandria

- Deep Roots (Argo, 1962)

With Gary Burton

- 3 in Jazz (RCA, 1963)

With Billy Eckstine and Benny Carter

- Billy Eckstine Sings with Benny Carter (Verve, 1986)

With Ahmad Jamal

- At the Pershing: But Not for Me (Argo, 1958)
- Jamal at the Penthouse (Argo, 1959)
- Happy Moods (Argo, 1960)
- Listen to the Ahmad Jamal Quintet (Argo, 1960)
- Ahmad Jamal's Alhambra (Argo, 1961)
- All of You (Argo, 1961)
- Ahmad Jamal at the Blackhawk (Argo, 1962)
- Poinciana (Argo, 1963)
- Extensions (Argo, 1965)
- Rhapsody (Cadet, 1965)

With Etta Jones

- I'll Be Seeing You (Muse, 1987)

With Sam Jones

- Down Home (Riverside, 1962)

With Clifford Jordan

- Repetition (Soul Note, 1984)
- Dr. Chicago (Bee Hive, 1984)
- Royal Ballads (Criss Cross Jazz, 1986)
- Live at Ethell's (Mapleshade, 1987 [1990])
- Down Through the Years (Milestone, 1991)

With Houston Person

- Very PERSONal (Muse, 1980)

With Jimmy Reed

- "Ain't That Lovin' You, Baby" (Vee-Jay, 1953)
- I'm Jimmy Reed (Vee-Jay, 1955-58 [1958])

With George Shearing

- Mood Latino (Capitol, 1961)
- The Swingin's Mutual! (Capitol, 1961) - with Nancy Wilson
- Jazz Moments (Capitol, 1962)
- Jazz Concert (1963)
- Rare Form! (1966 [1963])

With Frank Strozier

- Cloudy and Cool (Vee Jay, 1960) - with Billy Wallace and Bill Lee

== Drum method ==
- Vernel Fournier - Drum Techniques: Intermediate - Advanced Exercises and Etudes
