= Nat Simon =

American composer (1900–1979)

Nat Simon (6 August 1900 – 5 September 1979) was an American composer, pianist, bandleader and songwriter. Born in Newburgh, New York, from the 1930s to the 1950s, his songs were used in over 20 films. Between 1931 and 1940, he also took part in the musical Vaudeville revue Songwriters on Parade, which featured hit songwriters of the day. It was considered one of the last Vaudevillian forays of this type.

Nat's daughter, Sally Simon Meisel, who sang vocals, was an integral part of his live performances.

== Notable songs ==
- "Poinciana" (1936)
- "The Old Lamp-Lighter" (1946)
- "An Apple Blossom Wedding" (1947)
- "The Mama Doll Song" (1954)
- "Sandy's Tune" (from That Bad Eartha) (1954)
- "Istanbul (Not Constantinople)" (1953)
- "No Can Do" from the Copacabana Revue with Charlie Tobias (1945)
