= Israel Crosby =

American jazz double bassist

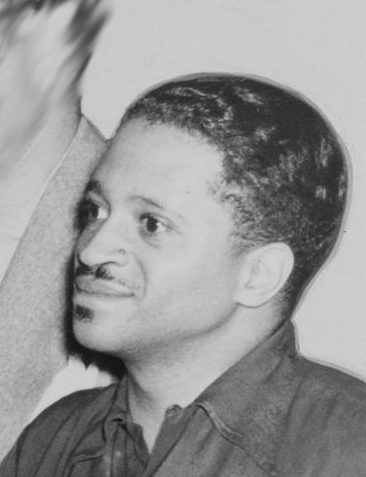
- Israel Crosby

Background information
- Born: January 19, 1919; Chicago, Illinois, U.S.
- Died: August 11, 1962 (aged 43)
- Genre: Jazz
- Occupation: Musician
- Instrument: Double bass

Israel Crosby (January 19, 1919 – August 11, 1962) was an American jazz double-bassist born in Chicago, Illinois, United States. One of the finest to emerge during the 1930s, he was also a member of the Ahmad Jamal trio for most of 1954 to 1962. He is credited with taking one of the first recorded full-length bass solos, on his 1935 recording of "Blues of Israel" with drummer Gene Krupa when he was only 16. Crosby died of a heart attack at age 43, two months after joining the Shearing Quintet.

As Down Beat magazine explained in its obituary, "Early last month [August 1962], while the Shearing Quintet was at the University of Utah's jazz workshop, Crosby was not in the group; he had suffered blinding headaches and blurred vision and had taken a two-week leave of absence to return to Chicago, his home, for a hospital checkup. But before the group left the university, Shearing received a letter from the bassist in which he said he'd soon be well enough to return to the quintet. But Crosby never returned; he died of a blood clot on the heart in Chicago's West Side Veterans Administration Hospital on Aug. 11. He was 43."

== Discography ==
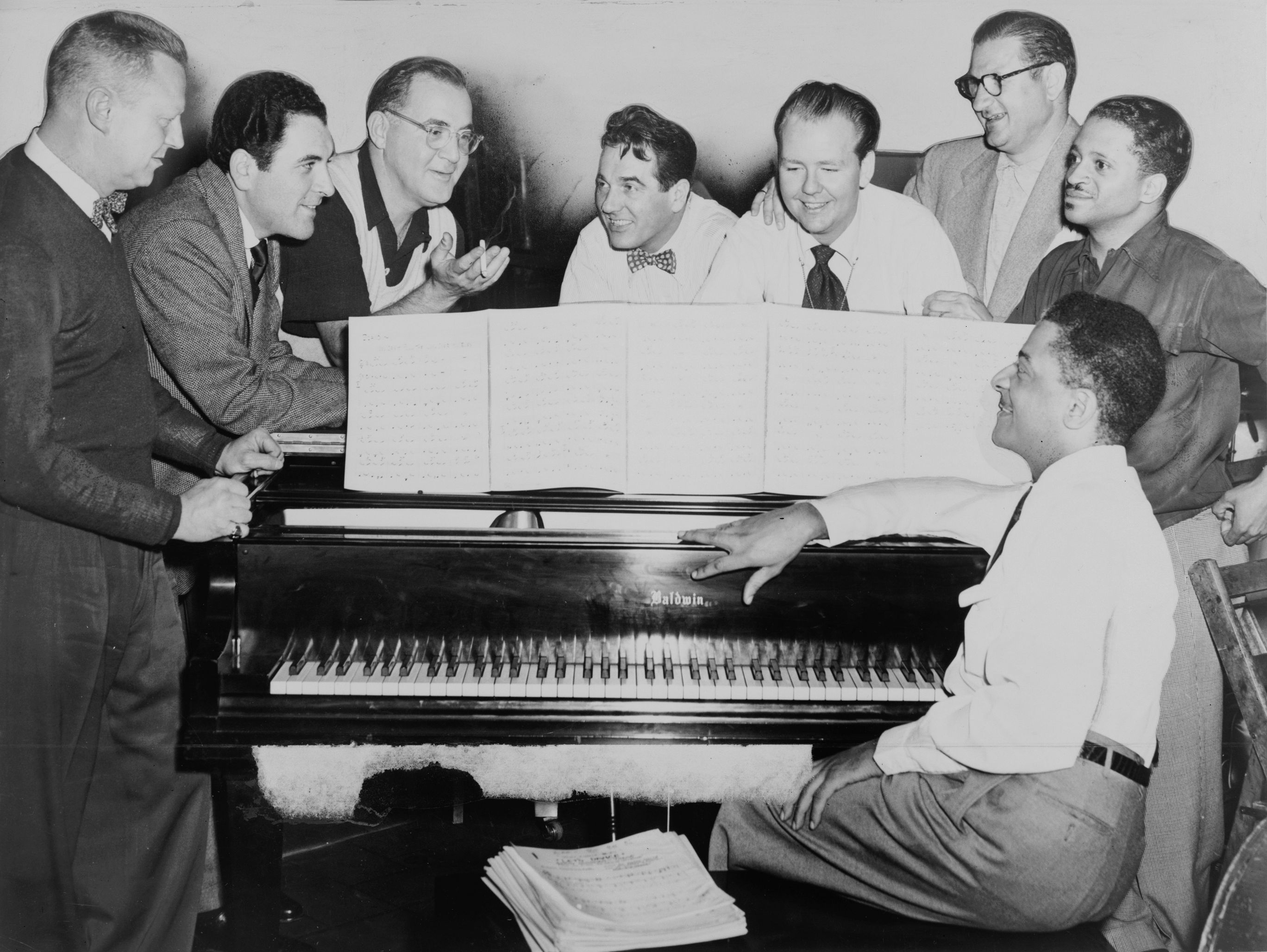
Israel Crosby with Benny Goodman (third from left) and some of Goodman's former musicians in 1952. Left to right: Vernon Brown, George Auld, Goodman, Gene Krupa, Clint Neagley, Ziggy Elman, Crosby and Teddy Wilson (at piano)

=== As sideman ===
With Ahmad Jamal

- Ahmad's Blues (1951, 1955)
- Ahmad Jamal Plays (Parrot, 1955) also released as Chamber Music of the New Jazz (Argo, 1955)
- The Ahmad Jamal Trio (Epic, 1955)
- Count 'Em 88 (Argo, 1956)
- At the Pershing: But Not for Me (1958)
- Live at The Pershing & The Spotlight Club (1958)
- Portfolio of Ahmad Jamal (1958)
- Moonlight in Vermont (1958)
- Happy Moods (Argo, 1960)
- Listen to the Ahmad Jamal Quintet (Argo, 1960)
- Ahmad Jamal's Alhambra (Argo, 1961)
- All of You (Argo, 1961)
- Ahmad Jamal at the Blackhawk (Argo, 1962)
- Cross Country Tour 1958-1961 (1962)
- Poinciana (1963)
- Extensions (1965)
- Heat Wave (1966)
- Standard Eyes (1967)

With others

- Lorez Alexandria: Deep Roots (Argo, 1962)
- Albert Ammons: 1936-1939 (Classics)
- Chu Berry: and his Stompy Stevedores (1937)
- Charlie Christian: Solo Flight (Topaz, 1939–1941)
- Vic Dickenson: Breaks, Blues and Boogie (Topaz, 1941–1946)
- Roy Eldridge: 1943-1944 (Classics), The Big Sound of Little Jazz (Topaz, 1935–41)
- Herb Ellis: The Midnight Roll (Eipc, 1962) (last recording session)
- Edmond Hall: 1936-1944 (Classics)
- Coleman Hawkins: The Complete Coleman Hawkins (Mercury, 1944), Rainbow Mist (Delmark, 1944 [1992]), Verve Jazz Masters 34 (Verve, 1944–62)
- Fletcher Henderson: 1934-1937 (Classics)
- Horace Henderson: 1940 (Classics)
- Sam Jones: Down Home (Riverside, 1962)
- Gene Krupa: 1935-1938 (Classics)
- Meade Lux Lewis: Boogie And Blues (Topaz, 1936–1941)
- George Shearing: Jazz Moments (Capitol, 1962) (Blue Note as of 2008)
- Jess Stacy: 1935-1939 (Classics)
- Earl Washington: (Classics) (Workshop - Motown Imprint, 1962)
