= Piano Portraits by Phineas Newborn =

Studio album by Phineas Newborn Jr.
- Released: 1959
- Recorded: June 17 & 18, 1959; New York City
- Genre: Jazz
- Label: Roulette R 52031

Phineas Newborn Jr. chronology
Stockholm Jam Session Volume 2 (1958)	Piano Portraits by Phineas Newborn (1959)	I Love a Piano (1959)

Piano Portraits by Phineas Newborn is an album by American jazz pianist Phineas Newborn Jr. recorded in 1959 and released on the Roulette label.

== Reception ==
The Allmusic site awarded the album 4 stars.

Professional ratings
Review scores
Source	Rating
Allmusic	4/5 stars

== Track listing ==
1. "Star Eyes" (Gene de Paul, Don Raye) – 2:58
2. "Golden Earrings" (Jay Livingston, Jay Evans, Victor Young) – 3:21
3. "It's All Right With Me" (Cole Porter) – 3:57
4. "I Can't Get Started" (Vernon Duke, Ira Gershwin) – 3:56
5. "Sweet and Lovely" (Gus Arnheim, Jules LeMare, Harry Tobias) – 3:34
6. "Just in Time" (Jule Styne, Betty Comden, Adolph Green) – 2:25
7. "Caravan" (Duke Ellington, Irving Mills, Juan Tizol) – 3:43
8. "For All We Know" (J. Fred Coots, Sam M. Lewis) – 4:14
9. "(Blues Theme) For Left Hand Only" (Phineas Newborn Jr.) – 4:05
10. "Chelsea Bridge" (Billy Strayhorn) – 3:45
- Recorded in New York City on June 17 (tracks 5 & 8) and June 18 (tracks 1–4, 6, 7, 9 & 10), 1959

== Personnel ==
- Phineas Newborn Jr. – piano
- John Simmons – bass
- Roy Haynes – drums
