= Tivoli Encounter =

Live album by Phineas Newborn, Jr. Trio
- Released: 1997
- Recorded: July 16, 1979
- Venues: Jazzhus Slukefter, Tivoli Gardens in Copenhagen, Denmark
- Genre: Jazz
- Length: 45:25
- Label: Storyville STCD 8221
- Producer: Ray Brown

Phineas Newborn, Jr. chronology
Phineas Is Genius (1977)	Tivoli Encounter (1997)	C Jam Blues (1986)

Tivoli Encounter is a live album by American jazz pianist Phineas Newborn, Jr. recorded in Denmark in 1979 at the first Copenhagen Jazz Festival but not released on the Danish Storyville label until 1997.

== Reception ==
The Allmusic review by Scott Yanow states "Although still displaying impressive technique, Newborn does make some errors in spots and sounds just slightly past his prime. ...Not essential, but still worthwhile".

Professional ratings
Review scores
Source	Rating
Allmusic	3/5 stars
The Penguin Guide to Jazz Recordings	2.5/4 stars

== Track listing ==
1. "Oh, Lady Be Good!" (George Gershwin, Ira Gershwin) - 7:05
2. "Don't Blame Me" (Dorothy Fields, Jimmy McHugh) - 6:28
3. "Daahoud" (Clifford Brown) - 4:22
4. "Medley: Billie's Bounce/Walkin'" (Charlie Parker/Richard Carpenter) - 8:40
5. "Sweet and Lovely" (Gus Arnheim, Jules LeMare, Harry Tobias) - 5:36
6. "On Green Dolphin Street" (Bronisław Kaper, Ned Washington) - 6:21
7. "Nica's Dream" (Horace Silver) - 4:56
8. "Medley: Trees/Tea for Two" (Oscar Rasbach, Joyce Kilmer/Vincent Youmans, Irving Caesar) - 8:26
9. "Oleo" (Sonny Rollins) - 3:48
10. "A Night in Tunisia" (Dizzy Gillespie, Frank Paparelli) - 5:58
11. "I'll Remember April" (Gene DePaul, Patricia Johnston, Don Raye) - 3:27

== Personnel ==
- Phineas Newborn, Jr. - piano
- Jesper Lundgaard - bass
- Bjarne Rostvold - drums
