= Harlem Blues (Phineas Newborn Jr. album) =

Studio album by Phineas Newborn Jr.
- Released: 1975
- Recorded: February 12 & 13, 1969; Contemporary Records Studio, Hollywood, CA
- Genre: Jazz
- Length: 41:50
- Label: Contemporary S7634
- Producer: Lester Koenig

Phineas Newborn Jr. chronology
Please Send Me Someone to Love (1969)	Harlem Blues (1975)	Solo Piano (1974)

Harlem Blues is an album by American jazz pianist Phineas Newborn Jr. recorded in 1969 but not released on the Contemporary label until 1975. The album was recorded at the same sessions that produced Please Send Me Someone to Love.

== Reception ==
The Allmusic review by Scott Yanow states "The superb trio (pianist Phineas Newborn, bassist Ray Brown and drummer Elvin Jones) had never played together before but it didn't matter. They had little trouble finding common ground. The virtuosic pianist (still in peak form) leads the way".

Professional ratings
Review scores
Source	Rating
Allmusic	4/5 stars
The Rolling Stone Jazz Record Guide	4/5 stars
The Penguin Guide to Jazz Recordings	3.5/4 stars
DownBeat	4.5/5 stars

== Track listing ==
1. "Harlem Blues" (Phineas Newborn Jr.) – 4:12
2. "Sweet and Lovely" (Gus Arnheim, Jules LeMare, Harry Tobias) – 7:38
3. "Little Girl Blue" (Lorenz Hart, Richard Rodgers) – 6:14
4. "Ray's Idea" (Ray Brown, Gil Fuller) – 5:21
5. "Stella by Starlight" (Ned Washington, Victor Young) – 6:02
6. "Tenderly" (Walter Gross, Jack Lawrence) – 5:55
7. "Cookin' at the Continental" (Horace Silver) – 3:07

== Personnel ==
- Phineas Newborn Jr. – piano
- Ray Brown – bass
- Elvin Jones – drums
