= Ella Fitzgerald Sings Sweet Songs for Swingers =

Studio album by Ella Fitzgerald
- Released: 1959
- Recorded: November 24, 1958 & July 11, 1959
- Genre: Jazz
- Length: 37:55
- Label: Verve MG V-4032
- Producer: Norman Granz

Ella Fitzgerald chronology
Get Happy! (1959)	Ella Fitzgerald Sings Sweet Songs for Swingers (1959)	Ella Fitzgerald Sings the George and Ira Gershwin Songbook (1959)

Ella Fitzgerald Sings Sweet Songs for Swingers is a 1959 album by the American jazz singer Ella Fitzgerald, recorded with a studio Orchestra arranged and conducted by Frank DeVol.

Ella focuses on well known jazz standards by lesser known songwriters, a useful counterbalance to her continuing songbooks project, which at this time found her in the midst of recording the epic George and Ira Gershwin Songbook.

== Reception ==
Professional ratings
Review scores
Source	Rating
AllMusic	3/5 stars
The Penguin Guide to Jazz Recordings	3.5/4 stars

Writing for AllMusic, music critic Scott Yanow wrote of the album "Ella Fitzgerald is in fine form on this obscure LP, performing a dozen standards... An enjoyable if not classic release."

== Track listing ==
For the 1959 Verve LP album, Verve MG VS-6072, re-issued in 2003 on CD; Verve B0000762-02

Side A:

1. "Sweet and Lovely" (Gus Arnheim, Jules LeMare, Harry Tobias) – 3:15
2. "Let's Fall in Love" (Harold Arlen, Ted Koehler) – 3:08
3. "Makin' Whoopee" (Walter Donaldson, Gus Kahn) – 3:47
4. "That Old Feeling" (Lew Brown, Sammy Fain) – 4:20
5. "I Remember You" (Johnny Mercer, Victor Schertzinger) – 2:26
6. "Moonlight Serenade" (Glenn Miller, Mitchell Parish) – 3:03

Side B:

1. "Gone with the Wind" (Herbert Magidson, Allie Wrubel) – 3:04
2. "Can't We Be Friends?" (Paul James, Kay Swift) – 3:25
3. "Out of This World" (Arlen, Mercer) – 4:37
4. "My Old Flame" (Sam Coslow, Arthur Johnston) – 3:06
5. "East of the Sun (And West of the Moon)" (Brooks Bowman) – 3:48
6. "Lullaby of Broadway" (Al Dubin, Harry Warren) – 2:26

== Personnel ==
Recorded in two sessions held on November 24, 1958 and July 11, 1959 in Hollywood, Los Angeles:

- Ella Fitzgerald – vocals
- Harry Edison – trumpet
- Other musicians unidentified
- Frank DeVol – arranger, conductor
