= Shahin Novrasli =

Azerbaijani jazz pianist (born 1977)

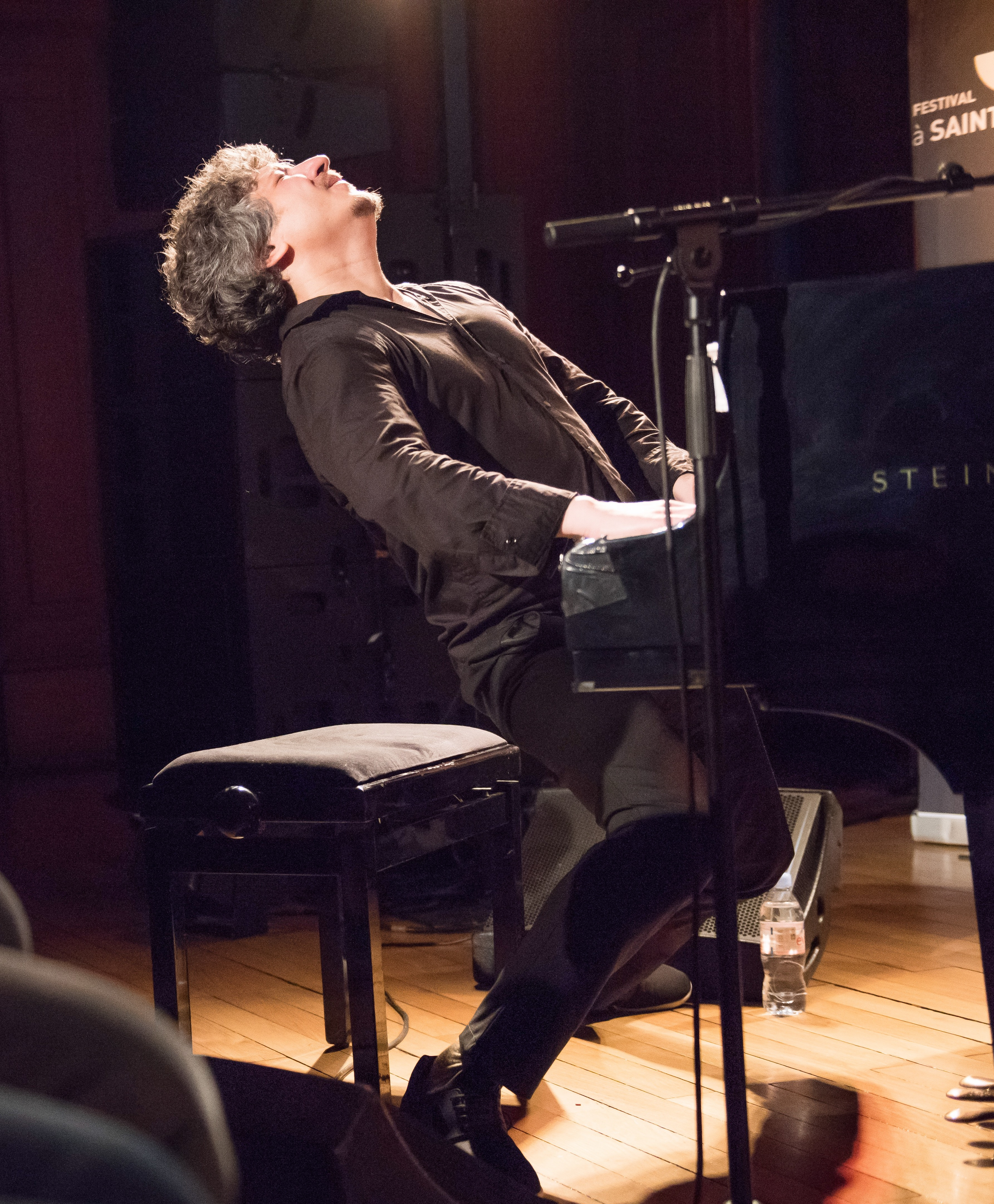
- Novrasli performing in New York, 2017

Background information
- Born: 10 February 1977 (age 49); Baku, Azerbaijan
- Genres: Jazz; jazz-mugham; classical
- Occupations: Musician; composer
- Instrument: Piano
- Labels: Jazz Village; PIAS; Disk Union; Eight Islands
- Website: shahinnovrasli.com

Shahin Novrasli (born 10 February 1977) is an Azerbaijani jazz pianist and composer.

== Early years ==
=== Childhood ===
Born in Baku, Azerbaijan, on 10 February 1977, Novrasli is a descendant of celebrated 19th century Azerbaijani poet Mirza Alesker Novres. His father, professor Novras, and mother, economist Naila, instilled their sons with their own knowledgeable love for good music. At three years old, Novrasli was displaying an interest in music and rhythm. His first major public performance, aged 11, was at the Azerbaijan State Academic Philharmonic Hall for a symphony orchestra concert by composer Azer Rzayev. In college, under Gulya Namazova, Novrasli studied classical music and displayed great skill in performing a range of works by Mozart, Bach, Chopin, Beethoven, Rachmaninoff and other composers. This classical background is incorporated into his jazz compositions. Both playing and composing, jazz became Novrasli's main focus in music.

=== College and music academy ===
From the ages of 15 to 19, Novrasli immersed himself in music, listening to the great jazz pianists Ahmad Jamal, Oscar Peterson, Bill Evans, Keith Jarrett, and Chick Corea, meanwhile studying harmony and composition. After graduating from the Bulbul Music School, he enrolled at the Azerbaijan State Music Academy. There, he studied the music of the pioneering Azerbaijani jazz pianist Vagif Mustafazadeh – who fused jazz with traditional Azerbaijani mugham music – absorbing Mustafazadeh's music into his repertoire.

== Career ==
From 1997, he began to perform in America and Europe in different formats, such as solo, trio, and quartet. He has also experimented with adding unique instruments to the group, including his own voice. Novrasli has recorded three live albums: Live in Moscow, Live in Prague Castle and Jz'Mu, live in Baku. His other recording include the experimental album Eternal Way and Bayati, recorded while living and touring in America and released on the French label Bee Jazz. His detailed study of mugham added another ingredient to his compositions and concerts, furthering the mix of Western and Eastern music.

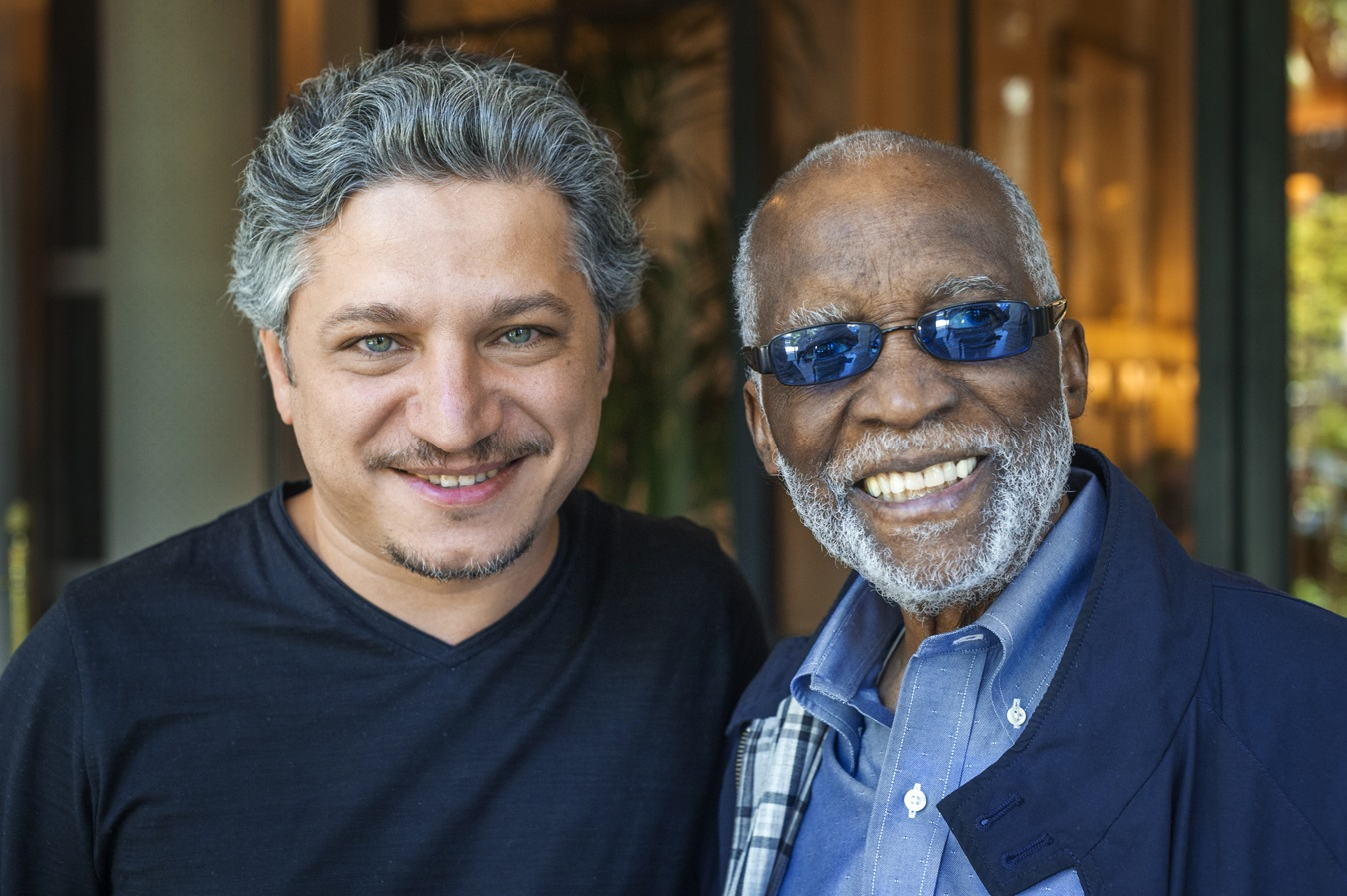
Novrasli with Ahmad Jamal, 2019

A defining moment in Novrasli's work and career was meeting the jazz pianist Ahmad Jamal. In 2014, in the US, Novrasli met Jamal's manager, Laura Hess-Hay; she introduced him to Jamal, who came to view Novrasli's music highly and advocated for his work: "He is one of the great pianists that I've heard of. [...] He's making some great statements in music [...] and his technique is fabulous."

Jamal also co-produced his 2017 album, Emanation, released on the French label Jazz Village / PIAS, which was awarded among the "Best Jazz Albums of 2017" by UK Vibe magazine. On 13 September 2019, alongside Jamal's album Ballades, Novrasli released From Baku to New York City (Jazz Village / PIAS), also produced by Jamal.

=== Shahin Novrasli Festival ===
Nosravli with his Eternal Way Buta Project, 2007

In 2022, Novrasli founded the Shahin Novrasli Festival in collaboration with PASHA Holding and other organizations. This multi-day annual event is held in Baku and takes place in both indoor and outdoor spaces. The performances at this festival include classical music, jazz, flamenco, and mugham piano, in which both international and local musicians take part in. Included with the festival is the "We are the Future" initiative to support young musicians, especially poor children with disabilities.

== Personal life ==
In 2007, Shahin married Natavan Novrasli, a classical singer, an Honored Artist of Azerbaijan, and soloist with the Azerbaijan State Academic Opera and Ballet Theater. Together, they have two sons, born in 2008 and 2015.

== Discography ==
Recording year	Title	Label	Notes / Personnel
2000	Jz'Mu	Shahin Novrasli	Trio; with Ruslan Huseynov (bass) and Iskender Aleskerov (drums)
2001	Live in Moscow	Shahin Novrasli	Trio; with Nathan Peck (bass) and Sasha Mashin (drums)
2003	Eternal Way	Buta	Quintet; with Nathan Peck (bass), Sasha Mashin (drums), Arslan Novrasli (tar) and Nurlan Novrasli (kamancheh)
2012	Live in Prague Castle	Shahin Novrasli	Quartet; with Nathan Peck (bass), Sasha Mashin (drums) and Chris Hemingwey (saxophone)
2017	Emanation	Jazz Village / PIAS	Quintet; with Didier Lockwood (violin), James Cammack (bass), André Ceccarelli (drums) and Irakli Koiava (percussion)
2019	From Baku to New York City	Jazz Village / PIAS	Trio; with James Cammack (bass) and Herlin Riley (drums)
2022	Bayati	Eight Islands / Disk Union	Trio; with Nathan Peck (bass) and Ari Hoenig (drums)
