= Live! At Blues Alley =

Live album by Ahmad Jamal
- Released: 1992
- Recorded: December 30, 1991
- Venue: Blues Alley
- Genre: Jazz
- Length: 45:44
- Label: Blues Alley Music Society
- Producer: Ahmad Jamal, James Smith

Ahmad Jamal chronology
Pittsburgh (1989)	Live! At Blues Alley (1992)	Live in Paris 1992 (1992)

Live! At Blues Alley is a live album by American jazz pianist Ahmad Jamal recorded at Blues Alley in Washington, D.C.–from 1979 to 2000, Ahmad's committed gig was playing Blues Alley on New Year's Eve.

The album was recorded on December 30, 1991, with additional recording done in early 1992 at Muddy Hole Studios in Martinsburg, West Virginia. It was released in early 1992 by the Blues Alley Music Society.

The first track, "Effendi", is a tribute to fellow jazz master Jimmy Heath.

== Critical reception ==
Professional ratings
Review scores
Source	Rating
AllMusic	4/5 stars
The Penguin Guide to Jazz Recordings	3/4 stars

In his review for AllMusic, Ken Dryden states: "Ahmad Jamal is heard during a well-recorded 1991 live set at Blues Alley. He's accompanied by electric bassist James Cammack and drummer David Bowler, while percussionist Selden Newton is added on selected tracks. Starting with a furious take of "Effendi," Jamal detours into two pieces from Miles Davis' repertoire, "So What" and "Milestones," while keeping the tension at a high level. Bill Evans' lovely ballad "Your Story" was still not widely known at the time Jamal recorded it, as it had mostly appeared on a few bootlegs. His interpretation is a little too rushed in places, though the overall feeling is enjoyable. The one original of the date is the pianist's "The Quest for Light," a funky strutting work. Sometimes Jamal's tendency to insert quotes becomes a bit distracting, such as his sudden ill-fitting insertion of a lick from Oliver Nelson's "Stolen Moments" into Johnny Mandel's "A Time for Love." He romps through the Latin-flavored "Serenata" with ease. Jamal has always been a ballad master and his medley of "You're My Everything" and "A Certain Smile" reinforces that claim. Curtis Mayfield's "Pusher Man" adds a more poppish touch to the set, but it works. Jamal wraps the evening up with a treatment of "Dreamsville" that is both lush and tense."

== Track listing ==
1. "Effendi" (McCoy Tyner) 7:56
2. "Your Story" (Bill Evans) 6:20
3. "The Quest For Light" (Ahmad Jamal) 8:34
4. "A Time For Love" (Johnny Mandel, Paul Francis Webster) 5:10
5. "Serenata" (Leroy Anderson, Mitchell Parish) 5:02
6. "You're My Everything" (Harry Warren, Mort Dixon, Joe Young) 5:04
7. "A Certain Smile" (Sammy Fain, Webster) 4:08
8. "Pusher Man" (Curtis Mayfield) 5:32
9. "Dreamsville" (Henry Mancini)" 6:38

== Personnel ==
- Ahmad Jamal – piano
- James Cammack – double bass
- David Bowler – drums
- Seldon Newton – percussion
