= Live at Blues Alley =

Live at Blues Alley may refer to any of the following live albums recorded at the Blues Alley night club in Washington, D.C.

- Live at Blues Alley (Wynton Marsalis album), 1988
- Live at Blues Alley (Eva Cassidy album), 1996
- Live! At Blues Alley, a 1992 album by Ahmad Jamal
- Undeniable: Live at Blues Alley, a 2011 album by Pat Martino
- Live at Blues Alley, a 2005 three-album set by Hod O'Brien
- Live! At Blues Alley, a 1991 album by Dizzy Gillespie
