= Naked City Theme =

Live album by Ahmad Jamal
- Released: 1965
- Recorded: June 26–28, 1964
- Venue: The Jazz Workshop, San Francisco
- Genre: Jazz
- Length: 39:31
- Label: Argo; LPS-733

Ahmad Jamal chronology
Poinciana (1963)	Naked City Theme (1965)	The Roar of the Greasepaint (1965)

Professional ratings
Review scores
Source	Rating
Allmusic	2/5 stars

Naked City Theme is a live album by American jazz pianist Ahmad Jamal featuring performances recorded at the Jazz Workshop in 1964 and released on the Argo label.

== Background ==
This is Jamal's first recording with bassist Jamil Nasser, who would remain with the pianist's trio until 1972. He replaced Israel Crosby, who had died of a heart attack in 1962. The drummer is Chuck Lampkin, who soon left jazz to become a broadcaster. This was Jamal's first new trio album in more than two years, following the end of his "celebrated" and influential Crosby-Vernel Fournier trio.

The album's title track is a theme composed by jazz arranger-composer Billy May for the TV series Naked City, inspired by the classic 1948 film noir of the same title.

In 2008, the original LP was remastered and issued with Jamal's 1965 album Extensions as a twofer CD (JAZZBEAT 536). This compilation was reissued in a limited edition by American Jazz Classics in 2021.

== Critical reception ==
AllMusic awarded the album only 2 stars but stated, "Jamal's distinctive chord voicings and use of space and dynamics remained his trademark. Worth searching for."

== Track listing ==
All compositions by Ahamad Jamal unless noted.

1. "Naked City Theme" (Billy May, Milt Raskin) 5:09
2. "Minor Moods" – 7:21
3. "Haitian Market Place" (Richard Evans) – 7:09
4. "Beautiful Love" (Victor Young, Wayne King) – 3:40
5. "One For Miles" – 9:00
6. "Lollipops and Roses" (Tony Velona) – 7:12

== Personnel ==
- Ahmad Jamal – piano
- Jamil Nasser (aka "Jamil Sulieman") – bass
- Chuck Lampkin – drums
- Reice Hamel – Recording Engineer
