= Peace at Last =

Peace at Last may refer to:

== Albums ==
- Peace at Last (The Blue Nile album), 1996
- Peace at Last, an album by Mark Read, 2009
- Peace at Last, an EP by Hem, 2007

== Songs ==
- "Peace at Last", an instrumental by Ahmad Jamal from Ahmad Jamal '73, 1973
- "Peace, At Last", a song by Chaz Jankel from Chas Jankel, 1980
- "Peace at Last", a song by Radio Silence, 2011
- "Peace at Last", a song by Rick Wakeman from Lisztomania, 1975

== Other uses ==
- Peace at Last, a 1980 children's book by Jill Murphy
- Peace at Last? The Impact of the Good Friday Agreement on Northern Ireland, a 2003 book edited by Jörg Neuheiser and Stefan Wolff
- Peace... at Last, an illustration by Rodney Matthews used as the cover art for the 1993 Magnum album Archive
- "Peace at Last", an episode of the History Channel miniseries The World Wars
