= Nature: The Essence Part Three =

Studio album by Ahmad Jamal
- Released: 1998
- Recorded: July 23–25, 1997
- Studio: Studio La Buissonne, Pernes-les-Fontaines, France
- Genre: Jazz
- Length: 50:44
- Label: Birdology 3984-23105-2

Ahmad Jamal chronology
Live in Paris (1996)	Nature: The Essence Part Three (1998)	Ahmad Jamal with The Assai Quartet (1998)

Professional ratings
Review scores
Source	Rating
AllMusic	4/5 stars
The Penguin Guide to Jazz Recordings	3.5/4 stars

Nature: The Essence Part Three is an album by the American jazz pianist Ahmad Jamal, recorded in France in 1997 and released on the Birdology label.

== Critical reception ==
Richard S. Ginell, in his review for AllMusic, states: "Still pursuing his own muse, Jamal is up to his usual tricks with his hypnotic vamps and feverish runs, as ever refusing to toe the line and sound like everyone else".

== Track listing ==
All compositions by Ahmad Jamal unless noted.

1. "If I Find You Again" [Quartet] – 7:52
2. "Like Someone in Love" (Johnny Burke, Jimmy Van Heusen) – 6:47
3. "Chaperon" – 2:46
4. "Devil's in My Den" – 4:59
5. "And We Were Lovers" (Jerry Goldsmith) – 3:25
6. "Fantastic Vehicle" [Abridged Version] (Joe Kennedy, Jr.) – 4:40
7. "The End of a Love Affair" [Abridged Version] (Edward Redding) – 6:57
8. "Cabin in the Sky" [Medley] (Harold Arlen, Vernon Duke) – 8:50
9. "If I Find You Again" [Duet] – 4:46

== Personnel ==
- Ahmad Jamal – piano
- Othello Molineaux – steel drum
- James Cammack – bass
- Idris Muhammad – drums
- Manolo Badrena – percussion
- Stanley Turrentine – tenor saxophone (track 4)
