= Calvin Newborn =

American jazz guitarist (1933–2018)

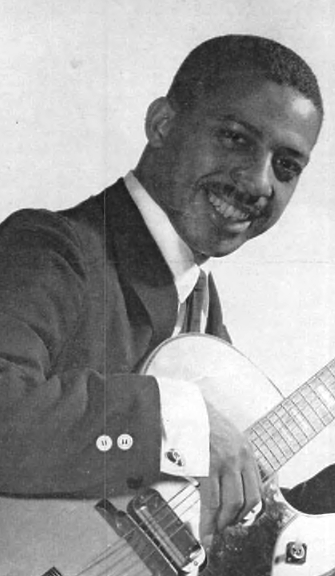
- Newborn in a 1961 DownBeat advertisement

Background information
- Birth name: Edwin Calvin Newborn
- Born: April 27, 1933; Whiteville, Tennessee, U.S.
- Died: December 1, 2018 (aged 85); Jacksonville, Florida
- Genres: Jazz
- Occupation: Musician
- Instrument: Guitar
- Years active: 1953–2018
- Labels: Yellow Dog
- Website: www.calvinnewborn.bandcamp.com

Edwin Calvin Newborn (April 27, 1933 – December 1, 2018) was an American jazz guitarist.

== Career ==
He was the brother of pianist Phineas Newborn Jr. (1931–89), with whom he recorded between 1953 and 1958. They also formed an R&B band, with their father Phineas Newborn Sr. on drums and Tuff Green on bass. The group also included Willie Mitchell and Ben Branch.

The group was the house band at the Plantation Inn Club in West Memphis, Arkansas, from 1947 until 1951. The group recorded as B. B. King's band on his first recordings in 1949, and also the Sun Records sessions in 1950.

Newborn gave guitar lessons to Howlin' Wolf and was friends with Elvis Presley, who frequented his gig at the Plantation Inn Club two nights a week. Presley also used to eat at the Newborns' house and browse their music store for gospel records.

The group left West Memphis in 1951 to tour with Jackie Brenston as the "Delta Cats" in support of the record "Rocket 88". It was considered by many to be the first rock and roll record ever recorded, and was the first Billboard number one record for Chess Records.

Following this he played with Earl Hines starting in 1959. In the early 1960s, he toured with Lionel Hampton, Jimmy Forrest, Wild Bill Davis, Al Grey, and Freddie Roach, along with fellow Memphis jazz players including Booker Little, George Coleman. Frank Strozier, and Louis Smith. Newborn also worked with Ray Charles, Count Basie, Hank Crawford and David "Fathead" Newman. Since the 1970s Newborn had remained mostly in Memphis, Tennessee, where he played regularly in local clubs well into the 1990s. His 1980 album Centerpiece hit No. 35 on the U.S. Billboard jazz albums chart, but much of his earlier material was not reissued on CD until 2005. He lived most recently in Jacksonville, Florida, and continued to perform throughout Northeast Florida until his death.

According to family members, Calvin Newborn died in Jacksonville on December 1, 2018, aged 85.

== Discography ==
=== As leader ===
- Centerpiece with Hank Crawford (Buddah, 1980)
- From the Hip (Rooster [later known as 'Rooster Blues'], 1983)
- Up City! (Omnivarious Music, 1998; reissue: Yellow Dog, 2005)
- New Born (Yellow Dog, 2005)
- Clazz (Classical Jazz) with Kenny Levine (Omnifarious, 2011)

=== As sideman ===
With Phineas Newborn Jr.

- Here Is Phineas (Atlantic, 1956)
- Phineas' Rainbow (RCA Victor, 1957)
- While My Lady Sleeps (RCA Victor, 1957)
- Fabulous Phineas (RCA Victor, 1958)
- A World of Piano! (Contemporary, 1962)

With others

- Hank Crawford, Midnight Ramble (Milestone, 1983)
- Lou Donaldson, Lou Donaldson at His Best (Cadet, 1967)
- Lou Donaldson, Ha' Mercy (Cadet, 1971)
- Jimmy Forrest, Sit Down and Relax with Jimmy Forrest (Prestige, 1961)
- Jimmy Forrest, Soul Street (New Jazz, 1964)
- Al Grey, Having a Ball (Argo, 1963)
- Lionel Hampton, The Many Sides of Hamp (Glad-Hamp, 1961)
- Earl Hines, Earl's Pearls (MGM, 1960)
- Linda Hopkins, How Blue Can You Get (Palo Alto, 1986)
- Howlin' Wolf, Sings the Blues (Crown, 1962; reissue: Ace, 2004)
- Bobby Hutcherson, The Al Grey & Dave Burns Sessions (Lone Hill Jazz, 2004)
- B.B. King, King of the Blues (MCA, 1992)
- Booker Little, Booker Little 4 & Max Roach (United Artists, 1959)
- Freddie Roach, All That's Good (Blue Note, 1965)
- Sun Ra, Secrets of the Sun (El Saturn, 1965)
- Jimmy Witherspoon, Midnight Lady Called the Blues (Muse, 1986)
