= Afternoon in Paris =

1949 jazz standard written by John Lewis

"Afternoon in Paris" is a 1949 jazz standard. It was written by John Lewis.

"Afternoon in Paris" has a 32-bar AABA form and is usually played in the key of C major. In several of the song's phrases, the tonal center changes (when played in C, there is a shift to B♭ and A♭), defining a complex harmonic structure that is of interest to both theoreticians and soloists.

== Notable recordings ==
- Phineas Newborn Quartet, Here Is Phineas (Atlantic, May 1956)
- John Lewis and Sacha Distel, Afternoon in Paris (Atlantic, 1957)
- Benny Golson Quintet, Benny Golson and the Philadelphians (United Artists, 1958)
- Sonny Rollins and Co., Now's the Time (RCA Victor, 1964)

== See also ==
- List of jazz standards
