= Phineas' Rainbow =

Studio album by Phineas Newborn Jr.
- Released: February 1957
- Recorded: October 16, 19 & 22, 1956; New York City
- Genre: Jazz
- Length: 46:26
- Label: RCA Victor LPM 1421

Phineas Newborn Jr. chronology
Here Is Phineas (1956)	Phineas' Rainbow (1957)	While My Lady Sleeps (1957)

Phineas' Rainbow is the second album by the American jazz pianist Phineas Newborn Jr. recorded in 1956 and released on the RCA Victor label in February 1957.

== Reception ==
The Allmusic review awarded the album 4 stars.

Professional ratings
Review scores
Source	Rating
Allmusic	4/5 stars

== Track listing ==
All compositions by Phineas Newborn Jr. except as indicated

1. "Overtime" – 3:45
2. "Angel Eyes" (Earl Brent, Matt Dennis) – 4:19
3. "Come to Baby, Do!" (Inez James, Sidney Miller) – 4:09
4. "Stairway to the Stars" (Matty Malneck, Mitchell Parish, Frank Signorelli) – 5:22
5. "Land's End" (Harold Land) – 5:21
6. "Clarisse" – 4:37
7. "She (She Means Everything to Me)" (George Shearing) – 4:22
8. "Tin Tin Deo" (Gil Fuller, Dizzy Gillespie, Chano Pozo) – 4:20
9. "Autumn in New York" (Vernon Duke) – 4:02
10. "What Is This Thing Called Love?" (Cole Porter) – 6:09

== Personnel ==
- Phineas Newborn Jr. – piano
- Calvin Newborn – guitar (tracks 1, 3, 5, 6, 8 & 10)
- George Joyner – bass (tracks 1, 3, 5, 6, 8 & 10)
- Philly Joe Jones – drums (tracks 1, 6 & 10)
