= Ben Branch =

American entrepreneur, jazz saxophonist, and bandleader (1928–1987)

- Born: January 8, 1928
- Died: August 27, 1987 (aged 59) Chicago, Illinois, U.S.
- Genres: Jazz
- Occupation: Musician
- Instrument: Saxophone

Ben F. Branch (January 8, 1928 – August 27, 1987) was an American entrepreneur, jazz tenor saxophonist, and bandleader.

Although known as the last person Martin Luther King Jr. spoke to moments before his assassination in 1968, Branch had been a jazz bandleader for many years.

== Musical career ==
With his brother, Thomas, on trumpet, Branch was a member of the horn section on B.B. King's first recordings for Bullet Records in 1949. "My very first recordings were for a company out of Nashville called Bullet, the Bullet Record Transcription company," King recalls. "I had horns that very first session. I had Phineas Newborn on piano; his father played drums, and his brother, Calvin, played guitar with me. I had Tuff Green on bass, Ben Branch on tenor sax, his brother, Thomas Branch, on trumpet, and a lady trombone player."

Branch recorded with King again on an early 1952 Memphis recording with the B.B. King Orchestra with, among others, Hank Crawford and Ike Turner.

For much of the 1950s, Branch was the bandleader for the house band, the Largos, at Curry's Club in North Memphis, which provided a young Isaac Hayes with his first professional gigs.

Future M.G.'s bassist Donald "Duck" Dunn was the first white member of Branch's big band, in the early 1960s.

In 1982, Branch founded the American Music Hall of Fame, a private music school in Chicago.

A few months before his death, Branch appeared with his band at the 1987 Chicago Blues Festival backing Rosco Gordon.

Branch also recorded with Brother Jack McDuff and Etta James, Little Milton, and Phil Upchurch.

Branch held a degree in music from Tennessee State University.

== Business career ==
Branch was president of Doctor Branch Products Inc., founded in 1983, in Chicago, Illinois, the nation's only black-owned soft-drink manufacturing company. The company eventually signed a $355 million agreement with Kemmerer Bottling Group, bottler of several well-known soft drinks, including 7Up, to distribute the Doctor Branch Products beverages.

== Operation Breadbasket ==
As musical director for the SCLC's Operation Breadbasket, he led the Breadbasket Orchestra and Choir that performed benefits for Dr. Martin Luther King Jr. and Operation/PUSH.

On 4 April, 1968, the evening of King's assassination, he was speaking to Branch about music for an event later that night. Jesse Jackson reported that King's last words, spoken to Branch, were "Ben, make sure you play 'Take My Hand, Precious Lord' in the meeting tonight. Play it real pretty."

Cannonball Adderley, in the introduction to the title track of his 1969 album Country Preacher, makes a specific mention of Branch in recognition of his work as leader of the Operation Breadbasket Orchestra and Choir.

While musical director of the Breadbasket Orchestra and Operation/PUSH, he arranged for gospel singer Deleon Richards to perform at the Chicago Stadium (later the United Center).

== Discography ==
- 1964: "Beach Bash"/"Bush Bash" - The Mar-Keys - Wayne Jackson (tp), Ben Branch (ts), Floyd Newman (bars), Booker T. Jones (org), Steve Cropper (g), Donald "Duck" Dunn (el-b), Al Jackson Jr. (d) (Stax 45-156)
- 1968: The Last Request - Operation Breadbasket Orchestra and Choir (Chess)
- 1969: Gin and Orange – Brother Jack McDuff
