= Crystal (Ahmad Jamal album) =

Studio album by Ahmad Jamal
- Released: 1987
- Recorded: 1987
- Studios: Normandy Sound, Warren, Rhode Island
- Genre: Jazz
- Length: 44:22
- Label: Atlantic 781 793-1
- Producers: Ahmad Jamal and Laura Hess-Hay

Ahmad Jamal chronology
Rossiter Road (1986)	Crystal (1987)	Pittsburgh (1989)

Crystal is an album by American jazz pianist Ahmad Jamal featuring performances recorded in 1987 and released on the Atlantic label.

== Critical reception ==
Professional ratings
Review scores
Source	Rating
Allmusic	3.5/5 stars

In an Allmusic review, Scott Yanow states "There are some magical moments on this quartet set... Jamal's control of dynamics and inventive use of space proved to be as effective as it had been when he first made his mark in the 1950s, although his chord voicings and general style had evolved. Jamal and his group perform ten of his originals with taste, swing and subtle surprises".

== Track listing ==
All compositions by Ahmad Jamal

1. "Quest for Light" – 4:48
2. "Arabesque" – 4:48
3. "Avo" – 7:04
4. "Piano Solo" – 1:57
5. "For My Daughter" – 3:34
6. "Perugia" – 3:57
7. "The Last Day" – 6:00
8. "Crystal" – 4:58
9. "Swahililand" – 4:08
10. "The Canteen" – 3:08

== Personnel ==
- Ahmad Jamal – piano
- James Cammack – bass
- David Bowler – drums
- Willie White – percussion
