= Pittsburgh (album) =

Studio album by Ahmad Jamal
- Released: 1989
- Recorded: 1989
- Studio: Universal, Chicago
- Genre: Jazz
- Length: 52:01
- Label: Atlantic 82029-1
- Producer: Ahmad Jamal, Richard Evans

Ahmad Jamal chronology
Crystal (1987)	Pittsburgh (1989)	Live in Paris 1992 (1992)

Pittsburgh is an album by the American jazz pianist Ahmad Jamal. It was recorded in 1989 and released on the Atlantic label. It is a tribute to Jamal's hometown. The album was recorded in Chicago.

== Critical reception ==
Professional ratings
Review scores
Source	Rating
AllMusic	4/5 stars
Chicago Sun-Times	2/4 stars
Orlando Sentinel	5/5 stars

The Sun-Sentinel wrote that, "where 'Cycles' runs right to the edge of being free jazz with its lack of structure, the next tune, 'Fly Away', is built on a straight-ahead, no- frills melody complete with a chorus line." The Orlando Sentinel determined that "Jamal does on Pittsburgh what he does best—experimenting with musical phrasing and cadence." The Omaha World-Herald concluded that "the tunes and arrangements also are done well, yet the result is merely pretty, lightweight stuff."

The AllMusic review stated: "This CD has captured both the character and the shaping hand of Jamal and the distinct sound of Evans, and they are a perfect match in this at-times-exquisite piece of work."

== Track listing ==
All compositions by Ahmad Jamal unless noted.

1. "Pittsburgh" – 7:03
2. "Bellows" – 8:50
3. "Mellowdrama" (Jimmy Heath) – 6:38
4. "Foolish Ways" – 3:35
5. "Divertimento" – 5:18
6. "Cycles" – 8:08
7. "Fly Away" – 7:25
8. "Apple Avenue" – 5:33

== Personnel ==
- Ahmad Jamal – piano
- James Cammack – bass
- David Bowler – drums
- Richard Evans – arranger
