= Back Home (Phineas Newborn Jr. album) =

Studio album by Phineas Newborn Jr.
- Released: 1985
- Recorded: September 17–18, 1976
- Studio: Contemporary Records Studio, Hollywood, CA
- Genre: Jazz
- Length: 39:02
- Label: Contemporary S7648
- Producer: Lester Koenig

Phineas Newborn Jr. chronology
Solo (1976)	Back Home (1985)	Look Out – Phineas Is Back! (1976)

Back Home is an album by American jazz pianist Phineas Newborn Jr. recorded in 1976 but not released on the Contemporary label until 1985.

== Reception ==
The Allmusic review by Scott Yanow states "the brilliant but ill pianist is reunited with the rhythm team that he had recorded with in 1969. Actually, despite his health problems, Newborn was always superlative on records, and his playing on five straight-ahead standards (including "No Moon at All" and "Love for Sale") and three of his originals is excellent".

Professional ratings
Review scores
Source	Rating
Allmusic	4/5 stars
The Penguin Guide to Jazz Recordings	3/4 stars

== Track listing ==
All compositions by Phineas Newborn Jr. except as indicated

1. "Sugar Ray" – 3:43
2. "Ill Wind" (Harold Arlen, Ted Koehler) – 6:03
3. "Watch What Happens" (Norman Gimbel, Michel Legrand) – 5:06
4. "No Moon at All" (Redd Evans, Dave Mann) – 4:09
5. "Back Home" – 4:22
6. "On Green Dolphin Street" (Bronisław Kaper, Ned Washington) – 5:23
7. "Pamela" – 4:49
8. "Love for Sale" (Cole Porter) – 5:27

== Personnel ==
- Phineas Newborn Jr. – piano
- Ray Brown – bass
- Elvin Jones – drums
