= Steppin' Out with a Dream =

Studio album by Ahmad Jamal
- Released: 1976
- Recorded: 1976
- Studio: The Village Recorder, Los Angeles, California
- Genre: Jazz
- Length: 43:21
- Label: 20th Century STEC249/T-515
- Producer: Ahmad Jamal under the supervision of Paul Gayten

Ahmad Jamal chronology
Genetic Walk (1975)	Steppin' Out with a Dream (1976)	Live at Oil Can Harry's, Recorded Live at Oil Can Harry's (1976)

Professional ratings
Review scores
Source	Rating

Steppin' Out with a Dream is an album by American jazz pianist Ahmad Jamal recorded in 1976 and released on the 20th Century label.

== Track listing ==
All compositions by Ahmad Jamal unless noted.

Side one

1. "Handicapper" – 7:37
2. "Prelude to a Kiss" (Irving Gordon, Irving Mills, Duke Ellington) – 7:50
3. "My One and Only Love" (Robert Mellin, Guy Wood) – 8:48

Side two

1. "Tucson" – 9:10
2. "Crossfire" – 9:56

== Personnel ==
- Ahmad Jamal – piano, electric piano
- Calvin Keys – guitar
- John Heard (listed on LP as "Hurd") – bass
- Frank Gant – drums
- Selden Newton – percussion instruments
- Neil Brody – engineer
- Michael Paladin – album photography
- Jamico – album art direction
- Michael Levy – album cover and liner design
- Trici Venola – illustration
