= Fabulous Phineas =

Studio album by Phineas Newborn Jr.
- Released: 1958
- Recorded: March 28 & April 3, 1958; New York City
- Genre: Jazz
- Label: RCA Victor LPM 1873

Phineas Newborn Jr. chronology
| Phineas Newborn Jr. Plays Harold Arlen's Music from Jamaica (1957) | Fabulous Phineas (1958) | Phineas Newborn Plays Again! (1958) |

Fabulous Phineas is an album by American jazz pianist Phineas Newborn Jr. recorded in 1958 and released on the RCA Victor label.

== Reception ==
The Allmusic review awarded the album 3 stars.

Professional ratings
Review scores
| Source | Rating |
|---|---|
| Allmusic | 3/5 stars |

== Track listing ==
All compositions by Phineas Newborn Jr. except as indicated

1. "Sweet Lorraine" (Cliff Burwell, Mitchell Parish) – 4:30
2. "What's New?" (Johnny Burke, Bob Haggart) – 4:05
3. "Pamela" – 4:40
4. "45° Angle" (Denzil Best) – 5:51
5. "No Moon at All" (Redd Evans, Dave Mann) – 4:34
6. "I'll Remember April" (Gene DePaul, Patricia Johnston, Don Raye) – 7:41
7. "Cherokee" (Ray Noble) – 4:50
8. "Back Home" – 5:18

== Personnel ==
- Phineas Newborn Jr. – piano
- Calvin Newborn – guitar (tracks 1, 3–6 & 8)
- George Joyner – bass (tracks 1, 3–6 & 8)
- Denzil Best – drums (tracks 1, 3–6 & 8)
