= Freeflight (album) =

Live album by Ahmad Jamal
- Released: 1971
- Recorded: June 17, 1971
- Genre: Jazz
- Length: 38.39
- Label: Impulse!
- Producer: Ed Michel

Ahmad Jamal chronology
The Awakening (1970)	Freeflight (1971)	Outertimeinnerspace (1971)

Freeflight is a live album by American jazz pianist Ahmad Jamal featuring performances recorded at the Montreux Jazz Festival in 1971 for the Impulse! label. Additional performances from this concert were released as Outertimeinnerspace in 1972. It was also the first album to have Jamal play electric piano. The Rhodes piano was given to him by somebody living in Switzerland, and Jamal said he would continue to play the instrument in the future as well as his standard acoustic piano.

== Critical reception ==
The AllMusic review by Scott Yanow called it "one of pianist Ahmad Jamal's finest recordings of the early '70s... An excellent effort".

Professional ratings
Review scores
Source	Rating
AllMusic	4.5/5 stars
The Rolling Stone Jazz Record Guide	3/5 stars

== Track listing ==
All compositions by Ahmad Jamal except as indicated

1. Introduction – 0:53
2. "Effendi" (McCoy Tyner) – 11:27
3. "Dolphin Dance" (Herbie Hancock) – 4:51
4. "Manhattan Reflections" – 10:00
5. "Poinciana" (Buddy Bernier, Nat Simon) – 11:28
- Recorded at the Montreux Jazz Festival in the Casino De Montreux in Switzerland on June 17, 1971

== Personnel ==
- Ahmad Jamal – piano, electric piano
- Jamil Nasser – bass
- Frank Gant – drums
