= The Newborn Touch =

Studio album by Phineas Newborn Jr.
- Released: 1966
- Recorded: April 1, 1964; Contemporary Records Studio, Hollywood, CA
- Genre: Jazz
- Length: 39:34
- Label: Contemporary C3615/S7615
- Producer: Lester Koenig

Phineas Newborn Jr. chronology
The Great Jazz Piano of Phineas Newborn Jr. (1962)	The Newborn Touch (1966)	Please Send Me Someone to Love (1969)

The Newborn Touch is an album by American jazz pianist Phineas Newborn Jr. recorded in 1964 and released on the Contemporary label.

== Reception ==
The Allmusic review by Scott Yanow states "Phineas Newborn's only recording of the 1963-1968 period, the trio outing with bassist Leroy Vinnegar and drummer Frank Butler, finds Newborn's virtuosic style unchanged from the late '50s... Newborn's remarkable control of the piano was still unimpaired".

Professional ratings
Review scores
Source	Rating
Allmusic	4.5/5 stars
The Penguin Guide to Jazz Recordings	3.5/4 stars

== Track listing ==
1. "A Walkin' Thing" (Benny Carter) – 4:37
2. "Double Play" (Russ Freeman) – 3:59
3. "The Sermon" (Hampton Hawes) – 2:40
4. "Diane" (Art Pepper) – 4:17
5. "The Blessing" (Ornette Coleman) – 3:08
6. "Grooveyard" (Carl Perkins) – 3:07
7. "Blue Daniel" (Frank Rosolino) – 3:18
8. "Hard to Find" (Leroy Vinnegar) – 4:04
9. "Pazmuerte" (Jimmy Woods) – 3:30
10. "Be Deedle Dee Do" (Barney Kessel) – 4:04
11. "Good Lil' Man" (Marvin Jenkins) – 3:10 Bonus track on CD reissue
12. "Be Deedle Dee Do" [alternate take] (Kessel) – 4:50 Bonus track on CD reissue

== Force ==
- Phineas Newborn Jr. – piano
- Leroy Vinnegar – bass
- Frank Butler – drums
