= Jamalca (album) =

Studio album by Ahmad Jamal
- Released: 1974
- Recorded: 1974
- Genre: Jazz
- Length: 41:47
- Label: 20th Century T-432
- Producer: Ahmad Jamal and Richard Evans

Ahmad Jamal chronology
| Ahmad Jamal '73 (1973) | Jamalca (1974) | Jamal Plays Jamal (1974) |

Professional ratings
Review scores
| Source | Rating |
|---|---|
| Allmusic | 3/5 stars |

Jamalca is an album by American jazz pianist Ahmad Jamal featuring performances recorded in 1974 and released on the 20th Century label.

== Critical reception ==
Allmusic awarded the album 3 stars stating "This is essentially a crossover album, and while it is dated, it is still enjoyable in spots... At this point, the potential audience for this album will consist more of crate-digging rare groove enthusiasts than straight-ahead jazz fans".

== Track listing ==
1. "Ghetto Child" (Thom Bell, Linda Creed) – 5:37
2. "Misdemeanor" (Leon Sylvers III) – 4:30
3. "Somewhere Along The Nile" (Richard Evans, Ra Twani Az Yemeni) 4:46
4. "Trouble Man" (Marvin Gaye) – 5:11
5. "Jamalca" (Ahmad Jamal) – 3:54
6. "Don't Misunderstand" (Gordon Parks) – 4:07
7. "Theme Bahamas" (Brian Grice) – 6:09
8. "Children Calling" (Joel Beale) – 4:45
9. "Theme from M*A*S*H (Suicide Is Painless)" (Mike Altman, Johnny Mandel) – 2:48

== Personnel ==
- Ahmad Jamal – piano
- Orchestra arranged and conducted by Richard Evans
- Bass – Richard Evans, Jamil Nasser (track 9)
- Drums – Brian Grice, Frank Gant (track 9)
- Engineer – Paul Serrano
- Vocals – Charles Colbert, Jimmy Spink, Marilyn Haywood, Morra Stewart, Vivian Haywood (Harreel)
