= Here Is Phineas =

Studio album by Phineas Newborn Jr.
- Released: August 1956
- Recorded: May 3 & 4, 1956
- Studios: Van Gelder Studio, Hackensack, NJ
- Genre: Jazz
- Length: 36:14
- Label: Atlantic LP 1235
- Producer: Nesuhi Ertegun

Phineas Newborn Jr. chronology
Here Is Phineas (1956)	Phineas' Rainbow (1957)

Here Is Phineas (subtitled The Piano Artistry of Phineas Newborn Jr.) is the debut album by the American jazz pianist Phineas Newborn Jr. recorded in May 1956 and released on the Atlantic label in August 1956.

== Reception ==
The Allmusic review by Scott Yanow states "some listeners may shake their heads at his constant outpouring of technically impossible runs (those speedy octaves are ridiculous) – but if one has chops on this level, one should feel free to display them. This is a dazzling debut from an ill-fated but classic pianist". Reviewing the reissued album for JazzTimes, Miles Jordan wrote "Praised in some quarters for his 'fabulous technique' and damned in others for his 'lack of feeling,' Phineas (say 'Finus') Newborn, Jr. burst onto the NYC scene from Memphis like a sky rocket".

Professional ratings
Review scores
Source	Rating
Allmusic	5/5 stars
The Penguin Guide to Jazz Recordings	3/4 stars

== Track listing ==
1. "Barbados" (Charlie Parker) – 4:01
2. "All the Things You Are" (Oscar Hammerstein II, Jerome Kern) – 7:22
3. "The More I See You" (Mack Gordon, Harry Warren) – 4:01
4. "Celia" (Bud Powell) – 3:06
5. "Daahoud" (Clifford Brown) – 3:34
6. "Newport Blues" (Phineas Newborn Jr.) – 4:32
7. "I'm Beginning to See the Light" (Duke Ellington, Don George, Johnny Hodges, Harry James) – 3:05
8. "Afternoon in Paris" (John Lewis) – 6:45

== Personnel ==
- Phineas Newborn Jr. – piano
- Calvin Newborn – guitar (tracks 1, 2, 5 & 8)
- Oscar Pettiford – bass (tracks 1, 2, 4, 5, 7 & 8)
- Kenny Clarke – drums (tracks 1, 2, 4, 5, 7 & 8)
