= Big Byrd: The Essence Part 2 =

Studio album by Ahmad Jamal
- Released: 1996
- Recorded: October 30–31, 1994 and February 6–7, 1995
- Studio: Studio Marcadet, La Plaine Saint Denis, France and Clinton Recording Studios, New York City
- Genre: Jazz
- Length: 57:31
- Label: Birdology 529447-2

Ahmad Jamal chronology
The Essence Part One (1995)	Big Byrd: The Essence Part 2 (1996)	Live in Paris 1996 (1996)

Professional ratings
Review scores
Source	Rating
AllMusic	3.5/5 stars
The Penguin Guide to Jazz Recordings	3/4 stars

Big Byrd: The Essence Part 2 is an album by the American jazz pianist Ahmad Jamal, containing performances recorded in Paris in 1994 and New York in 1995 and released on the Birdology label.

== Critical reception ==
Richard S. Ginell, in his review for AllMusic, stated: "Into his mid-60s, Jamal remained as distinctive and inventive a pianist as ever, with delightful surprises lurking around every bend".

== Track listing ==
All compositions by Ahmad Jamal unless noted.

1. "Lament" – 8:59
2. "There's a Lull in My Life" (Mack Gordon, Harry Revel) – 6:38
3. "Manhattan Reflections" – 8:35
4. "Big Byrd" – 15:13
5. "Jamie My Boy" – 9:36
6. "I Love You" (Cole Porter) – 8:30

== Personnel ==
- Ahmad Jamal – piano
- James Cammack – bass (tracks 1, 2, 5 & 6)
- Jamil Nasser – bass (tracks 3 & 4)
- Idris Muhammad – drums
- Manolo Badrena – percussion
- Joe Kennedy, Jr. – violin (track 3)
- Donald Byrd – trumpet (track 4)
