= I Remember Duke, Hoagy & Strayhorn =

Studio album by Ahmad Jamal
- Released: 1995
- Recorded: June 2–3, 1994
- Studio: Clinton, New York City
- Genre: Jazz
- Length: 62:34
- Label: Telarc CD-83339

Ahmad Jamal chronology
Chicago Revisited (1993)	I Remember Duke, Hoagy & Strayhorn (1995)	The Essence Part One (1995)

I Remember Duke, Hoagy & Strayhorn is an album by American jazz pianist Ahmad Jamal featuring performances recorded in 1994 and released on the Telarc label.

== Critical reception ==
Professional ratings
Review scores
Source	Rating
AllMusic	4/5 stars
The Penguin Guide to Jazz Recordings	3.5/4 stars

Scott Yanow, in his review for AllMusic, states that "the music is quite thoughtful and subtle, with plenty of surprising ideas and unusual turns".

In his review for the Chicago Tribune Howard Reich opined: "His most recent release, I Remember Duke, Hoagy & Strayhorn, carries a greater feeling of sentiment and nostalgia than one expects from Jamal, but considering the nature of this recording ... the tender lyricism and warm tone of the performances seem appropriate. At the same time, Jamal brings to many of these tracks a harmonic sophistication and an ability to develop material that few pianists working today could match. The intelligence with which he merges various Ellington themes in 'I Got It Bad', the startling chord changes he brings to 'In a Sentimental Mood' and the intricate way he works out themes in 'Chelsea Bridge' all recommend this disc."

== Track listing ==
All compositions by Ahmad Jamal unless noted.

1. "My Flower" – 2:33
2. "I Got It Bad" (Duke Ellington) – 5:08
3. "In a Sentimental Mood" (Ellington) – 9:21
4. "Ruby" (Heinz Roemheld) – 5:57
5. "Don't You Know I Care (Or Don't You Care to Know)" (Mack David, Ellington) – 4:45
6. "Prelude to a Kiss" (Ellington, Irving Gordon, Irving Mills) – 4:22
7. "Do Nothing till You Hear from Me (Ellington, Bob Russell) – 5:53
8. "Chelsea Bridge" (Billy Strayhorn) – 4:41
9. "I Remember Hoagy" – 4:30
10. "Skylark" (Hoagy Carmichael, Johnny Mercer) – 4:36
11. "Never Let Me Go" (Ray Evans, Jay Livingston) – 4:35
12. "Goodbye" (Stanley Cowell) – 6:08

== Personnel ==
- Ahmad Jamal – piano
- Ephriam Wolfolk – bass
- Arti Dixson – drums
