= Rhapsody (Ahmad Jamal album) =

Studio album by Ahmad Jamal
- Released: July 1966
- Recorded: December 15–17, 1965; Nola Studios, New York
- Genre: Jazz
- Length: 35:07
- Label: Cadet; LPS-764
- Producer: Ahmad Jamal and Dick LaPalm

Ahmad Jamal chronology
Extensions (1965)	Rhapsody (1966)	Heat Wave (1966)

Professional ratings
Review scores
Source	Rating
Allmusic	3/5 stars

Rhapsody is an album by American jazz pianist Ahmad Jamal featuring performances recorded in 1965 and released in 1966 on the Cadet label.

== Critical reception ==
In his review for Allmusic, Scott Yanow calls it "decent music, but not quite essential".

== Track listing ==
1. "I Hear a Rhapsody" (Dick Gasparre, George Fragos, Jack Baker) – 4:45
2. "This Could Be the Start of Something" (Steve Allen) – 3:35
3. "Then I'll Be Tired Of You" (Arthur Schwartz, E. Y. Harburg) – 3:52
4. "Effendi" (McCoy Tyner) – 4:06
5. "Invitation" (Bronisław Kaper, Paul Francis Webster) – 3:00
6. "The Shadow of Your Smile" (Johnny Mandel, Webster) – 2:58
7. "Strange" (John La Touche, Marvin Fisher) – 3:06
8. "You Can Be Sure" (Joe Kennedy) – 3:48
9. "Concern" (Ahmad Jamal) – 5:57

== Personnel ==
- Ahmad Jamal – piano, arranger
- Jamil Nasser – bass
- Vernel Fournier – drums
- Unnamed fifteen-piece orchestra of violins, violas and cellos arranged by Joe Kennedy (tracks 1, 3, 6 & 8)
