= Genetic Walk =

Studio album by Ahmad Jamal
- Released: 1980
- Recorded: 1975
- Studio: P.S., Chicago, Wally Heider, Los Angeles, and The Village Recorder, Los Angeles
- Genre: Jazz Fusion
- Length: 38:49
- Label: 20th Century T-600
- Producer: Ahmad Jamal

Ahmad Jamal chronology
Jamal Plays Jamal (1974)	Genetic Walk (1980)	Steppin' Out with a Dream (1976)

Genetic Walk is an album by American jazz pianist Ahmad Jamal featuring performances recorded in 1975 and released on the 20th Century label.

== Critical reception ==
Professional ratings
Review scores
Source	Rating
AllMusic	3/5 stars
The Rolling Stone Jazz Record Guide	2/5 stars

AllMusic awarded the album 3 stars, stating, "Last of his albums to enjoy crossover chart activity".

== Track listing ==
All compositions by Ahmad Jamal unless noted.

1. "Genetic Walk" – 6:10
2. "Spartacus Love Theme" (Alex North) – 3:45
3. "Chaser" – 3:13
4. "La Costa" (Natalie Cole, Linda Williams) – 5:47
5. "Pablo Sierra" – 4:39
6. "Bellows" – 6:45
7. "Don't Ask My Neighbors" (Skip Scarborough) – 4:16
8. "Time for Love" (Johnny Mandel, Paul Francis Webster) – 4:14

== Personnel ==
- Ahmad Jamal – keyboards
- Calvin Keys – guitar (tracks 5 & 6)
- Danny Leake – guitar (track 7)
- Richard Evans – bass (track 4, 7)
- Roger Harris – bass (track 1)
- John Heard – bass (tracks 2, & 5, 6 & 8)
- Jamil Nasser – bass (track 3)
- Steve Cobb – drums (track 4)
- Frank Gant – drums (tracks 3 & 6)
- Morris Jenkins – drums (track 1, 7)
- Eddie Marshall – drums (track 2)
- Harvey Mason – drums (track 5)
