= The Roar of the Greasepaint =

Studio album by Ahmad Jamal
- Released: 1965
- Recorded: February 24–25, 1965
- Studio: Nola Penthouse Studio, New York
- Genre: Jazz
- Length: 34:16
- Label: Argo; LPS-751
- Producer: Esmond Edwards

Ahmad Jamal chronology
Naked City Theme (1964)	The Roar of the Greasepaint (1965)	Extensions (1965)

Professional ratings
Review scores
Source	Rating
Allmusic	2/5 stars

The Roar of the Greasepaint is an album by American jazz pianist Ahmad Jamal featuring performances of tunes from the musical, The Roar of the Greasepaint – The Smell of the Crowd recorded in 1965 and released on the Argo label.

== Critical reception ==
AllMusic awarded the album 2 stars.

== Track listing ==
All compositions by Leslie Bricusse and Anthony Newley

1. "Look at That Face" 2:56
2. "Where Would You Be Without Me?" – 2:52
3. "It Isn't Enough" – 3:25
4. "Who Can I Turn To (When Nobody Needs Me)" – 2:58
5. "Sweet Beginning" – 3:11
6. "The Dream" – 2:25
7. "Feeling Good" – 2:56
8. "My First Love Song" – 4:21
9. "A Wonderful Day Like Today" – 2:39
10. "That's What It Is To Be Young" 3:31
11. "That Beautiful Land" – 3:02

== Personnel ==
- Ahmad Jamal – piano
- Jamil Nasser – bass
- Chuck Lampkin – drums
