= Outertimeinnerspace =

Live album by Ahmad Jamal
- Released: 1972
- Recorded: June 17, 1971
- Genre: Jazz
- Length: 36:35
- Label: Impulse!
- Producer: Ed Michel

Ahmad Jamal chronology
Freeflight (1971)	Outertimeinnerspace (1972)	Ahmad Jamal '73 (1973)

Outertimeinnerspace is a live album by American jazz pianist Ahmad Jamal featuring performances recorded at the Montreux Jazz Festival in 1971 for the Impulse! label. Additional performances from this concert were released as Freeflight in 1971.

== Critical reception ==
The Allmusic review by Jason Ankeny awarded the album four stars, calling it "a challenging but deeply rewarding effort that captures the pianist at his most profoundly spiritual, exploring otherworldly dimensions of space and sound".

Professional ratings
Review scores
Source	Rating
Allmusic	4/5 stars

== Track listing ==
All compositions by Ahmad Jamal unless noted.

1. "Bogota" (Richard Evans) – 17:00
2. "Extensions" – 19:35

- Recorded at the Montreux Jazz Festival in the Casino De Montreux in Switzerland on June 17, 1971

== Personnel ==
- Ahmad Jamal – piano, electric piano
- Jamil Sulieman – bass
- Frank Gant – drums
