= Tuff Green =

American jazz musician

Richard Henry "Tuff" Green (July 23, 1911 – June 19, 1966) was an American jazz and R&B bassist and bandleader.

He was born in Greenville, Mississippi, United States. After studying with Jimmie Lunceford in Memphis, Tennessee, in the late 1940s he led the Rocketeers, which featured, among others, Phineas Newborn Sr., Ben Branch, Leonard "Doughbelly" Campbell, Willie Mitchell, Hank Crawford, saxophonist Irvin Reason, trumpeter Gene "Bowlegs" Miller, trombonist Walter "Tang" Smith, saxophonist James Luper, and pianist Harry Gibson. Mose Allison, having heard them in 1947, has credited Tuff Green and His Rocketeers with playing the first "rock and roll".

As an established bandleader in Memphis, in 1951 he later put together the pickup band for B. B. King's first hit, "Three O'Clock Blues", Ben Branch and Phineas Newborn Sr., along with Newborn's sons, Phineas Jr. and Calvin, together with Ben Branch's brother Thomas, and Sammie Jett and which was recorded in Green's sitting room. A previous version of the song had been recorded in September 1951 with King backed by Richard Sanders and Adolph "Billy" Duncan on tenor saxes, Johnny Ace, Green, and Earl Forest on drums.

Bobby Bland's first recording was also made in Green's sitting room, and featured Green, Johnny Ace, Earl Forest, M.T. (Matthew) Murphy, Little Junior Parker, Ike Turner, and Rosco Gordon, whose "No More Doggin'", also recorded at Green's home, was a number 3 R&B hit.

He died in Memphis, Tennessee, in June 1966, at the age of 54.

== Discography ==
=== Album features ===
- 2000: A Shot in the Dark – Nashville Jumps (Bear Family Records)
- 2007: Bullet Records - Rhythm & Blues (Blue Label)
- 2010: Bullet Records Jump, Blues & Ballads (SPV GmbH)

=== Albums as a sideman ===
- 1977: Rosco Gordon – The Legendary Sun Performers (Charly Records)
- 2010: Ike Turner – That Kat Sure Could Play! The Singles 1951–1957 (Secret Records Limited)
- 2013: B.B. King – The Indispensable 1949–1962 (Frémeaux & Associés)
