= Ahmad Jamal with the Assai Quartet =

Live album by Ahmad Jamal
- Released: 1998
- Recorded: 1998
- Venue: Yale University
- Studio: Horizon Studios
- Genre: Jazz
- Length: 45:28
- Label: Roesch Records
- Producer: David Mills

Ahmad Jamal chronology
| Live in Paris (1996) | Ahmad Jamal with the Assai Quartet (1998) | Picture Perfect (2001) |

Ahmad Jamal with the Assai Quartet is a 1998 album by the American jazz pianist Ahmad Jamal, recorded live in concert at Yale University, with additional recording completed at Horizon Studios in New Jersey and Ahmad's home in Massachusetts.

== Critical reception ==
Frank Rubolino, in his 1999 review for Cadence Magazine, wrote: "Jamal's individualistic and ritualistic approach to time and rhythm have been his trademark...the trio has been his forte for most of his career, yet he has diverted to break new ground, as he does on this release. With the trio intact as the main element, Jamal plays his signature style with a string quartet that adds a dynamic aura to the performance. Jamal is always the focal point, running up and down the keyboard while the lower end is perpetuated in an attempt to hypnotize. When the strings enter over the trio, they temporarily wrest the compositions from his control and turn them into quasi-classical movements. Jamal then reassumes command with a seamless exit from the ensemble. The marriage of Jamal and the string quartet is a well-made match.

Jamal is in his typical contemplative and meditative mood on the solo segments, brooding over the piano as the denseness of his playing resonates through the air. The entire album is masterfully played by Jamal, a treasure who never seems to go out of style and who always exhibits class. I loved his playing in 1958 and I love it now."

== Track listing ==
1. "Temple Court" (Jamal) 10:31
2. "Comp Time" (Jamal) 5:39
3. "Feast" (Jamal) 4:17
4. "Patouche" (Jamal) 2:56
5. "A Short Piece" (Jamal) 3:37
6. Solo Improvisation: "Pots En Verre No. 1" 4:17
7. Solo Improvisation: "Pots En Verre No. 2" 3:35
8. Solo Improvisation: "Pots En Verre No. 3" 6:09
9. Solo Improvisation: "Pots En Verre No. 4" 2:39
10. "Everybody Knows" (Leonard Cohen) 3:08

== Personnel ==
- Ahmad Jamal – piano
- Epraim Wolfolk – bass
- Arti Dixson – drums

=== The Assai Quartet ===
- Jaroslaw Lis – violin
- Peter Biely – violin
- Suzanne LeFevre – viola
- Claude Giron – cello
