= Phineas Newborn Jr. Plays Harold Arlen's Music from Jamaica =

Studio album by Phineas Newborn Jr.
- Released: 1957
- Recorded: September 7, 8 & 9, 1957; New York City
- Genre: Jazz
- Label: RCA Victor LPM 1589

Phineas Newborn Jr. chronology
While My Lady Sleeps (1957)	Phineas Newborn Jr. Plays Harold Arlen's Music from Jamaica (1957)	Fabulous Phineas (1958)

Phineas Newborn Jr. Plays Harold Arlen's Music from Jamaica is an album by American jazz pianist Phineas Newborn Jr. recorded in 1957 and released on the RCA Victor label. The album features Newborn's interpretations of compositions from the Broadway musical Jamaica.

== Reception ==
The Allmusic review awarded the album 3 stars.

Professional ratings
Review scores
Source	Rating
Allmusic	3/5 stars

== Track listing ==
All compositions by Harold Arlen and Yip Harburg

1. "Savannah" – 4:10
2. "Little Biscuit" – 3:03
3. "Cocoanut Sweet" – 4:23
4. "Push de Button" – 4:23
5. "Napoleon" – 4:20
6. "Hooray for de Yankee Dollar" – 3:31
7. "For Every Fish" – 3:47
8. "Take It Slow, Joe" – 4:20
9. "Pity the Sunset" – 4:07
10. "Pretty to Walk With" – 2:52

== Personnel ==
- Phineas Newborn Jr. – piano
- Ernie Royal (tracks 2, 4 & 6–9), Nick Ferrante (tracks 1, 3, 5 & 10) – trumpet
- Jimmy Cleveland – trombone
- Jerome Richardson – tenor saxophone, flute
- Sahib Shihab – baritone saxophone, alto saxophone, clarinet, bass clarinet
- Les Spann – guitar
- George Duvivier – bass
- Osie Johnson – drums
- Francisco Pozo, Willie Rodriguez – congas, bongos, timbale
- A. K. Salim – arranger
