= John Simmons (musician) =

American jazz bassist

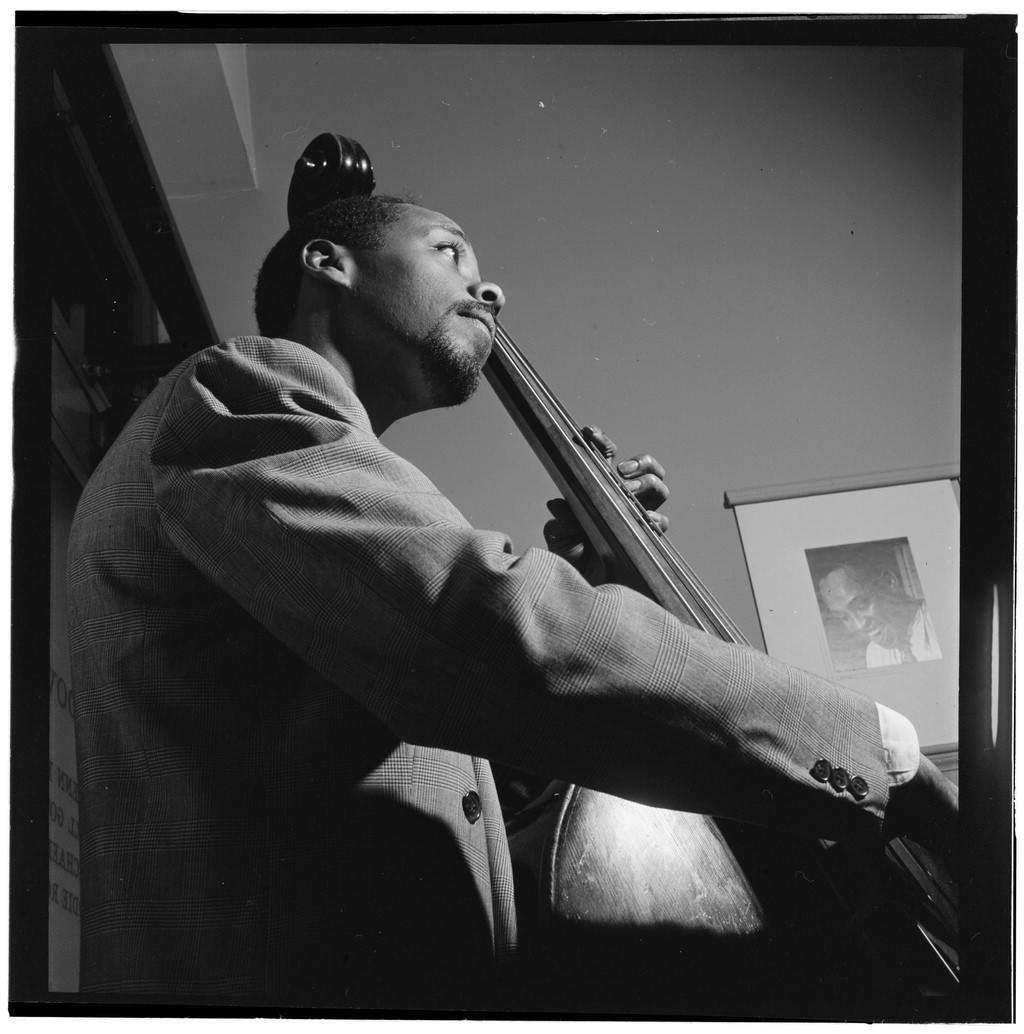
- John Simmons, ca. July 1947; Photograph by William P. Gottlieb.

Background information
- Born: June 14, 1918; Haskell, Oklahoma, U.S.
- Died: September 19, 1979 (aged 61) Orange, New York, U.S.
- Genres: Jazz
- Occupation: Musician
- Instrument: Bass
- Years active: 1937–1960

John Simmons (June 14, 1918 – September 19, 1979) was an American jazz bassist.

== Life ==
Simmons played trumpet at first, but a sports injury prevented him from continuing on the instrument. He picked up bass instead, landing his first professional gigs a mere four months after starting on the instrument. Early on he played with Nat King Cole and Teddy Wilson (1937), then moved to Chicago, Illinois, where he played with Jimmy Bell, King Kolax, Floyd Campbell, and Johnny Letman. He played with Roy Eldridge in 1940 and spent 1941-42 playing at various times with Benny Goodman, Cootie Williams, and Louis Armstrong. In 1942-43, he played in the CBS Blue Network Orchestra, then played with Duke Ellington (1943), Eddie Heywood (1945), and Illinois Jacquet (1946), in addition to doing much studio work.

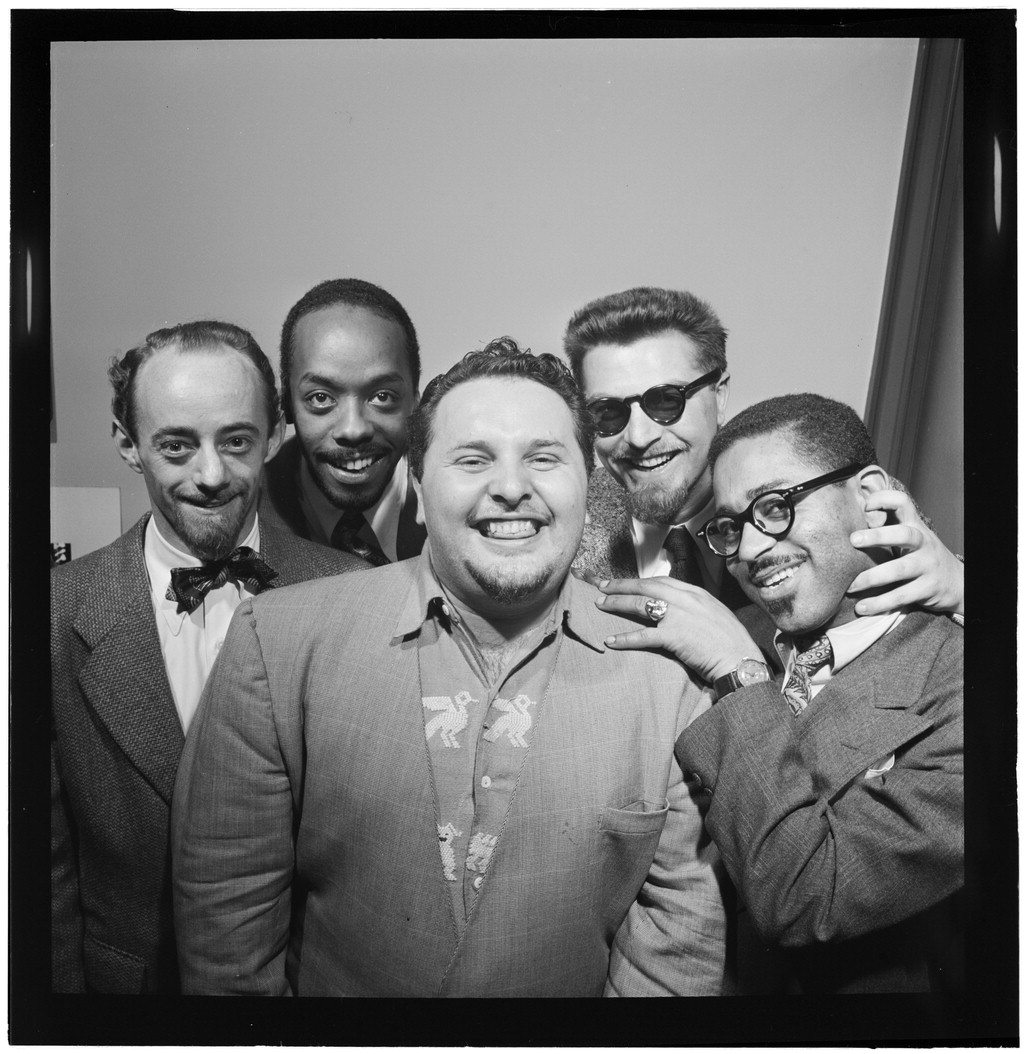
(From left:) Dave Lambert, John Simmons, Chubby Jackson, George Handy, and Dizzy Gillespie, William P. Gottlieb's office, New York, N.Y., ca. July 1947 Photograph by William P. Gottlieb

He continued to work as a studio musician for much of the 1950s, and also played with Erroll Garner (1950–52), Harry "Sweets" Edison (1955), Art Tatum (1955), and the Rolf Ericson/Duke Jordan band (1956). One of his last associations was with Phineas Newborn in 1960; ill health forced his retirement not long afterwards.

In addition to the above, Simmons also recorded with Lester Young, James P. Johnson, Hot Lips Page, Ben Webster, Billie Holiday, Tadd Dameron, Sidney DeParis, Sid Catlett, Coleman Hawkins, Don Byas, Benny Carter, Bill DeArango, Al Casey, Ella Fitzgerald, Charles Thompson, Thelonious Monk, and Erroll Garner.

He died in September 1979, at the age of 61.

He is the father of Joan Simmons, Kathleen Simmons, Addie Simmons, and NBC New York newscaster Sue Simmons.

== Discography ==
With Louis Bellson

- Skin Deep (Norgran, 1953)

With Tadd Dameron

- Fontainebleau (Prestige, 1956)
- Mating Call (Prestige, 1957)

With Roy Eldridge and Benny Carter

- Urbane Jazz (Verve, 1955)

With Maynard Ferguson

- Jam Session featuring Maynard Ferguson (EmArcy, 1954)

With Matthew Gee

- Jazz by Gee (Riverside, 1956)

With Milt Jackson

- Wizard of the Vibes (Blue Note, 1948)

With Phineas Newborn, Jr.

- Piano Portraits by Phineas Newborn (Roulette, 1959)
- I Love a Piano (Roulette, 1959)

With Buddy Rich

- Buddy and Sweets (Norgan, 1955)
- The Wailing Buddy Rich (Norgran, 1955)
