= Recorded Live at Oil Can Harry's =

Live album by Ahmad Jamal
- Released: 1976
- Recorded: August 13, 1976
- Venues: Oil Can Harry's, Vancouver
- Genre: Jazz
- Length: 47:51
- Label: Catalyst
- Producer: Ahmad Jamal

Ahmad Jamal chronology
Steppin' Out with a Dream (1976)	Recorded Live at Oil Can Harry's (1976)	One (1979)

Recorded Live at Oil Can Harry's is a live album by American jazz pianist Ahmad Jamal, featuring four pieces recorded at Oil Can Harry's, a nightclub in Vancouver, on August 13, 1976.

Performing with Jamal are Calvin Keys on guitar, John Heard on double bass, Frank Gant on drums and Seldon Newton on percussion. Catalyst Records released the album in 1976.

Michael K. Leader, president of Leader Cinema Systems, was the recording engineer for the album. He said that Canadian producer Gary Barclay was the producer of this album, not Ahmad Jamal. The Oil Can Harry’s August 8, 1975, performance was recorded live for the "Saturday All Nite Jazz Show" on Barclay's Vancouver station, CHQM-FM.

On the CD version of this concert, Jamal’s unaccompanied piano solo on the introduction of “Folklore” was severely edited. Some existing LP versions include the complete solo.

== Reception ==
Professional ratings
Review scores
Source	Rating
AllMusic	4/5 stars
The Rolling Stone Jazz Record Guide	3/5 stars

Jazz critic Scott Yanow said that the album "gives listeners an excellent example of the playing of pianist Ahmad Jamal in the mid-1970s".

== Track listing ==
No.	Title	Music	Length
1.	"Effendi"	McCoy Tyner	12:57
2.	"Poinciana"	Buddy Bernier, Nat Simon	10:25
3.	"Folklore"	Ahmad Jamal	12:57
4.	"Bellows"	Ahmad Jamal	11:32
Total length:			47:51
