= Jamal Plays Jamal =

Studio album by Ahmad Jamal
- Released: 1974
- Recorded: 1974
- Studio: Generation Sound, New York City and P.S. Recording Studios, Chicago
- Genre: Jazz
- Length: 44:27
- Label: 20th Century T-459
- Producer: Ahmad Jamal

Ahmad Jamal chronology
Jamalca (1974)	Jamal Plays Jamal (1974)	Genetic Walk (1975)

Professional ratings
Review scores
Source	Rating
Allmusic	4/5 stars

Jamal Plays Jamal is an album by American jazz pianist Ahmad Jamal featuring performances recorded in 1974 and released on the 20th Century label.

== Critical reception ==
The Allmusic review awarded the album 4 stars stating "Jamal Plays Jamal epitomizes the commercial leanings and pop textures that dominate Ahmad Jamal's mid-'70s fusion efforts for the 20th Century label. Though his funkiest and most accessible recording to date, it nevertheless retains the melodic invention and intricacy of his more conventional jazz records".

== Track listing ==
All compositions by Ahmad Jamal.

1. "Eclipse" – 7:08
2. "Pastures" – 6:40
3. "Dialogue" – 8:43
4. "Spanish Interlude" – 7:17
5. "Death and Resurrection" – 4:43
6. "Swahililand" – 9:56

== Personnel ==
- Ahmad Jamal – piano, electric piano, synthesizer
- Jamil Nasser – bass
- Frank Gant – drums
- Azzedin Weston – congas
