= I Love a Piano (album) =

Studio album by Phineas Newborn Jr.
- Released: 1960
- Recorded: October 26, 27, 28 & 29, 1959; New York City
- Genre: Jazz
- Label: Roulette R 52043
- Producer: Teddy Reig

Phineas Newborn Jr. chronology
Piano Portraits by Phineas Newborn (1959)	I Love a Piano (1960)	A World of Piano! (1961)

I Love a Piano is an album by American jazz pianist Phineas Newborn Jr. recorded in 1959 and released on the Roulette label.

== Reception ==
The Allmusic site awarded the album 4½ stars.

Professional ratings
Review scores
Source	Rating
Allmusic	4.5/5 stars

== Track listing ==
1. "Take the "A" Train" (Billy Strayhorn) – 2:41
2. "Gee, Baby, Ain't I Good to You" (Andy Razaf, Don Redman) – 3:04
3. "Ain't Misbehavin'" (Fats Waller, Harry Brooks, Razaf) – 3:55
4. "I've Got the World on a String" (Harold Arlen, Ted Koehler) – 3:27
5. "The Midnight Sun Will Never Set" (Dorcas Cochran, Quincy Jones, Henri Salvador) – 4:03
6. "Real Gone Guy" (Nellie Lutcher) – 2:12
7. "Undecided" (Sid Robin, Charlie Shavers) – 3:40
8. "Ivy League Blues" (Phineas Newborn Jr.) – 3:46
9. "Love and Marriage" (Sammy Cahn, Jimmy Van Heusen) – 4:01
10. "Give Me the Simple Life" (Rube Bloom, Harry Ruby) – 4:12

== Personnel ==
- Phineas Newborn Jr. – piano
- John Simmons – bass
- Roy Haynes – drums
