= A World of Piano! =

Studio album by Phineas Newborn Jr.
- Released: June 1962
- Recorded: October 16, November 21, 1961
- Studio: Contemporary Records Studio, West Hollywood, California
- Genre: Jazz
- Length: 39:34
- Label: Contemporary C3600/S7600
- Producer: Lester Koenig

Phineas Newborn Jr. chronology
I Love a Piano (1959)	A World of Piano! (1962)	The Great Jazz Piano of Phineas Newborn Jr. (1962)

A World of Piano! is an album by American jazz pianist Phineas Newborn Jr. recorded in 1961 and released on the Contemporary label in June 1962.

== Background ==
This was Newborn's first recording for Contemporary and his first album as a leader in two years. He plays with different trios on the two sides of the original LP: Paul Chambers and Philly Joe Jones, both renowned for their work with Miles Davis, on side A and Sam Jones and Louis Hayes on side B.

Newborn is quoted in the original liner notes by Leonard Feather as saying, "You'll notice I used part of the Ravel Sonatine because of its harmonic structure, which is so similar to part of Lush Life, stretching out from the D flat to the F minor." Feather added, "I have heard very few instrumental versions of the Strayhorn theme, and none more moving than Newborn's."

The recording was remastered and issued on CD by Contemporary, in association with Original Jazz Classics, in 1991.

== Reception ==
An All About Jazz review by Richard J. Salvucci says, "A World of Piano! is just that, as advertised. There are several bop classics, such as 'Cheryl,' 'Manteca,' 'Oleo' and 'Dahoud,' [sic] all remarkable for their tempo and dazzling technique, perhaps best appreciated by non-pianists by watching Newborn in a sampling of videos preserved on You Tube. One can see why onlookers sometimes ... baptized him as a 'digital' demon or the man with a thousand fingers. ... Newborn's rhythm sections here are top flight. They had to be—especially the bassists—to execute at the tempos they did, sometimes doubling his lines, or sometimes seemingly functioning as a third hand while his other two dazzled in contrapuntal displays."

In an interview, pianist Geoffrey Keezer said that A World of Piano! "blew my mind ... changed my world forever. Phineas had chops comparable to Art Tatum or Oscar Peterson, but he also had a concept that was uniquely his. He could really orchestrate, for example he could play the whole Dizzy Gillespie big band arrangement of 'Manteca' on the piano. You could hear the trombones, the trumpets, the saxophones, every line was there. He had chops for days but didn't overuse them. He was soulful, he could play the blues, he used the Ravel Sonatine as an intro to 'Lush Life,' he was just such an incredible musical genius."

The 5-star AllMusic review by Scott Yanow states, "Newborn's Contemporary debut ... was made just before physical problems began to interrupt his career." Yanow calls the album a "superb recital" and singles out "Cheryl", "Manteca", "Daahoud", and "Oleo" as "highlights".

Professional ratings
Review scores
Source	Rating
AllMusic	5/5 stars
The Rolling Stone Jazz Record Guide	4/5 stars
The Penguin Guide to Jazz Recordings	3.5/4 stars

== Track listing ==
1. "Cheryl" (Charlie Parker) – 3:44
2. "Manteca" (Dizzy Gillespie, Gil Fuller, Chano Pozo) – 4:18
3. "Lush Life" (Billy Strayhorn) – 6:40
4. "Daahoud" (Clifford Brown) – 4:40
5. "Oleo" (Sonny Rollins) – 3:02
6. "Juicy Lucy" (Horace Silver) – 4:50
7. "For Carl" (Leroy Vinnegar) – 7:27
8. "Cabu" (Roland Alexander) – 4:53
- Recorded at Contemporary Records Studio in Hollywood, CA on October 16 (tracks 1–4) and November 21 (tracks 5–8), 1961

== Personnel ==
- Phineas Newborn Jr. – piano
- Paul Chambers (tracks 1–4), Sam Jones (tracks 5–8) – bass
- Philly Joe Jones (tracks 1–4), Louis Hayes (tracks 5–8) – drums
