= Jamil Nasser =

American jazz musician (1932–2010)

Jamil Nasser (born George Joyner, June 21, 1932 – February 13, 2010) and also credited on some of Ahmad Jamal's recordings as Jamil Sulieman, was an American jazz musician. He played double bass, electric bass, and tuba.

== Biography ==
Nasser, who was born in Memphis, Tennessee, learned piano from his mother as a child and started playing bass at age 16. As a student at Arkansas State University, he led the school band, and played bass and tuba in bands while stationed in Korea as a member of the U.S. Army. Following his discharge, he played with B.B. King in 1955 and 1956.

He moved to New York City in 1956, and played with Phineas Newborn and Sonny Rollins before the end of the decade. He began his recording career in 1956 with Newborn. He was originally credited on the recordings he made from 1956 - 1963 using his given name, George Joyner. (On some reissues of albums he recorded early in his career, his credit is revised to reflect his later name).

Nasser toured Europe and North Africa with Idrees Sulieman in 1959, then visited Paris and recorded with Lester Young. He briefly moved to Italy in 1961. After returning to New York in 1962, he formed his own trio, which lasted until 1964.

Following this, he joined Ahmad Jamal's trio, where he stayed through 1972. On the albums he recorded with Jamal, he was initially credited as Jamil Sulieman (as on 1964's Naked City Theme), and as Jamil Nasser (as on 1965's The Roar of the Greasepaint and later albums), the name he used professionally for the rest of his life. After leaving Jamal's trio, Nasser worked with Al Haig for the rest of the 1970s. In the 1980s and 1990s, he participated in many sessions with musicians such as George Coleman, Harold Mabern, Randy Weston, Gene Ammons and Hideaki Yoshioka but never recorded as a leader.

Nasser died of cardiac arrest at age 77 in Houston, Texas on February 13, 2010.

His son Zaid Nasser is an alto saxophonist based in New York City. Another son, Muneer Nasser, is a musician, historian, and author of Upright Bass, The Musical Life and Legacy of Jamil Nasser, published in 2018.

== Discography ==
With Gene Ammons

- The Big Sound (Prestige, 1958)
- Groove Blues (Prestige, 1958)

With Evans Bradshaw

- Look Out for Evans Bradshaw! (Riverside, 1958)

With George Coleman

- Manhattan Panorama (Theresa, 1985)
- I Could Write a Book: The Music of Richard Rodgers (Telarc, 1998)

With Eric Dolphy

- The Berlin Concerts (Enja, 1961)

With Lou Donaldson

- Lou Takes Off (Blue Note, 1958)

With Red Garland

- All Mornin' Long (1957)
- High Pressure (1957)
- Soul Junction (1957)
- Dig It! (Prestige, 1958)
- Rojo (Prestige, 1958)

With Al Haig

- Strings Attached (Choice, 1975)
- Chelsea Bridge (East Wind, 1975)
- Interplay (Sea Breeze, 1976)
- Serendipity (Interplay, 1977)
- Manhattan Memories (Sea Breeze, 1977 [1983])
- A Portrait of Bud Powell (Interplay, 1977)
- Reminiscence (Progressive, 1977)
- Ornithology (Progressive, 1977)
- Expressly Ellington (Spotlite, 1978)

With Ahmad Jamal

- Naked City Theme (Argo, 1964)
- The Roar of the Greasepaint (Argo, 1965)
- Extensions (Cadet, 1965)
- Rhapsody (Cadet, 1966)
- Heat Wave (Cadet, 1966)
- Cry Young (Cadet, 1967)
- The Bright, the Blue and the Beautiful (Cadet, 1968)
- Tranquility (ABC, 1968)
- Ahmad Jamal at the Top: Poinciana Revisited (Impulse!, 1968)
- The Awakening (Impulse!, 1970)
- Freeflight (Impulse!, 1971)
- Outertimeinnerspace (Impulse, 1971)
- Jamalca (20th Century, 1974)
- Jamal Plays Jamal (20th Century, 1974)
- Genetic Walk (20th Century, 1975)
- The Essence Part One (Birdology, 1995)
- Big Byrd: The Essence Part 2 (Birdology, 1995)

With Melba Liston

- Melba Liston and Her 'Bones (MetroJazz, 1958)

With Harold Mabern

- Pisces Calling (Trident, 1978)

With Herbie Mann, Charlie Rouse, Kenny Burrell and Mal Waldron

- Just Wailin' (New Jazz, 1958)

With Phineas Newborn, Jr.

- Phineas' Rainbow (RCA Victor, 1956)
- While My Lady Sleeps (RCA Victor, 1957)
- Fabulous Phineas (RCA Victor, 1958)

With Randy Weston

- New Faces at Newport (MetroJazz, 1958)
- Little Niles (United Artists, 1958)
- Portraits of Duke Ellington (1989)
- Portraits of Monk (1989)
- Self Portraits (1989)
- Spirits of Our Ancestors (1991)
- Volcano Blues (1993)

With Hideaki Yoshioka

- Moment to Moment (Venus, 2000)
