= The Great Jazz Piano of Phineas Newborn Jr. =

Studio album by Phineas Newborn Jr.
- Released: 1963
- Recorded: November 21, 1961 and September 12, 1962; Contemporary Records Studio, Hollywood, CA
- Genre: Jazz
- Length: 41:50
- Label: Contemporary M3611/S7611
- Producer: Lester Koenig

Phineas Newborn Jr. chronology
| A World of Piano! (1961) | The Great Jazz Piano of Phineas Newborn Jr. (1963) | The Newborn Touch (1964) |

The Great Jazz Piano of Phineas Newborn Jr. is an album by American jazz pianist Phineas Newborn Jr. recorded in 1961 and 1962 and released on the Contemporary label.

== Reception ==
The Allmusic review by Scott Yanow states "This recording lives up to its title. In his prime, Phineas Newborn had phenomenal technique (on the level of an Oscar Peterson), a creative imagination, and plenty of energy... This is piano jazz at its highest level".

Professional ratings
Review scores
| Source | Rating |
|---|---|
| Allmusic | 5/5 stars |
| The Rolling Stone Jazz Record Guide | 5/5 stars |
| The Penguin Guide to Jazz Recordings | 3/4 stars |

== Track listing ==
1. "Celia" (Bud Powell) – 4:42
2. "This Here" (Bobby Timmons) – 4:17
3. "Domingo" (Benny Golson) – 5:47
4. "Prelude to a Kiss" (Duke Ellington, Irving Gordon, Irving Mills) – 5:57
5. "Well, You Needn't" (Thelonious Monk) – 4:53
6. "Theme for Basie" (Phineas Newborn Jr.) – 3:36
7. "New Blues" (Newborn) – 4:29
8. "Way Out West" (Sonny Rollins) – 4:13
9. "Four" (Miles Davis) – 3:56
- Recorded at Contemporary Records Studio in Hollywood, CA on November 21, 1961 (tracks 1–4) and September 12, 1962 (tracks 5–8)

== Personnel ==
- Phineas Newborn Jr. – piano
- Sam Jones (tracks 6–9), Leroy Vinnegar (tracks 1–5) – bass
- Louis Hayes (tracks 6–9), Milt Turner (tracks 1–5) – drums
