= The Bright, the Blue and the Beautiful =

1968 studio album by Ahmad Jamal

Studio album by Ahmad Jamal
- Released: 1968
- Recorded: February 12 & 13, 1968
- Studio: Fine Recording Studios, New York
- Genre: Jazz
- Length: 28:05
- Label: Cadet; LPS-807
- Producer: Richard Evans

Ahmad Jamal chronology
Cry Young (1967)	The Bright, the Blue and the Beautiful (1968)	Tranquility (1968)

Professional ratings
Review scores
Source	Rating
AllMusic	2/5 stars

The Bright, the Blue and the Beautiful is an album by American jazz pianist Ahmad Jamal featuring performances recorded in 1968 and released on the Cadet label.

== Critical reception ==
Allmusic awarded the album 2 stars.

== Track listing ==
1. "Wild Is the Wind" (Dimitri Tiomkin, Ned Washington) – 2:38
2. "Ballad for Beverly" (Bob Williams) – 3:24
3. "Of Bass I Love" (Ahmad Jamal, Jamil Sulieman) – 2:40
4. "Yesterdays" (Otto Harbach, Jerome Kern) – 2:40
5. "I Wish I Knew (How It Would Feel to Be Free)" (Billy Taylor, Dick Dallas) – 2:47
6. "At Long Last Love" (Cole Porter) – 2:50
7. "Never Let Me Go" (Jay Livingston, Ray Evans) – 2:23
8. "Gypsies in the Wind" (Williams) – 2:55
9. "Lover Man" (Jimmy Davis, Ram Ramirez, James Sherman) – 2:48
10. "By Myself" (Howard Dietz, Arthur Schwartz) – 3:00

== Personnel ==
- Ahmad Jamal – piano
- Jamil Sulieman – bass
- Frank Gant – drums
- The Howard Roberts Choir – vocals
- Hale Smith – conductor
