= Live at the Montreal Jazz Festival 1985 =

Live album by Ahmad Jamal
- Released: 1986
- Recorded: July 1985
- Venue: Montreal International Jazz Festival, Montreal, Canada
- Genre: Jazz
- Length: 68:33
- Label: Atlantic 781 699-1
- Producer: Ahmad Jamal and Laura Hess-Hay

Ahmad Jamal chronology
Digital Works (1985)	Live at the Montreal Jazz Festival 1985 (1986)	Rossiter Road (1987)

Live at the Montreal Jazz Festival is a live album by American jazz pianist Ahmad Jamal featuring performances recorded at the Montreal International Jazz Festival in 1985 and released on the Atlantic label.

== Critical reception ==
Professional ratings
Review scores
Source	Rating
AllMusic	4.5/5 stars
The Penguin Guide to Jazz Recordings	3/4 stars

The double album was released in 1986. Billboard listed it as a "recommended" album in November of that year. Scott Yanow, in his review for AllMusic, stated, "This particular group is often reminiscent of Jamal's trios of the '50s, although with more modern bass playing and some denser piano than before".

== Track listing ==
All compositions by Ahmad Jamal except as indicated

1. "Yellow Fellow" (Christian Paulin) – 15:02
2. "Make Someone Happy" (Betty Comden, Adolph Green, Jule Styne) – 7:10
3. "Acorn" – 7:21
4. "Crossroads" – 8:52
5. "Rossiter Road" – 8:54
6. "'Round Midnight" (Thelonious Monk) – 6:52
7. "Footprints" (Wayne Shorter) – 8:09
8. "Ebony" (Jack DeJohnette) – 8:34

== Personnel ==
- Ahmad Jamal – piano
- James Cammack – bass
- Herlin Riley – drums
- Selden Newton – percussion
