= Rossiter Road =

Studio album by Ahmad Jamal
- Released: 1986
- Recorded: February 1, 1986
- Studio: Skyline Studios, New York City
- Genre: Jazz
- Length: 41:25
- Label: Atlantic 781 645-1
- Producer: Ahmad Jamal and Laura Hess-Hay

Ahmad Jamal chronology
Live at the Montreal Jazz Festival 1985 (1985)	Rossiter Road (1986)	Crystal (1987)

Professional ratings
Review scores
Source	Rating
Allmusic	3/5 stars

Rossiter Road is an album by American jazz pianist Ahmad Jamal featuring performances recorded in 1986 and released on the Atlantic label. The album debuted on the Billboard Top Jazz Album chart on June 7, 1986 and would spend 10 weeks on the chart, eventually peaking at #21.

== Critical reception ==
Scott Yanow of Allmusic said, "Few of pianist Ahmad Jamal's many recordings are not worth picking up, and this effort for Atlantic boasts some fresh material and fine playing".

== Track listing ==
All compositions by Ahmad Jamal except as indicated

1. "Milan" – 5:50
2. "If I Find the Way" – 4:12
3. "Without You" – 5:18
4. "Acorn" – 4:58
5. "Yellow Fellow" (Christian Paulin) – 6:20
6. "Autumn Rain" – 5:32
7. "Winter Snow" – 4:11
8. "Rossiter Road" – 6:09

== Personnel ==
- Ahmad Jamal – piano
- James Cammack – bass
- Herlin Riley – drums
- Manolo Badrena – percussion
