= Tranquility (Ahmad Jamal album) =

1968 studio album by Ahmad Jamal

Studio album by Ahmad Jamal
- Released: 1968
- Recorded: 1968
- Genre: Jazz
- Length: 38:22
- Label: ABC; ABCS 660
- Producer: Bob Thiele

Ahmad Jamal chronology
The Bright, the Blue and the Beautiful (1968)	Tranquility (1968)	Ahmad Jamal at the Top: Poinciana Revisited (1968)

Professional ratings
Review scores
Source	Rating
AllMusic	3/5 stars

Tranquility is an album by American jazz pianist Ahmad Jamal featuring performances recorded in 1968 and originally released on ABC-Paramount and rereleased on the Impulse! label in 1973.

== Critical reception ==
AllMusic awarded the album 3 stars, stating: "While not to be ranked amongst his greatest works, Tranquility is a very fine recording and any opportunity to hear this master should not be missed."

== Track listing ==
All compositions by Ahmad Jamal except where noted.

1. "I Say a Little Prayer" (Burt Bacharach, Hal David) – 2:25
2. "The Look of Love" (Bacharach, David) – 2:48
3. "When I Look in Your Eyes" (Leslie Bricusse) – 4:18
4. "Illusions Opticas" (Joe Kennedy) – 2:25
5. "Nothing Ever Changes My Love for You" (Jack Segal, Marvin Fisher) – 2:42
6. "Emily" (Johnny Mandel, Johnny Mercer) – 3:41
7. "Tranquility" – 8:53
8. "Free Again" (Armand Canfora, Joss Baselli, Robert Colby) – 4:45
9. "Manhattan Reflections" – 6:25

== Personnel ==
- Ahmad Jamal – piano
- Jamil Sulieman – bass
- Frank Gant – drums
