= Solo Piano (Phineas Newborn Jr. album) =

Studio album by Phineas Newborn Jr.
- Released: 1975
- Recorded: January 1974
- Studio: Ardent Studios (Memphis, TN)
- Genre: Jazz
- Length: 35:45
- Label: Atlantic SD 1672
- Producer: Fred Ford

Phineas Newborn Jr. chronology
Harlem Blues (1969)	Solo Piano (1975)	Solo (1975)

Solo Piano is an album by American jazz pianist Phineas Newborn Jr. recorded in 1974 and released on the Atlantic label.

== Reception ==
Professional ratings
Review scores
Source	Rating
AllMusic	2.5/5 stars
The Penguin Guide to Jazz	2.5/4 stars

The AllMusic review by Scott Yanow states "The set of solo performances faithfully documents the prodigious technique that first gained the pianist recognition in the 1950s. Newborn's technical skills were an inextricable part of a musical character anchored in high drama and passages overflowing with a frothing torrent of notes".

== Track listing ==
1. "Together Again" (Teddy Edwards) – 1:39
2. "Serenade in Blue/Where Is the Love" (Harry Warren, Mack Gordon/Ralph MacDonald, William Salter) – 3:45
3. "Lorraine's Walk/Willow Weep for Me" (Oscar Pettiford/Ann Ronell) – 5:08
4. "Nica's Dream" (Horace Silver) – 2:20
5. "Goodbye/Flamingo" (Gordon Jenkins/Ted Grouya, Edmund Anderson) – 5:42
6. "Live and Love/One for Horace" (Phineas Newborn Jr.) – 3:19
7. "Bouncing with Bud" (Gil Fuller, Bud Powell) – 2:19
8. "The Memphis Blues" (W. C. Handy) – 2:13
9. "The Midnight Sun Will Never Set" (Dorcas Cochran, Quincy Jones, Henri Salvador) – 6:56
10. "Out of This World" (Harold Arlen, Johnny Mercer) – 2:33
11. "Giant Steps/Everything I Have Is Yours/Where Is the Love (Reprise)" (John Coltrane/Burton Lane, Harold Adamson/MacDonald, Salter) – 8:38

== Personnel ==
- Phineas Newborn Jr. – piano
