= Please Send Me Someone to Love (album) =

Studio album by Phineas Newborn Jr.
- Released: 1969
- Recorded: February 12–13, 1969
- Studio: Contemporary Records Studio, Hollywood, CA
- Genre: Jazz
- Length: 41:50
- Label: Contemporary S7622
- Producer: Lester Koenig

Phineas Newborn Jr. chronology
The Newborn Touch (1964)	Please Send Me Someone to Love (1969)	Harlem Blues (1969)

Please Send Me Someone to Love is an album by American jazz pianist Phineas Newborn Jr. recorded in 1969 and released on the Contemporary label. The album was recorded at the same sessions that produced Harlem Blues.

== Reception ==
The Allmusic review by Scott Yanow states "The emphasis generally is on vintage tunes, and Newborn shows throughout that he was still very much in his musical prime".

Professional ratings
Review scores
Source	Rating
Allmusic	4/5 stars
The Rolling Stone Jazz Record Guide	4/5 stars
The Penguin Guide to Jazz Recordings	3/4 stars

== Track listing ==
1. "Please Send Me Someone to Love" (Percy Mayfield) – 5:05
2. "Rough Ridin'" (Ella Fitzgerald, Hank Jones, Bill Tennyson) – 4:09
3. "Come Sunday" (Duke Ellington) – 4:52
4. "Brentwood Blues" (Phineas Newborn Jr.) – 8:01
5. "He's a Real Gone Guy" (Nellie Lutcher) – 4:39
6. "Black Coffee" (Sonny Burke, Paul Francis Webster) – 7:03
7. "Little Niles" (Randy Weston) – 4:20
8. "Stay on It" (Count Basie, Tadd Dameron) – 5:05

== Personnel ==
- Phineas Newborn Jr. – piano
- Ray Brown – bass
- Elvin Jones – drums
