= The Essence Part One =

Studio album by Ahmad Jamal
- Released: 1995
- Recorded: October 30–31, 1994 and February 6–7, 1995
- Studio: Studio Marcadet, La Plaine Saint Denis, France and Clinton Recording Studios, New York City
- Genre: Jazz
- Length: 55:02
- Label: Birdology 529327-2

Ahmad Jamal chronology
| I Remember Duke, Hoagy & Strayhorn (1995) | The Essence Part One (1995) | Big Byrd: The Essence Part 2 (1995) |

Professional ratings
Review scores
| Source | Rating |
|---|---|
| AllMusic | 4.5/5 stars |
| The Penguin Guide to Jazz Recordings | 3/4 stars |

The Essence Part One is an album by the American jazz pianist Ahmad Jamal, containing performances recorded in Paris in 1994 and New York City in 1995. It was released on the Birdology label in 1995.

== Critical reception ==
Richard S. Ginell, in his review for AllMusic, states: "This absorbing collection is a testament to the continuing ability of Ahmad Jamal to startle and engage jazz listeners."

== Track listing ==
All compositions by Ahmad Jamal unless noted.

1. "Flight" – 6:29
2. "Toulouse" – 6:55
3. "The Essence" – 10:10
4. "Lover Man" (Jimmy Davis, Ram Ramirez, James Sherman) – 5:45
5. "Catalina" – 6:40
6. "Autumn Leaves" (Joseph Kosma, Johnny Mercer, Jacques Prévert) – 6:56
7. "Street of Dreams" (Sam M. Lewis, Victor Young) – 5:33
8. "Bahia" (Ary Barroso) – 6:34

== Personnel ==
- Ahmad Jamal – piano
- James Cammack – bass (tracks 1, 2, 4, 5, 7 & 8)
- Jamil Nasser – bass (tracks 3 & 6)
- Idris Muhammad – drums
- Manolo Badrena – percussion
- George Coleman – tenor saxophone (tracks 3 & 6)
