= Ahmad Jamal at the Top: Poinciana Revisited =

Live album by Ahmad Jamal
- Released: 1969
- Recorded: 1968
- Genre: Jazz
- Length: 42:04
- Label: Impulse! AS 9176
- Producer: Ahmad Jamal, Johnny Pate

Ahmad Jamal chronology
Tranquility (1968)	Ahmad Jamal at the Top: Poinciana Revisited (1969)	The Awakening (1970)

Ahmad Jamal at the Top: Poinciana Revisited is a live album by American jazz pianist Ahmad Jamal featuring performances recorded at The Village Gate in 1968 and released on the Impulse! label.

== Critical reception ==
Professional ratings
Review scores
Source	Rating
AllMusic	4/5 stars
The Rolling Stone Jazz Record Guide	3/5 stars

Thom Jurek of AllMusic states that the album "reveals Jamal playing in a more driving, percussive style, though he keeps his utterly elegant chord voicings intact".

== Track listing ==
All compositions by Ahmad Jamal except where noted.

1. "Have You Met Miss Jones" (Lorenz Hart, Richard Rodgers) – 3:47
2. "Poinciana" (Buddy Bernier, Nat Simon) – 9:19
3. "Lament" – 8:05
4. "Call Me" (Tony Hatch) – 4:51
5. "(Theme from) Valley of the Dolls" (André Previn, Dory Previn) – 4:23
6. "Frank's Tune" (Frank Strozier) – 5:50
7. "How Insensitive" (Antônio Carlos Jobim, Vinícius de Moraes) – 5:52

== Personnel ==
- Ahmad Jamal – piano
- Jamil Sulieman – bass
- Frank Gant – drums
