= Look Out – Phineas Is Back! =

Studio album by Phineas Newborn Jr.
- Released: 1978
- Recorded: December 7 & 8, 1976; RCA Studios, Los Angeles, CA
- Genre: Jazz
- Length: 45:25
- Label: Pablo 2310-801
- Producer: Ray Brown

Phineas Newborn Jr. chronology
Back Home (1976)	Look Out – Phineas Is Back! (1978)	Phineas Is Genius (1977)

Look Out – Phineas Is Back! is an album by American jazz pianist Phineas Newborn Jr., recorded in 1976 but not released on the Pablo label until 1978.

== Reception ==
The AllMusic review by Scott Yanow stated: "On what would be one of his final sessions, Newborn is in surprisingly strong form playing in a trio".

Professional ratings
Review scores
Source	Rating
AllMusic	4.5/5 stars
The Penguin Guide to Jazz Recordings	3/4 stars
The Rolling Stone Jazz Record Guide	4/5 stars

== Track listing ==
All compositions by Phineas Newborn Jr. except as indicated

1. "Salt Peanuts" (Kenny Clarke, Dizzy Gillespie) – 5:40
2. "The Man I Love" (George Gershwin, Ira Gershwin) – 5:14
3. "You Are the Sunshine of My Life" (Stevie Wonder) – 6:19
4. "Abbers Song" (Ray Brown) – 4:19
5. "Tamarind Blues" – 5:26
6. "A Night in Tunisia" (Gillespie, Frank Paparelli) – 4:49
7. "Sometimes I'm Happy" (Irving Caesar, Vincent Youmans) – 5:42
8. "Donald's Dream" – 4:59
9. "Just in Time" (Betty Comden, Adolph Green, Jule Styne) – 2:57 Bonus track on CD reissue

== Personnel ==
- Phineas Newborn Jr. – piano
- Ray Brown – bass
- Jimmy Smith – drums
