= Chicago Revisited: Live at Joe Segal's Jazz Showcase =

Live album by Ahmad Jamal
- Released: 1993
- Recorded: November 13–14, 1992
- Venue: The Blackstone Hotel, Chicago
- Genre: Jazz
- Length: 59:41
- Label: Telarc

Ahmad Jamal chronology
Live in Paris 1992 (1992)	Chicago Revisited: Live at Joe Segal's Jazz Showcase (1993)	I Remember Duke, Hoagy & Strayhorn (1994)

Professional ratings
Review scores
Source	Rating
AllMusic	4.5/5 stars
The Penguin Guide to Jazz Recordings	4/4 stars

Chicago Revisited: Live at Joe Segal's Jazz Showcase is a live album by American jazz pianist Ahmad Jamal featuring performances recorded in Chicago in 1992 and released on the Telarc label.

== Critical reception ==
In his review for AllMusic, Scott Yanow states: "Although it had been more than 40 years since his debut recording, pianist Ahmad Jamal's playing was as viable as ever in the 1990s. Teamed up with bassist John Heard and drummer Yoron Israel for this live Telarc CD, Jamal plays a particularly inspired repertoire that includes "All the Things You Are," Clifford Brown's "Daahoud," John Handy's "Dance to the Lady" and "Be My Love" among its nine selections. Jamal's style had developed since his early days, but his basic approach was unchanged while still sounding quite fresh. This date is an excellent example of Ahmad Jamal's unique sound and highly appealing music in the '90s.".

== Track listing ==
1. "All the Things You Are" (Oscar Hammerstein II, Jerome Kern) – 7:37
2. "Daahoud" (Clifford Brown) – 3:57
3. "Tater Pie" (Irving Ashby, Sonny Terry) – 6:56
4. "Bellows" (Ahmad Jamal) – 12:35
5. "Blue Gardenia" (Lester Lee, Bob Russell) – 7:57
6. "Dance to the Lady" (John Handy) – 6:15
7. "Be My Love" (Nicholas Brodszky, Sammy Cahn) – 5:20
8. "Where Are You?" (Harold Adamson, Jimmy McHugh) – 4:11
9. "Lullaby of Birdland" (George Shearing, George David Weiss) – 4:52

== Personnel ==
- Ahmad Jamal – piano
- John Heard – double bass
- Yoron Israel – drums
