= Live in Paris 1992 =

Live album by Ahmad Jamal
- Released: 1992
- Recorded: April 3–4, 1992
- Venue: Salle de Spectacles, Colombes, France
- Genre: Jazz
- Length: 56:11
- Label: Birdology 849408-2

Ahmad Jamal chronology
Live! At Blues Alley (1992)	Live in Paris 1992 (1992)	Chicago Revisited: Live at Joe Segal's Jazz Showcase (1993)

Live in Paris 1992 is a live album by American jazz pianist Ahmad Jamal recorded at la Salle de Spectacles (now L'Avant Seine/Théâtre de Colombes) in Colombes, France. It was recorded on April 3 and 4, 1992, and released on the Verve Records Birdology label the following September.

== Critical reception ==
Professional ratings
Review scores
Source	Rating
AllMusic	4/5 stars
The Penguin Guide to Jazz Recordings	3/4 stars

In his review for AllMusic, Scott Yanow states: "Ahmad Jamal's style has become more extroverted and virtuosic since his early days in the 1950s, and his performances with his trio are often more dramatic. However the pianist is still a master at using space and dynamics, interacting closely with his sidemen, and creating music that builds slowly in intensity. His Paris concert from 1992 is an excellent example of his more recent work".

== Track listing ==
1. "The Tube" (Ahmad Jamal) – 7:53
2. "Alone Together/Laura/Wild Is the Wind" (Arthur Schwartz, Howard Dietz/David Raksin, Johnny Mercer/Dimitri Tiomkin, Ned Washington) – 7:09
3. "Caravan" (Duke Ellington, Irving Mills, Juan Tizol) – 5:19
4. "Easy Living" (Ralph Rainger, Leo Robin) – 6:27
5. "Acorn" (Jamal) – 8:41
6. "Dreamy" (Erroll Garner) – 7:13
7. "Appreciation" (Johnny Pate) – 5:16
8. "Look for the Silver Lining" (Buddy DeSylva, Jerome Kern) – 3:08
9. "The Aftermath" (Jamal) – 5:08

== Personnel ==
- Ahmad Jamal – piano
- James Cammack – bass (tracks 1–5,7 & 9)
- Todd Coolman – bass (track 6)
- David Bowler – drums (tracks 1–5, 7, & 9)
- Gordon Lane – drums (track 6)
