= Extensions (Ahmad Jamal album) =

Studio album by Ahmad Jamal
- Released: 1965
- Recorded: May 18–20, 1965
- Studio: Nola Penthouse Studio, New York
- Genre: Jazz
- Length: 34:06
- Label: Argo; LPS-758
- Producer: Ahmad Jamal and Dave Usher

Ahmad Jamal chronology
The Roar of the Greasepaint (1965)	Extensions (1965)	Rhapsody (1965)

Professional ratings
Review scores
Source	Rating
Allmusic	3/5 stars

Extensions is an album by American jazz pianist Ahmad Jamal featuring performances recorded in 1965 and released on the Argo label.

== Critical reception ==
AllMusic awarded the album 3 stars.

== Track listing ==
1. "Extensions" (Ahmad Jamal) – 13:10
2. "Dance to the Lady" (John Handy) – 5:50
3. "This Terrible Planet" (Bob Williams) – 7:56
4. "Whisper Not" (Benny Golson) – 7:10

== Personnel ==
- Ahmad Jamal – piano
- Jamil Nasser – bass
- Vernel Fournier – drums
