= James Cammack =

American jazz bassist

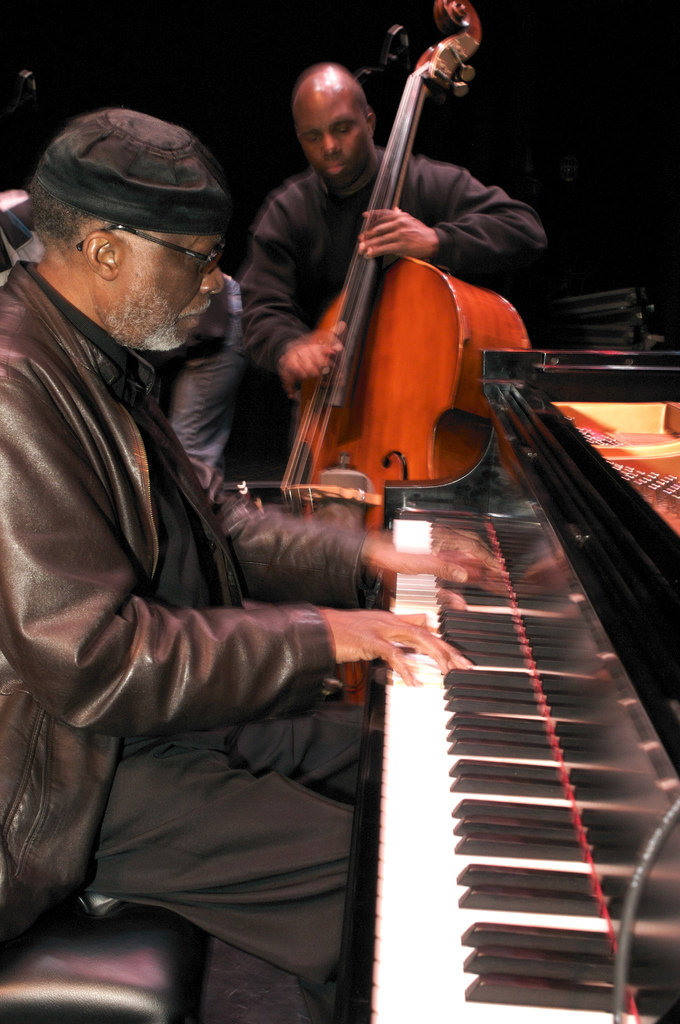
- James Cammack plays double bass with pianist Ahmad Jamal in the foreground.

Background information
- Born: April 15, 1956 (age 70)
- Origin: Cornwall, New York, U.S.
- Genre: Jazz
- Occupation: Musician
- Instruments: Double bass, bass guitar
- Labels: Verve, Dreyfus
- Military service
- Allegiance: United States
- Branch: United States Army
- Service years: 1974–1982
- Unit: USMA Band

James Alfred Conrad Cammack Jr. (born April 15, 1956) is an American jazz bassist from Cornwall, New York.

== Career ==
For nearly thirty years, he played bass for Ahmad Jamal. His debut solo album, Both Sides of the Coin, was released in 2012. Before joining Jamal in 1983, he played in U.S. Army bands. At the age of eighteen in 1974, he became a member of the West Point Army Band as a trumpeter, though he was learning bass. He played for the Jazz Knights and on weekends performed at resorts in the Catskill mountains of New York. For biggest influences on bass, he lists Israel Crosby, George Duvivier, and Milt Hinton.

== Discography ==
With Ahmad Jamal

- Rossiter Road (Atlantic, 1986)
- Live at the Montreal Jazz Festival 1985 (Atlantic, 1986)
- Crystal (Atlantic, 1987)
- Pittsburgh (Atlantic, 1989)
- Live in Paris 1992 (Birdology, 1993)
- The Essence Part One (Verve, 1995)
- Big Byrd: The Essence Part 2 (Verve, 1997)
- Nature: The Essence Part Three (Atlantic, 1998)
- Picture Perfect (Birdology, 2000)
- A L'Olympia (Dreyfus, 2001)
- In Search of Momentum (Dreyfus, 2003)
- After Fajr (Dreyfus, 2005)
- It's Magic (Dreyfus, 2008)
- A Quiet Time (Dreyfus, 2009)
- Marseille (Jazz Village, 2017)
- Ballades (Jazz Village, 2019)

With Malachi Thompson

- Freebop Now! (Delmark, 1998)
- Rising Daystar (Delmark, 1999)

With others

- Alexis Cole, Close Your Eyes (Venus, 2014)
- Larry Coryell, Montgomery (Patuxent, 2011)
- Mac Chrupcala, Bernard Purdie, One More for the Road (2013)
- Howard Johnson, Right Now! (Verve, 1997)
- Shahin Novrasli, Emanation (Jazz Village, 2017)
- Roberto Tarenzi, Jorge Rossy, Love and Other Simple Matters (Via Veneto, 2018)
