= Sweet and Lovely =

1931 American popular song

Song
- Published: 1931
- Songwriters: Gus Arnheim, Charles N. Daniels, and Harry Tobias

"Sweet and Lovely"
Donald Novis with Gus Arnheim & His Cocoanut Grove Orchestra

"Sweet and Lovely" is an American popular song of 1931, composed by Gus Arnheim, Charles N. Daniels, and Harry Tobias.

Recordings of the song which charted in 1931 are:

- Gus Arnheim & His Cocoanut Grove Orchestra with a vocal refrain by Donald Novis – No. 1 on the charts for 14 weeks
- Guy Lombardo & His Royal Canadians – No. 2
- Bing Crosby – No. 9 – recorded September 14, 1931 with Victor Young and His Orchestra. (this was reissued in 1944 and briefly charted at No. 27)
- Ben Bernie & His Orchestra – No. 12
- Russ Columbo – No. 19

== Other recordings ==
- Denny Dennis – with Jay Wilbur and his Orchestra (1940)
- Thelonious Monk – for his 1952 album Thelonious Monk Trio
- Bing Crosby – for his 1954 album Bing: A Musical Autobiography
- Gerry Mulligan – for his 1955 album Presenting the Gerry Mulligan Sextet
- Gerry Mulligan – for his 1957 album Mulligan Meets Monk
- Ella Fitzgerald – for her 1959 album Ella Fitzgerald Sings Sweet Songs for Swingers
- Bill Evans Trio - for their 1961 album Explorations
- April Stevens & Nino Tempo - charted July 1962, peaking at No. 77 on the US Hot 100.
- Thelonious Monk – for his 1962 quartet album Monk's Dream
- Lou Donaldson – for his 1967 album Lush Life (orchestrated)
- Phineas Newborn Jr. recorded in 1969 and released on his 1975 album Harlem Blues
- Bryan Ferry – for his 1999 album As Time Goes By
