= While My Lady Sleeps =

Studio album by Phineas Newborn Jr.
- Released: 1957
- Recorded: April 23 & 24, 1957; New York City
- Genre: Jazz
- Label: RCA Victor LPM 1474

Phineas Newborn Jr. chronology
Phineas' Rainbow (1957)	While My Lady Sleeps (1957)	Phineas Newborn Jr. Plays Harold Arlen's Music from Jamaica (1957)

While My Lady Sleeps is an album by the American jazz pianist Phineas Newborn Jr. with Dennis Farnon and His Orchestra recorded in 1957 and released on the RCA Victor label.

== Reception ==
The Allmusic review by Scott Yanow states "Although not as vital as his usual trio dates and Farnon's string arrangements are not too inspiring, the music is pleasing and finds Newborn in his early prime".

Professional ratings
Review scores
Source	Rating
Allmusic	4/5 stars

== Track listing ==
1. "Moonlight in Vermont" (John Blackburn, Karl Suessdorf) – 5:06
2. "Don't You Know I Care (Or Don't You Care to Know)" (Mack David, Duke Ellington) – 5:05
3. "Lazy Mood" (Eddie Miller, Johnny Mercer) – 5:22
4. "I'm Old Fashioned" (Jerome Kern, Mercer) – 3:57
5. "Black Is the Color of My True Love's Hair" (Traditional) – 4:05
6. "While My Lady Sleeps" (Bronisław Kaper, Gus Kahn) – 6:12
7. "It's Easy to Remember" (Lorenz Hart, Richard Rodgers) – 5:02
8. "Bali Ha'i" (Oscar Hammerstein II, Richard Rodgers) – 4:21
9. "If I Should Lose You" (Ralph Rainger, Leo Robin) – 5:48

== Personnel ==
- Phineas Newborn Jr. – piano
- George Joyner – bass
- Alvin Stoller – drums
- Victor Arno, Len Atkins, Israel Baker, Jack Gasselin, Benny Gill, Henry Hill, Carl LaMagna, Marvin Limonick, Dan Lube, Alfred Lustgarten, Ralph Shaeffer, Jerry Vinci, Eunice Wennermark – violin
- Cecil Figelski, Al Harshman, Abraham Hochstein, Harry Hymans, Lou Kievman, Joe Reilich, George Neikrug – viola
- Ray Kramer, Ed Lustgarten, George Neikrug – cello
- Dennis Farnon – arranger, conductor
