= Ballades (Ahmad Jamal album) =

Studio album by Ahmad Jamal
- Released: September 13, 2019
- Genre: Jazz
- Length: 50:44
- Label: Jazz Village JV3357015758

Ahmad Jamal chronology
Marseille (2017)	Ballades (2019)

Professional ratings
Review scores
Source	Rating
AllAboutJazz	4/5 stars

Ballades is the final album by American jazz pianist Ahmad Jamal. Consisting mostly of solo piano recordings, the album was recorded at the same time as the 2016 album Marseille. Jamal wrote of the album, "It includes my solo version of “Poinciana”, recorded between takes during our session for “Marseille”. My original version remains one of the most successful recordings in the history of instrumental music; and one of the most plagiarized."

== Critical reception ==
In a review for KCRW, Tom Schnabel writes, "Ballades was released only at the insistence of Jamal’s executive producer, Seydou Barry, and we are fortunate to have it. Solo piano distills Jamal’s genius to its essence—a distillation involving a lifetime of creative imagination and superb musicianship. It amounts to the full evolution of a life in music from one of our greatest musical artists."

Dan Bilawsky writes for All About Jazz, "His calling cards—vamping moorings, dancing lines, intelligent restraint, mastery over time, orchestral visions, a Midas touch—all play a part in the production. Originals like "Because I Love You," with the in-and-out left hand ostinatos lighting the way, and "Whisperings," with both seductive and scampering charms, mark Jamal as a man wholly comfortable in his skin. ... he remains a treasure capable of stirring passions without force or forced ambitions."

== Track listing ==
All compositions by Ahmad Jamal unless noted.

1. "Marseille" – 4:56
2. "Because I Love You" – 6:00
3. "I Should Care" (Paul Weston, Axel Stordahl, Sammy Cahn) – 3:25
4. "Poinciana" (Nat Simon, Buddy Bernier) – 4:28
5. "Land of Dreams" (Eddie Heywood, Jr., Norman Gimbel) – 2:16
6. "What's New?" (Bob Haggart, Johnny Burke) – 4:52
7. "So Rare" (Jerry Herst, Jack Sharpe) – 3:05
8. "Whisperings" – 3:30
9. "Spring Is Here" (Richard Rodgers, Lorenz Hart)/"Your Story" (Bill Evans) – 5:50
10. "Emily" (Johnny Mandel, Johnny Mercer) – 4:21

== Personnel ==
- Ahmad Jamal – piano
- James Cammack – bass (tracks 1, 7, 9)
