= Ahmad Jamal '73 =

Studio album by Ahmad Jamal
- Released: 1973
- Recorded: 1973
- Genre: Jazz
- Length: 40:46
- Label: 20th Century T-417
- Producer: Ahmad Jamal and Richard Evans

Ahmad Jamal chronology
Outertimeinnerspace (1972)	Ahmad Jamal '73 (1973)	Jamalca (1974)

Professional ratings
Review scores
Source	Rating
Allmusic	2/5 stars

Ahmad Jamal '73 is an album by American jazz pianist Ahmad Jamal featuring performances recorded in 1973 and released on the 20th Century label.

== Critical reception ==
The Allmusic review awarded the album 2 stars, stating: "Ahmad Jamal '73 is an early instance of him playing an instrument besides acoustic piano, but it is a few tracks away from being a necessity."

== Track listing ==
No.	Title	Writer(s)	Original artist	Length
1.	"The World Is a Ghetto"	War	War	9:48
2.	"Children of the Night"		Thom Bell, Linda Creed	5:08
3.	"Superstition"	Stevie Wonder	Stevie Wonder	4:08
4.	"Trilby"		Orlando Murden	4:59
5.	"Sustah, Sustah"		Ra Twani Za Yemeni	6:47
6.	"Soul Girl"		Joel Beal	3:31
7.	"Peace at Last"		Charles Colbert	6:21
Total length:				40:46

== Personnel ==
- Ahmad Jamal – electric piano
- Orchestra arranged and conducted by Richard Evans
