= Live in Paris 1996 =

Live album by Ahmad Jamal
- Released: 2003
- Recorded: October 26, 1996
- Venue: Salle Pleyel, Paris
- Genre: Jazz
- Length: 59:26
- Label: Dreyfus Jazz
- Producer: Jean-François Deiber, J.F.D. Productions

Ahmad Jamal chronology
Big Byrd: The Essence Part 2 (1996)	Live in Paris 1996 (2003)	Nature: The Essence Part Three (1998)

Live in Paris 1996 is a live album by the American jazz pianist Ahmad Jamal. It is the recording of a concert which took place at the concert venue Salle Pleyel in Paris on October 26, 1996.

It was produced by the French company J.F.D. Productions and was recorded by the Radio France Mobile Studio. But it was not mastered until 1999 and was not issued until 2003, when it was released by Dreyfus Jazz.

Jamal regarded this album as one of his best recordings.

== Track listing ==
1. "Bellows" (Ahmad Jamal) 14:09
2. "Patches" (Carlos Watt) 11:04
3. "Autumn Leaves" (Jacques Prévert, Johnny Mercer) 12:02
4. "Devil's In My Den" (Jamal) 12:23
5. "There's a Lull in My Life" (Harry Revel, Mack Gordon) 9:48

== Personnel ==
- Ahmad Jamal – piano
- Jeff Chambers – bass
- Calvin Keys – guitar
- Yoron Israel – drums
- Manolo Badrena – percussion
- Joe Kennedy – violin
- George Coleman – saxophone
