= Phineas Newborn Jr. =

American jazz pianist (1931–1989)

Background information
- Born: December 14, 1931; Whiteville, Tennessee, U.S.
- Died: May 26, 1989 (aged 57) Memphis, Tennessee, U.S.
- Genre: Jazz
- Occupation: Musician
- Instrument: Piano
- Label
- Relatives: Calvin Newborn (brother)

Phineas Newborn Jr. (December 14, 1931 – May 26, 1989) was an American jazz pianist, whose principal influences were Art Tatum, Oscar Peterson, and Bud Powell.

== Biography ==
Newborn was born in Whiteville, Tennessee, and came from a musical family: his father, Phineas Newborn Sr., was a drummer in blues bands, and his younger brother, Calvin, was a jazz guitarist. He studied piano as well as trumpet, and tenor and baritone saxophone.

Before moving on to work with Lionel Hampton, Charles Mingus, and others, Newborn first played in an R&B band led by his father on drums, with his brother Calvin on guitar, Tuff Green on bass, Ben Branch and future Hi Records star Willie Mitchell. The group was the house band at the now famous Plantation Inn Club in West Memphis, Arkansas, from 1947 to 1951, and recorded as B. B. King's band on his first recordings in 1949, as well as the Sun Records sessions in 1950. They left West Memphis in 1951 to tour with Jackie Brenston as the "Delta Cats" in support of the record "Rocket 88", recorded by Sam Phillips and considered by many to be the first ever rock & roll record (it was the first Billboard No. 1 record for Chess Records).

Among his earliest recordings, from the early 1950s, are those for Sun Records with blues harmonica player Big Walter Horton.

In 1956, Newborn began to perform in New York City, recording his first album as a leader in that year, Here Is Phineas for Atlantic Records. His trios and quartets at that time included his brother Calvin on guitar, bassists Oscar Pettiford, George Joyner and drummers Kenny Clarke and Philly Joe Jones. Newborn created enough interest internationally to work as a solo pianist in Stockholm, Sweden, in 1958 and in Rome, Italy, the following year. He drew much critical acclaim, for both his leonine technique and meticulously artful playing at any tempo. The most often-noted feature of Newborn's playing is fast-tempo parallel improvisation, two octaves apart in the manner of Oscar Peterson, which requires great ambidexterity.

On March 16, 1960, 29-year-old Newborn replaced Thelonious Monk and performed "It's All Right with Me" on the ABC-TV series Music for a Spring Night. Newborn moved to Los Angeles that year, and recorded a sequence of piano trio albums for the Contemporary label. Critics often noted his playing style as being too technical, and Newborn developed emotional problems as a result. He was admitted to the Camarillo State Mental Hospital for some periods, and suffered a nervous breakdown related to conflicts with a record label during his career. Newborn later sustained a hand injury that hindered his playing.

Newborn's later work was intermittent due to ongoing health problems. This is most true of the period from the mid-1960s to mid-1970s when he faded from view, underappreciated and underrecorded. He made a partial comeback in the late 1970s and early 1980s, although this return ultimately failed to benefit his financial situation. He died in 1989 after the discovery of a growth on his lungs and was buried in Memphis National Cemetery.

== Legacy ==
According to jazz historian Nat Hentoff, Newborn's plight spurred the 1989 founding of the Jazz Foundation of America, a group dedicated to helping with the medical bills and other financial needs of retired jazz greats. In the early 1990s the four-player Contemporary Piano Ensemble was formed by pianists Harold Mabern, James Williams, Mulgrew Miller, and Geoff Keezer to pay tribute to Newborn; it recorded two albums and toured internationally.

== Reputation ==
Despite his setbacks, many of Newborn's records, such as Phineas' Rainbow, The Great Jazz Piano of Phineas Newborn Jr., and Harlem Blues, remain highly regarded. Jazz commentator Scott Yanow referred to Newborn as "one of the most technically skilled and brilliant pianists in jazz." Evidence of his technical prowess can be heard on tracks such as "Sometimes I'm Happy", from the album Look Out – Phineas Is Back!, on which Newborn performs extended, complex, and brisk solos with both hands in unison. Leonard Feather said of him, "In his prime, he was one of the three greatest jazz pianists of all time." Oscar Peterson said, "If I had to choose the best all-around pianist of anyone who's followed me chronologically, unequivocally ... I would say Phineas Newborn, Jr."

== Discography ==
=== As leader/co-leader ===
Year recorded	Title	Label	Notes
1956	Here Is Phineas	Atlantic	Quartet, with Calvin Newborn (g), Oscar Pettiford (b), Kenny Clarke (d). LP 1235
1956	Phineas' Rainbow	RCA Victor	Quartet, with Calvin Newborn (g), George Joyner (b), Philly Joe Jones (d). LPM 1421
1957	While My Lady Sleeps	RCA Victor	Trio and String Section, with George Joyner (b), Alvin Stoller (d) and strings arranged and conducted by Dennis Farnon. LPM 1474
1957	Phineas Newborn Jr. Plays Harold Arlen's Music from Jamaica	RCA Victor	With orchestra: Ernie Royal (tp), Nick Ferrante (tp), Jimmy Cleveland (tb), Sahib Shihab (as, bars, cl, bcl), Jerome Richardson (ts, fl), Les Spann (g), George Duvivier (b), Osie Johnson (d), Francisco Pozo and Willie Rodriguez (per). LPM 1589
1958	Fabulous Phineas	RCA Victor	Quartet, with Calvin Newborn (g), George Joyner (b), Denzil Best (d). LPM 1873
1958	Phineas Newborn Plays Again!	Edizioni Dell'Isola (Italy)	Trio, with Carlo Loffredo (b), Sergio Pisi (d). EIJ 2024 - released 1978
1958	Stockholm Jam Session Volume 1	SteepleChase	Sextet, with Benny Bailey (t), Oscar Pettiford (b) Rune Carlsson (d). SCCD-36025 - released 1992
1958	Stockholm Jam Session Volume 2	SteepleChase	Sextet, with Benny Bailey (t), Oscar Pettiford (b) Rune Carlsson (d). SCCD-36026 - released 1993
1959	Piano Portraits by Phineas Newborn	Roulette	Trio, with John Simmons (b) and Roy Haynes (d). R 52031
1959	I Love a Piano	Roulette	Trio, with John Simmons (b) and Roy Haynes (d). R 52043
1961	A World of Piano!	Contemporary	Trios, with Paul Chambers (b), Philly Joe Jones (d); Sam Jones (b), Louis Hayes (d). S7600
1961–1962	The Great Jazz Piano of Phineas Newborn Jr.	Contemporary	Trios, with Leroy Vinnegar (b), Milt Turner (d); Sam Jones (b), Louis Hayes (d). S-7611
1964	The Newborn Touch	Contemporary	Trio, with Leroy Vinnegar (b), Frank Butler (d). S7615
1969	Please Send Me Someone to Love	Contemporary	Trio, with Ray Brown (b), Elvin Jones (d). S 7622
1969	Harlem Blues	Contemporary	Trio, with Ray Brown (b) and Elvin Jones (d). C 7634 - released 1975
1974	Solo Piano	Atlantic	Solo. SD 1672
1975	Solo	L+R (Germany)	Solo. CDLR 45020 - released 1990
1976	Back Home	Contemporary	Trio, with Ray Brown (b), Elvin Jones (d). C 7648
1976	Look Out - Phineas Is Back!	Pablo	Trio, with Ray Brown (b), Jimmie Smith (d). 2310-801
1977	Phineas Is Genius	Philips (Japan)	Trio, with Allen Jackson (b), Clarence Johnston (d). RJ-7420
1979	Tivoli Encounter	Storyville (Denmark)	Trio, with Jesper Lundgaard (b), Bjarne Rostvold (d). STCD 8221
1986	C Jam Blues	Paddle Wheel (Japan)	Trio, with Ray Brown (b), Marvin "Smitty" Smith (d). 22OR-50511
1987	I've Something to Say	EmArcy (Japan)	Trio, with Jamil Nasser (b) Tony Reedus (d). 20PJ-10148

=== As sideman ===
Year recorded	Leader	Title	Notes
1958	Oscar Pettiford	First Bass	Quintet and trio, with Lee Konitz (as), Zoot Sims (ts), Kenny Clarke (b). Live recordings released 1995 IAJRC CD 1010
1958	Roy Haynes	We Three	Trio, with Paul Chambers (b). New Jazz NJLP 8210
1959	Young Men from Memphis	Down Home Reunion	Octet and quartet, with Booker Little (t), Louis Smith (t), Frank Strozier (as), George Coleman (ts), Calvin Newborn (g), George Joyner (b), Charles Crosby (d). United Artists UAL 4029
1961	Howard McGhee & Teddy Edwards	Together Again!!!!	Quintet, with Ray Brown (b), Ed Thigpen (d). Contemporary M 3588
1961	Howard McGhee	Maggie's Back in Town!!	Quartet, with Leroy Vinnegar (b), Shelly Manne (d). Contemporary M 3596
1961	Helyne Stewart	Love Moods	Quartet, with Teddy Edwards (ts, arr), Leroy Vinnegar (b), Milt Turner (d). Contemporary M 3601
1961	Teddy Edwards	Good Gravy!	Quartet, with Leroy Vinnegar (b), Milt Turner (d). Contemporary M 3592
