= Gus Arnheim =

American pianist (1897–1955)

Gus Arnheim (September 4, 1897 – January 19, 1955) was an American pianist and an early popular band leader. He is noted for writing several songs with his first hit being "I Cried for You" from 1923. He was most popular in the 1920s and 1930s. He also had a few small acting roles.

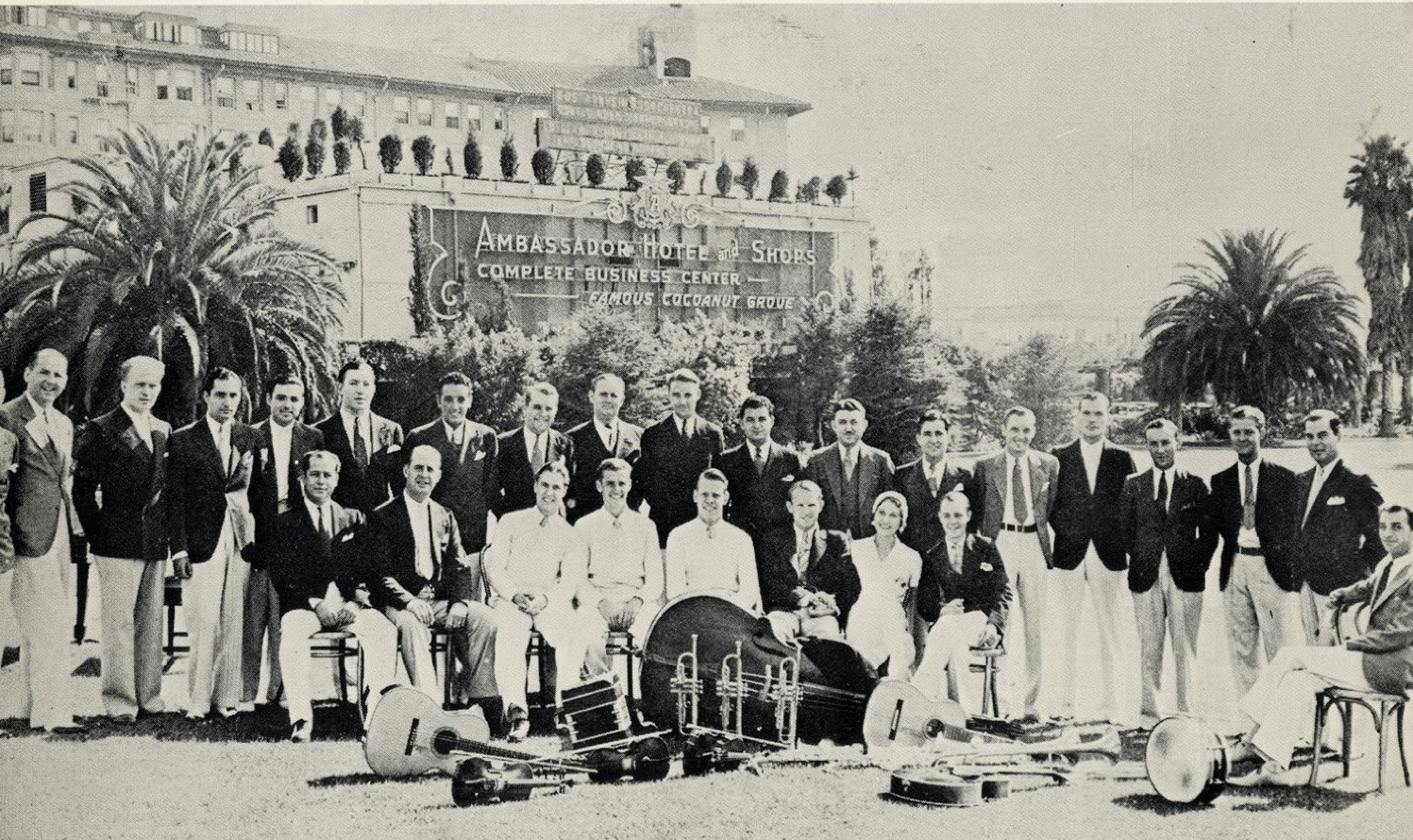
Gus Arnheim Orchestra, Cocoanut Grove at Ambassador Hotel, Los Angeles, 1932

== Career ==
Arnheim was born in Philadelphia, Pennsylvania, United States.

In 1919, three men who all would become famous band leaders played together at the Sunset Inn in Santa Monica, California. Arnheim played piano, Abe Lyman played the drums, and Henry Halstead played violin. Arnheim grew up in Chicago and at one point was accompanist to vaudevillian Sophie Tucker. When Lyman organized a full dance orchestra, Arnheim came along as pianist, leaving to start his own group in 1927. Arnheim's orchestra made at least three film short subjects for Warner Brothers' Vitaphone Corporation in 1928–29.

Arnheim first recorded for OKeh in 1928–1929, when he signed with Victor in 1929 and stayed through 1933. He signed with Brunswick and recorded through 1937. In 1928–31, Arnheim had an extended engagement at the Cocoanut Grove in Los Angeles. In 1930, when Paul Whiteman finished filming The King of Jazz for Universal, The Rhythm Boys vocal trio, consisting of Bing Crosby, Harry Barris and Al Rinker decided to stay in California and they signed up with Arnheim's band. While the Rhythm Boys only recorded one song with Arnheim, "Them There Eyes" (which also happened to be The Rhythm Boys final recording), Arnheim's Orchestra backed Crosby on a number of songs released by Victor Records in 1931. These popular records, coupled with Arnheim's radio broadcasts featuring Crosby's solo vocals, were a key element to the beginning of Crosby's popularity as a crooner.

Between 1930 and 1933, some notable people worked in or with Arnheim's band:

- Fred MacMurray played clarinet and tenor sax in 1930-31 and sang on one recording ("All I Want Is Just One".
- Russ Columbo played violin in 1930 and sang on "A Peach of a Pair".
- Future popular bandleader Jimmie Grier was staff arranger during this time. Grier had played lead alto saxophone and clarinet in Arnheim's band from its founding in 1928.
- Eddie Cantor and Joan Crawford each recorded a song for Arnheim on July 23, 1931, although the Crawford side ("How Long Will It Last?") was not issued. Cantor's side, "There's Nothing Too Good for My Baby," was issued but without vocalist credit.
- Future popular singer Buddy Clark sang with Arnheim in 1932.
- Shirley Ross sang with Arnheim in 1933
- Stan Kenton played piano with Arnheim starting in 1937.

Between 1939 and 1944, Mexican American crooner Andy Russell played the drums and sang with Arnheim. Arnheim was the one who suggested that Russell sing bilingually in English and Spanish and change his last name from Rábago to Russell (in honor of Russ Columbo) leading to his first million-selling record "Bésame Mucho".

Gus Arnheim died of a heart attack in Los Angeles on January 19, 1955.

== Radio ==
In the early 1930s, Arnheim "was heard on the Lucky Strike Dance Hour, which was broadcast weekly on NBC."

== Compositions ==
Arnheim's musical compositions included "Sweet and Lovely".

== Bibliography ==
- Rust, Brian The American Dance Band Discography 1975, Arlington House Publishers.
