= Harry Tobias =

American songwriter

Harry Tobias (September 11, 1895 – December 15, 1994) was an American lyricist. Like his younger brother Charles, he is an inductee of the Songwriters Hall of Fame.

Born in New York City, United States, but raised in Worcester, Massachusetts, part of a prominent Jewish-American family of the Tin Pan Alley songwriters, he began writing songs in his teens. At the age of 19, he co-wrote his first successful songs, "That Girl of Mine" and "Take Me To My Alabam", with Will Dillon. After serving in the US Army, he returned to songwriting, co-writing the 1922 novelty hit, "Oo-oo, Ernest (Are You Earnest With Me?)". He often worked with his brothers Charles and Henry, writing songs with Charles for the Broadway show Earl Carroll's Sketch Book in 1929, and writing Rudy Vallee's hit "Miss You" with both brothers the same year. In 1931, he had success with the song "At Your Command", an early success for Bing Crosby, and also co-wrote "Sweet and Lovely", a hit for Russ Columbo. He wrote or co-wrote the theme songs for many films in the 1930s and 1940s, including One Rainy Afternoon (1936), The Young in Heart (1938), Made for Each Other (1939), If It Wasn't for The Moon (1940) and It's a Date (1940). His many co-writers included Gene Autry.

He died in St Louis, Missouri at age 99 on December 15, 1994. His interment was in Mount Sinai Memorial Park Cemetery.
