= Gotham City (disambiguation) =

Gotham City is a fictional city in DC Comics.

Gotham City may also refer to:

- Gotham City (album)
- "Gotham City" (song)
- Gotham City (themed area), a themed area found at several amusement parks around the world
- Operation Gotham City, a criminal investigation in Brazil
- Gotham City (website), an investigative news website

== See also ==
- Gotham (disambiguation)
