= Hi-Fly (song) =

Composition by Randy Weston

"Hi-Fly" (also sometimes spelled "Hi Fly" or "High Fly") is one of the best known compositions by American jazz pianist Randy Weston, written in the 1950s and inspired by his experience of being 6 feet 8 inches (2.03 m) tall, "and how the ground looks different to you than everybody else". Since first being recorded on 1958's New Faces at Newport, "Hi-Fly" appears on several other albums by Weston, including Live at the Five Spot (1959), Niles Littlebig (1969), Tanjah (1973), Perspective (with Vishnu Wood, 1976), Rhythms and Sounds (1978), Earth Birth (1995), Zep Tepi (2005), and The Storyteller (2009).

Jon Hendricks wrote lyrics to the song, released on 1962's High Flying With Lambert, Hendricks & Ross. Among others who have recorded vocal covers are Abbey Lincoln (on The World Is Falling Down, 1991), Mel Tormé (on 1962's Comin' Home Baby! and other albums), Karin Krog on (Hi-Fly with Archie Shepp) and Sarah Vaughan (In the City of Lights, 1999).

== Selected covers ==
Now a jazz standard, "Hi-Fly" has been recorded in many versions by other leading musicians, including:

- Eddie "Lockjaw" Davis: Smokin′, 1958
- Lambert, Hendricks & Ross: The Hottest New Group in Jazz, 1959
- Art Blakey & the Jazz Messengers: At the Jazz Corner of the World, 1959
- Cannonball Adderley Quintet: The Cannonball Adderley Quintet in San Francisco, featuring Nat Adderley, 1959
- Slide Hampton Octet: Sister Salvation, 1960
- Lambert, Hendricks & Ross: High Flying With L, H & R, 1961
- The Jazztet (Art Farmer and Benny Golson): Big City Sounds, 1961
- Johnny Coles: The Warm Sound, 1961
- Jaki Byard: Hi-Fly, 1962
- Lionel Hampton: Many Splendored Vibes, 1962
- Al Grey: Snap Your Fingers, featuring Billy Mitchell, 1962
- Cannonball Adderley: Phenix, 1975
- Horace Parlan: No Blues, 1975
- Archie Shepp with Karin Krog: Hi-Fly, 1976
- Eric Dolphy: The Berlin Concerts, 1977
- The Great Jazz Trio: At The Village Vanguard Again, 1977
- Horace Parlan: Hi-Fly, 1978
- Dexter Gordon: Gotham City, 1981
- Shelly Manne: Goodbye for Bill Evans, 1981
- Ted Dunbar: Jazz Guitarist, 1982
- George Shearing with Mel Tormé: Top Drawer, 1983
- Peter King: Hi-Fly, 1984
- Monty Alexander: Full Steam Ahead, 1985
- Rio Nido: Hi Fly, 1985
- Max Roach Double Quartet: Bright Moments, 1985
- Donald Byrd: Harlem Blues, 1988
- Art Taylor: Mr. A.T., 1992
- Jimmy Smith: Damn!, 1995
- Ron Carter: So What, 1998
- Ray Bryant: Ray's Tribute to His Jazz Piano Friends, 1998
- Sarah Vaughan: In the City of Lights, 1999
- Ahmad Jamal: A Quiet Time, 2009
- Tom Brantley: Boneyard, 2009
