= Vishnu Wood =

American jazz bassist

William Clifford "Vishnu" Wood (born November 7, 1937), also known as Vishnu Bill Wood, is an American double bass player and educator. Born in Wilkesboro, North Carolina, he moved to Detroit when he was ten, where he started playing trumpet and later taking up double bass. After studying at the Detroit Institute of Musical Arts he worked with Dorothy Ashby in 1957 and then with Yusef Lateef and Joe Henderson.

Wood moved to New York in 1962 where he performed with Kenny Dorham, Carmen McRae, Terry Gibbs (with Gibbs’s group he recorded in 1963 alongside Alice McLeod (who later married John Coltrane), Leo Wright, Gloria Lynn, Roy Haynes, and Archie Shepp.

He then went on to join Randy Weston's sextet, and with whom he toured several countries in Africa, and appears on Randy (1964), Berkshire Blues (recorded 1965 as a trio and released in 1977), Blues (recorded 1964/1965, released 1970), Monterey ‘66 (1966), Blue Moses (1972), Perspective (1976).

In July 1970, Wood played oud at an Alice Coltrane concert, with Pharoah Sanders, Charlie Haden, and Rashied Ali at The Village Gate, New York City, which appeared as a live recording a track of Coltrane's 1971 album Journey in Satchidananda. It was Wood who, a few years earlier, had suggested she meet his guru, Swami Satchidananda, who had given the opening speech at Woodstock.

In 1975, he appeared on Archie Shepp's There's a Trumpet in My Soul.

He released one solo album, Vishnu Wood in Concert, recorded live at the New England Science Center, Worcester, Massachusetts, featuring, among others, Talib Kibwe and Bertha Hope.

== Partial discography ==
- Sathima Bea Benjamin: Songs of Ellington (Ekapa Records, 1978)
- Alberta Hunter: Look for the Silver Lining (Columbia, 1983)
- Randy Weston/Vishnu Wood Duo: Perspectives (Denon DC 8554, 1989)
- Barry Harris, Majeed Grenlee, Roy Brooks: Cadillac & Mack (Toshiba Records)
