= St. Thomas (song) =

1955 song by Sonny Rollins

Song by Sonny Rollins
- Genre: Jazz

"St. Thomas" is among the most recognizable instrumentals in the repertoire of American jazz tenor saxophonist Sonny Rollins. Although Rollins is commonly credited as its composer, the tune is based on the traditional Bahamian folk song "Sponger Money" "Sponger Money" evolved into a nursery song in the Virgin Islands, which Rollins' mother sang to him when he was a child. Rollins noted that the tune bore a resemblance to a Danish folk song called "Det var en lørdag aften", which he believed to be the origin of "Sponger Money".

"St. Thomas" became popular when it was released on Rollins's 1956 album Saxophone Colossus, though the tune had been recorded by pianist Randy Weston in 1955 under the title "Fire Down There", on his Get Happy album.

== Selected discography ==
- Alone Together, Ron Carter and Jim Hall (1972) ("St. Thomas" arranged for acoustic bass and guitar)
- Where There's Smoke, Dallas Original Jazz Orchestra (2009) ("St. Thomas" arranged for big band in 1976 by Gene Glover)
