= Gotham =

Gotham may refer to:

== Places ==
=== United Kingdom ===
- Gotham, Dorset, a hamlet near Verwood, Dorset, England
- Gotham, Nottinghamshire, England

=== United States ===
- New York City; see Nicknames of New York City
- Gotham, Wisconsin

== Media and entertainment ==
=== Film, television and video games ===
- Gotham (film), a 1988 thriller
- Gotham Awards, given for cinema achievement
- Gotham Games, a video game publisher
- Gotham (TV series), a 2014–19 prequel of the Batman franchise

=== Books, magazines and print ===
- Gotham City, fictional home of DC Comics' Batman
- Gotham (magazine), targeted at affluent New Yorkers
- Gotham: A History of New York City to 1898, a 1998 book by American historians Edwin G. Burrows and Mike Wallace
- Gotham Academy, fictional school
- Gotham Books, an imprint of Penguin Books
- Gotham Gazette, a journal in New York City
- "Gotham", a poem by Charles Churchill
- Gotham (character), fictional superhero from DC Comics

=== Music ===
- Gotham (album), 1999 album by Bauhaus
- Gotham City, 1981 album by Dexter Gordon
- Gotham!, 2002 album by the band Radio 4
- Gotham Chamber Opera, opera company in New York City
- Gotham Records, an American rhythm and blues label

== Organizations ==
- Gotham Bar and Grill, a New American restaurant in New York City
- Gotham Book Mart, a bookstore and literary salon in Manhattan
- Gotham Entertainment Group, a South Asian publishing company
- Gotham Writers' Workshop, an adult writing academy
- Gotham Comedy Club, a venue for stand-up comedy in New York City

== People ==
- Gotham Chopra (born 1975), American media entrepreneur and film/TV documentary director, son of author Deepak Chopra
- Nic Gotham (1959–2013), Canadian jazz saxophonist and composer
- Rich Gotham (born 1964), president of the Boston Celtics
- GothamChess, username of American chess YouTuber IM Levy Rozman (born 1995)

== Railways ==
- Gotham, a train operated by Amtrak as part of the Clocker service between Philadelphia and New York City
- Gotham Curve, until 1967 the sharpest curve on a standard gauge railway line in the UK

== Sports teams ==
- Gotham FC, a professional women's soccer club, known as Sky Blue FC prior to 2021 and NJ/NY Gotham FC from 2021–2024
- New York Gothams and Brooklyn Gothams, a team in the American Basketball League
- New York Gothams, the original name of baseball's New York/San Francisco Giants
- Gotham Roller Derby, a flat track roller derby league based in New York City
- Gotham Bowl, a short-lived college football bowl game held in New York City

== Other uses ==
- Gotham (typeface), by designer Tobias Frere-Jones
- Palantir Gotham, a data-mining platform by Palantir Technologies

== See also ==
- Gotham City (disambiguation)
- Gotham Screen Film Festival & Screenplay Contest, a New York City film festival
- Gothem, a settlement on the Swedish island of Gotland
