= Little Niles =

Studio album by Randy Weston
- Released: 1959
- Recorded: October 1958
- Studio: RCA Studios, New York City
- Genre: Jazz
- Label: United Artists; UAL 4011
- Producer: Jack Lewis

Randy Weston chronology
| New Faces at Newport (1958) | Little Niles (1959) | Destry Rides Again (1959) |

Little Niles is an album by American jazz pianist Randy Weston recorded in 1958 and first released on the United Artists label. The album was later released as part of a Blue Note compilation under the same title. All the tracks are Weston originals and, as indicated in the LP's liner notes by Langston Hughes, the album was inspired by Weston's children Niles and Pamela, who are directly referenced in "Little Niles" and "Pam's Waltz" and feature in the cover photograph. As Hughes notes of the compositions, "All in three-quarter time, these charming little vignettes escape rigidity of beat by a fluid flow of counter-rhythms and melodies, one against another, that brings continuous delight."

== Reception ==
Professional ratings
Review scores
| Source | Rating |
|---|---|
| Allmusic | 4.5/5 stars |
| The Rolling Stone Jazz Record Guide | 5/5 stars |

Allmusic awarded the album 4½ stars, with the review by Scott Yanow stating: "Overall the music is advanced bop with a strong nod toward African music. Well worth searching for".

== Track listing ==
All compositions by Randy Weston

1. "Earth Birth" - 2:52
2. "Little Susan" - 3:24
3. "Nice Ice" - 2:55
4. "Little Niles" - 6:00
5. "Pam's Waltz" - 3:15
6. "Babe's Blues" - 6:58
7. "Let's Climb a Hill" - 5:53

== Personnel ==
- Randy Weston - piano
- Ray Copeland (tracks 1–6), Idrees Sulieman (track 7) - trumpet
- Melba Liston - trombone, arranger
- Johnny Griffin - tenor saxophone
- George Joyner - bass
- Charlie Persip - drums
