= Ray Copeland (musician) =

American jazz musician

- Born: July 17, 1926; Norfolk, Virginia, U.S.
- Died: May 18, 1984 (aged 57) Sunderland, Massachusetts, U.S.
- Genre: Jazz
- Instruments: Trumpet

Ray Copeland (July 17, 1926 – May 18, 1984) was an American jazz trumpet player and teacher.

== Early life ==
Copeland was born in Norfolk, Virginia. He studied at Boys High School in the Bedford–Stuyvesant neighborhood of Brooklyn.

== Career ==
Copeland's active career spanned from the 1940s to the 1980s. Throughout his career he participated on many swing and hard bop dates, appearing on Monk's Music by Thelonious Monk recorded in June 1957. Copeland played with a swinging, upbeat approach, but was undoubtedly overshadowed by other top trumpeters of the era such as Lee Morgan and Clifford Brown. He toured with Thelonious Monk in 1968, and appeared at the 1973 Newport Jazz Festival. Later, Copeland was a Music Professor at Hampshire College, teaching jazz composition.

In 1974, he published the book The Ray Copeland Method and Approach to the Creative Art of Jazz Improvisation. Copeland never recorded as a session leader.

== Personal life ==
Copeland's son, Keith Copeland, was a noted jazz drummer. Ray died of a heart attack in 1984 in Sunderland, Massachusetts.

== Discography ==
With Thelonious Monk

- Blue Monk, Vol. 2 (Prestige, 1954)
- Monk (Prestige, 1954)
- We See (Dreyfus, 1954)
- Monk's Music (Riverside, 1957)
- Thelonious Monk with John Coltrane (Riverside, 1957)
- Complete Live at the Five Spot 1958 with John Coltrane (1958)

With Specs Powell

- Movin' In (Roulette, 1957)

With Randy Weston

- The Modern Art of Jazz by Randy Weston (Dawn, 1956)
- Little Niles (United Artists, 1958)
- Highlife (Colpix, 1963)
- Randy (Bakton, 1964) – rereleased in 1972 as African Cookbook (Atlantic)
- Monterey '66 (Verve, 1966)
- Tanjah (Polydor, 1973)

With Jimmy Witherspoon

- Goin' to Kansas City Blues (RCA Victor, 1958) with Jay McShann

With others

- Top Brass, Ernie Wilkins (Savoy, 1955)
- Jazz Spectacular, Frankie Laine (1956)
- Look!, Lionel Hampton (1956)
- Art Blakey Big Band (Bethlehem, 1957)
- The Oscar Pettiford Orchestra in Hi-Fi Volume Two (ABC-Paramount, 1957)
- Dinah Washington Sings Fats Waller, Dinah Washington (1957)
- Sugan, Phil Woods (Status, 1957)
- Cat on a Hot Tin Horn, Cat Anderson (1958)
- Out There, Betty Carter (1958)
- Rites of Diablo, Johnny Richards (1958)
- A Map of Jimmy Cleveland, Jimmy Cleveland (Mercury, 1959)
- Portrait of the Artist, Bob Brookmeyer (Arista, 1960)
- I Can't Help It, Betty Carter (1961)
- Listen to Art Farmer and the Orchestra, Art Farmer (Mercury, 1962)
- Manhattan Latin, Dave Pike (Decca, 1964)
- Booker 'n' Brass, Booker Ervin (Pacific Jazz, 1967)
- Big B-A-D Band in Concert, Live 1970, Clark Terry (1970)
- Attica Blues Big Band, Archie Shepp (1979)
