= Niles Littlebig =

1969 studio album by Randy Weston's African Rhythms

Studio album by Randy Weston's African Rhythms
- Released: 1969
- Recorded: June 1969; Polydor Studios, Paris, France
- Genre: Jazz
- Label: Polydor (France); 658157
- Producer: Henri Belolo and Randy Weston

Randy Weston chronology
African Cookbook (1969)	Niles Littlebig (1969)	Blue Moses (1972)

Niles Littlebig is an album by Randy Weston's African Rhythms recorded in 1969 in Paris, France, and originally released on the French Polydor label.

== Track listing ==
All compositions by Randy Weston except as indicated

1. "Little Niles" - 5:27
2. "Niger Mambo" (Bobby Benson) - 8:54
3. "C.W. Blues" - 5:05
4. "Pam's Waltz" - 3:01
5. "Hi-Fly" - 4:12
6. "Penny Packer Blues" - 4:54
7. "Waltz for Sweet Cakes" - 3:09
8. "Out of the Past" - 3:30

== Personnel ==
- Randy Weston - piano
- Henry Texier - bass
- Art Taylor - drums
- Azzedin Niles Weston, Reebop Kwaku Baah - percussion
- Thierry Maindrault - photography
