= The Spirits of Our Ancestors =

1992 album by pianist Randy Weston

Studio album by Randy Weston
- Released: 1992
- Recorded: 1991
- Genre: Jazz
- Label: Verve

Randy Weston chronology
Self Portraits: The Last Day (1989)	The Spirits of Our Ancestors (1992)	Volcano Blues (1993)

Professional ratings
Review scores
Source	Rating
AllMusic	4.5/5 stars

The Spirits of Our Ancestors is an album by pianist Randy Weston that was recorded in 1991 and issued on the Verve label. While all of the compositions (with the exception of one traditional Moroccan song) were composed by Weston himself, the music on the album is more specifically a collaborative arranging effort between Weston and arranger Melba Liston. The music on Spirits is played by an all-star cast of musicians, including Dizzy Gillespie, Pharoah Sanders, Dewey Redman, Idris Muhammad, and Idrees Sulieman.

Spirits was originally intended to be a grand culmination of Weston's experience living in and absorbing the music of Morocco. The album was to be recorded with the local musicians he had been exposed to on location in Morocco; however, due to the onset of the Gulf War around the time of recording, they decided to relocate to New York City. This change of plans did not affect the authenticity of the music. The main focus of the album, as stated in the liner notes, is to "pay homage to our musical predecessors" and to "celebrate the universal musical language that transcends race, color, and nationality."

== Track listing ==
1. "African Village Bedford-Stuyvesant" 3:21
2. "The Healers" 10:48
3. "African Cookbook" 17:16
4. "La Elaha-Ella Allah/Morad Allah" (traditional) 6:43
5. "The Call" 6:12
6. "African Village Bedford-Stuyvesant 2" 8:30
7. "The Seventh Queen" 16:28
8. "Blue Moses" 12:01
9. "African Sunrise" 19:54
10. "A Prayer For Us All"

== Personnel ==
- Randy Weston - piano (not on 4)
- Idrees Sulieman - trumpet (on 2,3,5,6,7,9)
- Dizzy Gillespie - trumpet (on 9)
- Benny Powell - trombone (on 2,3,5,6,7,9)
- Talib Kibwe - flute, alt sax (on 2,5,6,7,9)
- Billy Harper - tenor sax (on 2,3,5,6,7,9)
- Dewey Redman - tenor sax (on 2,3,5,6,7,9)
- Pharoah Sanders - tenor sax, gaita (on 3 >8)
- Alex Blake - bass (on 2,3,5,6,7,8,9)
- Jamil Nasser - bass (on 2,3,4,5,6,8,9)
- Idris Muhammad - drums (on 2,3,5,6,7,8,9)
- Azzedin Weston - percussion (on 2,3,4,6,9)
- Danny "Big Black" Rey - percussion (on 3,5,6,7,8,9)
- Yassir Chadly - percussion, karkaba, vocal (on 4 >8)

Production

- Randy Weston – arranger, producer, liner notes
- Rhashidah E. McNeill – liner notes
- Yassir Chadly – arranger
- Melba Liston – arranger
- Jean-Philippe Allard – producer
- Brian Bacchus – producer
- Talib Kibwe – musical director
- Jay Newland – engineer
- Joe Lopes – assistant engineer
- Cheung Ching Ming – photography
- Daniel Richard – release preparation
