= Trio and Solo =

Studio album by Randy Weston
- Released: 1957
- Recorded: January 25, 1955 and September 1, 1956
- Studio: Van Gelder Studio, Hackensack, New Jersey and New York City
- Genre: Jazz
- Length: 42:48
- Label: Riverside; RLP 12-227
- Producer: Orrin Keepnews

Randy Weston chronology
With These Hands... (1956)	Trio and Solo (1957)	Jazz à la Bohemia (1956)

Trio and Solo is an album by American jazz pianist Randy Weston recorded in 1955 and 1956 and released on the Riverside label. Six tracks had previously appeared on the 10-inch LP The Randy Weston Trio released in 1955. The album was later released on CD as Solo, Duo & Trio compiled with Weston's 1955 debut recording Cole Porter in a Modern Mood.

== Reception ==
Professional ratings
Review scores
Source	Rating
Allmusic	3/5 stars
The Rolling Stone Jazz Record Guide	4/5 stars

Allmusic awarded the album 3 stars, with the review by Alex Henderson stating: "Trio and Solo isn't as essential as some of Weston's 1960s recordings, but for those who are devoted fans of the pianist, these early performances offer considerable rewards".

== Track listing ==
All compositions by Randy Weston except as indicated

1. "Sweet Sue, Just You" (Will J. Harris, Victor Young) - 3:45
2. "Pam's Waltz" - 3:41
3. "Solemn Meditation" (Sam Gill) - 6:49
4. "Again" (Dorcas Cochran, Lionel Newman) - 5:02
5. "Zulu" - 3:27
6. "If You Could See Me Now" (Tadd Dameron, Carl Sigman) - 3:37
7. "Little Girl Blue" (Lorenz Hart, Richard Rodgers) - 3:54
8. "We'll Be Together Again" (Carl Fischer, Frankie Laine) - 4:08
9. "Softness" - 4:22
10. "Lover" (Hart, Rodgers) - 4:03
- Recorded at Van Gelder Studio in Hackensack, New Jersey on 25 January 1955 (tracks 1–6) and in New York City on 10 September 1956 (tracks 7–10)

== Personnel ==
- Randy Weston - piano
- Sam Gill - bass (tracks 1–5)
- Art Blakey - drums (tracks 1–5)
