= In the City of Lights =

Live album by Sarah Vaughan
- Released: 1999
- Recorded: November 2, 1985
- Venues: Théâtre du Châtelet, Paris
- Genre: Vocal jazz
- Length: 91:09
- Label: Justin Time

In the City of Lights is the title of a live concert date by American jazz diva Sarah Vaughan, performing at the Théâtre du Châtelet in Paris. Recorded in 1985, the album was not released until 1999, almost a decade after Vaughan's death in 1990.

== Reception ==
Professional ratings
Review scores
Source	Rating
Allmusic	4/5 stars

The Allmusic review by Dave Nathan said: "Probably more than any of her contemporaries with whom she is most often compared, Sarah Vaughan's voice not only survived the vicissitudes of years of performing, but matured remarkably well. Her performance at this concert assured all that she could still go from bluesy growls through crystal clarity to sounding cute at the higher range...Vaughan makes a dramatic entrance singing "Summertime" a capella, establishing the vocal framework for the remainder of the concert. Vaughan is fully aware that her voice and persona are special. She is not all reluctant to use them to milk that last droplet of applause from the audience....The 2,500 plus people who attended the Chetelet concert that evening would not let Vaughan leave the stage.".

== Track listing ==
1. "Hi-Fly" (Randy Weston) – 8:23 (instrumental)
2. "Summertime" (George Gershwin, DuBose Heyward) – 2:36
3. "Just Friends" (John Klenner, Sam M. Lewis) – 2:31
4. "Wave" (Antônio Carlos Jobim) – 8:22
5. "On a Clear Day (You Can See Forever)" (Burton Lane, Alan Jay Lerner) – 1:58
6. "If You Could See Me Now" (Tadd Dameron, Carl Sigman) – 6:22
7. "I've Got the World on a String" (Harold Arlen, Ted Koehler) – 3:30
8. "Fascinating Rhythm" (G. Gershwin, Ira Gershwin) – 3:35
9. Medley: "But Not for Me"/"Our Love Is Here to Stay"/"Embraceable You"/"Someone to Watch Over Me" (G. Gershwin, I. Gershwin) – 9:39
10. "There Will Never Be Another You" (Mack Gordon, Harry Warren) – 1:32
11. "Misty" (Johnny Burke, Erroll Garner) – 6:08

Disc Two

1. "My Funny Valentine" (Lorenz Hart, Richard Rodgers) – 8:31
2. "From This Moment On" (Cole Porter) – 3:33
3. "Send in the Clowns" (Stephen Sondheim) – 6:13
4. "Sassy's Blues" (Quincy Jones, Sarah Vaughan) – 4:15
5. "Tenderly" (Walter Gross, Jack Lawrence) – 3:49
6. "Scat Chase (Sassy's Blues)" (Jones, Vaughan) – 6:06
7. "Once in a While" (Michael Edwards, Bud Green) – 4:09

== Personnel ==
=== Performance ===
- Sarah Vaughan – vocals
- Frank Collett – piano
- Bob Maize – double bass
- Harold Jones – drums
