= The Modern Art of Jazz by Randy Weston =

Studio album by Randy Weston
- Released: 1957
- Recorded: November 21 & 22, 1956
- Genre: Jazz
- Length: 39:59
- Label: Dawn; DLP 1116
- Producer: Chuck Darwin

Randy Weston chronology
Jazz à la Bohemia (1956)	The Modern Art of Jazz by Randy Weston (1957)	Piano á la Mode (1957)

The Modern Art of Jazz by Randy Weston (also released as How High the Moon) is a jazz album by American pianist Randy Weston recorded in 1956 and released on the Dawn label.

== Reception ==
Professional ratings
Review scores
Source	Rating
Allmusic	3/5 stars
The Penguin Guide to Jazz Recordings	3/4 stars

Allmusic awarded the album 3 stars, with the review by Scott Yanow stating: "This album does not deserve its obscurity". The All About Jazz review said that "Randy Weston fans should certainly find this album a valuable peek at an early stage of his career".

== Track listing ==
All compositions by Randy Weston except as indicated

1. "Loose Wig" – 3:01
2. "Run Joe" (Louis Jordan, Walter Merrick, Joe Willoughby) – 3:43
3. "A Theme for Teddy" – 5:41
4. "In a Little Spanish Town" (Sam M. Lewis, Mabel Wayne, Joe Young) – 3:01
5. "Don't Blame Me" (Dorothy Fields, Jimmy McHugh) – 5:18
6. "J. K. Blues" – 4:17
7. "Well, You Needn't" (Thelonious Monk) – 5:01
8. "How High the Moon" (Nancy Hamilton, Morgan Lewis) – 4:49
9. "Stormy Weather" (Harold Arlen, Ted Koehler) – 5:08 Bonus track on CD reissue
- Recorded in New York City on November 21 (tracks 2, 4 & 6) and November 22 (tracks 1, 3, 5 & 7–9), 1956

== Personnel ==
- Randy Weston – piano
- Ray Copeland – trumpet (tracks 2, 4 & 6)
- Cecil Payne – alto saxophone, baritone saxophone (tracks 2, 4, 6 & 7)
- Ahmed Abdul-Malik – bass
- Wilbert Hogan (tracks 2, 4 & 6), Willie Jones (tracks 1, 3, 5 & 7–9) – drums
