= With These Hands... =

Studio album by Randy Weston
- Released: 1956
- Recorded: March 14 & 21, 1956
- Studio: Van Gelder Studio, Hackensack, New Jersey
- Genre: Jazz
- Length: 37:52
- Label: Riverside; RLP 12-214
- Producer: Orrin Keepnews, Bill Grauer

Randy Weston chronology
Get Happy with the Randy Weston Trio (1955)	With These Hands... (1956)	Trio and Solo (1955-56)

With These Hands... is a jazz album by American jazz pianist Randy Weston, featuring saxophonist Cecil Payne, which was recorded in 1956 and released on the Riverside label.

== Reception ==
Professional ratings
Review scores
Source	Rating
Allmusic	4/5 stars
The Penguin Guide to Jazz Recordings	3/4 stars

Allmusic awarded the album 4 stars, describing it as being "one of pianist Randy Weston's lesser-known sets".

== Track listing ==
All compositions by Randy Weston except as indicated

1. "The Man I Love" (George Gershwin, Ira Gershwin) – 4:05
2. "Serenade in Blue" (Mack Gordon, Harry Warren) – 2:56
3. "I Can't Get Started" (Vernon Duke, Ira Gershwin) – 8:47
4. "This Can't Be Love" (Lorenz Hart, Richard Rodgers) – 3:02
5. "These Foolish Things" (Harry Link, Holt Marvell, Jack Strachey) – 4:39
6. "Lifetime" – 4:18
7. "Do Nothing till You Hear from Me" (Duke Ellington, Bob Russell) – 5:16
8. "Little Niles" – 4:54

== Personnel ==
- Randy Weston – piano
- Cecil Payne – baritone saxophone (except 2 and 4)
- Ahmed Abdul-Malik – bass
- Wilbert Hogan – drums
