= Uhuru Afrika =

1961 studio album by pianist Randy Weston

Studio album by Randy Weston
- Released: End of April 1961
- Recorded: November 1960
- Studio: Bell Sound, New York City
- Genre: Jazz
- Label: Roulette; R 65001
- Producer: Teddy Reig

Randy Weston chronology
Live at the Five Spot (1959)	Uhuru Afrika (1961)	Highlife (1963)

Uhuru Afrika (subtitled/translated as Freedom Africa) is an album by American jazz pianist Randy Weston recorded in 1960 and originally released on the Roulette label. The album features lyrics and liner notes by the poet Langston Hughes and was banned in South Africa in 1964, at the same time as was Lena Horne's Here's Lena Now! (Max Roach's Freedom Now Suite had been the victim of an earlier banning order), with copies of the albums being seized in Johannesburg and Cape Town.

== Reception ==
Professional ratings
Review scores
Source	Rating
AllMusic	5/5 stars
DownBeat	3.5/5 stars

The contemporaneous DownBeat reviewer, Ira Gitler, commented that the opening movement was too long, that vocalist Peters was poor in the second movement, and that percussion and solos were effective in the third and fourth movements, respectively. AllMusic awarded the album 5 stars, stating: "Uhuru Afrika is one of the finest (and earliest) combinations of African rhythms with advanced jazz and it features Weston utilizing a 24-piece big band".

== Track listing ==
All compositions by Randy Weston except as indicated

1. "Introduction: Uhuru Kwanza" (Langston Hughes) – 2:35
2. "First Movement: Uhuru Kwanza" – 5:49
3. "Second Movement: African Lady" (Weston, Hughes) – 8:27
4. "Third Movement: Bantu" – 8:07
5. "Fourth Movement: Kucheza Blues" – 8:03

== Personnel ==
- Randy Weston – piano
- Clark Terry – trumpet, flugelhorn
- Benny Bailey, Richard Williams, Freddie Hubbard – trumpet
- Slide Hampton, Jimmy Cleveland, Quentin Jackson – trombone
- Julius Watkins – French horn
- Gigi Gryce – alto saxophone, flute
- Yusef Lateef – tenor saxophone, flute, oboe
- Sahib Shihab – alto saxophone, baritone saxophone
- Budd Johnson – tenor saxophone, clarinet
- Jerome Richardson – baritone saxophone, piccolo
- Cecil Payne – baritone saxophone
- Les Spann – guitar, flute
- Kenny Burrell – guitar
- George Duvivier, Ron Carter – bass
- Max Roach, Charlie Persip – drums, percussion
- Wilbert Hogan – drums
- Candido Camero – congas
- Babatunde Olatunji – percussion
- Armando Peraza – bongos
- Martha Flowers, Brock Peters – vocals
- Tuntemeke Sanga – narrator
- Melba Liston – arranger
