= Sonny Rollins and the Big Brass =

1958 studio album by Sonny Rollins

Studio album by Sonny Rollins
- Released: 1958
- Recorded: July 10 & 11, 1958
- Studios: Beltone Studios and Metropolitan Studios, NYC
- Genre: Jazz
- Length: 34:24
- Labels: MetroJazz; E 1002
- Producer: Leonard Feather

Sonny Rollins chronology
Freedom Suite (1958)	Sonny Rollins and the Big Brass (1958)	Sonny Rollins at Music Inn (1958)

Brass/Trio Cover

Sonny Rollins and the Big Brass is a 1958 album by jazz saxophonist Sonny Rollins, recorded for the MetroJazz label, later reissued on Verve Records as Sonny Rollins/Brass - Sonny Rollins/Trio.

One side of the original LP featured performances by Rollins with a big band including Nat Adderley, Reunald Jones, Ernie Royal, Clark Terry, Billy Byers, Jimmy Cleveland, Frank Rehak, Don Butterfield, Dick Katz, René Thomas and Roy Haynes, which was under the musical direction of Ernie Wilkins, and the other side had three tracks by Rollins' trio with Henry Grimes and Specs Wright and an unaccompanied solo performance.

== Reception ==
Professional ratings
Review scores
Source	Rating
Allmusic	4/5 stars
AllMusic	3/5 stars
The Rolling Stone Jazz Record Guide	4/5 stars
The Penguin Guide to Jazz Recordings	3.5/4 stars

The AllMusic review by Ken Dryden states: "Big Brass is an appropriate name for the large ensemble arranged and conducted by Ernie Wilkins that accompanies the huge sound of Sonny Rollins. The energy within the leader's gospel-flavored shout 'Grand Street' is considerable, while a swinging but no less powerful version of George & Ira Gershwin's 'Who Cares' features a choice solo by guitarist Rene Thomas. Also added to this compilation are trio recordings with bassist Henry Grimes and drummer Specs Wright, including a brilliant leisurely stroll through 'Manhattan,' along with Rollins' tour de force unaccompanied tenor sax on 'Body and Soul'". Scott Yanow said: "Rollins excels in both of these settings, making this an easily recommended set."

== Track listing ==
1. "Who Cares?" (Ira Gershwin, George Gershwin) – 3:55
2. "Love Is a Simple Thing" (June Carroll, Arthur Siegel) – 3:00
3. "Grand Street" (Sonny Rollins) – 6:02
4. "Far Out East" (Ernie Wilkins) – 4:30
5. "What's My Name?" (David Saxon, Robert Wells) – 3:44
6. "If You Were the Only Girl in the World" (Nat Ayer, Clifford Grey) – 5:08
7. "Manhattan" (Lorenz Hart, Richard Rodgers) – 4:28
8. "Body and Soul" (Frank Eyton, Johnny Green, Edward Heyman, Robert Sour) – 4:17
- Recorded at Beltone Recording Studios, NYC on July 10, 1958 (tracks 5–8) and Metropolitan Studios, NYC on July 11, 1958 (tracks 1–4)

== Personnel ==
- Sonny Rollins – tenor saxophone
- Nat Adderley – cornet (tracks 1–4)
- Reunald Jones, Ernie Royal, Clark Terry – trumpet (tracks 1–4)
- Billy Byers, Jimmy Cleveland, Frank Rehak – trombone (tracks 1–4)
- Don Butterfield – tuba (tracks 1–4)
- Dick Katz – piano (tracks 1–4)
- René Thomas – guitar (tracks 1–4)
- Henry Grimes – bass – (tracks 1–7)
- Roy Haynes (tracks 1–4), Specs Wright (tracks 5–7) – drums
- Ernie Wilkins – arranger, conductor (tracks 1–4)
