= Sonny Rollins at Music Inn/Teddy Edwards at Falcon's Lair =

Live album by Sonny Rollins/Teddy Edwards
- Released: 1958
- Recorded: August 31, 1958, and unknown 1958 date
- Venue: Music Inn, Lenox, MA and Falcon's Lair, Beverly Hills, CA
- Genre: Jazz
- Length: 40:27
- Label: MetroJazz; E 1011
- Producer: Leonard Feather

Sonny Rollins chronology
| Sonny Rollins and the Big Brass (1958) | Sonny Rollins at Music Inn/Teddy Edwards at Falcon's Lair (1958) | Sonny Rollins and the Contemporary Leaders (1958) |

Teddy Edwards chronology
| Teddy Edwards at Falcon's Lair (1958) | It's About Time (1959) |

Sonny Rollins at Music Inn/Teddy Edwards at Falcon's Lair is a live split album featuring saxophonists Sonny Rollins and Teddy Edwards, recorded for the MetroJazz label in 1958.

== Reception ==
Professional ratings
Review scores
| Source | Rating |
|---|---|
| AllMusic | 3/5 stars |
| DownBeat | 2.5/5 stars |

On Jazz Views, Jack Kenny wrote: "[A]lthough Rollins only plays on half of the tracks the CD is well worth hearing because he is at his best and at times his sardonic side almost sounds as though he wanted to prick the pretensions of the MJQ. There was never much humour with the MJQ but there is plenty of musical fun with Rollins. Yes, the CD is a mish-mash but if you don’t have the Rollins tracks they are well worth acquiring. I am sure the Teddy Edwards’ groupies will be pleased with the final two tracks."

== Track listing ==
1. "Doxy" (Sonny Rollins) – 7:58
2. "Limehouse Blues" (Philip Braham, Douglas Furber) – 6:32
3. "I'll Follow My Secret Heart" (Noël Coward) – 5:31
4. "You Are Too Beautiful" (Richard Rodgers, Lorenz Hart) – 6:07
5. "Billie's Bounce" (Charlie Parker) – 6:34
6. "A Foggy Day" (George Gershwin, Ira Gershwin) – 7:45
- Recorded at the Music Inn, Lenox, MA, on August 31, 1958 (tracks 1–4), and at Falcon's Lair in Beverly Hills, CA in 1958 (tracks 5 & 6)

== Personnel ==
- Sonny Rollins (tracks 1–4), Teddy Edwards (tracks 5 & 6) – tenor saxophone
- John Lewis (tracks 1 & 4), Joe Castro (tracks 5 & 6) – piano
- Percy Heath (tracks 1–4), Leroy Vinnegar (tracks 5 & 6) – bass
- Connie Kay (tracks 1–4), Billy Higgins (tracks 5 & 6) – drums
