= Get Happy with the Randy Weston Trio =

Studio album by Randy Weston
- Released: Early February 1956
- Recorded: August 29 & 31, 1955
- Studio: Van Gelder Studio, Hackensack, New Jersey
- Genre: Jazz
- Label: Riverside; RLP 12-203
- Producer: Orrin Keepnews, Bill Grauer

Randy Weston chronology
The Randy Weston Trio (1955)	Get Happy with the Randy Weston Trio (1956)	With These Hands... (1956)

Get Happy with the Randy Weston Trio is a jazz album by American jazz pianist Randy Weston recorded in 1955 and released on the Riverside label.

== Reception ==
Professional ratings
Review scores
Source	Rating
AllMusic	2.5/5 stars
The Rolling Stone Jazz Record Guide	3/5 stars
The Penguin Guide to Jazz Recordings	3/4 stars

The AllMusic review by Jim Todd stated: "This early release from Randy Weston finds the pianist still in his formative stages... The set shows Weston's facility with standards, Ellingtonia, even ragtime, but, with several tracks coming in well under four minutes, the performances offer little room for development. The impression here is that of a pianist of great potential limbering up before the curtain rises for the show".

== Track listing ==
All compositions by Randy Weston, except as indicated

1. "Get Happy" (Harold Arlen, Ted Koehler) - 3:42
2. "Fire Down There" (Traditional) - recorded by Sonny Rollins and others as "St. Thomas" - 2:51
3. "Where Are You?" (Harold Adamson, Jimmy McHugh) - 4:09
4. "Under Blunder" - 3:06
5. "Dark Eyes" (Florian Hermann) - 3:34
6. "Summertime" (George Gershwin, Ira Gershwin, DuBose Heyward) - 3:56
7. "Bass Knows" - 5:15
8. "C Jam Blues" (Barney Bigard, Duke Ellington) - 2:49
9. "A Ballad" (Sam Gill) - 4:20
10. "Twelfth Street Rag" (Euday L. Bowman) - 2:59

== Personnel ==
- Randy Weston - piano
- Sam Gill - bass
- Wilbert Hogan - drums
