= T. K. Blue =

Jazz musician, musical director, composer, and educator (born 1953)

- Also known as: Talib Kibwe; Talib Qadir Kibwe (variations: Talib Qadr, Talib Abdul Kadr, Talib Abdul Qadr, Talib Qadir); Talib Rhynie
- Born: Eugene Rhynie; February 7, 1953 (age 73); Bronx, New York, U.S.
- Origin: New York City
- Genres: Jazz
- Occupations: Musician, musical director, composer, educator
- Instruments: Saxophone, flute
- Years active: 1977–present
- Label: Motéma Music
- Website: tkblue.com
- Education: New York University; Columbia University

Eugene Rhynie (born February 7, 1953), known professionally as T. K. Blue (or Talib Kibwe and other variants), is an American jazz saxophonist, flautist, composer and educator from New York City. His parents were Jamaican and Trinidadian, and he has used their Afro-Caribbean musical styles in his own work. He has worked with, among others, Don Cherry, Jayne Cortez, the South African pianist Dollar Brand (now Abdullah Ibrahim), and Randy Weston, for whom he was musical director.

Blue has also taught at professorial level of jazz studies at educational institutions including Suffolk Community College, Montclair State University, and Long Island University.

== Biography ==
=== Early years and education ===
He was born in the Bronx, New York, United States, to a Trinidadian mother and Jamaican father, and grew up on Long Island, NY. T.K. Blue began his life in music from his Lakeview hometown by playing trumpet from the ages of eight to 10, and then switching to drums for a year. After a hiatus, at the age of 17 he dedicated himself to music by learning flute. He won a full scholarship to New York University, and while attending there between 1971 and 1975, with a double major in Music and Psychology, Blue threw himself headlong into music, concentrating on the saxophone.

During these undergraduate years, he lived in the East Village, partaking in the full range of the scene, from lessons with elders to deep involvement in the avant-garde. He participated in the Jazzmobile program, studying jazz theory, harmony, sight-reading, rhythmic training, improvisation and big-band performance, with Jimmy Heath, Chris Woods, Sonny Red, Frank Foster, Jimmy Owens, Ernie Wilkins, Thad Jones and Billy Taylor. At Jazz Interactions, Blue studied with Rahsaan Roland Kirk, Yusef Lateef and Joe Newman, and at the Henry Street Settlement with Billy Mitchell and bassist Paul West. In 1979, Blue received his Master's degree in Music Education from Teachers College at Columbia University.

=== Career ===
After performing and traveling extensively with Abdullah Ibrahim (Dollar Brand) from 1977 to 1980 – variously billed during this period as Talib Qadr, Talib Qadir Kibwe and Talib Abdul Kadr – Blue moved to Paris in December 1981, remaining there until 1989. In 1986, he recorded Egyptian Oasis, his first record as a leader, and that sparked a number of State Department tours to some 20 countries in Africa.

Back in the USA since 1990, he has worked constantly, in a wide range of styles and situations, and recorded his second CD, Introducing Talib Kibwe, released on Evidence in 1996. His more recent recordings as leader include 2008's Follow the North Star, a suite inspired by the life of Solomon Northup (a "compelling opus", commissioned by the New York State Council on the Arts), Latin Bird (2011 – "Highly recommended" by AllMusic's reviewer Ken Dryden), and in 2014 A Warm Embrace, about which Don Bilawsky on All About Jazz has written: "Blue's skills as an arranger, perhaps more than anything else, are responsible for the success of this project, as he's able to create beauty from simplicity at times.... A Warm Embrace is simply a beautiful work of art."

His 2019 album The Rhythms Continue is a tribute to Randy Weston, with whose group T. K. Blue worked from the 1980s, taking on the role of music director and arranger in 1989. The New York City Jazz Record characterized the CD as "possibly his most heartfelt, a dedication to the memory of his longtime employer and mentor. ... Blue performed in Weston's African Rhythms band for 38 years, his life deeply affected by his relationship with the legendary pianist." Described by the New York Amsterdam News as "a memorable suite of 19 enthralling compositions by Weston, Melba Liston and Blue", it features other members of Weston's band – bassist Alex Blake, tenor saxophonist Billy Harper, and percussionist Neil Clarke – with guest pianists Sharp Radway, Mike King, Keith Brown and Kelly Green, as well as Min Xiao Fen on pipa.

Augmenting his long-term relationships as musical director with Weston, as well as with the Spirit of Life Ensemble at New York's Sweet Basil jazzclub, Blue's other recent affiliations include: Odadaa, a group led by a drummer from Ghana, Yacub Addy; percussionist Norman Hedman's pan-African band Tropique; tap dancer Joseph's Tap and Rap, to jazz tunes by Charlie Parker and John Coltrane; and emerging singer Jeffrey Smith.

T. K. Blue was part of the June 2008 photo session called "A Great Day In Paris" — in homage to Art Kane's historic 1958 photograph A Great Day in Harlem — that featured more than 50 musicians from the USA who resided there.

For several years an adjunct professor at Suffolk Community College and Montclair State University, Blue was also a full-time professor and director of jazz studies at Long Island University-LIU-Post.

The 2023 release of The Tide of Love earned Blue acclaim from such outlets as All About Jazz, where the reviewer hailed it as "a striking album ... that offers a diverse and engaging musical journey through various genres of the jazz spectrum", and concluded: "The album shows T.K. Blue's skill, passion, and commitment to musical diversity."

Blue's most recent album, Planet Bluu, was released in October 2024 to further positive reviews, described by The Arts Fuse as a "multigenerational affair...a fun and engaging listen as the seasoned pros pass the tradition to the next generation." DownBeat magazine's reviewer called Planet Bluu "so special", giving it a four-star rating, while The Toledo Blade praised it by noting: "It includes a wonderful mix of musicians and a diverse array of instruments while maintaining its tight, jazz combo feel....DownBeat magazine once wrote that Blue 'exudes armloads of dexterity and guileless charm' and that he 'is a craftsman so in love with his work that it doesn’t even feel like work.' That's a pretty apt description for this album, which is complex in arrangements, filled with fascinating solos, and yet flows effortlessly."

== Discography ==
=== As leader ===
- 1986: Egyptian Oasis (Anais Records)
- 1993: Taja – A Night at Birdland (Rise Up; B000005R1G)
- 1996: Introducing Talib Kibwe (Evidence)
- 1999: Another Blue (Arkadia Jazz)
- 2001: Eyes of the Elders, with Randy Brecker, Joanne Brackeen, Lonnie Plaxico and Jeff "Tain" Watts (Arkadia Records)
- 2003: Rhythm in Blue (Jaja Records)
- 2007: In a Sentimental Mood: A Jazz Tribute to Dr Chris Culver (T.K. Blue)
- 2008: Follow the North Star, with Steve Turre, James Weidman, Onaje Allan Gumbs, Essiet Okon Essiet, Willie Martinez and Kevin Jones (a musical retelling of the story of Solomon Northup (Jaja Records)
- 2010: C.W. Post Jazz
- 2011: Latin Bird (Motéma Music)
- 2013: Live at Hillwood Recital Hall
- 2014: A Warm Embrace (Jaja Records)
- 2017: Amour (Dot Time Records)
- 2019: The Rhythms Continue (Jaja Records)
- 2023: The Tide of Love (Arkadia Records)
- 2024: Planet Bluu (Jaja Records)

=== As sideman ===
With Arkadia Jazz All-Stars

- Thank You, Duke! Our Tribute to Duke Ellington (1998)

With Jayne Cortez and The Firespitters

- Cheerful and Optimistic (1995)
- Taking the Blues Back Home (1996)
- Borders of Disorderly Time (2003)

With Abdullah Ibrahim

- The Journey (Chiaroscuro Records, 1977; as Talib Rhynie)
- Africa – Tears and Laughter (Enja Records, 1979; as Talib Qadr)
- Liberation – South African Freedom Songs (safco Records, 1979; as Talib Abdul Qadr)

With Benny Powell

- Why Don’t You Say Yes Sometime (1991)
- The Gift of Love (2003)
- Nextep (2008)

With Sam Rivers

- Colours (Black Saint, 1982)

With Jimmy Scott

- All of Me: Live in Tokyo (Venus Records, 2004)

With The Spirit of Life Ensemble

- Inspiration (1992)
- Feel the Spirit (1994)
- Live at the Pori Jazz Festival (1996)
- Collage (1998)
- 25 Twenty-Five (2000)

With Randy Weston

- The Spirits of Our Ancestors (1991)
- Volcano Blues (1993)
- Saga (1995)
- Khepera (1998)
- Spirit! The Power of Music (2000)
- The African Nubian Suite (2016)
