= New Faces at Newport =

Live album by Randy Weston / Lem Winchester
- Released: 1958
- Recorded: July 5, 1958
- Venue: Newport Jazz Festival, Newport, Rhode Island
- Genre: Jazz
- Label: MetroJazz; E 1005

Randy Weston chronology
Piano á la Mode (1957)	New Faces at Newport (1958)	Little Niles (1958)

New Faces at Newport is a split album by pianist Randy Weston's trio and vibraphonist Lem Winchester's quartet which was recorded in 1958 at the Newport Jazz Festival and released on the MetroJazz label.

== Reception ==
Professional ratings
Review scores
Source	Rating
Allmusic	3/5 stars

Allmusic awarded the album 3 stars.

== Track listing ==
All compositions by Randy Weston, except as indicated'

1. "Hi-Fly" - 6:38
2. "Excerpt from Bantu Suite" - 9:27
3. "Beef Blues Stew" - 6:33
4. "Machine Blues" - 4:35
5. "Now's the Time" (Charlie Parker)
6. "Polka Dots and Moonbeams" (Jimmy Van Heusen, Johnny Burke)
7. "Take the "A" Train" (Billy Strayhorn)

== Personnel ==
- Randy Weston - piano (tracks 1–4)
- George Joyner - bass (tracks 1–4)
- Wilbert Hogan - drums (tracks 1–4)
- Lem Winchester - vibraphone (tracks 5–7)
- Ray Santisi - piano (tracks 5–7)
- John Neves - bass (tracks 5–7)
- Jimmy Zitano - drums (tracks 5–7)
