= Piano á la Mode =

Studio album by Randy Weston
- Released: 1959
- Recorded: Spring 1957
- Studio: Beltone Studios, New York City
- Genre: Jazz
- Label: Jubilee; JLP 1060
- Producer: Lee Kraft

Randy Weston chronology
The Modern Art of Jazz by Randy Weston (1956)	Piano á la Mode (1959)	New Faces at Newport (1958)

Piano á la Mode is an album by American jazz pianist Randy Weston which was recorded in 1957 and released on the Jubilee label.

== Reception ==
Professional ratings
Review scores
Source	Rating
Allmusic	4/5 stars

Allmusic awarded the album 4 stars.

== Track listing ==
All compositions by Randy Weston except as indicated

1. "Earth Birth" - 5:10
2. "Nobody Knows the Trouble I've Seen" (Traditional) - 3:14
3. "Saucer Eyes" - 4:18
4. "I Got Rhythm" (George Gershwin, Ira Gershwin) - 5:20
5. "Gingerbread" - 2:54
6. "Cocktails for Two" (Sam Coslow, Arthur Johnston) - 3:35
7. "Honeysuckle Rose" (Andy Razaf, Fats Waller) - 6:26
8. "FE-Double-U-Blues" - 5:34

== Personnel ==
- Randy Weston - piano
- John A. "Peck" Morrison - bass
- Connie Kay - drums
