= The Randy Weston Trio =

Studio album by Randy Weston
- Released: 1955
- Recorded: January 25, 1955
- Studio: Van Gelder Studio, Hackensack, New Jersey
- Genre: Jazz
- Length: 26:21
- Label: Riverside; RLP 2515
- Producer: Orrin Keepnews

Randy Weston chronology
Cole Porter in a Modern Mood (1954)	The Randy Weston Trio (1955)	Get Happy with the Randy Weston Trio (1955)

The Randy Weston Trio is a jazz album by American jazz pianist Randy Weston recorded in 1955 and originally released on the Riverside label as a 10–inch LP. The tracks were later released on the 12–inch LP Trio and Solo with additional solo recordings from 1956.

== Reception ==
Professional ratings
Review scores
Source	Rating
Allmusic	3/5 stars

Allmusic awarded the album 3 stars.

== Track listing ==
All compositions by Randy Weston except as indicated

1. "Zulu" – 3:27
2. "Pam's Waltz" – 3:41
3. "Solemn Meditation" (Sam Gill) – 6:49
4. "Again" (Dorcas Cochran, Lionel Newman) – 5:02
5. "If You Could See Me Now" (Tadd Dameron, Carl Sigman) – 3:37
6. "Sweet Sue, Just You" (Will J. Harris, Victor Young) – 3:45

== Personnel ==
- Randy Weston – piano
- Sam Gill – bass (tracks 1–4 & 6)
- Art Blakey – drums (tracks 1–4 & 6)
