= Randy (album) =

1964 studio album by pianist Randy Weston

Studio album by Randy Weston
- Released: 1964
- Recorded: October 1964
- Studio: Nola Penthouse Studios, New York City
- Genre: Jazz
- Length: 35:21
- Label: Bakton BR 1001; Atlantic SD 1609
- Producer: Donald Elfman, Naomi Yodhii

Randy Weston chronology
Highlife (1963)	Randy (1964)	Berkshire Blues (1965)

African Cookbook Cover

Randy (subtitled Băp!! Beep Boo-Bee Băp Beep-M-Boo Bee Băp!) is an album by American jazz pianist Randy Weston recorded in 1964 and originally released on Bakton, Weston's own label. The album was later reissued in 1972 on the Atlantic label under the title African Cookbook.

== Reception ==
Professional ratings
Review scores
Source	Rating
Allmusic	4/5 stars

Allmusic awarded the album 4 stars, stating: "When this set was recorded in 1964, pianist Randy Weston had no luck interesting any label to release the music, so he came out with it independently on his tiny Bakton company... It is surprising that no company in the mid-1960s signed Weston up because "Willie's Tune" from the set had the potential to catch on, "Berkshire Blues" is somewhat known and the mixture of accessible bop with African rhythms overall is appealing... An excellent outing."

== Track listing ==
All compositions by Randy Weston except as indicated

1. "Berkshire Blues" – 4:55
2. "Portrait of Vivian" – 3:43
3. "Willie's Tune" – 4:06
4. "Niger Mambo" (Bobby Benson) – 5:21
5. "African Cookbook" – 12:14
6. "Congolese Children" – 2:07
7. "Blues for Five Reasons" – 3:07

== Personnel ==
- Randy Weston – piano, celeste
- Ray Copeland – trumpet, flugelhorn, arranger (tracks 1–6)
- Booker Ervin – tenor saxophone (tracks 1–6)
- Vishnu Bill Wood – bass
- Lennie McBrowne – drums
- Big Black – percussion, vocals (tracks 4–6)
- Harold Murray – percussion (tracks 4–6)
