= Volcano Blues =

1993 album by Randy Weston and Melba Liston

Studio album by Randy Weston and Melba Liston
- Released: 1993
- Recorded: February 5–6, 1993
- Studio: BMG Studios, New York City
- Genre: Jazz
- Length: 53:28
- Label: Antilles, Verve, Gitanes; 519 269-2

Randy Weston chronology
The Spirits of Our Ancestors (1992)	Volcano Blues (1993)	Monterey '66 (1994)

Melba Liston chronology
Melba Liston and Her 'Bones (1959)	Volcano Blues (1993)

Volcano Blues is an album by pianist Randy Weston and Melba Liston, who arranged and conducted most of the music. It was recorded on February 5 and 6, 1993, at BMG Studios in New York City, and was released later that year by Antilles Records, Verve Records and Gitanes Jazz Productions. On the album, Weston and Liston are joined by saxophonists Talib Kibwe, Teddy Edwards, and Hamiet Bluiett, trumpeter Wallace Roney, trombonist Benny Powell, guitarist Ted Dunbar, double bassist Jamil Nasser, drummer Charlie Persip, and percussionists Obo Addy and Neil Clarke. Guitarist and vocalist Johnny Copeland also appears on two tracks.

== Reception ==
Professional ratings
Review scores
Source	Rating
AllMusic	4.5/5 stars
The Penguin Guide to Jazz	3.5/4 stars
The Rolling Stone Jazz & Blues Album Guide	5/5 stars
The Virgin Encyclopedia of Jazz	3/5 stars

In a review for AllMusic, Ron Wynn wrote: "Liston's arrangements required disciplined solos, and Weston's steady hand generated impressive cohesion and interaction during the unison segments. A superb example of the African/African-American musical continuum."

Critic Gary Giddins called the album "blithely entertaining" and "a chameleonic celebration of the twelve-bar sonnet that provokes and amuses and deepens with every hearing."

A reviewer for the Chicago Tribune noted "the communicative appeal of this music," and stated: "Volcano Blues will remind listeners that there's more to blues expression than the skeletal, four-chord pattern that has sold millions of pop records around the world. Complexly layered rhythms, a subtle sense of swing, intricate orchestration, melody evoking ancient Africa-all of these elements express the spirit of the blues, as this album attests."

Reuben Jackson of The Washington Post commented: "Although a good deal has been written about the influence of the blues on jazz, few musicians associated with either genre have explored the countless rhythmic, melodic and textural possibilities inherent in the former as fearlessly and successfully as pianist Randy Weston." He praised the rendition of "Harvard Blues", in which Copeland's "alternatively seductive and grainy voice describes the difficulty of juggling scholarship and romance, sentiments echoed by the cooing solo of trombonist Benny Powell."

The authors of The Penguin Guide to Jazz Recordings acknowledged the presence of "a firm hand in the arranging department," and wrote: "Liston takes control, rightly gaining a joint authorship credit... This is by no means a typical Weston record, and it's slightly difficult to locate vis-à-vis the rest. That shouldn't stop anyone sampling it. however."

Writing for the Los Angeles Times, Richard Guilliatt described the album as "a spiritual heir of sorts" to Weston's 1991 release The Spirits of Our Ancestors, and remarked: "Volcano Blues traces the bloodlines of the blues from Africa to the Caribbean, the Mississippi Delta, the Kansas City big bands of Count Basie and on to New York... he approaches the blues with a wide vision."

== Track listing ==
1. "Blue Mood" (Jessie Mae Robinson) – 2:42
2. "Chalabati Blues" (Randy Weston) – 6:02
3. "Sad Beauty Blues" (Randy Weston) – 3:18
4. "The Nafs" (Randy Weston) – 2:33
5. "Volcano" (Count Basie) – 2:25
6. "Harvard Blues" (Count Basie, George Frazier, Tab Smith) – 4:09
7. "In Memory Of" (Randy Weston) – 5:09
8. "Blues for Strayhorn" (Randy Weston) – 3:46
9. "Penny Packer Blues" (Randy Weston) – 4:12
10. "J.K. Blues" (Randy Weston) – 2:25
11. "Mystery of Love" (Guy Warren) – 6:22
12. "Kucheza Blues" (Randy Weston) – 7:17
13. "Blues for Elma Lewis" (Randy Weston) – 3:08

== Personnel ==
- Randy Weston – piano
- Melba Liston – conductor (tracks 2–10, 13)
- Talib Kibwe – flute, alto saxophone
- Teddy Edwards – tenor saxophone
- Hamiet Bluiett – baritone saxophone
- Wallace Roney – trumpet
- Benny Powell – trombone
- Ted Dunbar – guitar
- Johnny Copeland – guitar, vocals (tracks 1, 6)
- Jamil Nasser – double bass
- Charlie Persip – drums
- Obo Addy – percussion
- Neil Clarke – percussion
