= Khepera (album) =

1998 studio album by pianist Randy Weston

Studio album by Randy Weston
- Released: 1998
- Recorded: March 1998
- Genre: Jazz
- Label: Verve
- Producers: Randy Weston, Brian Bacchus

Randy Weston chronology
Earth Birth (1997)	Khepera (1998)	Spirit! The Power of Music (1999)

Khepera is an album by the American pianist Randy Weston, released in 1998. The album was in part an exploration of the connection between African and Chinese cultures. It is dedicated to the Senegalese historian Cheikh Anta Diop. Khepera is Egyptian for transformation.

== Production ==
Recorded in March 1998, the album was produced by Weston and Brian Bacchus. Min Xiao-Fen played the gong and pipa on two tracks. Talib Kibwe played alto sax and flute; Benny Powell played trombone. Melba Liston help to arrange the music. Weston played many songs in 6/8 time.

== Critical reception ==
Professional ratings
Review scores
Source	Rating
AllMusic	4/5 stars
Birmingham Post	5/5 stars
The Encyclopedia of Popular Music	4/5 stars
Los Angeles Times	3.5/4 stars
MusicHound World: The Essential Album Guide	4.5/5 stars
The Sydney Morning Herald	5/5 stars

JazzTimes praised Weston's "uncanny ability to re-craft, to maintain freshness in melodies and rhythms he has investigated frequently, such as the familiar 'Niger Mambo'." The Washington Post noted that "an Ellingtonian elegance marks the massed horns of the swinging 'Portrait of Cheikh Anta Diop'." The Sydney Morning Herald stated that "the music has a breadth and density of emotion, spirituality, colour and creativity that push it towards masterpiece stature."

The Globe and Mail concluded that "Min's performances aren't quite curios, but they're not a lot more either, one a sweet but inconclusive pipa-piano duet and the other a nonet piece in which she makes only a buzzy cameo appearance." The Los Angeles Times applauded the "particularly effective linkage" of Powell and Pharoah Sanders. The National Post deemed Khepera "a fiendishly clever romp through African rhythms, Chinese melodies and '60s jazz tonalities."

AllMusic called the album "a powerful, even visionary piece of work for any musician," writing that Sanders is "in thrilling form throughout much of the album."

== Track listing ==
No.	Title	Length
1.	"Creation"
2.	"Anu Anu"
3.	"The Shrine"
4.	"The Shang"
5.	"Prayer Blues"
6.	"Boran Xam Xam"
7.	"Portrait of Cheikh Anta Diop"
8.	"Niger Mambo"
9.	"Mystery of Love"
