= Jazz à la Bohemia =

Live album by The Randy Weston Trio with Cecil Payne
- Released: 1956
- Recorded: 14 October 1956
- Venue: Café Bohemia; Greenwich Village, NYC
- Genre: Jazz
- Length: 45:13
- Label: Riverside; RLP 12-232
- Producer: Orrin Keepnews, Bill Grauer

Randy Weston chronology
Trio and Solo (1955–56)	Jazz à la Bohemia (1956)	The Modern Art of Jazz by Randy Weston (1956)

Jazz à la Bohemia (also released as Greenwich Village Jazz) is a live album by American jazz pianist Randy Weston recorded on October 14, 1956, at the Café Bohemia in Greenwich Village and released on Riverside later that year.

== Reception ==
Professional ratings
Review scores
Source	Rating
AllMusic	4.5/5 stars
The Penguin Guide to Jazz Recordings	3.5/4 stars

Scott Yanow of AllMusic said, "Randy Weston, who was more under Thelonious Monk's influence back in 1956 than he would be in the near future, is in top form during this live set."

== Track listing ==
1. "Theme: Solemn Meditation" (Sam Gill) – 0:45
2. "Just a Riff" (Sid Catlett) – 9:50
3. "You Go to My Head" (J. Fred Coots, Haven Gillespie) – 6:10
4. "Once in a While" (Michael Edwards, Bud Green) – 6:26
5. "Hold 'Em Joe" (Traditional) – 7:24
6. "It's All Right with Me" (Cole Porter) – 3:48
7. "Chessman's Delight" (Randy Weston) – 9:26
8. "Theme: Solemn Meditation" (Gill) – 1:24

== Personnel ==
=== Randy Weston Trio with Cecil Payne ===
- Cecil Payne – baritone saxophone (except "You Go to My Head", "It's All Right with Me")
- Randy Weston – piano
- Ahmed Abdul-Malik – bass (except "It's All Right with Me")
- Al Dreares – drums (except "It's All Right with Me")

=== Technical personnel ===
- Bill Grauer, Orrin Keepnews – producer
- Ray Fowler – engineer
- Paul Bacon – design
- Paul Weller – cover photography
- Orrin Keepnews – liner notes
