= Destry Rides Again (Randy Weston album) =

Studio album by Randy Weston
- Released: 1959
- Recorded: May 1959; New York City
- Genre: Jazz
- Label: United Artists; UAL 4045
- Producer: Jack Lewis

Randy Weston chronology
Little Niles (1958)	Destry Rides Again (1959)	Live at the Five Spot (1959)

Destry Rides Again is an album by American jazz pianist Randy Weston recorded in 1959 featuring music from the comedy stage musical Destry Rides Again and originally released on the United Artists label.

== Reception ==
Professional ratings
Review scores
Source	Rating
Allmusic	3/5 stars

Allmusic awarded the album 3 stars.

== Track listing ==
All compositions by Harold Rome

1. "We’re Ladies - 1:53
2. "I Know Your Kind" - 2:29
3. "Rose Lovejoy of Paradise Alley"- 2:29
4. "Anyone Would Love You"- 3:04
5. "Once Knew a Fella" - 2:15
6. "Every Once in a While" - 2:13
7. "Fair Warning" - 2:50
8. "Are You Ready Gyp Watson?" - 1:46
9. "That Ring on the Finger" - 2:08
10. "Once Knew a Fella (Reprise)" - 2:39
11. "I Say Hello" - 2:50

== Personnel ==
- Randy Weston – piano
- Slide Hampton –trombone
- Bennie Green – trombone
- Melba Liston – trombone
- Frank Rehak – trombone
- Peck Morrison – bass
- Elvin Jones – drums
- Willie Rodriguez – percussion
