= Carnival (Randy Weston album) =

1975 live album by Randy Weston

Live album by Randy Weston
- Released: 1975
- Recorded: July 5, 1974
- Venue: Montreux Jazz Festival, Montreux, Switzerland
- Genre: Jazz
- Length: 38:02
- Label: Freedom; FLP 40148
- Producer: Alan Bates, Michael Cuscuna

Randy Weston chronology
Tanjah (1973)	Carnival (1975)	Informal Solo Piano (1974)

Carnival is a live album by American jazz pianist Randy Weston recorded in 1974 at the Montreux Jazz Festival and originally released on the Freedom label in 1975.

== Reception ==
Professional ratings
Review scores
Source	Rating
Allmusic	4/5 stars
Christgau's Record Guide	B+
The Rolling Stone Jazz Record Guide	3/5 stars

AllMusic awarded the album 4 stars, with its review by Scott Yanow stating, "This is an enjoyable and well-rounded set, easily recommended". Village Voice critic Robert Christgau wrote: "A delightful discovery. Weston applies the rigorous wit of Monk to easy rolling African polyrhythms, and they hold up. The title cut suggests a time when intellect is transcended rather than blotted out and makes Lonnie Liston Smith sound pretty sloppy."

== Track listing ==
All compositions by Randy Weston except as indicated

1. "Carnival" - 12:42
2. Introduction - 1:00
3. "Tribute to Duke Ellington" - 7:25
4. Introduction - 1:00
5. "Mystery of Love" (Guy Warren) - 17:55

== Personnel ==
- Randy Weston - piano
- Billy Harper - tenor saxophone, flute
- William Allen - bass
- Don Moye - drums
- Steve Berrios, congas, percussion
