= African Cookbook =

1969 album by Randy Weston's African Rhythms

Studio album by Randy Weston's African Rhythms
- Released: 1969
- Genre: Jazz
- Label: Comet
- Producer: Henri Belolo, Randy Weston

Randy Weston chronology
Monterey '66 (1966)	African Cookbook (1969)	Niles Littlebig (1969)

African Cookbook is an album by Randy Weston's African Rhythms. The set of quintet performances was recorded in Paris, France. It was released by Comet Records in 1969.

The title track was inspired by the playing of tenor saxophonist Booker Ervin, who recorded with Weston between 1963 and 1966. Weston said: "'African Cookbook', which I composed back in the early '60s, was partly named after Booker because we (musicians) used to call him 'Book,' and we would say, 'Cook, Book.' Sometimes when he was playing we'd shout, 'Cook, Book, cook.' And the melody of 'African Cookbook' was based upon Booker Ervin's sound, a sound like the north of Africa. He would kind of take those notes and make them weave hypnotically."

== Track listing ==
All compositions by Randy Weston except as indicated

1. "African Cookbook" - 14:06
2. "A Night in Medina" - 4:43
3. "Jajouka" - 6:06
4. "Marrakech Blues" - 6:14
5. "Con Alma" (Dizzy Gillespie) - 4:49
6. "Afro Black" - 2:59

== Personnel ==
- Randy Weston – piano
- Henri Texier – bass
- Art Taylor – drums
- Azzedin Niles Weston, Reebop Kwaku Baah – percussion
