= Live at the Five Spot (Randy Weston album) =

1959 live album by pianist Randy Weston

Live album by Randy Weston
- Released: 1959
- Recorded: 26 October 1959
- Venue: The Five Spot Café, New York City
- Genre: Jazz
- Length: 38:00
- Label: United Artists; UAL 4066
- Producer: Tom Wilson

Randy Weston chronology
Destry Rides Again (1959)	Live at the Five Spot (1959)	Uhuru Afrika (1960)

Live at the Five Spot is a live album by jazz pianist Randy Weston recorded in 1959 at the Five Spot Café and originally released on the United Artists label.

== Reception ==
Professional ratings
Review scores
Source	Rating
AllMusic	3/5 stars
DownBeat	4.5/5 stars

The contemporaneous DownBeat reviewer, Ira Gitler, praised the location sound quality and concluded that "Records like this are enough to restore your faith in jazz". AllMusic awarded the album 3 stars.

== Track listing ==
All compositions by Randy Weston except as indicated

1. "Hi-Fly" 7:21
2. "Beef Blues Stew" - 5:00
3. "Where" - 5:53
4. "Star Crossed Lovers" (Billy Strayhorn, Duke Ellington) - 5:09
5. "Spot Five Blues" (Weston, Kenny Dorham) - 10:42
6. "Lisa Lovely" - 4:38

== Personnel ==
- Randy Weston - piano
- Kenny Dorham - trumpet (tracks 1–3, 5 & 6)
- Coleman Hawkins - tenor saxophone
- Wilbur Little - bass
- Clifford Jarvis (track 6), Roy Haynes - drums
- Brock Peters - vocal (track 3)
- Melba Liston - arranger
