= Brock Peters =

American actor (1927–2005)

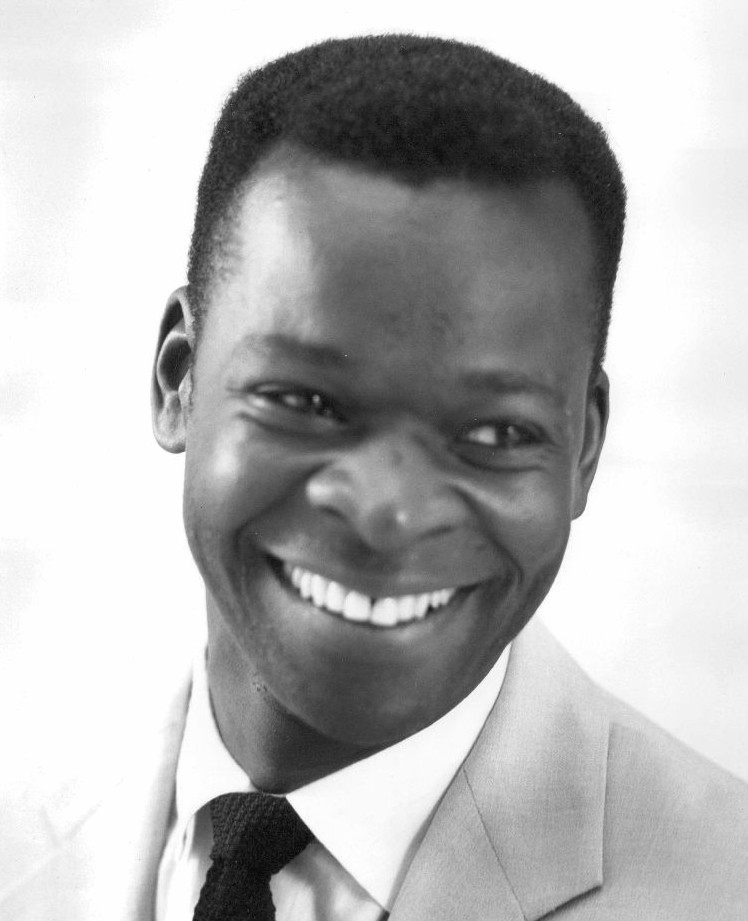
- Peters in 1961
- Born: George Fisher; July 2, 1927; Harlem, Manhattan, New York, U.S.
- Died: August 23, 2005 (aged 78); Los Angeles, California, U.S.
- Other name: Brock G. Peters
- Education: High School of Music & Art; City College of New York
- Occupation: Actor
- Years active: 1949–2005
- Spouse: Dolores Daniels (m. 1961; died 1989)
- Children: 1

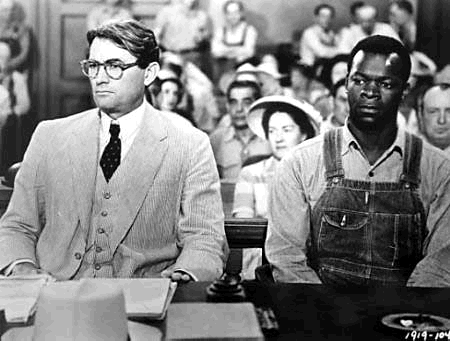
Peters and Gregory Peck in To Kill a Mockingbird (1962)

Brock Peters (born George Fisher; July 2, 1927 – August 23, 2005) was an American actor, best known for playing the villainous "Crown" in the 1959 film version of Porgy and Bess, and Tom Robinson in the 1962 film To Kill a Mockingbird. He made his Broadway debut in the 1965 Norman Rosten play Mister Johnson. He was nominated for a Tony Award and won a Drama Desk Award and an Outer Critics Circle Award for his lead role as Rev. Stephen Kumalo in the 1972 Broadway revival of the musical Lost in the Stars. He received the Screen Actors Guild Life Achievement Award in 1991 and a star on Hollywood Walk of Fame in 1992.

In the 1980s and 1990s, Peters voiced the role of Darth Vader in the serial radio drama adaptations of the original trilogy of Star Wars films, and played two recurring roles in the Star Trek franchise: Starfleet Admiral Cartwright in two of the original-cast feature films, and Joseph Sisko (father of station commander Benjamin Sisko) in Star Trek: Deep Space Nine.

Peters' notable film roles include Carmen Jones (1954), The Pawnbroker (1964), Soylent Green (1973) and Ghosts of Mississippi (1996).

== Early life ==
Peters was born George Fisher in New York City, the son of Alma A. (née Norford) and Sonnie Fisher, a sailor. Peters set his sights on a show business career early on, at the age of 10. Avidly encouraged by his mother Alma to pursue a musical career, he studied the violin from 10 to 14 years of age, but he found out that his singing talents were more prodigious and upon enrolling at New York's famed High School of Music & Art, he immediately signed up for several productions in its musical theatre program. Upon graduation, Peters initially fielded more odd jobs than acting jobs, often working as a hospital orderly at night while he worked his way through physical education studies at the City College of New York (CCNY), but he still stayed connected to the burgeoning theatre and creative community in New York, occasionally doing background parts in musical plays like "Black Aida".

== Career ==
After auditioning and landing a spot touring with the Leonard DePaur Infantry Chorus (of which he was a civilian member from 1945 to 1947), he officially quit CCNY. Peters often joked that he "grew up" in the chorus, because his vocal range changed from baritone to bass baritone during his years with them. DePaur subsequently gave him the lead in the Chorus' popular rendition of "John Henry" (which became a repertoire mainstay of Peters in later years, singing the work on one of his two solo albums which was produced by United Artists Records in the 1960s).

At the suggestion of his agent, he adopted a more memorable stage name, reversing the order of the names of childhood friend Peter Brock.

After auditioning and landing a stage role in the touring company of Porgy and Bess in 1949 on contralto Etta Moten Barnett's suggestion, he went on tour with the opera, where William Warfield commended his performances and requested that Peters be his understudy as Porgy. It was during this time while he was touring in Europe with the opera that Paul Robeson saw him in his career-defining role as "Crown" and purportedly declared that he was "a young Paul Robeson".

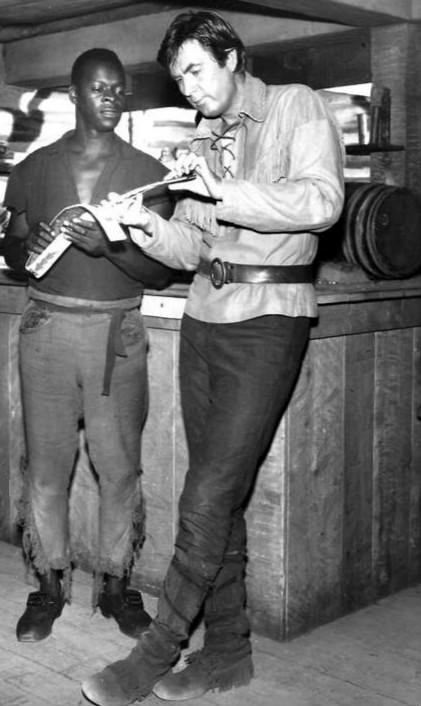
Peters with Fess Parker in the episode "Pompey" on Daniel Boone (1964)

Peters made his film debut in Carmen Jones in 1954, but began to make a name for himself in such films as To Kill a Mockingbird and The L-Shaped Room. He received a Tony nomination for his starring stint in Broadway's Lost in the Stars.

Peters sang background vocals on the 1956 hit "Day-O" by Harry Belafonte, as well as on Belafonte's 1957 hit, "Mama Look at Bubu". He led the chorus at recording sessions for Belafonte's iconic 1956 album Calypso. He also sang on the song "Where" from Randy Weston's 1959 album Live at the Five Spot and shared vocal duties with Martha Flowers on Weston's album of the following year, Uhuru Afrika. During this time, Peters and Belafonte became close friends, sharing similar political views and approaches to their careers. In 1963, he played Matthew Robinson in Heavens Above!, a British satirical-comedy film starring Peter Sellers, directed by John and Roy Boulting. He played a supporting role as the gangster Rodriguez in the 1964 film, The Pawnbroker, one of the first confirmed homosexual characters in an American film. He played “Jesse” in a 1972 episode of Gunsmoke. He was a special guest star in the third season of The Streets of San Francisco, playing the character "Jacob" in the episode called "Jacob's Boy" (1974).

In the film Abe Lincoln, Freedom Fighter (1978), Peters plays Henry, a freed black slave who is falsely accused of robbery but, defended by Abraham Lincoln, is found not guilty due to the fact he has a damaged hand and could not have committed the crime. In To Kill a Mockingbird, Peters plays Tom Robinson, a black man falsely accused of raping a white girl, a crime Atticus Finch shows he could not have committed because his left hand and arm were damaged. In 1970 Peters portrayed the voice of African-American boxer Jack Johnson in Bill Cayton's film of the same name, and it is in this role that he can be heard at the end of Miles Davis' soundtrack album, Jack Johnson, saying: "I'm Jack Johnson. Heavyweight champion of the world. I'm black. They never let me forget it. I'm black, all right. I'll never let them forget it."

Between 1981 and 1996, Peters voiced Darth Vader in the radio adaptations of the first three Star Wars films for National Public Radio. He also played the role of a Colonial prosecutor trying to make a murder case against Starbuck in an episode of the original Battlestar Galactica.

Peters appeared in the films Star Trek IV: The Voyage Home and Star Trek VI: The Undiscovered Country as Fleet Admiral Cartwright of Starfleet Command. Peters portrayed Joseph Sisko, father of Deep Space Nine's commanding officer, Benjamin Sisko, on Star Trek: Deep Space Nine. In 1993, he was a member of the jury at the 43rd Berlin International Film Festival. In early 2005, six months before his death, Peters guest-starred in an episode of JAG during its final season, "Bridging the Gulf", season 10 episode 15. Peters worked with Charlton Heston on several theater productions in the 1940s and 1950s. The two became friends and subsequently worked together on several films, including Major Dundee, Soylent Green, and Two-Minute Warning. He voiced Lucius Fox in several episodes of Batman: The Animated Series and had a guest role as Morris Grant/Soul Power in the Static Shock episode "Blast from the Past" (2003).

He was involved in many community projects, including being chairman and a co-founder of the Dance Theatre of Harlem.

== Recognition ==
Brock was awarded the 26th Screen Actors Guild Life Achievement Award in 1990 for his acting career and humanitarian contributions. He was given a star on the Hollywood Walk of Fame in the live theater category in 1992.

== Personal life and death ==
Peters was once romantically involved with actress Ja'net Dubois. He was married to Dolores 'DiDi' Daniels from 1961 until her death in 1989. Their daughter, Lisa Jo Peters, was born November 3, 1962. Peters delivered the eulogy at Gregory Peck's funeral in 2003. His character, Tom Robinson, was defended by Peck's Atticus Finch in 1962's To Kill a Mockingbird.

Peters died in Los Angeles from pancreatic cancer on August 23, 2005, at the age of 78. He is buried in the Revelation section at Hollywood Hills Forest Lawn Cemetery, in Los Angeles, California.

== Filmography ==
=== Film ===
Year	Title	Role	Notes
1954	Carmen Jones	Sergeant Brown	
1959	Porgy and Bess	Crown	
1962	The L-Shaped Room	Johnny	
1962	To Kill a Mockingbird	Tom Robinson	
1963	Heavens Above!	Matthew Robinson	
1964	The Pawnbroker	Rodriguez	
1965	Major Dundee	Aesop	
1967	The Incident	Arnold Robinson	
1968	P.J.	Waterpark	
1968	Daring Game	Jonah	
1968	Ace High	Thomas	
1970	The McMasters	Benjamin "Benjie"	
1972	Black Girl	Earl	
1973	Soylent Green	Lieutenant Hatcher	
1974	Slaughter's Big Rip-Off	Reynolds	
1974	Lost in the Stars	Reverend Stephen Kumalo	
1975	Framed	Sam Perry	
1976	Two-Minute Warning	Paul	
1978	Abe Lincoln: Freedom Fighter	Henry	
1986	Star Trek IV: The Voyage Home	Fleet Admiral Cartwright	
1991	Alligator II: The Mutation	Chief Clarence Speed	
1991	Star Trek VI: The Undiscovered Country	Fleet Admiral Cartwright	
1992	The Importance of Being Earnest	Dr. Chasuble	
1996	Ghosts of Mississippi	Walter Williams	
1998	Park Day	Heseeit Turner	
2002	No Prom for Cindy	Doctor	Short film
2002	The Wild Thornberrys Movie	Dr. Jomo Mbeli (voice)	

=== Television ===
Year	Title	Role	Notes
1964	Daniel Boone	Pompey	Episode: "Pompey"
1965	The Loner	Lemuel Stove	Episode: "The Homecoming of Lemuel Stove"
1965	Rawhide	Phinn Harper	Episode: "The Spanish Camp"
1967	Mission: Impossible	Walter Dubruis	Episode: "The Money Machine"
1969–1973	Gunsmoke	Cato / Jesse Dillard	2 episodes
1970	Mannix	Sonny Carter	Episode: "Time Out of Mind"
1972	Welcome Home, Johnny Bristol	Berdahl	Television film
1977	SST: Death Flight	Dr. Therman	Television film
1977	Seventh Avenue	Sergeant Rollins	2 episodes
1978	Quincy, M.E.	Frank Matthews	Episode: "Death by Good Intentions"
1978	The Bionic Woman	Jack Stratton	Episode: "Which One is Jaime?"
1978	The Million Dollar Dixie Deliverance	Zechariah	Television film
1979	The Incredible Journey of Doctor Meg Laurel	Joe	Television film
1979	Battlestar Galactica	Solon	Episode: "Murder on the Rising Star"
1981	The Adventures of Huckleberry Finn	Jim	
1982–1985	The Young and the Restless	Frank Lewis	8 episodes
1983	A Caribbean Mystery	Dr. Graham	Television film
1984–1985	Challenge of the GoBots	General Newcastle (voice)	8 episodes
1985	The Greatest Adventure: Stories from the Bible	Priest (voice)	Episode: "Samson and Delilah"
1985	Faerie Tale Theatre	Ogre (voice)	Episode: "Puss in Boots"
1985–1986	Galtar and the Golden Lance	Tormack (voice)	21 episodes
1986	Murder, She Wrote	Mr. Bently	Episode: "Trial by Error"
1987	DuckTales	Druid (voice)	Episode: "The Curse of Castle McDuck"
1988	Broken Angel	Sergeant Mercurio	Television film
1988	To Heal a Nation	Paul Turner	Television film
1989	Polly	Mr. Pendergast	Television film
1990	Gravedale High	Boneyard (voice)	6 episodes
1990	The Great Los Angeles Earthquake	David Motubu	Television film
1991	Captain Planet and the Planeteers	Chief Mola (voice)	Episode: "Plunder Dam"
1991–1993	The Pirates of Dark Water	Bloth (voice)	20 episodes
1992	Highway Heartbreaker	Bert Quinn	Television film
1992	The Secret	Thurgood Carver	Television film
1992	You Must Remember This	Gus	Television film
1992–1994	Batman: The Animated Series	Lucius Fox (voice)	8 episodes
1993–1994	SWAT Kats: The Radical Squadron	Dark Kat (voice)	5 episodes
1994	Cosmic Slop	Minister Coombs	Television film; segment: "Space Traders"
1995–1998	Star Trek: Deep Space Nine	Joseph Sisko	6 episodes
1996	Aaahh!!! Real Monsters	Snorch's Voicebox / Pool (voice)	2 episodes
1996	The New Adventures of Captain Planet	Mammoth (voice)	Episode: "Twelve Angry Animals"
1996	Mortal Kombat: Defenders of the Realm	Ilkan (voice)	Episode: "Swords of Ilkan"
1996–1997	The Real Adventures of Jonny Quest	Masai / Shaman (voice)	2 episodes
1997	Johnny Bravo	Chronos (voice)	Episode: "Bearly Enough Time!"
1997	Spicy City	Bird (voice)	Episode: "Raven's Revenge"
1997	Adventures from the Book of Virtues	Ahasuerus (voice)	Episode: "Loyalty"
1998–2000	The Wild Thornberrys	Dr. Jomo Mbeli / Poacher (voice)	2 episodes
2001	Samurai Jack	Lazzor (voice)	Episode: "Jack, the Woolies, and the Chritchellites"
2001	The Legend of Tarzan	Usula (voice)	2 episodes
2002	10,000 Black Men Named George	Leon Frey	Television film
2002	The Locket	Henry McCord	Television film
2003	Static Shock	Morris Grant / Soul Power (voice)	Episode: "Blast from the Past"
2005	JAG	Paul Revere	Episode: "Bridging the Gulf"; Final role

== Other notable performances ==
- Nat Turner in The Original Confessions of Nat Turner As Made to T.R. Gray, November 1, 1831, LP, CMS Records (1968)
- Stephen Kumalo in Kurt Weill and Maxwell Anderson's Lost in the Stars (stage revival and 1974 film version) – nominated for a Tony Award
- The Reverend Canon Frederick Chasuble, DD in an all-black film version of Oscar Wilde's The Importance of Being Earnest (1992)
- Darth Vader in the Star Wars radio series
- Voice-acting performance as the boxer Jack Johnson on the Miles Davis album A Tribute to Jack Johnson
