= MetroJazz Records =

1950s American jazz record label

MetroJazz was an American jazz record label founded in 1958 as a division of MGM Records. These records were produced by Leonard Feather and included Pepper Adams, Red Callender, Teddy Edwards, Thad Jones, Jimmy Knepper, Sonny Rollins, Randy Weston.

== Discography ==
#	Artist	Album
1001	Toshiko Akiyoshi	United Notions
1002	Sonny Rollins	Sonny Rollins and the Big Brass
1003	The Jones Brothers: Thad Jones, Hank Jones, Elvin Jones	Keepin' Up with the Joneses
1004	Pepper Adams and Jimmy Knepper	The Pepper-Knepper Quintet
1005	Randy Weston/Lem Winchester	New Faces at Newport
1006	Gigi Gryce	Gigi Gryce
1007	Red Callender	The Lowest
1008	Sam Taylor	Jazz for Commuters
1009	Various Artists	The Seven Ages of Jazz
1010	Helen Merrill	You've Got a Date with the Blues
1011	Sonny Rollins/Teddy Edwards	Sonny Rollins at Music Inn/Teddy Edwards at Falcon's Lair
1012	The Mitchells: Red Mitchell, Whitey Mitchell, Blue Mitchell with André Previn	Get Those Elephants Out'a Here
1013	Melba Liston	Melba Liston and Her 'Bones
1014	Pete Jolly & Ralph Pena	Impossible
1015	The Santos Brothers	Jazz for Two Trumpets
