= Highlife (Randy Weston album) =

1963 studio album by pianist Randy Weston

Studio album by Randy Weston
- Released: Early August 1963
- Recorded: April 1963; Webster Hall, New York City
- Genre: Jazz
- Length: 36:55
- Label: Colpix; CP 456
- Producer: Jack Lewis

Randy Weston chronology
Uhuru Afrika (1960)	Highlife (1963)	Randy (1964)

Highlife (full title Music from the New African Nations featuring the Highlife) is an album by American jazz pianist Randy Weston recorded in 1963 and originally released on the Colpix label. Weston had traveled to Africa for the first time in 1961 for a series of concerts in Lagos, Nigeria, sponsored by the American Society of African Culture, and this album is inspired by the music of the African continent, in particular the highlife genre of West Africa.

== Reception ==
Professional ratings
Review scores
Source	Rating
Allmusic	5/5 stars

AllMusic awarded the album 5 stars, with its reviewer Scott Yanow stating: "Highly recommended, these sessions are among the recorded highpoints of Randy Weston's productive career."

== Track listing ==
All compositions by Randy Weston except as indicated

1. "Caban Bamboo Highlife" - 2:46
2. "Niger Mambo" (Bobby Benson) - 5:03
3. "Zulu" - 4:42
4. "In Memory Of" - 7:46
5. "Congolese Children" - 2:34
6. "Blues to Africa" - 6:23
7. "Mystery of Love" (Guy Warren) - 7:41

== Personnel ==
- Randy Weston - piano
- Ray Copeland - trumpet, flugelhorn
- Jimmy Cleveland, Quentin Jackson - trombone
- Julius Watkins - French horn
- Aaron Bell - tuba
- Budd Johnson - soprano saxophone, tenor saxophone
- Booker Ervin - tenor saxophone
- Peck Morrison - bass
- Charlie Persip - drums
- Frankie Dunlop - drums, percussion
- Archie Lee - congas, percussion
- George Young - percussion
- Melba Liston - arranger
