= Monterey '66 =

Live album by Randy Weston

Live album by Randy Weston
- Released: 1994
- Recorded: September 18, 1966
- Venue: Monterey Jazz Festival, Monterey, California
- Genre: Jazz
- Length: 73:33
- Label: Verve; 519 698-2
- Producer: Randy Weston

Randy Weston chronology
Blues (1964-65)	Monterey '66 (1994)	African Cookbook (1969)

Monterey '66 is a live album by American jazz pianist Randy Weston recorded in 1966 at the Monterey Jazz Festival but not released on the Verve label until 1994.

== Reception ==
Professional ratings
Review scores
Source	Rating
Allmusic	4.5/5 stars

Allmusic awarded the album 4½ stars, with its review by Al Campbell stating: "All compositions are Weston originals and feature a strong African thematic influence. The 25-minute heated finale is the percussion laden 'African Cookbook,' in which everyone contributes strong and inspired soloing". The JazzTimes review by Bill Shoemaker said: "In a program containing some of Weston's most well-loved compositions Monterey '66 reveals the working of one of the great unherealded bands of the '60s and the sublime chemistry that existed between Weston and Booker Ervin".

== Track listing ==
All compositions by Randy Weston

1. Introduction by Jimmy Lyons - 0:49
2. "The Call" - 2:18
3. "Afro Black" - 14:24
4. "Little Niles" - 6:50
5. "Portrait of Vivian" - 10:26
6. "Berkshire Blues" - 6:52
7. "Blues for Strayhorn" - 7:17
8. "African Cookbook" - 25:27

== Personnel ==
- Randy Weston - piano
- Ray Copeland - trumpet, flugelhorn, arranger
- Booker Ervin - tenor saxophone - feature track 5
- Cecil Payne - baritone saxophone
- Bill Wood - bass
- Lennie McBrowne - drums
- Big Black - percussion
