= Big Black (musician) =

American jazz musician

Danny "Big Black" Rey
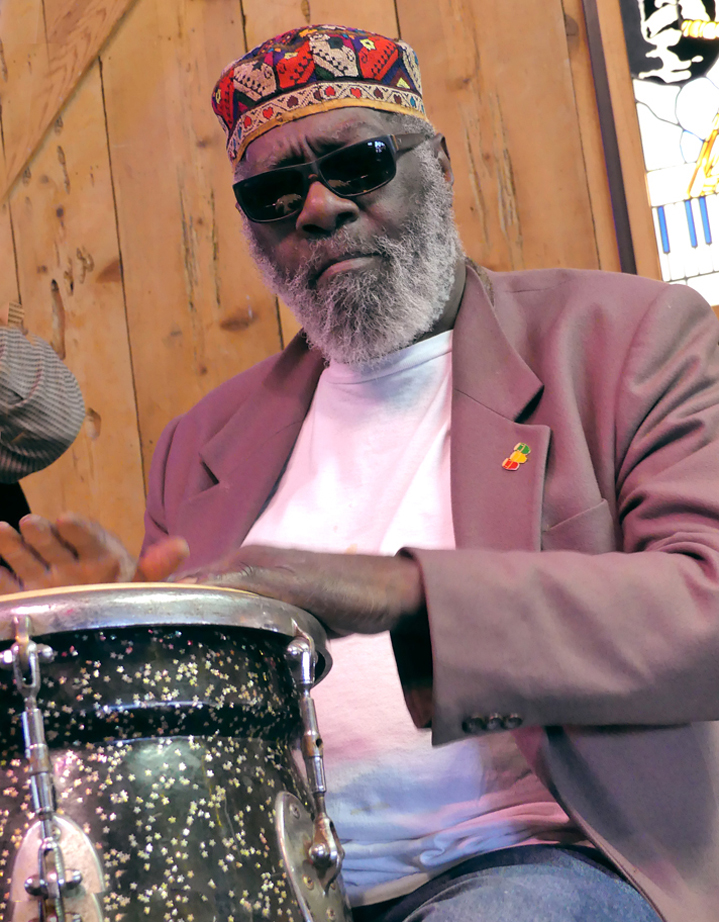
- Danny Rey in 2018
- Born: Daniel Rey; 1934 (age 91–92); Savannah, Georgia, U.S.
- Occupations: Musician, percussionist, actor
- Years active: 1963-present
- Website: Official website

Danny "Big Black" Rey (1934) is an American actor, musician, and percussionist specializing in Latin and ethnic jazz music.

== Career ==
After playing at clubs and hotels in Miami and in calypso bands in the Bahamas during the 1950s, he moved to New York in the early 1960s, working mostly with Randy Weston, as well as performing with Junior Cook.

In 1965 he played with Dizzy Gillespie and Ray Bryant and performed and recorded with Freddie Hubbard. The following year he was back with Weston's band at the Monterey Jazz Festival.

In 1975, he recorded with Charles Tolliver and Pharoah Sanders.

In 1989 he moved from New York to California.

== Discography ==
As leader/co-leader

- Message to our Ancestors (1969), with the flutist Black Harold (Universal City 73012)
- Ethnic Fusion (1981–1982), with the guitarist Arthur Wheaton (1750 Arch 1790)

As sideman

- Randy (1964) – Randy Weston (Bakton)
- The Night of the Cookers (1965) – Freddie Hubbard (Blue Note Records)
- Monterey '66 (released 1994) – Randy Weston (Verve Records)
- Blue Spirits (released 1967) – Freddie Hubbard (Blue Note Records)
- Impact (1975) – Charles Tolliver's Music Inc. and Orchestra (Strata-East Records)
