= Berkshire Blues =

1977 studio album by pianist Randy Weston

Studio album by Randy Weston
- Released: 1977
- Recorded: August 18 and October 14, 1965, New York City
- Genre: Jazz
- Length: 37:28
- Label: Freedom; FLP 41026
- Producer: Alan Bates, Duke Ellington, Ruth Ellington, Michael Cuscuna

Randy Weston chronology
Randy (1964)	Berkshire Blues (1977)	Blues (1965)

Berkshire Blues is an album by American jazz pianist Randy Weston, recorded in 1965 and released on the Freedom label in 1977.

The title track, in the waltz tempo characteristic of many Weston compositions, was written in 1962 and recorded in 1964 by the Randy Weston Sextet (on the album Randy), with Betty Carter later putting lyrics to the tune and performing it under the tile "Ego").

== Reception ==
Professional ratings
Review scores
Source	Rating
AllMusic	3/5 stars
The Rolling Stone Jazz Record Guide	3/5 stars

AllMusic awarded the album 3 stars, with its review by Scott Yanow stating: "Throughout the set, Weston's solos hold on to one's interest, although the overall results are really not all that essential."

== Track listing ==
All compositions by Randy Weston except as indicated

1. "Three Blind Mice" (Traditional) - 5:33
2. "Perdido" (Juan Tizol) - 6:24
3. "Purple Gazelle" (Duke Ellington) - 5:53
4. "Berkshire Blues" - 4:14
5. "Lagos" - 5:36
6. "Sweet Meat" - 3:39
7. "Ifran" - 5:37
- Recorded on 18 August 1965 (tracks 4–7) and 14 October, 1965 (tracks 1–3) in New York City

== Personnel ==
- Randy Weston - piano
- Vishnu Bill Wood - bass (tracks 1–3)
- Lennie McBrowne - drums (tracks 1–3)
