= Tanjah (album) =

1974 studio album by Randy Weston

Studio album by Randy Weston
- Released: May 1974
- Recorded: May 21 & 22, 1973; New York City
- Genre: Jazz
- Length: 43:53
- Label: Polydor; PD 5055

Randy Weston chronology
Blue Moses (1972)	Tanjah (1974)	Carnival (1974)

Tanjah is a studio album by American jazz pianist Randy Weston recorded in May 1973 in New York City and originally released on the Polydor label.

== Reception ==
Professional ratings
Review scores
Source	Rating
Allmusic	4.5/5 stars

AllMusic awarded the album 4½ stars, with its review by Scott Yanow stating: "The weak points are Weston's use of the Fender Rhodes on a few songs (it waters down his personality) and Candido's chanting during an otherwise exciting version of 'Hi-Fly,' but those are easily compensated for by the infectious calypso 'Jamaican East' and Liston's inventive reworking of 'Little Niles.' Recommended."

== Track listing ==
All compositions by Randy Weston

1. "Hi-Fly" – 5:06
2. "In Memory Of" – 5:55
3. "Sweet Meat" – 3:42
4. "Jamaica East" – 4:36
5. "Sweet Meat [First Alternative Take]" – 3:54 Bonus track on CD reissue
6. "Tanjah" – 8:36
7. "The Last Day" – 4:07
8. "Sweet Meat [Second Alternative Take]" – 3:46 Bonus track on CD reissue
9. "Little Niles" – 4:11

== Personnel ==
- Randy Weston – piano
- Ernie Royal, Ray Copeland, Jon Faddis – trumpet, flugelhorn
- Al Grey – trombone
- Jack Jeffers – bass trombone
- Julius Watkins – French horn
- Norris Turney – alto saxophone, piccolo
- Taiwo Yusve Divall – alto saxophone, ashiko drums
- Budd Johnson – tenor saxophone, soprano saxophone, clarinet
- Billy Harper – tenor saxophone, flute
- Danny Bank – baritone saxophone, bass clarinet, flute
- Ron Carter – bass
- Rudy Collins – drums
- Azzedin Weston – percussion
- Candido Camero – percussion, narrator
- Omar Clay – marimba, timbales
- Earl Williams – percussion
- Ahmed Abdul-Malik – oud, narrator
- Delores Ivory Davis – vocals on "The Last Day"
- Melba Liston – arranger
