= Cole Porter in a Modern Mood =

Studio album by Randy Weston
- Released: 1955
- Recorded: 27 April 1954; New York City
- Genre: Jazz
- Length: 29:20
- Label: Riverside; RLP 2508
- Producer: Orrin Keepnews

Randy Weston chronology
Cole Porter in a Modern Mood (1955)	The Randy Weston Trio (1955)

Cole Porter in a Modern Mood is the debut album by American jazz pianist Randy Weston, recorded in 1954 and released on the Riverside label as a 10-inch LP.

== Reception ==
Professional ratings
Review scores
Source	Rating
AllMusic	3/5 stars

Billboard in 1954 wrote: "Weston turns in a brilliant display of modern jazz stylings on a selection of Cole Porter favorites. This is the first time that Weston, who has played with groups in New York since the war, has had a chance to really display his technique and his musicianship on disks and he makes the most of it."

AllMusic awarded the album 3 stars with the review by Alex Henderson stating: "back in 1954 -- when a 28-year-old Randy Weston recorded Randy Weston Plays Cole Porter in a Modern Mood -- saluting Porter wasn't an idea that beboppers had run into the ground and beaten to death. It was still an intriguing idea, and the element of intrigue is definitely present on this record... the pianist's career as a leader was off to an impressive start".

== Track listing ==
All compositions by Cole Porter

1. "Get Out of Town" - 4:29
2. "I Get a Kick Out of You" - 3:10
3. "I Love You" - 2:58
4. "In the Still of the Night" - 4:40
5. "Just One of Those Things" - 4:29
6. "Night and Day" - 3:36
7. "What Is This Thing Called Love?" - 2:50
8. "I've Got You Under My Skin" - 3:08

== Personnel ==
- Randy Weston - piano
- Sam Gill - bass
