= Blue Moses (album) =

1972 studio album by Randy Weston

Studio album by Randy Weston
- Released: June 1972
- Recorded: March–April 1972
- Studio: Van Gelder Studio, Englewood Cliffs, New Jersey
- Genre: Jazz
- Length: 36:52
- Label: CTI; CTI 6011
- Producer: Creed Taylor

Randy Weston chronology
African Rhythms (1969)	Blue Moses (1972)	Tanjah (1973)

Blue Moses is a studio album by American jazz pianist and composer Randy Weston featuring performances recorded in 1972 and released on the CTI label.

== Reception ==
Professional ratings
Review scores
Source	Rating
AllMusic	4/5 stars
The Rolling Stone Jazz Record Guide	4/5 stars

AllMusic states: "Recorded in 1972, Blue Moses, the most commercially successful album in pianist/composer Randy Weston's catalog remains one of his most controversial due to his conflicted feelings about the final product, which he feels is too polished and too far from his original intent for the project. Indeed, appearing on Creed Taylor's CTI imprint was an almost certain guarantee of polished production.... No matter how Weston ultimately feels about Blue Moses, this date succeeds on all levels. Creating a commercially viable recording from the elements presented must not have been easy, but Taylor rose to the occasion and delivered a grooving beauty of an album without compromising Weston's genius".

== Track listing ==
All compositions by Randy Weston.

1. "Ifrane" – 5:16
2. "Ganawa (Blue Moses)" – 12:29
3. "Night in Medina" – 6:50
4. "Marrakesh Blues" – 12:17
- Recorded at Van Gelder Studio in Englewood Cliffs, New Jersey, in March and April 1972.

== Personnel ==
- Randy Weston – electric piano
- Freddie Hubbard – trumpet
- John Frosk, Alan Rubin, Marvin Stamm – trumpet, flugelhorn
- Garnett Brown, Warren Covington – trombone
- Wayne Andre – trombone, baritone horn
- Paul Faulise – bass trombone
- James Buffington, Brooks Tillotson – French horn
- Grover Washington, Jr. – tenor saxophone
- Hubert Laws – flute, alto flute, bass flute, piccolo
- Romeo Penque – clarinet, flute, alto flute, bass flute, piccolo, oboe, English horn
- George Marge – clarinet, flute, alto flute, bass flute, English horn
- David Horowitz – synthesizer
- Ron Carter, Vishnu Bill Wood – bass
- Billy Cobham – drums
- Phil Kraus, Airto Moreira, Azzedin Weston – percussion
- Madame Meddah – vocals
- Don Sebesky – arranger, conductor
- Rudy Van Gelder – engineer
- Bob Ciano – design
