= Gotham City (website) =

- Website type: News website
- Founded: 2017
- Country of origin: Switzerland
- Founders: Marie Maurisse and François Pilet
- Editors: Marie Maurisse; François Pilet; Coline Emmel; Federico Franchini; Karine Pfenniger
- Website: gothamcity.ch

Gotham City is a French-speaking Swiss investigative news website sourcing information through a judicial watch and specializing in white-collar crime (fraud, corruption, money laundering).

Gotham City focuses on white-collar crime cases related to the Swiss financial industry. The court reporters obtain information through open data requests from courts in Switzerland, France and abroad. The articles give as often as possible access to original court documents obtained from official sources. It is an independent, reader-funded, advertising-free, subscription-only media outlet.

== History ==
Gotham City was founded in 2017 by investigative journalists Marie Maurisse and François Pilet. The editorial staff also includes Coline Emmel and Federico Franchini.

In June 2019, Gotham City revealed that SICPA, a Swiss company that provides security inks for currencies and sensitive documents, is subject to criminal proceedings by the Office of the Attorney General of Switzerland for acts of corruption in Brazil. In August 2019, it published a second article stating that the federal investigation against SICPA involves suspicions of corruption in fourteen countries. In June 2021, it revealed that the federal investigation against Sicpa was extended to Philippe Amon, Sicpa's owner.

Gotham City revealed in August 2020 that the public prosecutor's office of the Canton Geneva had frozen $900 million belonging to Carlos Manuel de São Vicente, the husband of Irene Alexandra da Silva Neto, daughter of Angola's first president, António Agostinho Neto. The ruling indicates that the public prosecutor's office of the Canton Geneva opened criminal proceedings for money laundering against Carlos Manuel de São Vicente in December 2018. Carlos Vicente is suspected of embezzling funds from his Angolan insurance company AAA Seguros SA. The latter was responsible for covering risks related to the oil activities of the Angolan national company Sonangol. These revelations sparked outcry in Angola.

In June 2021, Gotham City revealed that the US embassy in Bern requested the extradition of Vladislav Klyushin, who was arrested in canton Valais and was being held in the town of Sion in southern Switzerland.

In 2022, the outlet published a judgement from the Administrative Chamber of the Geneva Court that ordered billionaire Pierre Castel to pay 415 million francs in back taxes.
