= Gotham City (album) =

Studio album by Dexter Gordon
- Released: 1981
- Recorded: August 11–12, 1980
- Studio: CBS Studios, New York City
- Genre: Jazz
- Length: 34:20
- Label: Columbia; JC 36853
- Producer: Jim Fischel, Michael Cuscuna

Dexter Gordon chronology
Nights at the Keystone, Volumes 1-4 (1979)	Gotham City (1981)	American Classic (1982)

Gotham City is a jazz album by saxophonist Dexter Gordon recorded in 1980 and released by Columbia in 1981.

== Reception ==
Professional ratings
Review scores
Source	Rating
AllMusic	3/5 stars

AllMusic reviewer Scott Yanow awarded the album 3 stars and wrote that "Dexter Gordon was still in pretty good form at the time of this later recording" and "the quality of the solos is quite high".

== Track listing ==
1. "Hi-Fly" (Randy Weston) – 9:33
2. "A Nightingale Sang in Berkeley Square" (Eric Maschwitz, Manning Sherwin) – 7:12
3. "The Blues Walk (Loose Walk)" (Clifford Brown) – 8:17
4. "Gotham City" (Dexter Gordon) – 9:18

== Personnel ==
- Dexter Gordon – tenor saxophone
- George Benson – electric guitar (tracks 1 & 4)
- Woody Shaw – trumpet (track 3)
- Cedar Walton – piano
- Percy Heath – bass
- Art Blakey – drums

Technical

- Don Puluse - engineer
- Maxine Gregg - executive producer
- Richard Avedon - photography
