= Little Niles (song) =

Composition by Randy Weston

"Little Niles" is a composition by jazz pianist Randy Weston written in waltz time that has become a jazz standard. It was first recorded in 1956 for his album With These Hands..., and was subsequently included in his 1958 album, also called Little Niles, which was inspired by his two then young children, Niles (later known as Azzedine) and Pamela. Other Weston albums that feature the composition include Tanjah (1973), Niles Littlebig (1969), and Monterey '66. Lyrics to the song were composed by Jon Hendricks, recorded on the Lambert, Hendricks & Ross album The Swingers! (1958).

Other artists who have recorded versions include:

- Herbie Mann (Salute to the Flute, October 1957)
- Oscar Pettiford (The Oscar Pettiford Orchestra in Hi-Fi Volume Two, 1957)
- Abbey Lincoln (It's Magic, 1958)
- George Shearing (Shearing on Stage!, 1959)
- Eugen Cicero (In Town, 1965)
- Phineas Newborn (Please Send Me Someone to Love, 1969)
- Dollar Brand (This Is Dollar Brand, 1973)
- Kenny Barron (Spiral, 1982)
- James Spaulding (Gotstabe a Better Way!, 1988)
- Ellis Marsalis Jr. (Ellis Marsalis Trio, 1990)
- Erik Friedlander (Chimera, 1995)
- Harold Danko (3/4 - Three of Four, 1998)
- Jan Lundgren (Cooking! At the Jazz Bakery, 1998)
- Stefon Harris, Jacky Terrasson (Kindred, 2001)
- John Heard (The Jazz Composer's Songbook, 2005)
