= Dawn Records (American label) =

American record label (1954–c. 1958)

Dawn Records was an American record label. It was founded in 1954 as a subsidiary of Seeco Records and was run by Sidney Siegel.

Dawn began to release albums in the mid-1950s, issuing primarily jazz recordings, pop, R&B, and folk revival material. While it was active only for a few years, it released some significant jazz releases. Its holdings were bought later by Biograph Records and then by Fresh Sound Records, both of which reissued much of its catalog on CD.

== Artists ==
- Al Cohn
- Paul Quinichette
- Mat Mathews
- Dick Garcia
- Frank Rehak
- Joe Puma
- Zoot Sims
- Randy Weston
- Charlie Rouse
- Julius Watkins
- Lucky Thompson
- Jimmy Raney
- Gene Quill
- Bob Brookmeyer
- Gérard Pochonet
- Rita Reys
- The Treniers
- Aaron Sachs
- Hal Serra
