= Melba Liston =

American jazz trombonist, arranger, and composer (1926–1999)

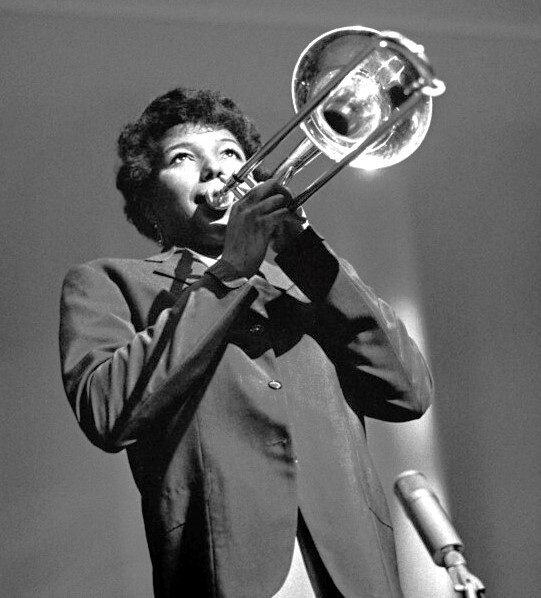
- Liston in 1960

Background information
- Born: Melba Doretta Liston; January 13, 1926; Kansas City, Missouri, U.S.
- Died: April 23, 1999 (aged 73) Los Angeles, California, U.S.
- Genre: Jazz
- Occupations: Musician; arranger; composer; music educator
- Instrument: Trombone
- Years active: 1940s–1970s
- Labels: MetroJazz; Antilles

Melba Doretta Liston (January 13, 1926 – April 23, 1999) was an American jazz trombonist, arranger, and composer. She was the first woman trombonist to play alongside men in big bands during the 1940s and 1960s, but as her career progressed, she became better known as an arranger, particularly in partnership with pianist Randy Weston. Other major musicians with whom she worked include Dizzy Gillespie, Billie Holiday, John Coltrane, and Count Basie.

== Early life and education ==
Liston was born in Kansas City, Missouri. At the age of seven, her mother purchased her a trombone and she began learning to play. Her family encouraged her musical pursuits, as they were all music lovers.

Liston was primarily self-taught, but she was "encouraged by her guitar-playing grandfather", with whom she spent significant time learning to play spirituals and folk songs.

At the age of eight, she was good enough to be a solo act on a local radio station. At age ten, she moved to Los Angeles, California. She was classmates with Dexter Gordon and friends with Eric Dolphy. After playing in youth bands and studying with Alma Hightower for three years, she decided to become a professional musician and joined the big band led by Gerald Wilson in 1943.

== Career ==
Liston joined the Musicians Union (Local 474, the Colored Musicians Union) at the age of 16 in order to accept her first professional job with the Lincoln Theater pit band. She and Dexter Gordon began playing music together at the ages of 14 and 17, respectively, and she recorded with Gordon in 1947. When Wilson disbanded his orchestra in 1948, Liston joined Dizzy Gillespie's big band in New York, which included saxophonists John Coltrane, Paul Gonsalves, and pianist John Lewis, after being sought out personally by the bandleader for her talents as both a trombonist and as an arranger.

Liston performed in a supporting role and was nervous when asked to take solos, but with encouragement, she became more comfortable as a featured voice in bands, though it was her innovative jazz arrangements that legitimized her presence in a very male-dominated environment. She toured with Count Basie, then with Billie Holiday (1949), but was so profoundly affected by the indifference of the audiences and the rigors of the road that she gave up playing and turned to education. Liston taught for about three years.

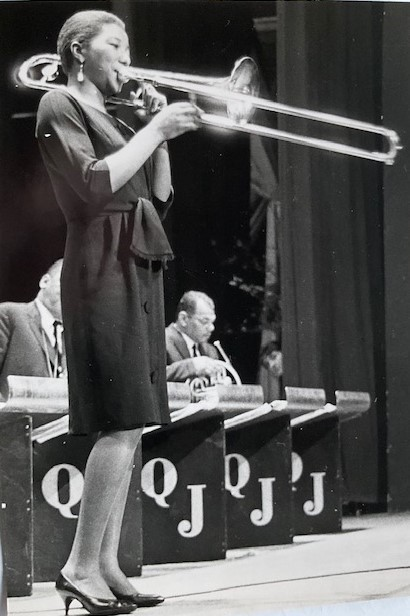
Liston with the Quincy Jones Big Band in 1961, at the Kursaal in Baden, Switzerland

She took a clerical job for some years and supplemented her income by taking work as an extra in Hollywood, appearing with Lana Turner in The Prodigal (1955) and in The Ten Commandments (1956). Liston returned to Gillespie for tours sponsored by the U.S. State Department in 1956 and 1957, recorded with Art Blakey's Jazz Messengers (1957), and formed an all-women quintet in 1958. In 1959, she visited Europe with the show Free and Easy, for which Quincy Jones was the music director. She accompanied Billy Eckstine with the Quincy Jones Orchestra on At Basin Street East, released in 1961, by Verve Records.

In the late 1950s, she began collaborating with pianist Randy Weston, arranging compositions (primarily his own) for mid-size to large ensembles. This association, especially strong in the 1960s, would be rekindled in the late 1980s and 1990s until her death. In addition, she worked with Milt Jackson, Clark Terry, and Johnny Griffin, as well as working as an arranger for Motown, appearing on albums by Ray Charles. In 1964, she helped establish the Pittsburgh Jazz Orchestra.

In 1971, she was chosen as musical arranger for Stax Records musician Calvin Scott, whose album was being produced by Stevie Wonder's first producer, Clarence Paul. On this album she worked with Joe Sample and Wilton Felder of the Jazz Crusaders, blues guitarist Arthur Adams, and jazz drummer Paul Humphrey. She worked with youth orchestras in Watts, Los Angeles, before accepting an invitation from the Government of Jamaica in 1973 to become the Director of Afro-American Pop and Jazz at the Jamaica School of Music. She returned to the U.S. in 1979 where she was honored at the first Women's Jazz Festival in Kansas City, Missouri, and the Salute to Women in Jazz in New York, later forming a new band: Melba Liston and Company.

During her time in Jamaica, she composed and arranged music for the 1975 comedy film Smile Orange, starring Carl Bradshaw, who three years earlier starred in the first Jamaican film, The Harder They Come (1972). She also served as composer, arranger, and musical director of The Dread Mikado, a theater production considered emblematic of the Jamaican cultural revolution.

She was forced to give up playing in 1985 after a stroke left her partially paralyzed, but she continued to arrange music with Randy Weston. In 1987, she was awarded a Jazz Masters Fellowship from the National Endowment for the Arts.

== Death ==
After suffering repeated strokes, Liston died aged 73 in Los Angeles, California, on April 23, 1999, a few days after a tribute to her and Randy Weston's music at Harvard University. Her funeral at St. Peter's Church in Manhattan featured performances by Weston with Jann Parker, as well as by Chico O'Farrill's Afro-Cuban ensemble and by Lorenzo Shihab (vocals).

== Composing and arranging ==
Liston was already writing and arranging music while in high school, and she viewed that work as the central contribution of her career, stating on numerous occasions throughout her life that she preferred writing music to playing and soloing.

Her early work with the high-profile bands of Count Basie and Dizzy Gillespie shows a strong command of the big-band and bop idioms. She worked as an arranger for numerous recording companies, especially Motown, and arranged scores for dozens of high-profile musicians, including Clark Terry, Marvin Gaye, Mary Lou Williams, and Gloria Lynne.

However, perhaps her most important work was written for Randy Weston, with whom she collaborated on and off for four decades from the late 1950s into the 1990. Her work with Weston has been compared to the collaborations between Billy Strayhorn and Duke Ellington.

Liston worked as a ghostwriter during her career. According to one writer, "Many of the arrangements found in the Gillespie, Jones, and Weston repertoires were accomplished by Liston."

== Legacy ==
Liston was a female in a profession of mostly males. Although some consider her an unsung hero, she is highly regarded in the jazz community. Liston was a trailblazer as a trombonist, composer, and a woman. She articulated difficulties of being a woman on the road:

"There's those natural problems on the road, the female problems, the lodging problems, the laundry, and all those kinda things to try to keep yourself together, problems that somehow or other the guys don't seem to have to go through."

She goes on to recount the struggles she experienced as an African-American woman, which affected her musical career. However, she generally spoke positively about the camaraderie with, and support from, male musicians. Liston also dealt with larger issues of inequity in the music industry. One writer has said, "It was clear that she had to continually prove her credentials in order to gain suitable employment as a musician, composer, and arranger. She was not paid equitable scale and was often denied access to the larger opportunities as a composer and arranger."

== Musical style ==
Liston's musical style reflects bebop and post-bop sensibilities learned from Dexter Gordon, Dizzy Gillespie, and Art Blakey. Her earliest recorded work—such as Gordon's "Mischievous Lady" a tribute to her—her solos show a blend of motivic and linear improvisation, though they seem to make less use of extended harmonies and alterations.

Her arrangements, especially those with Weston, show a flexibility that transcends her musical upbringing in the bebop 1940s, whether working in the styles of swing, post-bop, African musics, or Motown. Her command of rhythmic gestures, grooves, and polyrhythms is particularly notable (as illustrated in Uhuru Afrika and Highlife). Her instrumental parts demonstrate an active use of harmonic possibilities; although her arrangements suggest relatively subdued interest in the explorations of free jazz ensembles, they use an extended tonal vocabulary, rich with altered harmonic voicings, thick layering, and dissonance. Her work throughout her career has been well received by both critics and audiences alike.

== Discography ==
=== As leader or co-leader ===
- Melba Liston and Her 'Bones (MetroJazz, 1959)
- Volcano Blues with Randy Weston (Antilles, 1993)

=== As sidewoman or guest ===
With Art Blakey & the Jazz Messengers

- 1959: Art Blakey Big Band
- 1958: Theory of Art
- 1966: Hold On, I'm Coming

With Betty Carter

- 1958: Out There with Betty Carter
- 1992: I Can't Help It – rec. 1958–1960

With Ray Charles

- 1959: The Genius of Ray Charles
- 1962: The Ray Charles Story, Vol. 2

With Dizzy Gillespie

- 1956: Jazz Recital
- 1956: World Statesman
- 1957: Dizzy Gillespie at Newport
- 1958: Birks' Works
- 1957: Dizzy in Greece

With Quincy Jones

- 1959: The Birth of a Band!
- 1960: Swiss Radio Days Jazz Series, Vol. 1
- 1961: I Dig Dancers
- 1961: Newport '61
- 1961: The Great Wide World of Quincy Jones: Live!
- 1962: The Quintessence
- 1963: Plays Hip Hits
- 1965: I/We Had a Ball
- 1965: Quincy Plays for Pussycats

With Jimmy Smith

- 1963: Any Number Can Win
- 1966: Jimmy & Wes: The Dynamic Duo
- 1966: Hoochie Cooche Man
- 1968: Further Adventures of Jimmy and Wes
- 1969: Jimmy Smith Plays the Blues

With Dinah Washington

- 1957: Dinah Washington Sings Fats Waller
- 1958: Dinah Sings Bessie Smith

With Randy Weston

- 1959: Little Niles
- 1959: Destry Rides Again
- 1959: Live at the Five Spot
- 1961: Uhuru Afrika
- 1963: Highlife – music from the new African nations featuring the Highlife
- 1974: Tanjah
- 1992: The Spirits of Our Ancestors
- 1997: Earth Birth
- 1998: Khepera

With others

- 1958: Last Chorus, Ernie Henry
- 1959: Tales of Manhattan, Babs Gonzales
- 1960: Trane Whistle, Eddie "Lockjaw" Davis
- 1961: African Waltz, Cannonball Adderley
- 1961: At Basin Street East, Billy Eckstine and Quincy Jones
- 1961: Rah, Mark Murphy
- 1961: The Chant, Sam Jones
- 1962: The Soul of Hollywood, Junior Mance
- 1962: Afro/American Sketches, Oliver Nelson
- 1962: Big Bags, Milt Jackson
- 1962: Bursting Out with the All-Star Big Band!, Oscar Peterson
- 1962: Rhythm Is My Business, Ella Fitzgerald
- 1962: The Complete Town Hall Concert, Charles Mingus
- 1964: The Body & the Soul, Freddie Hubbard
- 1964: Mary Lou Williams Presents Black Christ of the Andes, Mary Lou Williams
- 1965: And Then Again, Elvin Jones
- 1966: For Someone I Love, Milt Jackson
- 1966: Roll 'Em: Shirley Scott Plays the Big Bands, Shirley Scott
- 1967: A Mann & a Woman, Tamiko Jones and Herbie Mann
- 1968: Heads Up, Blue Mitchell
- 1968: Listen Here, Freddie McCoy
- 1970: Kim Kim Kim, Kim Weston
- 1973: That Lovin' Feelin', Junior Mance
- 1978: Skylark, Freddie Hubbard
