= Randy Weston =

American jazz pianist and composer (1926–2018)

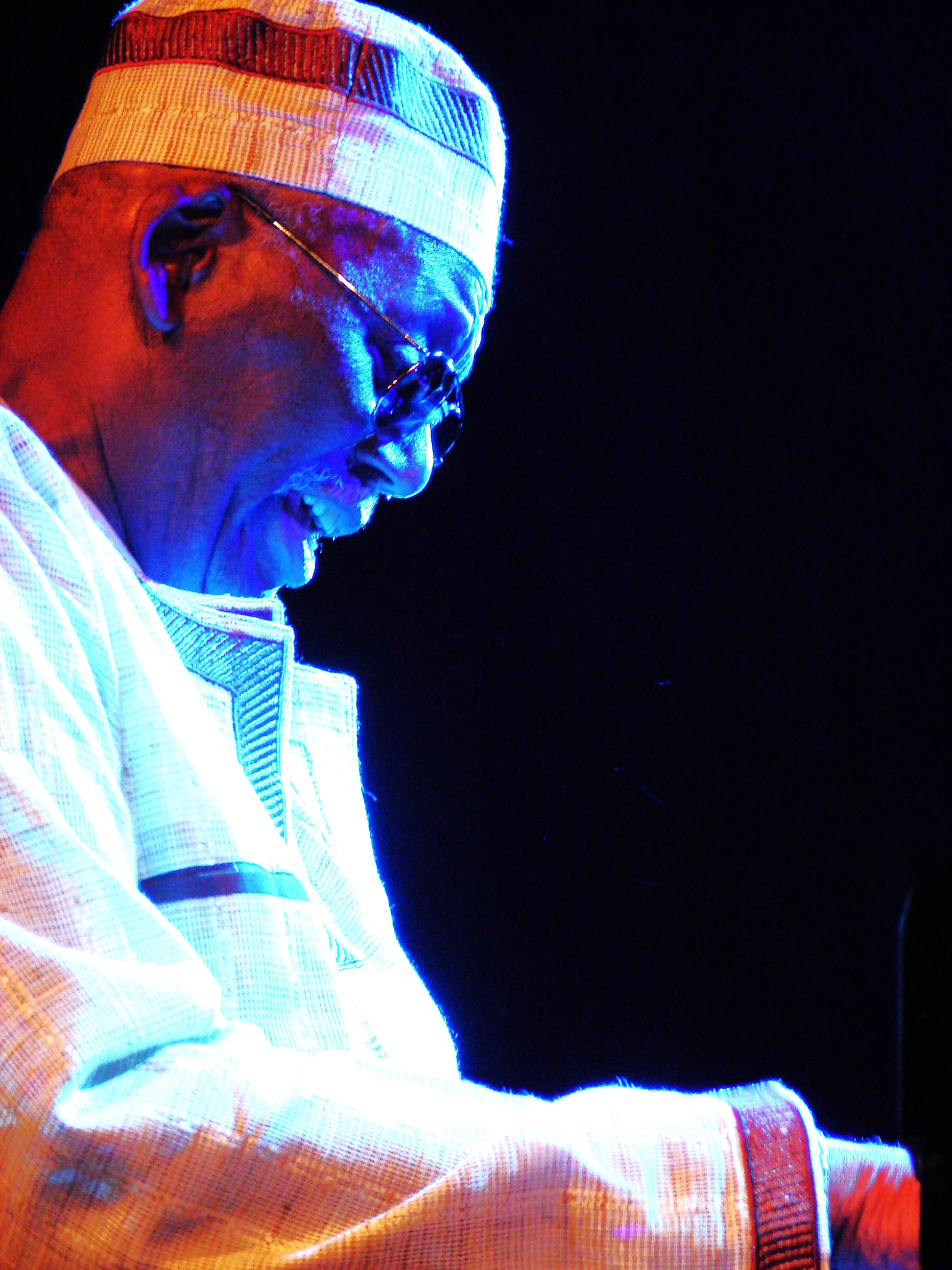
- Weston in 2007

Background information
- Born: Randolph Edward Weston; April 6, 1926; Brooklyn, New York City, U.S.
- Died: September 1, 2018 (aged 92) Brooklyn, New York City, U.S.
- Genres: Jazz, African jazz, world fusion
- Occupations: Musician, composer, bandleader
- Instrument: Piano
- Years active: 1950s–2018
- Labels: Riverside, Antilles, Verve, Motéma
- Website: randyweston.info
- Relatives: Wynton Kelly (cousin)

Randolph Edward "Randy" Weston (April 6, 1926 – September 1, 2018) was an American jazz pianist and composer whose creativity was inspired by his ancestral African connection.

Weston's piano style owed much to Duke Ellington and Thelonious Monk, whom he cited in a 2018 video as among pianists he counted as influences, as well as Count Basie, Nat King Cole, and Earl Hines. Beginning in the 1950s, Weston worked often with the trombonist and arranger Melba Liston.

Described as "America's African Musical Ambassador", Weston once said, "What I do I do because it's about teaching and informing everyone about our most natural cultural phenomenon. It's really about Africa and her music."

== Biography ==
=== Early life ===
Randolph Edward Weston was born on April 6, 1926, to Vivian (née Moore) and Frank Weston and was raised in Brooklyn, New York City, where his father owned a restaurant. His mother was from Virginia and his father was of Jamaican-Panamanian descent, a staunch Garveyite, who passed self-reliant values to his son. Weston studied classical piano as a child and took dance lessons. He graduated from Boys High School in Bedford–Stuyvesant, where he had been sent by his father because of the school's reputation for high standards. Weston took piano lessons from someone known as Professor Atwell who, unlike his former piano teacher, Mrs. Lucy Chapman, allowed him to play songs outside the classical music repertoire.

Drafted into the U.S. Army during World War II, Weston served three years from 1944, reaching the rank of staff sergeant, and was stationed for a year in Okinawa, Japan. On his return to Brooklyn, he ran his father's restaurant, which was frequented by many jazz musicians. Among Weston's piano heroes were Count Basie, Nat King Cole, Art Tatum, Duke Ellington, and his cousin Wynton Kelly, but it was Thelonious Monk who made the biggest impact, as Weston described in a 2003 interview: "When I first heard Monk, I heard Monk with Coleman Hawkins. When I heard Monk play, his sound, his direction, I just fell in love with it. I spent about three years just hanging out with Monk. I would pick him up in the car and bring him to Brooklyn and he was a great master because, for me, he put the magic back into the music."

=== Early career: 1940s–1950s ===
In the late 1940s, Weston began performing with Bull Moose Jackson, Frank Culley, and Eddie "Cleanhead" Vinson. In 1951, retreating from the atmosphere of drug use common on the New York jazz scene, Weston moved to Lenox, Massachusetts, in the Berkshires. There, at the Music Inn, a venue where jazz historian Marshall Stearns taught, Weston first learned about the African roots of jazz. He would return in subsequent summers to perform at the Music Inn, where he wrote his composition "Berkshire Blues", interacting with artists and intellectuals such as Geoffrey Holder, Babatunde Olatunji, Langston Hughes, and Willis Laurence James, about which experience Weston said, "I got a lot of my inspiration for African music by being at Music Inn. ... They were all explaining the African-American experience in a global perspective, which was unusual at the time."

Weston worked with Kenny Dorham in 1953, and in 1954 with Cecil Payne, before forming his own trio and quartet and releasing his debut recording as a leader in 1954: Cole Porter in a Modern Mood. Weston was voted New Star Pianist in DownBeat magazine's International Critics' Poll of 1955. Several albums followed, with the best-regarded being Little Niles near the end of the decade, dedicated to his children, Niles and Pamela, with all the tunes being written in 3/4 time. Melba Liston, as well as playing trombone on the record, provided arrangements for a sextet playing several of Weston's best compositions: the title track, "Earth Birth", "Babe's Blues", "Pam's Waltz", and others.

=== 1960s–1970s ===
In the 1960s, Weston's music prominently incorporated African elements, as shown on the large-scale suite Uhuru Afrika (1960; with the participation of poet Langston Hughes) and Highlife (full title: Music from the New African Nations featuring the Highlife), the latter recorded in 1963, two years after Weston traveled for the first time to Africa as part of a U.S. cultural exchange programme to Lagos, Nigeria (the contingent also including Langston Hughes, musicians Lionel Hampton and Ahmed Abdul-Malik, and singers Nina Simone and Brock Peters). On both these albums he teamed up with the arranger Melba Liston. Uhuru Afrika, or Freedom Africa, is considered a historic landmark album that celebrates several new African countries obtaining their independence.

In addition, during these years, his band often featured the tenor saxophonist Booker Ervin. Weston covered the Nigerian musician Bobby Benson's piece "Niger Mambo", which included Caribbean and jazz elements within a highlife style, and recorded this number many times throughout his career.

In 1967, Weston traveled throughout Africa with a U.S. cultural delegation. The last stop of the tour was Morocco, where he decided to settle, running his African Rhythms Club in Tangier for five years, from 1967 to 1972. He said in a 2015 interview, "We had everything in there from Chicago blues singers to singers from the Congo. ... The whole idea was to trace African people wherever we are and what we do with music."

In 1972, he produced Blue Moses for CTI Records, a best-selling record on which he plays electric piano. As he explained in a July 2018 interview, "We were still living in Tangier, so my son and I came from Tangier to do the recording, but when I got there, Creed Taylor said his formula is electric piano. I was not happy with that, but it was my only hit record. People loved it." In the summer of 1975, he played at the Festival of Tabarka in Tunisia (later known as the Tabarka Jazz Festival), accompanied by his son Azzedin Weston on percussion, with other notable acts including Dizzy Gillespie.

In 1977, Weston participated in FESTAC, the Second World Black and African Festival of Arts and Culture, held in Lagos; other musicians appearing there included Osibisa, Miriam Makeba, Bembeya Jazz, Louis Moholo, Dudu Pukwana, Donald Byrd, Stevie Wonder, and Sun Ra.

=== Later career ===
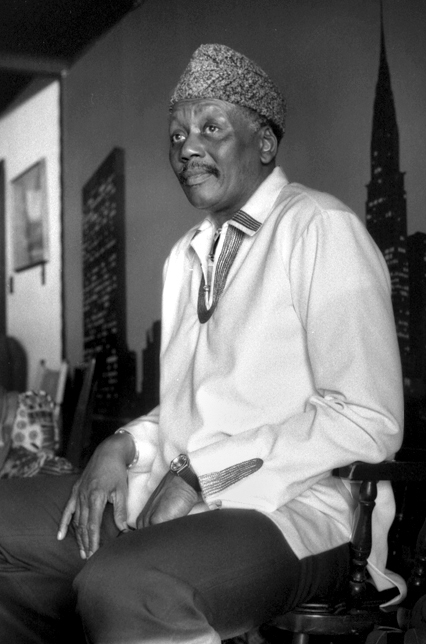
Weston on February 19, 1984

For a long stretch, Weston recorded infrequently on smaller record labels. He also made a two-CD recording titled The Spirits of Our Ancestors (recorded 1991, released 1992), which featured arrangements by his long-time collaborator Melba Liston. The album contained new, expanded versions of many of his well-known pieces and featured an ensemble including some African musicians, with guests such as Dizzy Gillespie and Pharoah Sanders also contributing. The music director was saxophonist Talib Kibwe (also known as T. K. Blue), who subsequently continued in that role. The Spirits of Our Ancestors has been described as "one of the most imaginative explorations of 'world jazz' ever recorded."

Weston produced a series of albums in a variety of formats: solo, trio, mid-sized groups, and collaborations with the Gnawa musicians of Morocco. His most popular compositions include "Hi-Fly", which he said was inspired by his experience of being 6 ft 8 in (2.03 m) and looking down at the ground, "Little Niles", named for his son (who was later known as Azzedin), "African Sunrise", "Blue Moses", "The Healers", and "Berkshire Blues". Weston's compositions have frequently been recorded by such prominent musicians as Abdullah Ibrahim, Houston Person, and Booker Ervin, among others.

A five-night celebration of Weston's music took place at the Montreal Jazz Festival in 1995, featuring Gnawa musicians and a duet with saxophonist David Murray.

In 2002, Weston performed with bassist James Lewis for the inauguration of the Bibliotheca Alexandrina in Alexandria, Egypt. The same year, Weston performed with Gnawa musicians at Canterbury Cathedral at the invitation of the Archbishop of Canterbury. Weston also played at the Kamigamo Shrine in Japan in 2008.

On June 21, 2009, he participated in a memorial at the Jazz Gallery in New York for the Ghanaian drummer Kofi Ghanaba (formerly known as Guy Warren), whose composition "Love, the Mystery of..." Weston used as his theme for some 40 years.

In 2013, Sunnyside Records released Weston's album The Roots of the Blues, a duo session with tenor saxophonist Billy Harper. On November 17, 2014, as part of the London Jazz Festival, Weston played a duo concert with Harper at the Queen Elizabeth Hall. Reviewing the event, Kevin Le Gendre said the two musicians reached "the kind of advanced conversational intimacy only master players achieve".

In 2015, Weston was artist-in-residence at The New School in New York, participating in a lecture series, performing, and mentoring students.

Weston celebrated his 90th birthday in 2016 with a concert at Carnegie Hall, among other activities, and continued thereafter to tour and speak internationally. He performed at the Gnawa Festival in Morocco in April 2016, took part in the Spoleto Festival in Charleston, South Carolina, on June 2, and was among the opening acts at the 50th Montreux Jazz Festival. In July 2016, he was a keynote speaker at the 32nd World Conference of the International Society for Music Education in Glasgow.

An African Nubian Suite (2017) is a recording of a concert at the Institute of African American Affairs of New York University on April 8, 2012, Easter Sunday, with Cecil Bridgewater, Robert Trowers, Howard Johnson, T. K. Blue, Billy Harper, Alex Blake, Lewis Nash, Candido, Ayodele Maakheru, Lhoussine Bouhamidy, Saliou Souso, Martin Kwaku Obeng, Min Xiao-Fen, Tanpani Demda Cissoko, Neil Clarke and Ayanda Clarke, and the poet Jayne Cortez. Describing it as an "epic work", the Black Grooves reviewer wrote that The African Nubian Suite "traces the history of the human race through music, with a narration by inspirational speaker Wayne B. Chandler, and introductions and stories by Weston in his role as griot.... Stressing the unity of humankind, Weston incorporates music that 'stretches across millennia'—from the Nubian region along the Nile Delta, to the holy city of Touba in Senegal, to China's Shang dynasty, as well as African folk music and African American blues.... In these troubling times when our nation is divided by politics, race and religion, Weston uses The African Nubian Suite as a vehicle to remind us of our common heritage: 'We all come from the same place – we all come from Africa.'" Coinciding with his 91st birthday, Weston played four shows at the Jazz Standard, April 6–April 9, 2017, performing music from An African Nubian Suite.

Weston's last release, the double-CD set titled Sound (2018), was a recording of a solo piano concert that took place at the Hotel Montreux Palace, Switzerland, on July 17 and 18, 2001. In a review for The Wall Street Journal, Larry Blumenfeld wrote: "If these two discs amount to a grand gesture, Mr. Weston communicates most and best via small details. The power of a single note. The meaning of a single note repeated many times. The force of a crashing left-hand figure. The tension held between two dissonant tones or within an unexpected silence. All of which are packed into the three-plus minutes of 'Love, The Mystery Of,' which was composed by the Ghanaian drummer Kofi Ghanaba (then known as Guy Warren) for Mr. Weston's 1963 album 'Highlife,' and now, more than a half-century later, provides this album's most riveting moments."

Randy Weston died at his home in Brooklyn on the morning of September 1, 2018, aged 92.

== Personal life ==
Weston's first marriage, to Mildred Mosley, ended in divorce. His son Azzedin having predeceased him, Weston was survived by his wife Fatoumata Mbengue-Weston, whom he met in 1994; three daughters, Cheryl, Pamela and Kim; seven grandchildren; six great-grandchildren; and one great-great-grandchild.

== Autobiography ==
In October 2010, Duke University Press published African Rhythms: The Autobiography of Randy Weston, "composed by Randy Weston, arranged by Willard Jenkins". It was hailed as "an important addition to the jazz historiography and a long anticipated read for fans of this giant of African American music, aka jazz." Reviewer Larry Reni Thomas wrote: "Randy Weston's long-anticipated, much-talked-about, consciousness-raising, African-centered autobiography, African Rhythms, is a serious breath of fresh air and is a much-needed antidote in this world of mediocre musicians, and men. He takes the reader on a wonderful, exciting journey from America to Africa and back with the ease of a person who loved every minute of it. The book is hard to put down and is an engaging, pleasing literary work that is worthy of being required reading in any history or literature school course."

== Archives ==
In 2015–16, Weston's archives were acquired by the Jazz Research Initiative in collaboration with the Hutchins Center for African and African American Research, Loeb Music Library, the Harvard College Library, and the Dean of the Faculty of Arts and Sciences. The Randy Weston Collection comprises hundreds of manuscripts, scores, videos, films, photographs, and more than 1,000 tape recordings, and among its highlights are correspondence with Langston Hughes and Alvin Ailey; photographs with Dizzy Gillespie, Pharoah Sanders, Muhammad Ali, and Cornel West; and records of Weston's African Rhythms Club in Tangier, Morocco, from 1967 to 1972.

== Awards and honors ==
- 1997: Order of Arts and Letters, France
- 1999: Swing Journal Award, Japan
- 2000: Black Star Award, Arts Critics and Reviewers Association of Ghana (ACRAG)
- 2001: NEA Jazz Master
- 2006: Honorary degree, Brooklyn College, City University of New York
- 2009: Giants of Jazz concert in his honor with Monty Alexander, Geri Allen, Cyrus Chestnut, Barry Harris, Mulgrew Miller and Billy Taylor.
- 2011: Guggenheim Fellowship award.
- 2011: Honored by King Mohammed VI of Morocco for "lifelong engagement with Morocco and deep commitment to bringing Morocco's Gnaoua music tradition to the attention of the Western world"
- 2011: Honored by Congressional Black Caucus Foundation at the Jazz Issue Forum and Concert during the 40th Annual Legislative Conference
- 2012: Honorary degree of Doctor of Music from Colby College
- 2013: Honorary degree, New England Conservatory of Music
- 2014: Doris Duke Artist Award
- 2014: JJA Jazz Award, Trio or Duo of the Year: Randy Weston – Billy Harper
- 2015: JJA Jazz Award, Lifetime Achievement in Jazz
- 2016: Malcolm X Black Unity award, National Association of Kawaida Organizations (NAKO) with the International African Arts Festival (IAAF)
- 2016: DownBeat Hall of Fame.
- 2016: United States Artists Fellowship Award
- 2017: National Jazz Museum in Harlem Legends Award

== Discography ==
=== As leader ===
- 1954: Cole Porter in a Modern Mood (Riverside) - 10-inch LP
- 1955: The Randy Weston Trio (Riverside) - 10-inch LP
- 1955: Get Happy with the Randy Weston Trio (Riverside)
- 1956: With These Hands... (Riverside)
- 1955–56: Trio and Solo (Riverside) - includes all tracks on The Randy Weston Trio
- 1956: Jazz à la Bohemia (Riverside)
- 1956: The Modern Art of Jazz by Randy Weston (Dawn) - also released as How High the Moon (Biograph)
- 1957: Piano á la Mode (Jubilee)
- 1958: New Faces at Newport (MetroJazz)
- 1959: Little Niles (United Artists)
- 1959: Destry Rides Again (United Artists)
- 1959: Live at the Five Spot (United Artists)
- 1960: Uhuru Afrika (Roulette)
- 1963: Highlife (Colpix)
- 1964: Randy (Bakton) - later released as African Cookbook (Atlantic) in 1972
- 1965: Berkshire Blues (Freedom [1977])
- 1964–65: Blues (Trip)
- 1966: Monterey '66 (Verve)
- 1969: African Cookbook (Polydor)
- 1969: Niles Littlebig (Polydor)
- 1972: Blue Moses (CTI)
- 1973: Tanjah (Polydor)
- 1974: Carnival (Freedom)
- 1974: Informal Solo Piano (Hi-Fly)
- 1975: Blues to Africa (Freedom)
- 1975: African Nite (Owl)
- 1975: African Rhythms (Chant du Monde)
- 1976: Randy Weston Meets Himself (Pausa)
- 1976: Perspective (Denon)
- 1978: Rhythms-Sounds Piano (Cora)
- 1984: Blue (Arch)
- 1987: The Healers (Black Saint) - with David Murray
- 1989: Portraits of Thelonious Monk: Well You Needn't (Verve)
- 1989: Portraits of Duke Ellington: Caravan (Verve)
- 1989: Self Portraits: The Last Day (Verve)
- 1991: The Spirits of Our Ancestors (Verve)
- 1992: Marrakech in the Cool of the Evening (Verve/Gitanes)
- 1992: The Splendid Master Gnawa Musicians of Morocco (Verve/Gitanes)
- 1993: Volcano Blues (Verve/Gitanes)
- 1995: Saga (Verve)
- 1997: Earth Birth [featuring Montreal String Orchestra] (Verve)
- 1998: Khepera (Verve)
- 1999: Spirit! The Power of Music (Arkadia Jazz)
- 2002: Ancient Future (Mutable)
- 2003: Live In St. Lucia (image ID-3007RW)
- 2004: Nuit Africa (Enja)
- 2006: Zep Tepi (Random Chance)
- 2009: The Storyteller (Motéma)
- 2013: The Roots of the Blues (Sunnyside)
- 2017: The African Nubian Suite (African Rhythms)
- 2018: Sound — Solo Piano (African Rhythms)

=== As sideman ===
With Roy Brooks

- Duet in Detroit (Enja, 1984 [1993])

With Charles Mingus

- Charles Mingus and Friends in Concert (Columbia, 1972)
