= In Concert (Ahmad Jamal album) =

Live album by Ahmad Jamal
- Released: 1981
- Recorded: January 26, 1981
- Genre: Jazz
- Label: Personal Choice Records; PC-51004
- Producer: John Whited, Gary Burton, Jean-Claude Ast

Ahmad Jamal chronology
| Live at Bubba's (1981) | In Concert (1981) | American Classical Music (1982) |

Professional ratings
Review scores
| Source | Rating |
|---|---|
| Allmusic | 4/5 stars |

In Concert is a live album by American jazz pianist Ahmad Jamal. Its full title is Ahmad Jamal/Gary Burton in Concert.

It was recorded at the Palais des Festivals et des Congrès in Cannes, France on January 26, 1981 and released on Personal Choice Records later that year.

== Reception ==
The Allmusic review awarded the album 4 stars, with Scott Yanow stating, "From the same concert that resulted in the Chiaroscuro LP Live In Concert, this worthy performance (still only available as an out-of-print LP) features the 1981 Ahmad Jamal Trio (consisting of the pianist/leader, bassist Sabu Adeyola and drummer Payton Crossley) stretching out on 'Morning of the Carnival' and Chick Corea's 'Tones for Joan's Bones.' The other three numbers ('One,' 'Bogata' and 'Autumn Leaves') add vibraphonist Gary Burton to the group, and the Burton-Jamal combination works quite well on what was a successful but only one-time collaboration."

== Track list ==
1. "Morning Of The Carnival" (Luiz Bonfá, Antônio Maria) 10:55
2. "One" (Sigidi Abdullah) 9:53
3. "Bogota" (Richard Evans) 10:36
4. "Tones For Joan's Bones" (Chick Corea) 4:41
5. "Autumn Leaves" (Joseph Kosma, Jacques Prévert) 6:00

== Personnel ==
- Ahmad Jamal – piano
- Gary Burton – Vibraphone
- Sabu Adeyola – double bass
- Payton Crossley – drums
