= In Person (Vince Guaraldi album) =

Live album by Vince Guaraldi
- Released: June 10, 1963
- Recorded: December 4, 1962
- Venues: The Trident Jazz Club (Sausalito, California)
- Genres: Latin jazz; Bossa nova
- Length: 36:21
- Labels: Fantasy (U.S.); Vocalion (UK)

Vince Guaraldi chronology
Jazz Impressions of Black Orpheus (1962)	In Person (1963)	Vince Guaraldi, Bola Sete and Friends (1963)

Singles from In Person
- 1. "Zelao" Released: 1963

In Person (also known as Vince Guaraldi "In Person") is a live performance album by jazz pianist Vince Guaraldi, released in the U.S. on June 10, 1963 on Fantasy Records. It was released as a follow-up to his album Jazz Impressions of Black Orpheus which featured the surprise hit song "Cast Your Fate to the Wind".

The concert was recorded live at The Trident Jazz Club in Sausalito, California, on December 4, 1962.

== Reception ==
Professional ratings
Review scores
Source	Rating
AllMusic	4/5 stars
Five Cents Please	3/5 stars
The Penguin Guide to Jazz Recordings	2.5/4 stars
Record Mirror	4/5 stars

=== Contemporary ===
Cashbox magazine cited the single "Zelao"/"Jitterbug Waltz" from In Person as a Best Bet: "Vince Guaraldi, who scored last time out with 'Cast Your Fate to the Winds' [sic], could duplicate that success with this top-flight bossa nova follow-up stanza. The tune is a contagious, easy-going lyrical ballad with a danceable, rapidly-changing beat."

In the album's liner notes, Ralph J. Gleason praised Guaraldi's performance style, noting, "What Vince has got in his playing is feeling. This is a quality that money can't buy, practice cannot make perfect and technique tends to defeat rather than enhance. Vince sings when he plays. I don't mean he grunts or hums or even makes a noise at all. I mean his fingers sing, the music sings, and he writhes and twists on the piano stool like a balancing act in the circus."

The DownBeat critic agreed: "In a period when there seems to be a plethora of bland, sound-alike jazz pianists, Guaraldi is a refreshing relief. [He] has an exceptional knack for catching and projecting the spirit of a tune, for finding the essence of the piece, and bringing strength and validity to his exposition of it. This is honest piano playing, with no phoney soul, no gimmicks, no pretense. It's a rare quality to find on a record these days."

=== Retrospective ===
AllMusic critic Richard S. Ginell called In Person "a defining album for Guaraldi in his natural habitat" (a jazz club setting), adding that the album captures the musician "at his most winning."

Why It Matters blogger James Stafford cited In Person as capturing "the pianist in that brief moment when he was enjoying his first great national success with 'Cast Your Fate To the Wind' but hadn’t yet been transformed into a household name by Peanuts. It’s a beautiful record, filled with blues, bebop, and bossa nova, but for sheer plaster-a-smile-on-your-face delight nothing beats his take on the Mediterranean traditional song 'Misirlou'."

== Track listing ==
Side One
No.	Title	Writer(s)	Length
1.	"Zelao"	Sérgio Ricardo	4:30
2.	"On Green Dolphin Street"	Bronisław Kaper; Ned Washington	5:53
3.	"Misirlou"	Fred Wise; Milton Leeds	4:30
4.	"Forgive Me If I'm Late"	Carlos Lyra; Ronaldo Bôscoli	2:41

Side Two
No.	Title	Writer(s)	Length
5.	"Jitterbug Waltz"	Fats Waller; Charles Randolph Grean; Maxine Manners	5:32
6.	"Outra Vez" ("Again")	Antônio Carlos Jobim	2:53
7.	"Freeway"	Vince Guaraldi	3:45
8.	"The Love of a Rose"	Antônio Maria; Pernambuco	2:43
9.	"Chora Tua Tristeza" ("Cry Your Blues Away")	Luvercy Fiorini; Oscar Castro-Neves	3:49
Total length:			36:21

== Personnel ==
Vince Guaraldi Quintet

- Vince Guaraldi – piano
- Eddie Duran – guitars
- Fred Marshall – double bass
- Colin Bailey – drums
- Benny Valarde – güiro

Additional

- Ralph J. Gleason – liner notes

== Release history ==
Country	Date	Label	Format	Catalogue number
United States	1963	Fantasy	Mono LP	3352
United States	1963	Fantasy	Stereo LP	8352
United Kingdom	1963	Vocalion	Mono LP	LAE-F 597
United States	1975	Fantasy	Stereo LP	8352
United States	1997	Fantasy/Original Jazz Classics	Stereo CD	OJCCD-951-2, F-8352

== See also ==
- Vince Guaraldi discography
- List of songs recorded by Vince Guaraldi
- List of cover versions of Vince Guaraldi songs
- Lee Mendelson Film Productions
