= Breno Mello =

Brazilian athlete and actor (1931–2008)

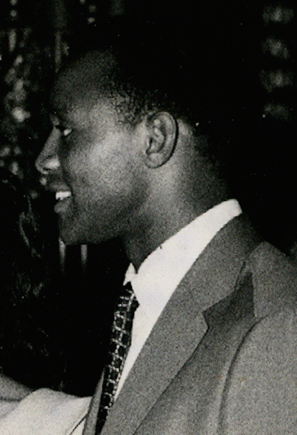
- Breno Mello (1959).
- Born: Breno Higino de Mello; September 7, 1931; Porto Alegre, Rio Grande do Sul, Brazil
- Died: July 14, 2008 (aged 76); Porto Alegre, Rio Grande do Sul, Brazil

Breno Higino de Mello (September 7, 1931 – July 14, 2008) was a Brazilian athlete and actor. He is primarily known for playing the title role in the 1959 film Orfeu Negro (Black Orpheus).

== Biography ==
Mello was born in Porto Alegre, the capital of Rio Grande do Sul, a state of Southern Brazil. In the beginning of his career, Breno Mello was a soccer player. He played soccer for Renner, Corinthians, Fluminense, and also for Santos FC, where he met Pelé. Mello was walking in Rio de Janeiro, when director Marcel Camus stopped him and asked if he would like to be in a film. Camus cast Mello to star in the classic 1959 film Orfeu Negro (Black Orpheus), in which Mello played the role of Orfeu. Camus was "fascinated" by his physical beauty, which was an essential aspect of the character of Orfeu envisioned by Camus.

The film reinterpreted the Orpheus myth against the backdrop of the poverty of the Brazilian working class and Brazil's famous Carnaval. The film made extensive use of bossa nova music, including now famous songs such as "A Felicidade" and "Manhã de Carnaval" (also known as "A Day in the Life of a Fool"), which were sung by the character of Orfeu. While Mello acted the part of Orfeu, his singing voice was dubbed by Agostinho dos Santos.

Orfeu was the most successful role of Mello's acting career. Reviews of his performance, however, are mixed. Bosley Crowther, reviewing the film for The New York Times in 1959, criticized his acting, stating: "He performs the role more as a dancer than as an actor trying to show a man in love." On the other hand, Mello's performance has also been described as natural, reflecting real talent. Hollis Alpert, writing for the Saturday Review, called the actors' performances "admirable." Critics agreed that Mello looked the part: the otherwise negative review of Mello in The New York Times stated that he was "a handsome, virile Orpheus who glistens when covered with sweat."

The film won the Palme d'Or at the 1959 Cannes Film Festival, as well as the 1960 Academy Award for Best Foreign Language Film, and the 1960 Golden Globe Award for Best Foreign Film. Mello was not part of the group representing the film for these awards. However, more than 40 years later, Mello attended the Cannes festival at the expense of the Brazilian government, and with the invitation of the producers of the 2005 documentary In Search of Black Orpheus (Em Busca do Orfeu negro / À la recherche d'Orfeu Negro (Brasil/França, 2005)), by Bernard Tournois and René Letzgus.

Mello appeared in several other films, including Rata de puerto (1963), Os Vencidos (1963), O Santo Módico (1964), O Negrinho do Pastoreio (1973) and Prisoner of Rio (1988). However, Mello was unable to maintain regular employment as an actor. Shortly before his death, Mello gave his view of why his acting career had not been more successful, saying: "Brazilian cinema at that time didn't have financing. I couldn't support myself with movies, and so, I went back to soccer." ["O cinema brasileiro não tinha financiamento na época. Não podia me sustentar com o cinema e, por isso, retornei ao futebol."] In 2004, Mello returned to film, appearing in the documentary In Search of Black Orpheus (in which he portrayed himself) to talk about the impact that the movie Black Orpheus had on the world of Brazilian music, such as Bossa Nova and samba. However, the filmmakers of this documentary had to search for Mello in order to secure his participation in the film.

Mello also lived in Florianópolis, Santa Catarina, where he met Amelina Santos Corrêa, also known as Mana. He had his youngest daughter, Letícia, with her. Mello died in his hometown of Porto Alegre, Brazil, at the age of 76 years on July 14, 2008, from a heart attack. His Black Orpheus co-star, American-born actress Marpessa Dawn, died 42 days later of a heart attack, in Paris, France. She was 74.

== Filmography ==
- Prisoner of Rio (1988), Silencio
- O Negrinho do Pastoreio (1973), Negro
- O Santo Módico (1964)
- San Rata de puerto (1963)
- Os Vencidos (1963)
- Orfeu Negro (Black Orpheus) (1959), Orpheus
