= Os Bandeirantes =

1960 film by Marcel Camus

- Directed by: Marcel Camus
- Screenplay by: Marcel Camus; Rubem Braga; Louis Sapan
- Starring: Lourdes de Oliveira; Raymond Loyer; Elga Andersen; Léa Garcia
- Edited by: Andrée Feix
- Music by: Gene Roland; Henri Crolla; Antoine Bonfanti
- Release date: 28 October 1960
- Running time: 109 minutes
- Countries: Brazil; France
- Language: Portuguese

Os Bandeirantes (English: The Pioneers) is a black-and-white 1960 French-Brazilian adventure film directed by Marcel Camus. The film is also known in English as Gold of the Amazon.

== Plot ==
In Brazil, a French diamond miner is shot, robbed, and left for dead by a supposed friend. He sets out on a mission of revenge, but along the way falls in love with a Brazilian woman.

== Cast ==
- Raymond Loyer as Jean
- Lourdes de Oliveira as Suzana
- Elga Andersen as Elga
- Léa Garcia as Hermina
- Almiro do Esperito Santo as Baija-Flora
- John Reich as Curd

== Production ==
The film was partially shot in Brasília, Canindé-Ceará, Fortaleza, Belém and Salvador .

== Reception ==
The film was rather well received but not as well as Camus's precedent Brazilian film, Black Orpheus. Camus's other Brazilian film would be Bahia, in 1976.
