= Jazz Impressions of Black Orpheus =

1962 studio album by Vince Guaraldi

Studio album by Vince Guaraldi
- Released: April 18, 1962
- Recorded: November 1961; February 1962
- Studios: KQED television studio, San Francisco, California
- Genre: Jazz
- Length: 39:11 (original 1962 release); 61:44 (2010 remaster); 120:05 (60th anniversary edition)
- Labels: Fantasy (US); Vocalion (UK)
- Producer: Nick Phillips (2010 remaster)

Vince Guaraldi chronology
A Flower Is a Lovesome Thing (1958)	Jazz Impressions of Black Orpheus (1962)	In Person (1963)

Singles from Jazz Impressions of Black Orpheus
- 1. "Samba de Orpheus"/"Cast Your Fate to the Wind" Released: July 1962

Alternate cover
- Later pressings with placement of "Cast Your Fate to the Wind" and album title reversed

Professional ratings
Review scores
Source	Rating
AllMusic	5/5 stars
The Rolling Stone Jazz Record Guide	3/5 stars
Five Cents Please	5/5 stars
New Record Mirror	4/5 stars
The Penguin Guide to Jazz Recordings	2/4 stars

Jazz Impressions of Black Orpheus is a 1962 album by American jazz pianist Vince Guaraldi (credited to the Vince Guaraldi Trio). Initially intended as a jazz response to the 1959 film Black Orpheus, the album is best known for including the original composition "Cast Your Fate to the Wind", which became a surprise commercial hit and won Guaraldi a Grammy Award for Best Original Jazz Composition.

== Background and recording ==
Inspiration for the album stemmed from Guaraldi's admiration of the film Orfeu Negro (Black Orpheus), which introduced international audiences to Brazilian bossa nova through its score by Antônio Carlos Jobim and Luiz Bonfá. The film had received widespread acclaim, including the Palme d'Or and the Academy Award for Best International Feature Film. Guaraldi, drawn to the music's rhythmic complexity and melodic warmth, developed jazz arrangements based on its themes.

During the latter half of 1961, Guaraldi circulated a four-song demo featuring Black Orpheus material but did not find immediate label interest. He ultimately returned to Fantasy Records, where two sessions were arranged at KQED-TV in San Francisco.

The first session took place in November 1961 with Guaraldi's trio consisting of bassist Monty Budwig and drummer Colin Bailey. Although the project focused on Black Orpheus, these sessions primarily featured interpretations of American standards, including "Since I Fell for You" and "Moon River". The trio also recorded multiple takes of "Jitterbug Waltz", capturing varying approaches to phrasing and tempo. A second session in February 1962 produced the final album tracks. By this point, the group had refined their interpretations of the bossa nova pieces and two Guaraldi originals. According to Bailey, the session proceeded quickly due to the trio's familiarity with the repertoire.

The group's handling of "Samba de Orfeu", "Manhã de Carnaval", and "A Felicidade" emphasized rhythmic clarity and melodic restraint, avoiding the stiffness of some contemporary American bossa nova efforts. Guaraldi's piano playing maintained a lyrical, relaxed character while Budwig and Bailey offered understated support. Guaraldi's arrangements were simple but crafted to highlight the trio's interplay. Several alternate takes, including a longer version of "Samba de Orfeu", were later released.

Alternate takes of "Manhã de Carnaval" featured a slower, more expressive tempo. "O Nosso Amor" allowed Guaraldi space to explore brighter melodic ideas across three variations, each marked by subtle shifts in touch and phrasing.

== "Cast Your Fate to the Wind" ==
Although the album centered on material from Black Orpheus, it was Guaraldi's original piece "Cast Your Fate to the Wind" that became its defining track. Initially issued as the B-side of the "Samba de Orfeu" single, the tune gained attention after receiving regular radio play in Sacramento. It ultimately reached the Billboard Top 40 and earned Guaraldi a Grammy Award for Best Original Jazz Composition.

Musically, the piece featured shifting dynamics and a relaxed swing feel. Bailey recalled the logistical difficulty of switching between brushes and sticks during the performance, but the recording captured a seamless and fluid execution.

The single's success led Fantasy Records to rebrand later pressings of the album, prominently displaying the track's title on the cover and downplaying the original Black Orpheus theme.

== Release ==
Jazz Impressions of Black Orpheus was released in April 1962. Original pressings displayed the album title prominently, while later editions were reissued with "Cast Your Fate to the Wind" featured as the apparent album title. This change was intended to capitalize on the single’s popularity.

== Critical reception ==
Contemporary reviews were favorable. A 1962 Billboard feature noted that Guaraldi and his trio presented the Black Orpheus themes with "sensitivity and style," and singled out "Cast Your Fate to the Wind" for its distinctiveness.

Cashbox also praised the trio's interpretation of the film score, describing the music as having "exceptional merit" and noting the trio's rhythmic vitality.

== Influence and legacy ==
Jazz Impressions of Black Orpheus emerged during a period of growing American interest in bossa nova, coinciding with efforts by artists such as Stan Getz, João Gilberto, and Antonio Carlos Jobim. While Guaraldi's contribution has sometimes been overshadowed, Jazz Impressions of Black Orpheus played a key role in introducing Brazilian musical idioms to a jazz context.

Guaraldi further explored these styles in his subsequent collaborations with guitarist Bola Sete, notably on the album Vince Guaraldi, Bola Sete and Friends (1963). His intuitive sense of rhythm and melodic form allowed him to integrate Latin and jazz elements with greater ease than many of his contemporaries.

=== Reissues ===
Jazz Impressions of Black Orpheus was re-released in 1983 in a half-speed mastered edition by Mobile Fidelity Sound Lab. Another remastered version was released with five bonus tracks on Fantasy Records imprint, Original Jazz Classics label, on September 28, 2010. In addition, DCC Compact Classics issued the album on a Gold CD in 1993.

A 60th anniversary remastered edition sourced from original master and analog tapes was released in CD and digital formats on November 18, 2022, by Craft Recordings. A 3-LP vinyl set was released on February 23, 2023.

== Track listing ==
=== Original 1962 release ===
Side 1
No.	Title	Writer(s)	Length
1.	"Samba De Orfeu" ("Orpheus Samba"; aka "Samba de Orpheus")	Luiz Bonfá	5:42
2.	"Manhã de Carnaval" ("Carnival Morning")	Luiz Bonfá	5:50
3.	"O Nosso Amor" ("Our Love")	Antônio Carlos Jobim	4:56
4.	"A Felicidade (Happiness)" (mistitled "Generique")	Antônio Carlos Jobim	4:49

Side 2
No.	Title	Writer(s)	Length
5.	"Cast Your Fate to the Wind"	Vince Guaraldi	3:10
6.	"Moon River"	Henry Mancini	5:21
7.	"Alma-Ville"	Vince Guaraldi	5:00
8.	"Since I Fell for You"	Buddy Johnson	4:23
Total length:			39:11

=== Original Jazz Classics CD remaster (2010) ===
Bonus tracks
No.	Title	Writer(s)	Length
9.	"Samba De Orfeu" (single edit, aka "Samba de Orpheus")	Luiz Bonfá	3:18
10.	"Manhã de Carnaval" (Take 2)	Luiz Bonfá	6:17
11.	"O Nosso Amor" (Take 2)	Antônio Carlos Jobim	5:00
12.	"Felicidade" (Take 3)	Traditional	4:54
13.	"Cast Your Fate to the Wind" (Take 3)	Vince Guaraldi	3:04
Total length:			61:44

=== 60th Anniversary Deluxe reissue (2022) ===
Disc 1
No.	Title	Writer(s)	Length
1.	"Samba de Orpheu (Orpheus Samba)" (aka "Samba de Orpheus")	Luiz Bonfá	5:42
2.	"Manhã de Carnaval (Carnival Morning)"	Luiz Bonfá	5:50
3.	"O Nosso Amor (Our Love)"	Antônio Carlos Jobim	4:56
4.	"A Felicidade (Happiness)"	Antônio Carlos Jobim	4:49
5.	"Cast Your Fate to the Wind"	Vince Guaraldi	3:10
6.	"Moon River"	Henry Mancini	5:21
7.	"Alma-Ville"	Vince Guaraldi	5:00
8.	"Since I Fell for You"	Buddy Johnson	4:23
9.	"Samba de Orpheu" (Short Version: Take 1, Set 3, Previously Unreleased, aka "Samba de Orpheus")	Luiz Bonfá	3:31
10.	"Samba de Orpheu" (Long Version: Take 1, Set 3, Previously Unreleased, aka "Samba de Orpheus")	Luiz Bonfá	5:52
11.	"Manhã de Carnaval" (Take 1, Set 3, Previously Unreleased)	Luiz Bonfá	6:35
12.	"Manhã de Carnaval" (Take 2, Set 3)	Luiz Bonfá	6:15

Disc 2
No.	Title	Writer(s)	Length
13.	"Nosso Amor" (Take 1, Set 3, Previously Unreleased)	Antônio Carlos Jobim	5:09
14.	"Nosso Amor" (Take 2, Set 4, Previously Unreleased)	Antônio Carlos Jobim	5:00
15.	"Felicidade" (Take 2, Set 2)	Antônio Carlos Jobim	4:54
16.	"Felicidade" (Take 4, Set 3 Previously Unreleased)	Antônio Carlos Jobim	5:07
17.	"Cast Your Fate to the Wind" (Take 2, Previously Unreleased)	Vince Guaraldi	3:07
18.	"Cast Your Fate to the Wind" (Take 3)	Vince Guaraldi	3:08
19.	"Cast Your Fate to the Wind" (Take 5, Previously Unreleased)	Vince Guaraldi	3:05
20.	"Alma-Ville" (Take 2, Previously Unreleased)	Vince Guaraldi	5:07
21.	"Since I Fell for You" (Take 3, Previously Unreleased)	Buddy Johnson	4:26
22.	"Jitterbug Waltz" (Take 1, Previously Unreleased)	Fats Waller; Charles Randolph Grean; Maxine Manners	6:57
23.	"Jitterbug Waltz" (Take 1A, Previously Unreleased)	Fats Waller; Charles Randolph Grean; Maxine Manners	6:29
24.	"Jitterbug Waltz" (Take 2A, Previously Unreleased)	Fats Waller; Charles Randolph Grean; Maxine Manners	6:37
Total length:			120:05

== Personnel ==
Vince Guaraldi Trio

- Vince Guaraldi – piano
- Colin Bailey – drums
- Monty Budwig – double bass

Additional

- Ray Fowler – engineer
- Bernie Grundman – engineer (2022 remaster)
- Ralph J. Gleason – liner notes
- Derrick Bang – liner notes (2010, 2022 small batch 180-gram vinyl pressing)
- Andrew Gilbert – liner notes (2022 remaster)

== Release history ==
Region	Date	Label	Format	Catalog
United States	April 18, 1962	Fantasy Records	mono LP	3337
United States	1990	Fantasy, Original Jazz Classics	CD	OJCCD-437-25
United States	2010	Fantasy, Original Jazz Classics	mp3	OJC-32328-25
United States	2022	Craft Recordings	CD, LP, Digital	CR00543

== See also ==
- Vince Guaraldi discography
- List of songs recorded by Vince Guaraldi
- List of cover versions of Vince Guaraldi songs
- Lee Mendelson Film Productions
