= Abdias do Nascimento =

Brazilian politician (1914–2011)

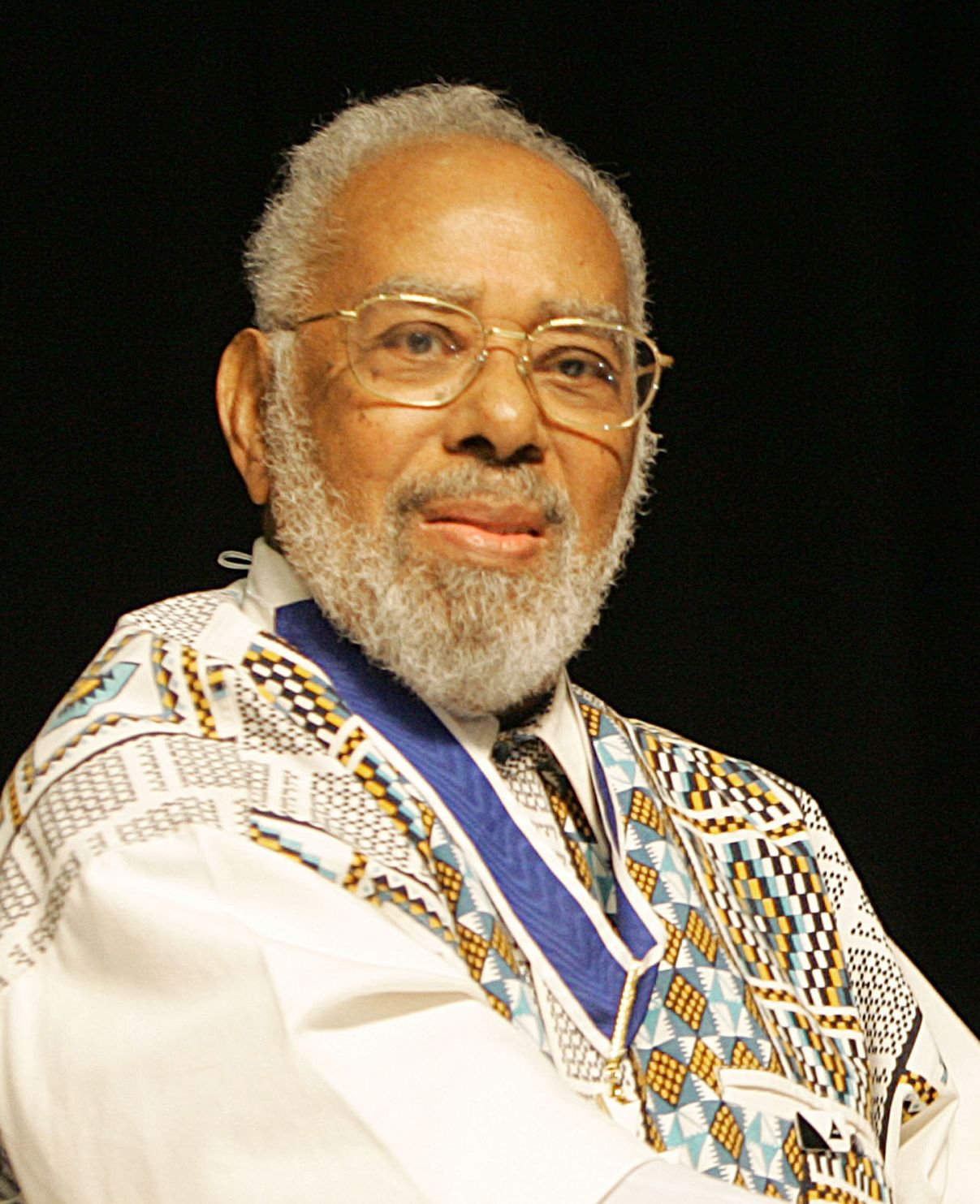
- Abdias do Nascimento in 2006

Senator for Rio de Janeiro
- In office February 25, 1997 – January 31, 1999

Federal Deputy for Rio de Janeiro
- In office March 18, 1983 – January 31, 1987

Personal details
- Born: Abdias do Nascimento; March 14, 1914 Franca, São Paulo, Brazil
- Died: May 23, 2011 (aged 97) Rio de Janeiro, Brazil
- Spouse(s): Léa Garcia (1951–1958); Isabel Barros (circa. 1970 - ?); Elisa (Elizabeth) Larkin Nascimento (1975–2011)
- Occupation: Activist, playwright, writer, journalist, politician, poet, artist, professor
- Awards: Nominated twice for Nobel Peace Prize (1978/2010) UNESCO Toussaint Louverture Prize for Extraordinary Service to the Cause of Combatting Racism and Racial Discrimination (2004) United Nations Award for Relevant Services in Human Rights (2003) UNESCO Prize for Human Rights and Culture of Peace (2001) Getulio Vargas Labor Order of Merit (2009) Brazilian Order of Cultural Merit (2007) Order of Rio Branco, in the degree of Official (2001) and Comendador (2006) Brazil Bar Association Human Rights Prize (2005)
- Writing career
- Notable works: Orishas: The Living Gods of Africa in Brazil (1995); Africans in Brazil: A Pan-African Perspective (1992); Quilombismo (1980); Mixture or Massacre: Essays in the Genocide of a Black People (1979/1989)

Abdias do Nascimento (March 14, 1914 – May 23, 2011) was a prominent African Brazilian scholar, artist, and politician. Also a poet, dramatist, and Pan-African activist, Nascimento created the Black Experimental Theater (1944) and the Black Arts Museum (1950), organized the National Convention of Brazilian Blacks (1946), the First Congress of Brazilian Blacks (1950), and the Third Congress of Black Culture in the Americas (1982). Professor Emeritus, State University of New York at Buffalo, he was the first Afro-Brazilian member of Congress to champion black people's human and civil rights in the National Legislature, where in 1983 he presented the first Brazilian proposals for affirmative action legislation. He served as Rio de Janeiro State Secretary for the Defense and Promotion of Afro-Brazilian People and Secretary of Human Rights and Citizenship. While working as curator of the Black Arts Museum project, he began developing his own creative work (painting), and from 1968 on, he exhibited widely in the U.S., Brazil and abroad. He received national and international honors for his work, including UNESCO's special Toussaint Louverture Award for contribution to the fight against racism, granted to him and to poet Aimé Césaire in 2004. He was officially nominated for the 2010 Nobel Peace Prize.

== Early life ==
Born in Franca, São Paulo state, Nascimento attended public school as a child and joined the military in 1929. In the 1930s Nascimento was a member of the Brazilian Integralist Action, a fascist party. He received a B.A. in Economics from the University of Rio de Janeiro in 1938, and graduate degrees from the Higher Institute of Brazilian Studies (1957) and the Oceanography Institute (1961).

== Black Experimental Theater ==
From 1939 to 1941, Nascimento traveled throughout South America with a group of poets who called themselves the "Santa Hermandad Orquidea", or "Holy Brotherhood of the Orchid." At the Municipal Theater of Lima, Peru, they attended a performance of Eugene O'Neill's play The Emperor Jones with a blackfaced white actor in the leading role. Then and there, he decided to create a black theater in Brazil to fight against racism. In Argentina, Nascimento spent a year with the "Teatro del Pueblo" (People's Theater) in Buenos Aires, where he learned the technical and performance aspects of theater. Returning to São Paulo, he was imprisoned, having been convicted in absentia by the civilian court for the same incident of resisting racial discrimination for which he had been excluded from the Army. While in prison at the Carandiru Penitentiary, he created the Convict's Theater, in which prisoners wrote, directed, and performed in their own plays and musical productions. When released, Nascimento moved to Rio de Janeiro, where he founded the Black Experimental Theater (Teatro Experimental do Negro, TEN) in 1944. TEN premiered on May 8, 1945, with a production of O'Neill's The Emperor Jones, surprising skeptical critics with a presentation that was highly acclaimed for its technical and dramatic effectiveness. With intense activity in theatrical production, TEN also was responsible for stellar initiatives in black activism, such as the National Convention of Brazilian Blacks (1945–46), the Conference of Brazilian Blacks (1949), and the First Congress of Brazilian Blacks (1950). A resolution of the 1950 congress advocated the need for a Black Arts Museum in Brazil, and the Black Experimental Theater embraced the project. Many artists donated works and the first exhibition was held in 1968 at Rio de Janeiro's Museu da Imagem e do Som (Museum of Image and Sound). The Black Experimental Theater organized the cast for the play Orfeu da Conceição, by Vinicius de Moraes, which was later adapted into the motion picture Black Orpheus, directed by Marcel Camus.

== Life in exile ==
Nascimento became a leader in Brazil's black movement, and was forced into exile by the military regime in 1968. From 1968 to 1981 Nascimento was very active in the international Pan-African Movement and was elected vice-president and Coordinator of the Third Congress of Black Culture in the Americas. For the next decade Nascimento was a visiting professor at several universities in the United States, including the Yale School of Drama (1969–1971), and University at Buffalo, The State University of New York, where he founded the chair in African Cultures in the New World, Puerto Rican Studies Program in 1971. He held the position of Professor Emeritus at SUNY-Buffalo. Nascimento also taught at the University of Ife (now Obafemi Awolowo University) in Nigeria.

Nascimento began painting after going into exile as a continuation of his activism through art, blending cultural expression with political resistance and the through restoration of the values of African culture.

== Return to Brazil ==
Nascimento returned to Brazil in 1983 and was elected to the federal Chamber of Deputies as a member of the Democratic Labor Party (PDT). There, his focus was supporting legislation to address racial problems. In 1994 he was elected to the Senate and served until 1999. In 2004 he was nominated for the Nobel Prize for Peace. He received honorary doctorates from the universities of Brasília and Rio de Janeiro, and the Universidade Federal da Bahia. A biography of Nascimento by the journalist Sandra Almada was published in 2009 as part of the Retratos do Brasil Negro series.

Nascimento suffered from diabetes and died on 23 May 2011, in Rio de Janeiro, due to cardiac arrest.

== Selected publications ==
- "Africans in Brazil: a Pan-African perspective" (1997)
- "Orixás: os deuses vivos da Africa" (Orishas: the living gods of Africa in Brazil) (1995)
- "Race and ethnicity in Latin America – African culture in Brazilian art" (1994)
- "Brazil, mixture or massacre? Essays in the genocide of a Black people" (1989)
- "Sortilege" (black mystery) (1978)
- "Racial Democracy in Brazil, Myth or Reality?: A Dossier of Brazilian Racism" (1977)

== Filmography ==
- Cinema de Preto (2005)
- Cinco vezes Favela (1962)
- Terra da Perdição (1962)
- Homem do Sputnik, O (1959)
