= Digital Works =

Studio album by Ahmad Jamal
- Released: 1985
- Recorded: 1985
- Studio: Platinum City Studios, Dallas, Texas
- Genre: Jazz
- Length: 57:10
- Label: Atlantic 781 258-1
- Producer: Ahmad Jamal and James Snyder

Ahmad Jamal chronology
American Classical Music (Ahmad Jamal album) (1982)	Digital Works (1985)	Live at the Montreal Jazz Festival 1985 (1985)

Professional ratings
Review scores
Source	Rating
Allmusic	2.5/5 stars

Digital Works is an album by American jazz pianist Ahmad Jamal featuring performances digitally recorded in 1985 and released on the Atlantic label.

== Critical reception ==
Scott Yanow of Allmusic calls the album, "Good music overall, but not essential." However, Bob Karlovits of The Pittsburgh Press wrote positively of the album upon its release: "Jamal is one of those few musicians who can take a shopworn tune and find an element that no one else has," adding "in his hands, these songs sparkle," and calling Digital Works "top notch in all ways."

== Track listing ==
1. "Poinciana" (Buddy Bernier, Nat Simon) – 8:26
2. "But Not for Me" (George Gershwin, Ira Gershwin) – 3:33
3. "Midnight Sun" (Sonny Burke, Lionel Hampton, Johnny Mercer) – 3:20
4. "Footprints" (Wayne Shorter) – 5:13
5. "Once Upon a Time" (Lee Adams, Charles Strouse) – 3:17
6. "One" (Sigidi Abdullah) – 7:16
7. "La Costa" (Natalie Cole, Linda Williams) – 5:22
8. "Misty" (Johnny Burke, Erroll Garner) – 3:58
9. "Theme From M*A*S*H" (Mike Altman, Johnny Mandel) – 6:30
10. "Biencavo" (Ahmad Jamal) – 4:27
11. "Time for Love" (Johnny Mandel, Paul Francis Webster) – 6:39
12. "Wave" (Antônio Carlos Jobim) – 5:22

== Personnel ==
- Ahmad Jamal – piano
- Larry Ball – bass guitar
- Herlin Riley – drums
- Iraj Lashkary – percussion
