= Lourdes de Oliveira =

Brazilian actress

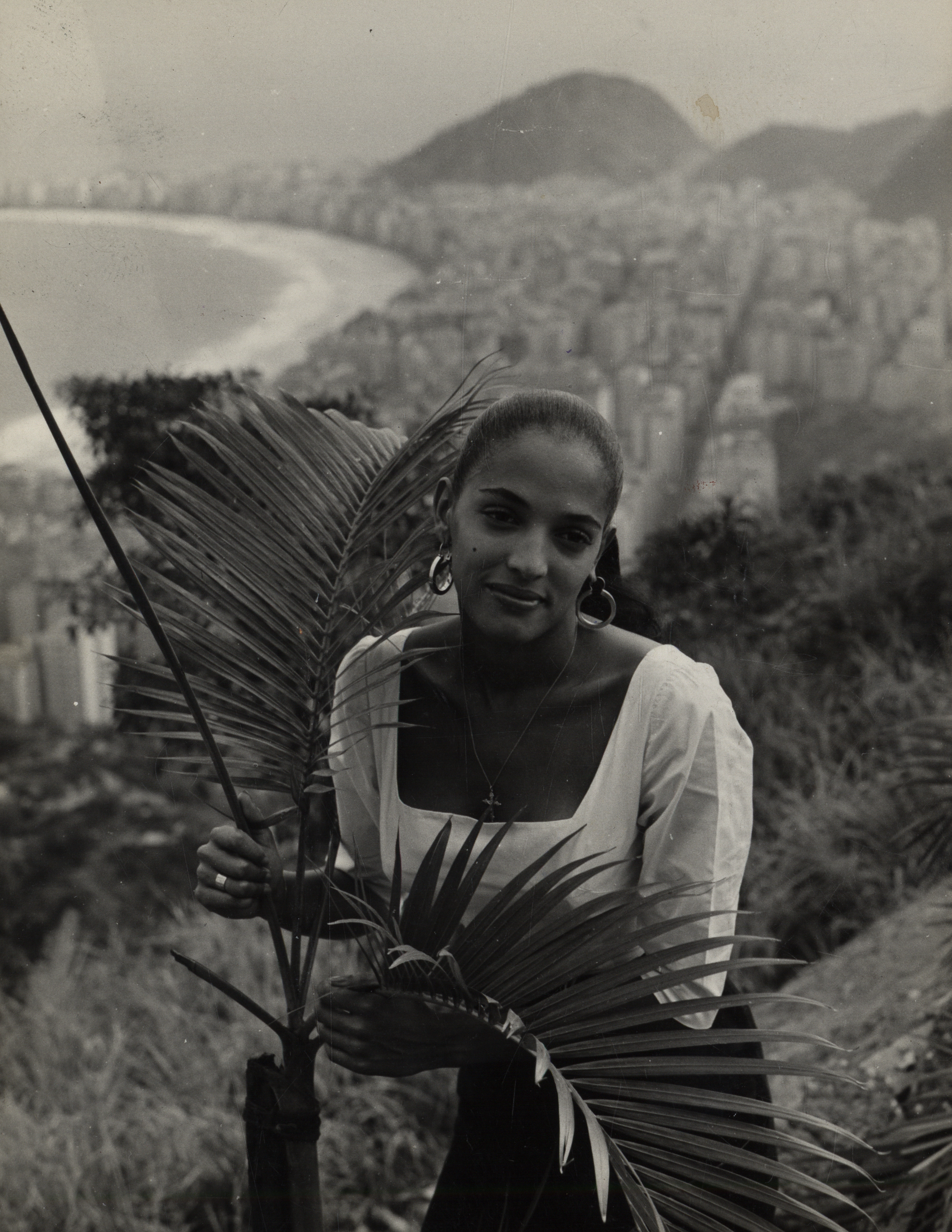
- De Oliveira in 1960.
- Born: December 17, 1938 (age 86); Rio de Janeiro, Rio de Janeiro; Brazil
- Occupation: Actress
- Years active: 1959–1960
- Spouse: Marcel Camus (m. 1959; died 1982)
- Children: 2

Lourdes de Oliveira (born 17 December 1938) is a Brazilian actress. She is known for her supporting role as Mira in the 1959 romantic tragedy Black Orpheus and her starring role in the 1960 adventure film Os Bandeirantes. De Oliveira married the French director Marcel Camus, whom she met while filming, and retired from acting.

== Early life ==
Lourdes de Oliveira was born on 17 December 1938 in Rio de Janeiro. She is the daughter of the composer and tambourine player Darcy de Oliveira. An athlete and Flamenguista (supporter of CR Flamengo) in her youth, she competed in races and participated in the Rio Spring Games.

== Adult life ==
She acted in two films. In 1959, while a student, she was invited to act in French director Marcel Camus' romantic tragedy Black Orpheus. She played Mira, the supporting female role. In 1960, she was a lead in Camus' adventure film Os Bandeirantes as the character Suzana.

De Oliveira married Camus, whom she met in 1959 while filming Black Orpheus. After her second film, she retired from acting and moved to France with her husband. She and Camus have two children including the writer Jean-Christophe Camus, who was born in Paris in 1962.

== Filmography ==
Year	Title	Role
1959	Black Orpheus	Mira
1960	Os Bandeirantes	Suzana
