= Champions Juniors =

- Directed by: Pierre Blondy
- Written by: Roger Cauvin; Pierre Blondy; Marcel Camus
- Starring: Louis de Funès
- Music by: Joseph Kosma
- Release date: 1951
- Running time: 22 min.
- Country: France
- Language: French

Champions Juniors, is a French comedy film from 1951, directed by Pierre Blondy, written by Roger Cauvin, starring Louis de Funès. It is a short film.

== Cast ==
- Jean Daurand
- Louis de Funès
