= Intervals (Ahmad Jamal album) =

Studio album by Ahmad Jamal
- Released: 1980
- Recorded: 1980
- Studio: Sierra Pacific, Los Angeles
- Genre: Jazz
- Length: 35:16
- Label: 20th Century Fox T-622
- Producer: Bones Howe, Paul Gayten and Ahmad Jamal

Ahmad Jamal chronology
One (1978)	Intervals (1980)	Night Song (1980)

Intervals is an album by American jazz pianist Ahmad Jamal featuring performances recorded in 1980 and released on the 20th Century Fox label.

== Critical reception ==
Professional ratings
Review scores
Source	Rating
AllMusic	1.5/5 stars
The Rolling Stone Jazz Record Guide	2/5 stars

AllMusic awarded the album 1½ stars, stating, "This very forgettable LP features Jamal on both electric and acoustic piano, saddled by rather commercial arrangements".

== Track listing ==
All compositions by Ahmad Jamal except as indicated

1. "You're Welcome, Stop On By" (Bobby Womack, Truman Thomas) – 5:51
2. "Jordie" – 3:52
3. "So In Love" (Cole Porter) – 3:40
4. "Reggae" – 3:48
5. "Boatride" – 5:17
6. "Excerpt from My One and Only Love" (Guy Wood, Robert Mellin) – 2:10
7. "The Tube" – 4:15
8. "Bones" – 6:23

== Personnel ==
- Ahmad Jamal – piano
- John Heard – bass
- Harvey Mason – drums
- Calvin Keys – guitar
- Selden Newton – percussion
