= Marcel Camus =

French film director (1912–1982)

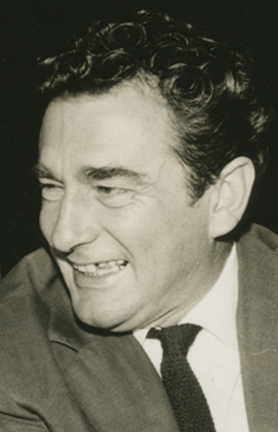
- Born: 21 April 1912; Chappes, France
- Died: 13 January 1982 (aged 69); Paris, France
- Resting place: Père Lachaise Cemetery
- Occupation: Film director
- Years active: 1957–1982
- Spouse(s): Marpessa Dawn (divorced); Lourdes de Oliveira
- Children: 2

Marcel Camus (21 April 1912 – 13 January 1982) was a French film director. He is best known for Orfeu Negro (Black Orpheus), which won the Palme d'Or at the 1959 Cannes Film Festival and the 1960 Oscar for Best Foreign Language Film.

== Biography ==
Camus was born in Chappes, in the Ardennes département of France. He studied art and intended to become an art teacher. However, World War II interrupted his plans. He spent part of the war in a German prisoner-of-war camp.

On his return from captivity, his uncle, famous novelist Roland Dorgelès, introduced him to several filmmakers. Camus assisted filmmakers in France, including Jacques Feyder, Luis Buñuel, and Jacques Becker.

=== New Wave ===
In a famous photo of the French New Wave filmmakers, taken on the steps of the Palais des Festivals in Cannes in 1959, Marcel Camus appears alongside François Truffaut, François Reichenbach, Claude Chabrol, Jacques Doniol-Valcroze, Jean-Luc Godard, Roger Vadim, Jean-Daniel Pollet, Jacques Rozier, Jacques Baratier, Jean Valère, Édouard Molinaro and Robert Hossein.

=== Orfeu Negro ===
In 1958, at the suggestion of producer Sacha Gordine, Camus travelled to Brazil to adapt a play for the screen with the help of Jacques Viot. Orfeu da Conceição, by famous poet and diplomat Vinícius de Moraes, became Orfeu Negro, a transposition of the love story of Orpheus and Eurydice to the favelas of Rio de Janeiro during Carnival. The film won over the general public and a large proportion of the critics. It was a worldwide success, winning several awards including the Palme d'Or at the 1959 Cannes Film Festival and the Academy Award for Best International Feature Film in 1960. It introduced Europeans and Americans to Rio, Carnival and bossa nova, with unknown black actors and a tender view of Brazil.

=== Os bandeirantes ===
In 1960, Camus made a second Brazilian-themed film, Os Bandeirantes. This adventure film follows a French diamond miner in Brazil who, after being betrayed and left for dead by a friend, embarks on a quest for vengeance but finds himself falling in love with a Brazilian woman along the way.

=== Last films ===
Camus had a great success with a World War II comedy, Atlantic Wall, starring the well-known French comedian Bourvil. It was the second most popular film in France in 1970, attracting 4,770,962 viewers.

In 1976, Camus came back to the country that fascinated him and his wife. In a return to Brazilian themes, he directed Bahia (also known as Otalia da Bahia and Os pastores da noite), adapted from Brazilian writer Jorge Amado's Os pastores da noite (Shepherds of the Night). However, Bahia failed to recapture the success of Orfeu Negro.

Camus ended his career working primarily in television.

== Personal life ==
Camus married Marpessa Dawn, who starred in Orfeu Negro, but they divorced shortly thereafter. He then married Lourdes de Oliveira, who was also in the film. Camus and de Oliveira had two children, including writer Jean-Christophe Camus.

Camus died in Paris on January 13, 1982 following open heart surgery. He was buried in Père Lachaise Cemetery.

== Filmography ==
Year	Original title	English title	Role	Notes
1951	Champions Juniors		Writer	Short film; directed by Pierre Cauvin
1957	Mort en fraude	Fugitive in Saigon	Director	
1959	Orfeu Negro	Black Orpheus	Director	
1960	Os Bandeirantes	The Pioneers	Director, writer	
1962	L'Oiseau de paradis	Bird of Paradise	Director, co-writer with Jacques Viot	
1965	Le Chant du monde	The Song of the World	Director	
1967	Vivre la Nuit	Love in the Night	Director	
1970	Un Été Sauvage		Director	
1970	Le Mur de l'Atlantique	Atlantic Wall	Director	
1973	The Bread Peddler		Director	Miniseries
1976	Otalia de Bahia	Bahia	Director, writer	
1979	Le Roi qui vient du sud		Co-director with Heinz Schirk	Miniseries
1980	Mein Freund Winnetou	My Friend Winnetou	Director	Miniseries
