= Agostinho dos Santos =

Brazilian singer and composer (1932–1973)

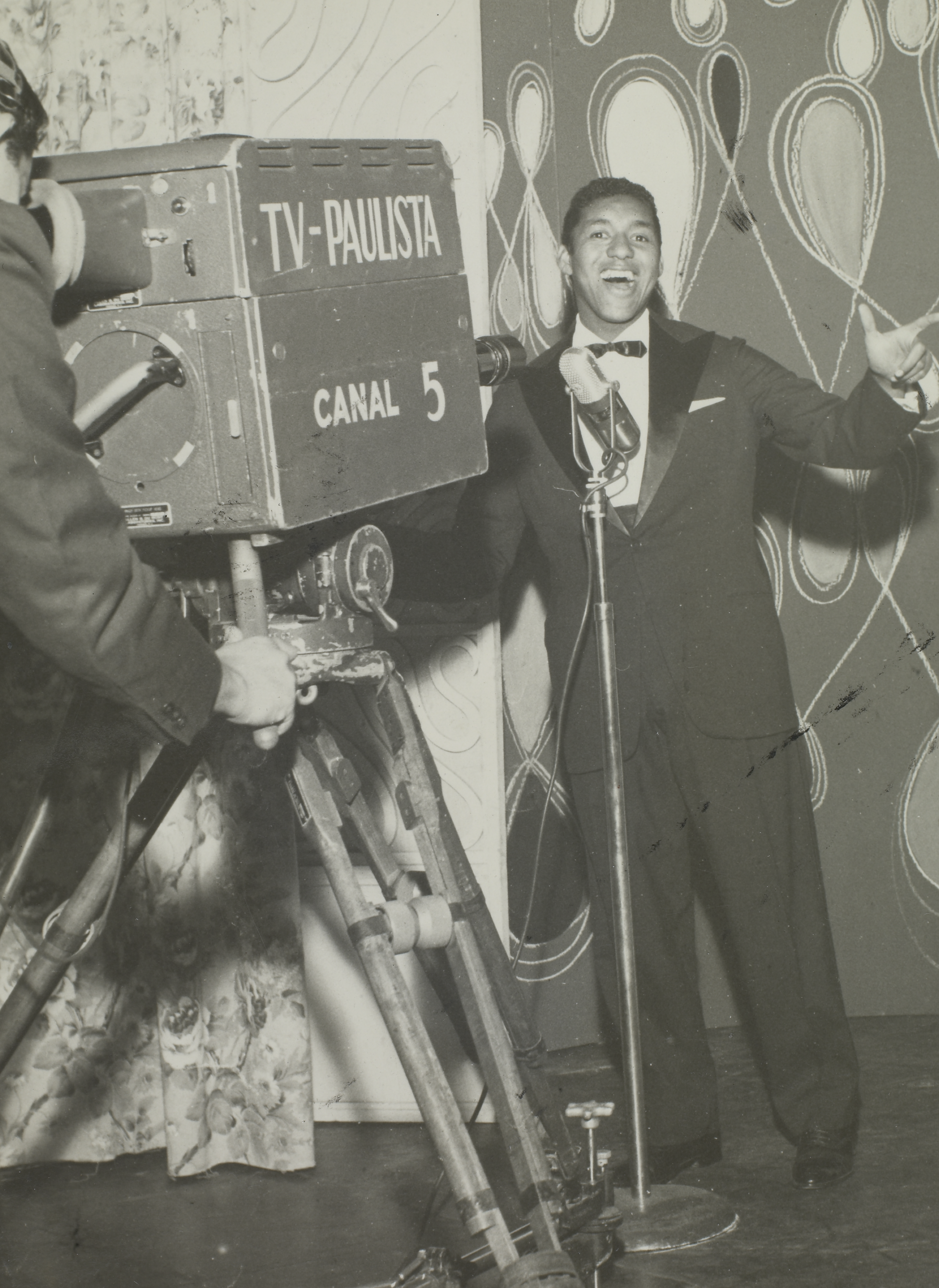
- Agostinho dos Santos (1956)

Background information
- Born: Agostinho dos Santos; April 25, 1932; São Paulo, Brazil
- Died: July 11, 1973 (aged 41) Orly, France
- Genres: Bossa nova, MPB, rock and roll
- Occupations: Singer, songwriter
- Years active: 1951–73
- Labels: Star Records (Brazil), Polydor, RGE, Elenco, Ritmos Codil, Premier, London Records/Odeon Records, Continental Records, Phonogram Records/Polyfar, SBA, Copacabana

Agostinho dos Santos (April 25, 1932 – July 11, 1973) was a Brazilian singer and composer of bossa nova, MPB and rock and roll, active from the early 1950s until his premature death in the crash of Varig Flight 820 in 1973, at the age of 41.

Dos Santos is best known today for lending his voice to the soundtrack of the classic 1959 film Orfeu Negro. He is also credited with playing a role in the development of the careers of other important Bossa Nova artists, such as João Gilberto and Milton Nascimento. Dos Santos' voice was a baritone with bright coloring and a light vibrato, singing in a style called (in Portuguese) "crooner da orchestra".

== Career ==
Agostinho dos Santos was born in São Paulo, in the neighborhood called Bela Vista or Bixiga. One of his first jobs in music was singing at a taxi-dancing club called O maravilhoso in São Paulo. Early in his career, Dos Santos sang with the orchestra of Osmar Milani, and on a lunchtime radio program hosted by Manuel de Nóbrega on Radio Nacional. Dos Santos' first recordings were successes. The first, Vendedor de laranjas (Orange Seller) became widely popular in Brazil, while his second major hit, Meu benzinho was a Portuguese version of the song "My Little One" recorded in English by Frankie Laine. Also during this period Dos Santos successfully recorded a Portuguese version of the Bill Haley hit "See You Later Alligator", "Até Logo, Jacaré." During 1959, Dos Santos frequently appeared on a music program featuring Tom Jobim, called O bom Tom, broadcast on TV Paulista in São Paulo.

Dos Santos provided his voice to an important film of the Bossa Nova era, Orfeu Negro (Black Orpheus) (1959), dubbing the songs sung by the lead character in the film (Orpheu), played by Breno Mello. Dos Santos was selected to dub the part in preference to João Gilberto, who also auditioned for the part, because the producers felt Dos Santos' voice sounded more black (Dos Santos was in fact black, and Gilberto was white). As a result of his work in the film, Dos Santos received offers to appear in music clubs, theaters, and on television worldwide.

Dos Santos was a participant in the historic 1962 concert Bossa Nova at Carnegie Hall, in which he enjoyed great success with the audience. A review in The New York Times cited Dos Santos' performance particularly, stating that his voice was the most beautiful voice of the decade. In 1963, he traveled with Jose Scatena, president of the RGE record label, on a visit that inaugurated the release of RGE offerings through the Argentinian record company Fermata. By 1964, Dos Santos was one of the highest paid television performers in Brazil. In 1971, he participated in the first Onda Nueva music festival in Venezuela.

During his career, Dos Santos toured through the U.S., Italy, Germany, Portugal, Chile, Uruguay, Argentina, Venezuela, and Mexico. He performed in the U.S. and in Brazil with Johnny Mathis, and, in Italy, with Caterina Valente. Dos Santos appeared on TV in France, Portugal, England, and Belgium. His compositions include "Forças Ocultas" (with Antônio Bruno), "Sozinho Com Você" (with Dirce Morais/Heitor Canilo), "Chuva Para Molhar O Sol" (with Edison Borges), "Podem Falar" (with Renato Duarte), "Distância é Saudade," and "Quem Levou Maria."

== Influence on Brazilian popular music ==
Bossa Nova historian Walter Silva states that it was Dos Santos who introduced João Gilberto to the rhythmic innovations of Johnny Alf (Alfredo José da Silva), considered to be the father of Bossa Nova. Gilberto would go on to build an illustrious career on this stylistic foundation. In their history of Brazilian popular music, Chris McGowan and Ricardo Pessanha credit Dos Santos with submitting the work of Milton Nascimento to the 1967 Second Festival Internacional de Canção (FIC) (International Song Festival), resulting in Nascimento's work being accepted to the festival and triggering further growth in Nascimento's career. Dos Santos was also artistic director of the LP album of performances at the festival, which was issued by the Brazilian record company Codil.

== Personal life and death ==
Dos Santos had three children. Dos Santos played soccer (futebol) for a team from his neighborhood in São Paulo called Boca Junior, and also for on a team composed of fellow musicians.

Dos Santos was a passenger on Varig Flight 820, traveling from Galeão Airport, Rio de Janeiro, Brazil, to Orly Airport, Paris, France, on July 11, 1973, when a fire on board the airplane caused it to make an emergency landing in a field not far from the airport. Dos Santos was among the 123 fatalities.

== Discography ==
During his career, Agostinho recorded for a variety of labels, including Polydor, RGE, Odeon, Continental, and Sinter.

- "Rasga teu verso" (1953), Star 78
- "O vendedor de laranjas"/"A última vez que vi Paris" (1955), Polydor 78
- "Meu benzinho"/"Falam meus olhos" (1956), Polydor 78
- "Pula-pula"/"Vai sofrendo" (1956), Polydor 78
- "Canção do mar"/"Pif-paf" (1956), Polydor 78
- "Vagabundo e sonhador"/"Até logo, Jacaré" (1956), Polydor 78
- "As três Marias"/"Minha oração" (1957), Polydor 78
- "Doce mãezinha"/"Homenagem à minha mãe" (1957), Polydor 78
- "Chove lá fora"/"Triste a recordar" (1957), Polydor 78
- "Só você"/Maria dos meus pecados" (1957), Polydor 78
- "Maria Shangay"/"A saudade" (1957), Polydor 78
- "Concerto de outono"/"Esquecimento" (1957), polydor 78
- Uma voz e seus sucessos (1957), Polydor LP
- "Por causa de você"/"Tudo ou nada" (1958), Polydor 78
- "Estrada do sol"/"Do-ré-mi" (1958), Polydor 78
- "Sucedeu assim"/"Graças a Deus" (1958), Polydor 78
- "Crepúsculo"/"Segredo" (1958), Polydor 78
- "Deixe que eu possa esquecer"/"Se todos fossem iguais a você" (1958), Polydor285 78
- "Eu não existo sem você"/"Foi a noite" (1958), Polydor 78
- "Meu castigo"/"Doi muito mais a dor" (1958), RGE 78
- "Chega de Saudade"/"Balada triste" (1958), RGE 78
- Agostinho Espetacular (1958), RGE LP
- Antonio Carlos Jobim e Fernando Cesar na voz de Agostinho dos Santos (1958), Polydor LP
- Agostinho dos Santos (1959), Polydor 33/10 pol.
- "Ravina"/"Sem cessar" (1959), RGE 78
- "Canção de amor"/"A felicidade" (1959), RGE 78
- "Manhã de carnaval"/"A felicidade" (1959), RGE 78
- "Balada do homem sem Deus"/"Sede de amor" (1959), RGE 78
- O inimitável Agostinho dos Santos (1959), RGE LP
- "Cantiga de quem está só"/"Natureza morta" (1960), RGE 78
- "Leva-me contigo"/"Saudade querida" (1960), RGE 78
- "Muljer passarinho"/"Chuva para molhar o sol" (1960), 10255
- "Noite feliz"/"Verbo amar" (1960), RGE 78
- Agostinho, sempre Agostinho (1960), RGE LP
- "Nossos momentos"/"Distância é saudade" (1961), RGE 78
- "És meu amor"/"Ave amor" (1961), RGE 78
- Agostinho canta sucessos (1961), RGE LP
- "Graças"/"Eu e tu" (1962), RGE 78
- "Suave é a noite"/"Aqueles olhos verdes" (1962), RGE 78
- A presença de Agostinho (1962), RGE LP
- Os grandes sucessos de Agostinho (1962), RGE 5136
- "Noche de luna"/"Recuerdos de ti" (1963), RGE 78
- "Samba em prelúdio" (1963), RGE 78
- "Noite de lua"/"Amor" (1963), RGE 78
- Vanguarda (1963), RGE LP
- Agostinho dos Santos (1966), Elenco LP
- Música nossa (1967), Ritmos Codil LP
- Os grandes sucessos de Agostinho dos Santos (1967), Premier LP
- Agostinho dos Santos (1970), London/Odeon LP
- Agostinho dos Santos (1973), Continental LP
- Agostinho dos Santos (1974), Phonogram/Polyfar LP
- Agostinho dos Santos (1977), RGE LP
- Agostinho dos Santos (Edição Histórica) – Vol. 5, Série Medium [S/D], Polydor LP
- As melhores interpretações de Agostinho dos Santos [ant. 1980], SBA LP
- Os mais lindos boleros (1978), LP
- Série convite para ouvir (1993), LP
- A voz incomparável de Agostinho dos Santos (1997), Copacabana CD

== Filmography ==
Dos Santos appeared on screen in at least one film, called Operação dinamite (Operation Dynamite). In that film, produced in Portugal in 1967, dos Santos appeared as himself.
