= Léa Garcia =

Brazilian actress (1933–2023)

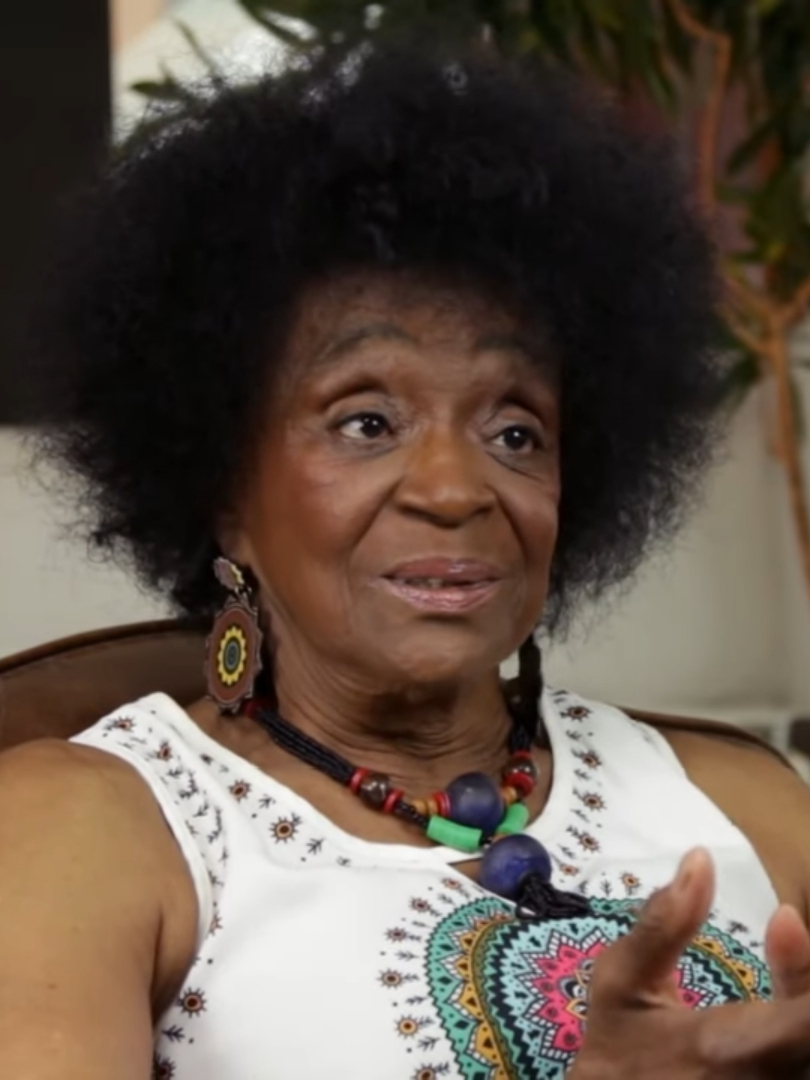
- Léa Garcia in 2019
- Born: Léa Lucas Garcia de Aguiar; 11 March 1933; Rio de Janeiro, Brazil
- Died: 15 August 2023 (aged 90); Gramado, Rio Grande do Sul, Brazil
- Occupation: Actress
- Years active: 1950–2023

Léa Lucas Garcia de Aguiar (11 March 1933 – 15 August 2023) was a Brazilian actress. She was known for her numerous television and film roles. Her breakout role was in the 1959 Oscar-winning Black Orpheus, in which she portrayed Serafina, Eurydice's cousin.

Garcia died of heart complications on 15 August 2023, at the age of 90.

In 2026, Léa Garcia was the plot of the parade of Mocidade Alegre samba school in the Anhembi Sambadrome. Mocidade Alegre won the Carnival of São Paulo championship with this homage to Garcia.

== Television roles ==
- 2022 IndependênciaS - Mãe de Osória
- 2020 Arcanjo Renegado - Dona Laura
- 2018 Carcereiros - Clotilde
- 2018 Sob Pressão - Dona Leda
- 2018 Assédio - Conceição Duarte da Silva
- 2017 Mister Brau - Dona Antônia
- 2017 Sol Nascente - Luzia
- 2016 Êta Mundo Bom! - Parteira de Candinho
- 2009 A Lei e o Crime - Clara
- 2007 Luz do Sol - Edite (Babá)
- 2006 Cidadão Brasileiro - Dadá
- 2001 O Clone - Lola da Silva
- 1999 Você Decide
- 1999 Suave Veneno - Selma
- 1997 Anjo Mau - Cida
- 1996 Você Decide
- 1996 Xica da Silva - Bastiana
- 1996 O Campeão
- 1995 Tocaia Grande
- 1994 A Viagem - Natália
- 1993 Agosto - Sebastiana
- 1990 Araponga - Mundica
- 1990 Desejo - Mariana
- 1989 Pacto de Sangue - Rute
- 1988 Abolição
- 1987 Helena - Chica
- 1986 Dona Beija - Flaviana
- 1983 Bandidos da Falange - Gladys
- 1980 Marina - Leila
- 1978 Maria, Maria - Rita
- 1976 Escrava Isaura - Rosa
- 1975 A Moreninha - Duda
- 1974 Fogo sobre Terra - Lana
- 1974 Feliz na Ilusão (Caso Especial)
- 1973 Os Ossos do Barão
- 1972 Selva de Pedra - Elza
- 1972 Meu Primeiro Baile (Caso Especial)
- 1971 O Homem Que Deve Morrer - Luana
- 1971 Minha Doce Namorada
- 1969 Acorrentados - Irmã Serafina

== Film roles ==
- 2024 BELA LX-404 - BELA LX-404
- 2006 Memórias da Chibata - Avó de Juca
- 2006 Nzinga - Mãe de santo
- 2006 Mulheres do Brasil - Eunice
- 2006 The Greatest Love of All - Zezé
- 2005 Filhas do Vento (Daughters of the Wind) - Jú
- 2003 Viva Sapato!
- 1999 Orfeu - Mãe de Maicol
- 1998 Cruz e Sousa - O Poeta do Desterro - Carolina
- 1984 Quilombo
- 1978 Black Goddess - Yemoja
- 1978 A Noiva da Cidade
- 1977 Ladrões de Cinema
- 1976 Feminino Plural
- 1974 O Forte - Damiana
- 1969 Compasso de Espera - Zefa
- 1964 Santo Módico
- 1963 Ganga Zumba - Cipriana
- 1960 Os Bandeirantes - Herminia
- 1959 Black Orpheus - Serafina
