= A felicidade =

Song from the 1959 film Black Orpheus

"A felicidade" ("Happiness") is a bossa nova song by Antônio Carlos Jobim, with lyrics by Vinícius de Moraes, composed in 1958 for the French film Orfeu Negro (Black Orpheus).

== Background ==
The theme of the song is the fragility of happiness. The lyrics begin: "Tristeza não tem fim. Felicidade sim" ("Sadness has no ending. Happiness does"). The lyrics compare happiness to a drop of dew, a feather floating in the wind, and the poor escaping their reality in the fantasies of Carnaval, emphasizing the transitory nature of each. The final stanzas reference the "namorada" (girlfriend/sweetheart) of the character singing the song, without touching directly on the theme of impermanence and loss. In the context of the film, however, these stanzas describe Orfeu's search for Euridice after her death ("É como esta noite, passando, passando, em busca da madrugada..." ("It's like tonight, passing, passing, in search of dawn...").

Jobim and Vinícius collaborated on several songs for the 1956 stage play, Orfeu da Conceição, but French producer Sacha Gordine wanted new material for the film version. According to author Ruy Castro, "The duo wrote three songs, mostly over the telephone, given that Vinicíus was now working for the Itamaraty in Montevideo: 'A felicidade,' 'Frevo,' and 'O nosso amor.'" Agostinho dos Santos sings "A felicidade" during the opening credits of the movie, accompanied by Roberto Menescal on guitar.

The film won the Palme d'Or at the 1959 Cannes Film Festival and the 1960 Academy Award for Best Foreign Language Film, bringing worldwide attention to Jobim, Moraes, and the bossa nova movement.

A French version of the song, with lyrics by André Salvet, is known as "Adieu tristesse", and an Italian version, with lyrics by Mario Panzeri, is entitled "Felicità".

== Recorded versions ==
- João Gilberto – "A felicidade" 'Desafinado' 2015
- João Gilberto – A felicidade/O nosso amor [78rpm, Odeon, 14.491] (1959) and Live in Montreux (1987)
- Sylvia Telles – Amor de gente moça (Musicas de Antonio Carlos Jobim) (1959)
- Neil Sedaka – Circulate (1960)
- Radames Gnattali – Radamés Gnattali Sexteto – Radamés na Europa com seu Sexteto e Edu (1960)
- Sonia y Myriam – En La Habana (recorded as Samba de Orfeo) (1960)
- Bob Brookmeyer – Trombone Jazz Samba (1962)
- Willie Bobo – Bobo's Beat (1963)
- Billy Eckstine – Now Singing in 12 Great Movies (1963)
- Charlie Byrd – Byrd Song (1964) and More Brazilian Byrd (1967)
- Vince Guaraldi Trio – Jazz Impressions of Black Orpheus (rec. 1964, released 2010 on remastered version)
- Antônio Carlos Jobim – The Wonderful World of Antonio Carlos Jobim (1965) and Inédito (1987)
- The Ramsey Lewis Trio – The In Crowd (1965)
- Astrud Gilberto – Look to the Rainbow (1966)
- Hugh Masekela – The Emancipation of Hugh Masekela (1966)
- Claudine Longet – Claudine (1967)
- Bola Sete – Bola Sete at the Monterey Jazz Festival (1967)
- Tito Madi – Balanço Zona Sul (1968)
- Cal Tjader – Solar Heat (1968)
- Vinicius de Moraes – En La Fusa con Maria Creuza y Toquinho (1970)
- Milton Nascimento – Milton (1970)
- Kenny Drew Trio – Dark Beauty (rec. 1974, released 1991 on reissued version)
- Niels-Henning Ørsted Pedersen – Jaywalkin' (1975)
- Tom Zé – Estudando o Samba (1976)
- Orlandivo – Orlandivo (1977)
- אושר - מתי כספי , מתוך "ארץ טרופית יפה" (1977)
- Ella Fitzgerald – Ella Abraça Jobim (1981)
- Nara Leão – Garota de Ipanema (1985)
- Rosa Passos – Curare (1991)
- George Cables – Skylark (1995)
- Joe Henderson – Double Rainbow: The Music of Antonio Carlos Jobim (1995)
- Lee Konitz – Brazilian Rhapsody (1995)
- Eliane Elias – Eliane Elias Sings Jobim (1998)
- Gal Costa – Gal Costa canta Tom Jobim ao vivo (1999)
- Quarteto Jobim-Morelenbaum – Quarteto Jobim-Morelenbaum (2000)
- Dori Caymmi – Influências (2001)
- Vinicius Cantuária – Silva (2005)
- Jeff Hamilton – From Studio 4, Cologne, Germany (2006)
- Quarteto em Cy – "Vinicius em Cy" (1993)

== See also ==
- List of Brazilian songs
