= American Classical Music (Ahmad Jamal album) =

Live album by Ahmad Jamal
- Released: 1982, 1984
- Recorded: 1982
- Venue: The Great American Music Hall
- Genre: Jazz
- Labels: Shubra Productions, Black Lion Records
- Producer: Don Cody

Ahmad Jamal chronology
Live at Bubba's (1981)	American Classical Music (1982)	Digital Works (1985)

American Classical Music is a live album by American jazz pianist Ahmad Jamal. In 1984, it was re-released as Goodbye Mr. Evans.

It was recorded at San Francisco's Great American Music Hall in July 1982 and released by Shubra Productions later that year.

In 1984, Black Lion Records released the album, everywhere but in the USA, as Goodbye Mr. Evans. The name refers to the ballad of the same title written by saxophonist Phil Woods to honor the jazz pianist Bill Evans, who had died in 1980.

== Track listing ==
1. "Lament for a Dying Boy" (Admad Jamal) 4:45
2. "Somewhere Along the Nile" (Richard Evans, Ra Twani Az Yemeni) 5:24
3. "Close Enough for Love" (Johnny Mandel, Paul Williams) 4:34
4. "Firefly" (Cy Coleman, Carolyn Leigh) 7:14
5. "Mellowdrama" (Jamal) 7:28
6. "Goodbye Mr. Evans" (Phil Woods) 5:12
7. "Polka Dots and Moonbeams" (Jimmy Van Heusen, Johnny Burke) 3:53
8. "Bluesette" (Toots Thielemans) 3:41

== Personnel ==
- Ahmad Jamal – piano
- Sabu Adeyola - double bass
- Payton Crossley - drums
- Selden Newton - percussion
