= Night Song (Ahmad Jamal album) =

Studio album by Ahmad Jamal
- Released: 1980
- Recorded: October 7, 1980; Hollywood, California
- Genre: Jazz
- Length: 40:22
- Label: Motown M7-945R1
- Producer: Lee Young Sr.

Ahmad Jamal chronology
Intervals (1980)	Night Song (1980)	Live at Bubba's (1981)

Professional ratings
Review scores
Source	Rating
Allmusic	2/5 stars

Night Song is an album by American jazz pianist Ahmad Jamal featuring performances recorded in 1980 and released on the Motown label.

== Track listing ==
1. "When You Wish Upon a Star" (Leigh Harline, Ned Washington) – 4:51
2. "Deja Vu" (Isaac Hayes, Adrienne Anderson) – 5:02
3. "Need to Smile" (Sonelius Smith) – 5:29
4. "Bad Times" (Gerard McMahon) – 4:30
5. "Touch Me in the Morning" (Michael Masser, Ron Miller) – 4:48
6. "Night Song" (Lee Adams, Charles Strouse) – 6:56
7. "Theme From M*A*S*H" (Mike Altman, Johnny Mandel) – 4:43
8. "Something's Missing in My Life" (Paul Jabara, Jay Asher) – 4:03

== Personnel ==
- Ahmad Jamal, Dean Paul Gant, Gil Askey – keyboards
- Oscar Brashear, Robert O’Bryant – trumpet
- Maurice Spears, Garnett Brown – trombone
- Pete Christlieb – alto saxophone
- Ernie Fields – baritone saxophone
- Calvin Keys, Greg Purce – guitar
- John Heard, Kenneth Burke – double bass
- Chester Thompson – drums
