= Marpessa Dawn =

American-French actress (1934–2008)

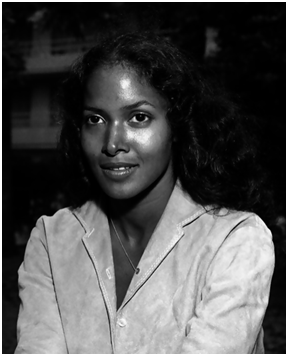
- Dawn in 1959
- Born: January 3, 1934; Pittsburgh, Pennsylvania, U.S.
- Died: August 25, 2008 (aged 74); Paris, France
- Other name: Gypsy Marpessa Dawn Menor
- Occupations: Actress, singer, dancer
- Years active: 1955–1995
- Spouse(s): Marcel Camus (divorced); Georges-Eric Vander-Elst

Marpessa Dawn (January 3, 1934 – August 25, 2008), also known as Gypsy Marpessa Dawn Menor, was an American-French actress, as well as a singer and dancer. She is best remembered for her role in the film Black Orpheus (1959) by Marcel Camus.

== Biography ==
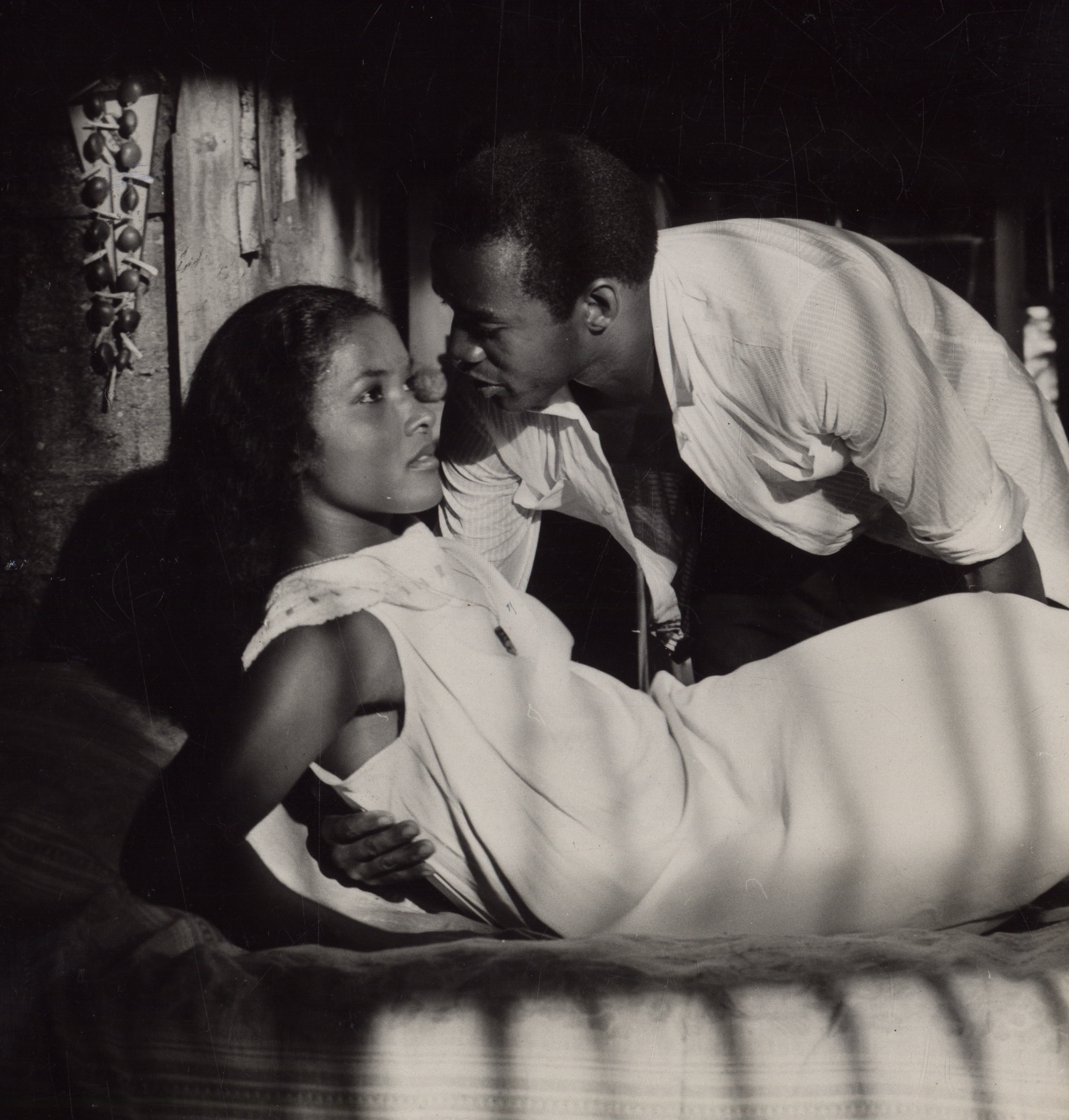
Dawn and Breno Mello in Black Orpheus (1959) (Brazilian National Archives).

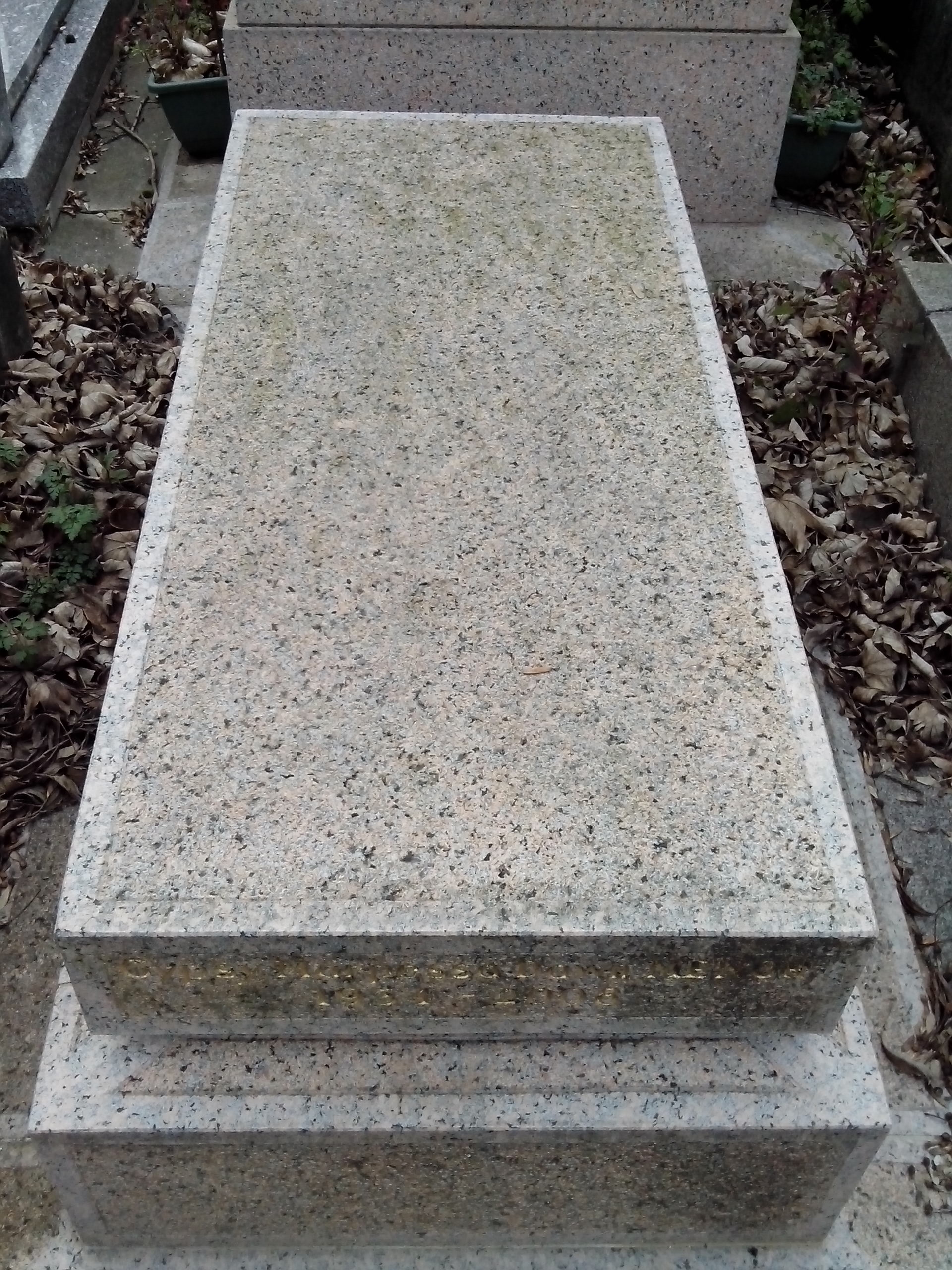
The tomb of Marpessa Dawn in Père Lachaise Cemetery

Born on a farm near Pittsburgh, Pennsylvania, of African-American and Filipino heritage, she worked as a laboratory technician in New York before migrating to Europe as a teenager.

She began acting in England, with some minor TV roles. Then, in 1953, she relocated to France and while occasionally working as a governess also sang and danced in nightclubs, where she met director Marcel Camus. At the age of 24, she won the role of "Eurydice" in his film Black Orpheus. The film won the Palme d'Or at the 1959 Cannes Film Festival and the 1960 Academy Award for Best Foreign Language Film. She married Camus, but divorced him soon after and married Belgian actor Georges-Eric Vander-Elst, whom she met when they appeared together in a play at the American Center in Paris. They had a civil ceremony held in secrecy. Considered a great beauty, she was featured in November 1959 by Ebony and has been hailed as "one of Ebony magazine's prettiest cover girls", along with the likes of Dorothy Dandridge, Halle Berry and Lena Horne".

Dawn remained in Europe, working in French films and television. She also had several theatrical parts, including a starring role in Chérie Noire, a highly successful stage comedy which played for seven years, touring France, Belgium, Switzerland, Tunisia, Algeria and Morocco, and Le Jardin des délices (The Garden of Delights), by Fernando Arrabal, with Delphine Seyrig (1969). Her subsequent career, however, was much less successful. She appeared in a 2005 documentary about Vinicius de Moraes, who wrote the original play from which Black Orpheus was adapted.

She and her fellow lead from that film, Brazilian actor Breno Mello, died just 42 days apart in 2008, both from heart attacks. They both starred in the 1959 film Black Orpheus. She was 74 years old at the time of her death in Paris and left five children and four grandchildren.

== Filmography ==
Year	Title	Role	Notes
1957	Élisa	La négresse	
1958	The Woman Eater	Native Sacrifice Girl	
1959	Black Orpheus	Eurydice	
1961	El secreto de los hombres azules	Malika	
1963	Canzoni nel mondo	Herself	
1966	Au théâtre ce soir	French theater	Episode: "Cherie Noire"
1970	Le Bal du Comte d'Orgel	Marie	
1971	Traîté du rossignol	La femme du train	
1973	Bel ordure	La prostituée aux jouets	
1974	Sweet Movie	Mama Communa	
1995	Sept En Attente		(final film role)
