= Live at Bubba's =

Live album by Ahmad Jamal
- Released: 1981
- Recorded: March 20, 1980
- Genre: Jazz
- Length: 39:07
- Label: Who's Who in Jazz; WWLP-21021

Ahmad Jamal chronology
Night Song (1981)	Live at Bubba's (1981)	In Concert (1981)

Live at Bubba's is a live album by American jazz pianist Ahmad Jamal featuring performances recorded at Bubba's Jazz Restaurant in Fort Lauderdale, Florida, on May 20, 1980, and released on Who's Who in Jazz in 1981.

== Critical reception ==
Professional ratings
Review scores
Source	Rating
AllMusic	3/5 stars
MusicHound Jazz	3/5 stars
The Penguin Guide to Jazz Recordings	3/4 stars
The Virgin Encyclopedia of Jazz	3/5 stars

The AllMusic review awarded the album 3 stars, with Scott Yanow stating, "Although Ahmad Jamal's recording career was erratic at this period, his live performances were as good as his earlier work. Teamed up with bassist Sabu Adeyola and drummer Payton Crossley, Jamal interprets a diverse program highlighted by 'Waltz for Debbie' and 'I've Never Been In Love Before,' although recording 'People' was probably a mistake."

The authors of The Penguin Guide to Jazz Recordings called the album a "strong live set from an otherwise poorly documented period in Jamal's career."

== Track listing ==
1. "Waltz for Debby" (Bill Evans, Gene Lees) – 6:24
2. "The Folks Who Live on the Hill" (Oscar Hammerstein II, Jerome Kern) – 5:42
3. "People" (Bob Merrill, Jule Styne) – 5:34
4. "Baia" (Ary Barroso, Ray Gilbert) – 8:40
5. "The Good Life" (Sacha Distel, Frank Reardon) – 4:41
6. "Autumn in New York" (Vernon Duke) – 5:19
7. "I've Never Been in Love Before" (Frank Loesser) – 2:50

== Personnel ==
- Ahmad Jamal – piano
- Sabu Adeyola – bass
- Payton Crossley – drums
