= One (Ahmad Jamal album) =

Studio album by Ahmad Jamal
- Released: 1979
- Recorded: May, June & July 1978
- Genre: Jazz
- Labels: 20th Century Fox; T-555
- Producer: Bones Howe

Ahmad Jamal chronology
Recorded Live at Oil Can Harry's (1976)	One (1979)	Intervals (1980)

Professional ratings
Review scores
Source	Rating
Allmusic	2/5 stars

One is an album by American jazz pianist Ahmad Jamal featuring 1978 performances and released on 20th Century Fox in 1979.

== Track listing ==
1. "One (Ahad)" - (Sigidi Abdullah, Welton Gite) 8:40
2. "Just The Way You Are" - (Billy Joel) 6:54
3. "Jet" - (Bennie Benjamin, Harry Revel, George David Weiss) 5:05
4. "Black Cow" - (Walter Becker, Donald Fagen) 4:46
5. "Dynamo" - (Ahmad Jamal) 5:42
6. "Sumayah" - (Jamal) 5:14
7. "Festival" - (Jamal) 5:44

== Personnel ==
- Guitar: Steve Bowling, Mario Henderson, Calvin Keys, John Rowin
- Bass: Scotty Edwards, Chuck Rainey
- Keyboards: Ahmad Jamal, Mike Melvoin
- Drums: Roger Barthelemy, Andre Fisher, Eddie Marshall
- Percussion: Shondu Rondo Akeim, Hal Blaine, Paulinho Da Costa,
  Geoff Howe, Kenny Nash, Bill Summers
- Flute: David Crawford
- Double bass: John Heard
- Vocals: Virginia Ayers, Eloise Laws, Stephanie Spruill
- Conductors: Sigidi Abdullah, Mike Melvoin
