= Joseph Kosma =

Hungarian-French composer (1905–1969)

Background information
- Born: József Kozma; 22 October 1905
- Origin: Budapest, Hungary
- Died: 7 August 1969 (aged 63) La Roche-Guyon, Val-d'Oise, France
- Occupation: Composer
- Years active: 1930–1970

Joseph Kosma (22 October 1905 – 7 August 1969) was a Hungarian composer who immigrated to France. His most famous composition is the standard Autumn Leaves.

== Biography ==
Kosma was born József Kozma in Budapest, to a Jewish family, where his parents taught stenography and typing. He had a brother, Ákos. A maternal relative was the photographer László Moholy-Nagy, and another was the conductor Georg Solti. He started to play the piano at age five, and later took piano lessons. At the age of 11, he wrote his first opera, Christmas in the Trenches. After completing his education at the Secondary Grammar School Franz-Josef, he attended the Academy of Music in Budapest, where he studied with Leo Weiner. He also studied with Béla Bartók at the Liszt Academy, receiving diplomas in composition and conducting. He won a grant to study in Berlin in 1928, where he met Lilli Apel, another musician, whom he later married. Kosma also met and studied with Hanns Eisler in Berlin. He became acquainted with Bertolt Brecht and Helene Weigel.

Kosma and his wife immigrated to Paris in 1933. Eventually, he met Jacques Prévert, who introduced him to Jean Renoir. During the 1930s Kosma teamed up with Prévert to set a number of Prévert's poems to music, and have them recorded by popular singers. Several of these were hits. Kosma also composed scores to Renoir's films including La Grande Illusion (1937), La Bête Humaine (The Human Beast, 1938), and La Règle du jeu (The Rules of the Game, 1939).

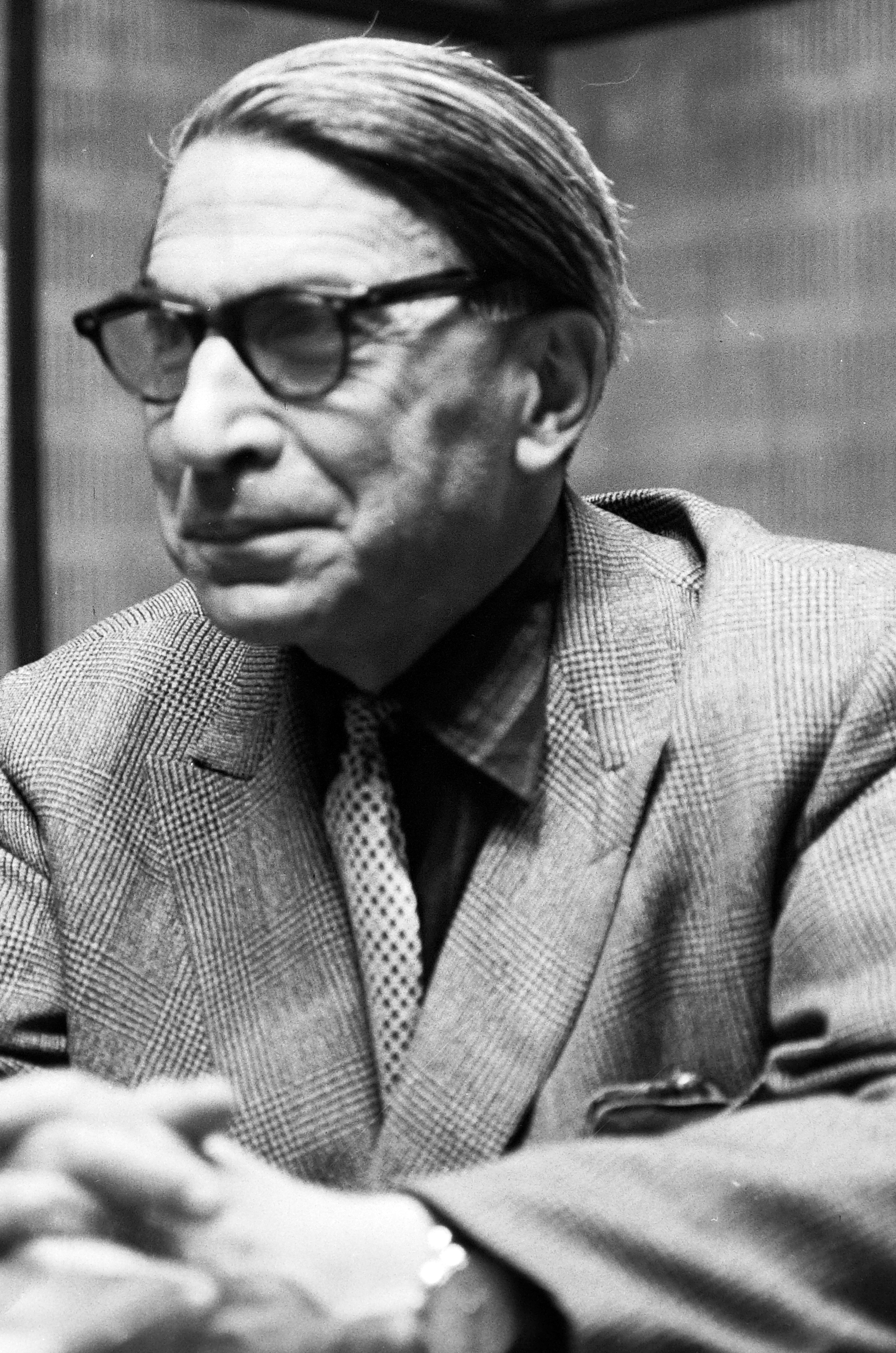
Joseph Kosma in 1963

During World War II and the Occupation of France, Kosma was placed under house arrest in the Alpes-Maritimes region and was banned from composition. However, Prévert managed to arrange for Kosma to contribute music for films with other composers fronting for him. Under this arrangement, he wrote the "pantomime" of the music for Les Enfants du Paradis (1945), made under the occupation but released after the liberation. Among his other credits are the scores to Voyage Surprise (1946) and Le Testament du docteur Cordelier (The Doctor's Horrible Experiment, 1959), the last of which was made for television.

Kosma was also known for writing the standard classical-jazz piece "Les feuilles mortes" with French lyrics by Prévert, which was derived from music in Marcel Carné's film Les Portes de la Nuit (1946). In 1950, Johnny Mercer added English lyrics to part of the song and titled it "Autumn Leaves", which was featured in the 1956 film Autumn Leaves starring Joan Crawford.

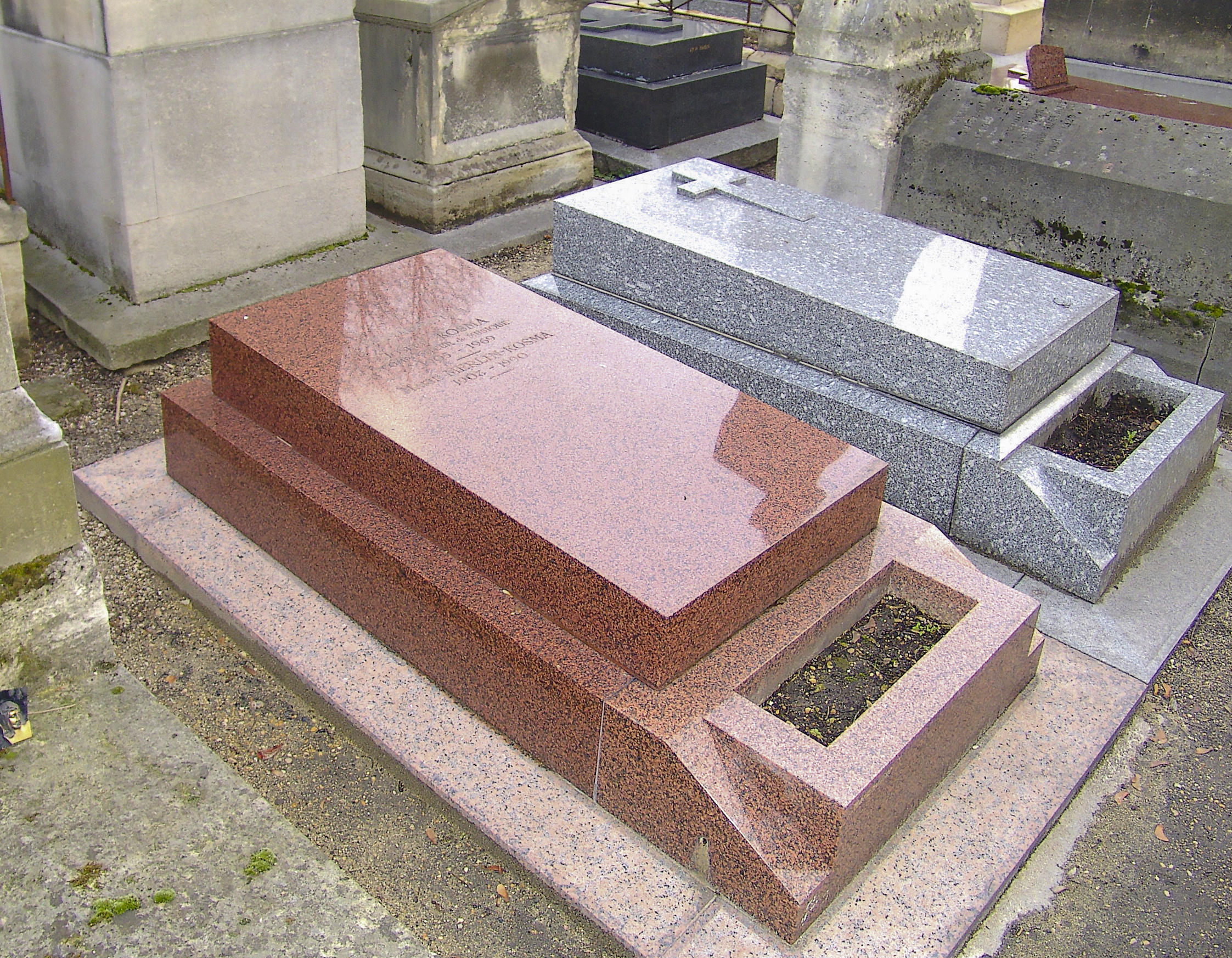
Joseph Kosma's tomb, Montmartre Cemetery, Paris

== Selected filmography ==
- La Grande Illusion (1937)
- The Time of the Cherries (1938)
- Goodbye Leonard (1943)
- A Woman in the Night (1943)
- Children of Paradise (1945)
- Messieurs Ludovic (1946)
- Gates of the Night (1946)
- Pétrus (1946)
- Love Around the House (1947)
- Mystery Trip (1947)
- Crossroads of Passion (1948)
- The Eleven O'Clock Woman (1948)
- The Lovers Of Verona (1949)
- The Farm of Seven Sins (1949)
- Passion for Life (1949)
- At the Grand Balcony (1949)
- Black Jack (1950)
- La Marie du port (1950)
- Vendetta in Camargue (1950)
- Shadow and Light (1951)
- Champions Juniors (1951)
- Sins of Madeleine (1951)
- The Cape of Hope (1951)
- Crimson Curtain (1952)
- Matrimonial Agency (1952)
- Wolves Hunt at Night (1952)
- Alarm in Morocco (1953)
- Rhine Virgin (1953)
- Innocents in Paris (1953)
- Operation Magali (1953)
- Huis clos (1954)
- Wild Fruit (1954)
- House on the Waterfront (1955)
- Goubbiah, mon amour (1956)
- Suspicion (1956)
- I'll Get Back to Kandara (1956)
- Three Days to Live (1957)
- The She-Wolves (1957)
- The Inspector Likes a Fight (1957)
- The Case of Doctor Laurent (1957)
- The Cat (1958)
- A Certain Monsieur Jo (1958)
- Picnic on the Grass (1959)
- Quay of Illusions (1959)
- Croesus (1960)
- The Cat Shows Her Claws (1960)
