= Chappes, Ardennes =

Chappes
- Commune
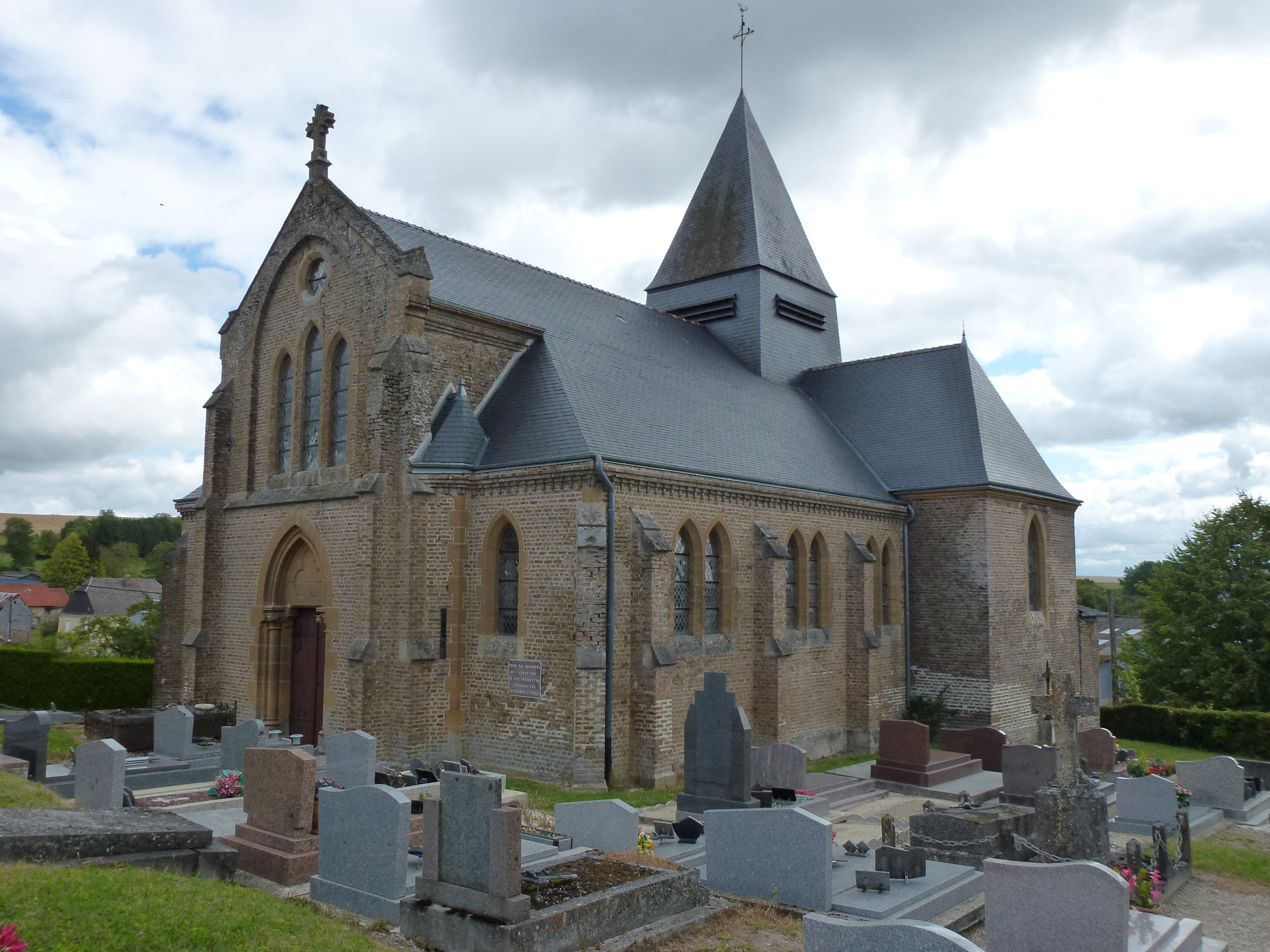
- The church in Chappes
- Location of Chappes
- Location within France Location within Grand Est
- Coordinates: 49°36′40″N 4°16′14″E
- Country: France
- Region: Grand Est
- Department: Ardennes
- Arrondissement: Rethel
- Canton: Signy-l'Abbaye
- Intercommunality: Crêtes Préardennaises

Government
  - Mayor (2020–2026): Joseph Malcorps
- Area^{1}: 9.59 km^{2} (3.70 sq mi)
- Elevation: 110 m (360 ft)
- Population (2023): 80
  - Density: 8.3/km^{2} (22/sq mi)
- Time zone: UTC+01:00 (CET)
  - Summer (DST): UTC+02:00 (CEST)
- INSEE/Postal code: 08102 /08220
- ^{1} French Land Register data, which excludes lakes, ponds, glaciers > 1 km^{2} (0.386 sq mi or 247 acres) and river estuaries.

Chappes (French pronunciation: [ʃap]) is a commune in the Ardennes department in northern France.

== Population ==
Historical population
Year	Pop.	±% p.a.
1968	117	—
1975	95	−2.93%
1982	89	−0.93%
1990	71	−2.78%
1999	91	+2.80%
2007	92	+0.14%
2012	97	+1.06%
2017	101	+0.81%
2023	80	−3.81%
Source: INSEE

== See also ==
- Communes of the Ardennes department
