= Black Orpheus =

1959 film by Marcel Camus

- Brazilian theatrical release poster
- Portuguese: Orfeu Negro
- Directed by: Marcel Camus
- Screenplay by: Marcel Camus; Jacques Viot
- Based on: Orfeu da Conceição; 1956 play by Vinicius de Moraes
- Produced by: Sacha Gordine
- Starring: Breno Mello; Marpessa Dawn
- Cinematography: Jean Bourgoin
- Edited by: Andrée Feix
- Music by: Luiz Bonfá; Antônio Carlos Jobim
- Production companies: Dispat Films (France); Gemma (Italy); Tupan Filmes (Brazil)
- Distributed by: Lopert Pictures
- Release date: 12 June 1959 (France)
- Running time: 107 minutes
- Countries: France; Brazil; Italy
- Language: Portuguese
- Box office: US$750,000

Black Orpheus (Portuguese: Orfeu Negro [ɔhˈfew ˈnegɾu]) is a 1959 romantic tragedy film directed by French filmmaker Marcel Camus and starring Marpessa Dawn and Breno Mello. It is based on the play Orfeu da Conceição by Vinicius de Moraes, which set the Greek legend of Orpheus and Eurydice in a contemporary favela in Rio de Janeiro during Carnaval. The film was an international co-production among companies in Brazil, France and Italy.

The film is particularly noted for its soundtrack by two Brazilian composers: Antônio Carlos Jobim, whose song "A felicidade" opens the film, and Luiz Bonfá, whose "Manhã de Carnaval" and "Samba de Orfeu" have become classics of bossa nova. The songs performed by Orfeu were dubbed by singer Agostinho dos Santos. Lengthy passages of filming took place in the Morro da Babilônia, a favela in the Leme neighbourhood of Rio.

Black Orpheus won the Palme d'Or at the 1959 Cannes Film Festival, the Academy Award for Best Foreign Language Film, the Golden Globe Award for Best Foreign Language Film, and was nominated for the BAFTA Award for Best Film.

While the film has been celebrated internationally, it has been criticized by some Brazilian film critics and scholars for exoticizing Brazil for an international audience, reinforcing stereotypes.

== Plot ==
A marble Greek bas-relief explodes, revealing Afro-Brazilian men dancing the samba to drums in a favela. Eurydice arrives in Rio de Janeiro and takes a trolley driven by Orfeu. New to the city, she rides to the end of the line, where Orfeu introduces her to the station guard, Hermes, who gives her directions to the home of her cousin Serafina.

Although engaged to Mira, Orfeu is not very enthusiastic about their upcoming marriage. The couple goes to get a marriage license. When the clerk at the courthouse hears Orfeu's name, he jokingly asks if Mira is Eurydice, annoying her. Afterward, Mira insists on getting an engagement ring. Though Orfeu has just been paid, he would rather use his money to get his guitar out of the pawn shop for Carnival. Mira finally offers to loan Orfeu the money to buy her ring.

When Orfeu goes home, he is pleased to find Eurydice staying next door with Serafina. Eurydice has run away to Rio to hide from a strange man whom she believes wants to kill her. The man – Death dressed in a stylized skeleton costume – finds her, but Orfeu gallantly chases him away. Orfeu and Eurydice fall in love, yet are constantly on the run from both Mira and Death. When Serafina's sailor boyfriend Chico shows up, Orfeu offers to let Eurydice sleep in his home, while he takes the hammock outside. Eurydice invites him to her bed, and they have sex.

Orfeu, Mira, and Serafina are the principal members of a samba school, one of many parading during Carnival. Serafina decides to have Eurydice dress in her Queen of the Night costume so that she can spend more time with Chico. A veil conceals Eurydice's face; only Orfeu is told of the deception. During the parade, Orfeu dances with Eurydice rather than Mira.

Eventually, Mira spots Serafina among the spectators and rips off Eurydice's veil. Eurydice is forced once again to run for her life, first from Mira and then from Death. Trapped in Orfeu's own trolley station, she hangs from a power line to get away from Death and is accidentally killed by Orfeu when he turns the power on and electrocutes her. Death tells Orfeu, "Now she's mine," before knocking him out.

Distraught, Orfeu looks for Eurydice at the Office of Missing Persons, although Hermes has told him she is dead. The building is deserted at night, with only a janitor sweeping up. He tells Orfeu that the place holds only papers and that no people can be found there. Taking pity on Orfeu, the janitor takes him down a large darkened spiral staircase – a reference to the mythical Orpheus' descent into the underworld – to a Macumba ritual, a regional form of the Afro-Brazilian religion Candomblé.

At the gate, they pass a guard dog named Cerberus. During the ritual, the janitor tells Orfeu to call to his beloved by singing. The spirit of Eurydice inhabits the body of an old woman and speaks to him. Orfeu wants to gaze upon her, but Eurydice begs him not to, lest he lose her forever. When he turns and looks anyway, he sees the old woman, and Eurydice's spirit departs, as in the Greek myth.

Orfeu wanders in mourning. He retrieves Eurydice's body from the city morgue and carries her in his arms across town and up the hill toward his home, where his shack is burning. A vengeful Mira flings a stone that hits him in the head and knocks him over a cliff to his death, with Eurydice still in his arms.

Two children, Benedito and Zeca – who have followed Orfeu throughout the film – believe Orfeu's tale that his guitar playing causes the sun to rise every morning. After Orfeu's death, Benedito insists that Zeca pick up the guitar and play so that the sun will rise. Zeca plays, and the sun comes up. A little girl appears, gives Zeca a single flower, and the three children dance.

== Cast ==
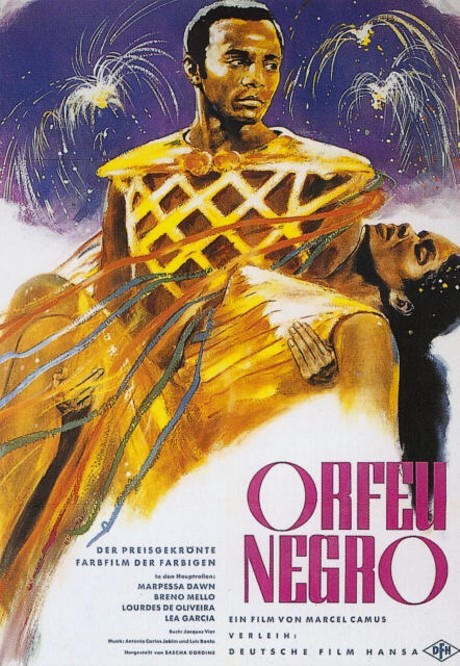
Poster by Helmuth Ellgaard for the German release

- Breno Mello as Orfeu
- Marpessa Dawn as Eurydice
- Marcel Camus as Ernesto
- Fausto Guerzoni as Fausto
- Lourdes de Oliveira as Mira
- Léa Garcia as Serafina
- Adhemar da Silva as Death
- Alexandro Constantino as Hermes
- Waldemar De Souza as Chico
- Jorge Dos Santos as Benedito
- Aurino Cassiano as Zeca

Notes

- Marpessa Dawn was not from Brazil, but was born near Pittsburgh, Pennsylvania.
- Breno Mello was a soccer player with no acting experience at the time he was cast as Orfeu. Mello was walking on the street in Rio de Janeiro when director Marcel Camus stopped him and asked if he would like to be in a film.
- Da Silva, the actor who played Death, was a triple jumper who won two Olympic gold medals, in 1952 and 1956.
- The role of Zeca was played by Aurino Cassiano, a young musician from a large musical family. With brother Amaury on cavaquinho and Aurino on pandeiro, they performed in the streets, calling themselves "Dupla Chuvisco". In 1957, they were invited to perform in a film, Pega Ladrão, and then Aurino appeared in another, Vai que é Mole. It was during the filming of Vai que é Mole that Marcel Camus saw Aurino performing on location, and invited him to test for Black Orpheus.

== Reception ==
=== Critical response ===
On Rotten Tomatoes, the film holds a rating of 87% from 71 reviews, and an average rating of 7.9/10, with the consensus: "Colorful, atmospheric, and infectious, Black Orpheus takes an ancient tale and makes it fresh anew, thanks in part to its bewitching bossa nova soundtrack." Metacritic assigned the film a weighted average score of 81 out of 100, based on 8 critics, indicating "universal acclaim".

However, the film has been criticized, especially in Brazil. Vinicius de Moraes, author of the 1956 play Orfeu da Conceição upon which the film was based, was outraged and left the theater in the middle of the screening. Critics of the adaptation by Marcel Camus argued that it reinforced various stereotypes about Brazilian culture and society and about Afro-Brazilians specifically, portraying the characters as "simple-minded, overtly sexual, and interested only in singing and dancing." Setting out to make itself more "appealing" to foreign audiences, the film resorts to a "cheap and problematic exoticism" of Brazil.

=== Awards and nominations ===
Black Orpheus won the Palme d'Or at the 1959 Cannes Film Festival, the 1960 Academy Award for Best Foreign Language Film, and the 1960 Golden Globe Award for Best Foreign Film, and was nominated for the 1961 BAFTA Award for Best Film. In the last case, Brazil was credited together with France and Italy. In July 2021, the film was shown in the Cannes Classics section at the 2021 Cannes Film Festival.

== Influence ==
Black Orpheus was cited by artist Jean-Michel Basquiat as one of his early musical influences, while Barack Obama notes in his memoir Dreams from My Father (1995) that it was his mother's favorite film. Obama, however, did not share his mother's preferences upon first watching the film during his first years at Columbia University: "I suddenly realized that the depiction of the childlike blacks I was now seeing on the screen, the reverse image of Conrad's dark savages, was what my mother had carried with her to Hawaii all those years before, a reflection of the simple fantasies that had been forbidden to a white, middle-class girl from Kansas, the promise of another life: warm, sensual, exotic, different."

The film's soundtrack also inspired Vince Guaraldi's 1962 album Jazz Impressions of Black Orpheus.

As a child, filmmaker Bong Joon-ho watched the film on Korean television and it made a big impact on him.

Arcade Fire's fourth studio album Reflektor (2013) featured themes linked and inspired by the film.

== See also ==
- Orfeu, a 1999 film adapted from the same source material
- List of submissions to the 32nd Academy Awards for Best Foreign Language Film
- List of French submissions for the Academy Award for Best Foreign Language Film
