= Orfeu da Conceição =

1956 play by Vinicius de Moraes

- Original language: Portuguese
- Written by: Vinicius de Moraes
- Based on: Orpheus and Eurydice
- Genre: Tragedy
- Setting: A contemporary (1950s) morro in Rio de Janeiro

Premiere
- Date: 25 September 1956
- Place: Theatro Municipal do Rio de Janeiro
- Official website

Orfeu da Conceição (Orpheus of the Conception) (Note: Possibly a reference to the Rio favela Vila Imaculada Conceição, or Conception Hill (Morro da Conceição (Rio de Janeiro)) is a stage play with music in three acts by Vinicius de Moraes and music by Antônio Carlos Jobim that premiered in 1956 in Rio de Janeiro. The play became the basis for the films Orfeu Negro (Black Orpheus, 1959) and Orfeu (1999), and for the musicals Orfeu (Brazil, 2010) and Black Orpheus (Broadway, 2014).

The play sets the Greek myth of Orpheus and Eurydice in a contemporary favela in Rio de Janeiro during the Brazilian Carnival. Started in 1954, the play was first performed on 25 September 1956 at the Theatro Municipal in Rio de Janeiro.

Vinicius de Moraes assembled major names of Brazilian culture to participate in the production. Antônio Carlos Jobim co-wrote the songs and conducted the orchestra, Luiz Bonfá performed on guitar, Oscar Niemeyer did the stage design, Djanira and Carlos Scliar designed the posters, and Abdias do Nascimento performed in the original cast and provided other actors from his Black Experimental Theater.

Songs to the play were released on an Odeon-EMI LP (MODB 3.056) in the year of the play's premiere.

== Album ==
Orfeu da Conceição

Soundtrack album by Tom Jobim and Vinicius de Moraes
- Released: 1956
- Genre: MPB, Samba, Bossa nova
- Label: Odeon

The soundtrack was released as an LP by Odeon. It is considered the first album of songs by the duo Antônio Carlos Jobim and Vinicius de Moraes; the two wrote the seven compositions of this LP for the play. The music was orchestrated and conducted by Jobim, who directed Le Grand Orchestre Odeon, a 35-piece orchestra.

The album also has Luiz Bonfá on guitar and Roberto Paiva singing "Um nome de mulher", "Se todos fossem iguais a você", "Mulher, sempre mulher", "Eu e o meu amor", "Lamento no morro." Vinicius de Moraes recites and dramatizes the monolog of Orpheus. The album was recorded in high fidelity and released as a 10" LP with cover art by Raimundo Nogueira.

=== Track listing ===
1. Overture – 06:45
2. Monólogo de Orfeu – 02:52
3. Um nome de mulher – 02:05
4. Se todos fossem iguais a você – 03:31
5. Mulher, sempre mulher – 01:56
6. Eu e o meu amor – 01:41
7. Lamento no morro – 02:06

== Notes and references ==
Notes

References'
