= Antônio Maria =

Brazilian lyricist, commentator & poet (1921–1964)

- Born: Antônio Maria de Araújo Morais; 17 March 1921; Recife, Brazil
- Died: 15 October 1964 (aged 43) Copacabana, Brazil
- Occupations: Lyricist, sports commentator, poet, composer

Antônio Maria de Araújo Morais, known as Antônio Maria (17 March 1921—15 October 1964), was a Brazilian writer of pop music lyrics as well as radio sports commentator, poet, composer, and chronicler.

== Career ==
At 17 he got his first job presenting a musical program at Pernambuco's Radio club. In 1940, he arrived in Rio de Janeiro, "with four changes of clothing and five quid in the pocket", to work as a sports commentator for Radio Ipanema. The job didn't last long and he went back to Recife, where he married Maria Gonçalves Ferreira in May 1944. By 1948, he was back in Rio. His family now increased by a son and daughter, Rita and Antônio Maria Filho, he took a position as Rádio Tupi's production director, and was also a feature writer for the "O Jornal" newspaper.

Antônio Maria wrote daily features for more than 15 years - a daily account of what was going on in Rio de Janeiro. Up until 1955, his by-line appeared on "Long is The Night - A Noite É Grande", the "Antônio Maria Report - Jornal de Antônio Maria" and "Copacabana Cop's Story - Romance Policial de Copacabana".

In his Cop's Story column, Antônio Maria would frequently interview the protagonists of the moment, right in the police stations and on the streets of Copacabana or in the middle of the night. Author of advertising jingles, he ended up writing pop music lyrics. In 1952, two of his works: "Menino Grande" and "Ninguém Me Ama", were Top Ten hits on the Brazilian radio. In 1959, in partnership with Luiz Bonfá, he composed the incomparable hits: "Manhã de Carnaval" and "Samba do Orfeu".

Antônio Maria lived his life to the full, both in Rio and in Pernambuco. His great friend, Vinicius de Moraes, fondly called him 'Pernambaioca' (a mixture of Pernambucano - a native of Northeastern Brazil, and Carioca - a native of Rio de Janeiro).

== Death ==
Maria died of a sudden heart attack at age 43 on 15 October 1964 outside of a Copacabana restaurant.
