= Jitterbug Waltz =

Single by Thomas "Fats" Waller and His Rhythm
- Recorded: March 16, 1942
- Studio: RCA Victor
- Genre: Jazz • swing • waltz
- Songwriter: Fats Waller

"Jitterbug Waltz" is a 1942 jazz composition by Fats Waller. Initially recorded the same year by his jazz combo, Fats Waller and His Rhythm, it has been performed and recorded by numerous musicians, including Art Tatum, Erroll Garner, Chet Atkins, Vince Guaraldi, Butch Thompson, Al Hirt, Eric Dolphy, Michel Legrand, Anthony Braxton and David Murray.

== Composition and recording ==
The song is in the key of E♭ major and is in 3/4 time.

The melody was inspired by piano exercises that Waller's son, Maurice, had been playing at the time. Maurice claims that Jitterbug Waltz was the first jazz waltz ever written.

When Waller composed "Jitterbug Waltz", he was 38 years old and at the high point of his career as a veteran recording artist for RCA Victor. It is notable for being one of the first jazz records recorded with a Hammond organ, an instrument that gained popularity in the genre soon after.

== In popular media ==
- Waller's original recording was licensed for use in the 2010 video game Bioshock 2.
