= The Singles (Phil Collins album) =

- The standard edition album cover. The deluxe edition album cover is the same image, but with a maroon background.

Compilation album by Phil Collins
- Released: 14 October 2016
- Recorded: 1980–2010
- Genres: Pop rock; rock; soft rock
- Length: 152:42 (2CD edition); 201:52 (3CD edition)
- Labels: Atlantic; WEA
- Producers: Phil Collins; Babyface; Rob Cavallo; Mark Mancina; Arif Mardin; Hugh Padgham

Phil Collins chronology
Take a Look at Me Now: The Collection (2016)	The Singles (2016)	Plays Well with Others (2018)

Professional ratings
Review scores
Source	Rating
AllMusic	4.5/5 stars

The Singles is a compilation album by English musician Phil Collins. It was released on 14 October 2016 through Atlantic Records and Warner Music. The album is Collins' fourth compilation album—after ...Hits (1998), The Platinum Collection (2004) and Love Songs: A Compilation... Old and New (2004)—and came at the end of his Take a Look at Me Now series, which saw him remaster and reissue his entire back catalogue dating back to 1981's Face Value. The compilation is made up of most of the hit singles from Collins' solo career, as well as lesser-known singles. The album was released in two versions, a standard 2-CD edition and a deluxe 3-CD edition. A vinyl edition was also released, first available as a 4-LP set with the same track list as in standard 2-CD edition, but it was, in 2018, replaced with a 2-LP set, which have only 19 selected tracks from previous version.

== Track listing ==
All tracks written by Phil Collins, except where noted.

=== Standard 2-CD edition ===
Disc one
No.	Title	Writer(s)	Original album	Length
1.	"Easy Lover" (with Philip Bailey)	Collins, Bailey, Nathan East	Bailey's Chinese Wall (1984)	5:03
2.	"Two Hearts"	Collins, Lamont Dozier	Buster: The Original Motion Picture Soundtrack (1988)	3:24
3.	"Sussudio"		No Jacket Required (1985)	4:23
4.	"I Missed Again"		Face Value (1981)	3:46
5.	"Wear My Hat"		Dance into the Light (1996)	4:44
6.	"Don't Lose My Number"		No Jacket Required	4:48
7.	"You Can't Hurry Love"	Holland–Dozier–Holland	Hello, I Must Be Going! (1982)	2:55
8.	"Something Happened on the Way to Heaven"	Collins, Daryl Stuermer	...But Seriously (1989)	4:51
9.	"We Wait and We Wonder"		Both Sides (1993)	7:01
10.	"Can't Stop Loving You"	Billy Nicholls	Testify (2002)	4:16
11.	"Dance into the Light"		Dance into the Light	4:23
12.	"It's in Your Eyes"		Dance into the Light	3:02
13.	"Hang in Long Enough"		...But Seriously	4:44
14.	"Thru These Walls"		Hello, I Must Be Going!	5:05
15.	"I Wish It Would Rain Down"		...But Seriously	5:27
16.	"Both Sides of the Story"		Both Sides	6:43
17.	"(Love Is Like a) Heatwave"	Holland–Dozier–Holland	Going Back (2010)	2:53

Disc two
No.	Title	Writer(s)	Original album	Length
1.	"Going Back"	Gerry Goffin, Carole King	Going Back	4:37
2.	"In the Air Tonight"		Face Value	5:35
3.	"Against All Odds (Take a Look at Me Now)"		Against All Odds: Music from the Original Motion Picture Soundtrack (1984)	3:26
4.	"If Leaving Me Is Easy"		Face Value	4:55
5.	"One More Night"		No Jacket Required	4:51
6.	"Separate Lives" (with Marilyn Martin)	Stephen Bishop	White Nights: Original Motion Picture Soundtrack (1985)	4:08
7.	"A Groovy Kind of Love"	Carole Bayer Sager, Toni Wine	Buster: The Original Motion Picture Soundtrack	3:30
8.	"That's Just the Way It Is"		...But Seriously	5:20
9.	"Do You Remember?"		...But Seriously	4:36
10.	"Everyday"		Both Sides	5:43
11.	"True Colors"	Tom Kelly, Billy Steinberg	...Hits (1998)	4:34
12.	"You'll Be in My Heart"		Tarzan: An Original Walt Disney Records Soundtrack (1999)	4:17
13.	"The Least You Can Do"	Collins, Stuermer	Testify	4:21
14.	"Look Through My Eyes"		Brother Bear: An Original Walt Disney Records Soundtrack (2003)	4:00
15.	"Another Day in Paradise"		...But Seriously	5:22
16.	"Take Me Home"		No Jacket Required	5:51

=== Deluxe 3-CD edition ===
Disc one
No.	Title	Writer(s)	Original album	Length
1.	"In the Air Tonight"		Face Value	5:35
2.	"I Missed Again"		Face Value	3:46
3.	"If Leaving Me Is Easy"		Face Value	4:55
4.	"Thru These Walls"		Hello, I Must Be Going!	5:05
5.	"You Can't Hurry Love"	Holland–Dozier–Holland	Hello, I Must Be Going!	2:55
6.	"I Don't Care Anymore"		Hello, I Must Be Going!	5:05
7.	"Don't Let Him Steal Your Heart Away"		Hello, I Must Be Going!	4:45
8.	"Why Can't It Wait 'Til Morning"		Hello, I Must Be Going!	3:10
9.	"I Cannot Believe It's True"		Hello, I Must Be Going!	5:16
10.	"Against All Odds (Take a Look at Me Now)"		Against All Odds: Music from the Original Motion Picture Soundtrack	3:26
11.	"Easy Lover" (with Philip Bailey)	Collins, Bailey, Nathan East	Bailey's Chinese Wall	5:03
12.	"Sussudio"		No Jacket Required	4:23
13.	"One More Night"		No Jacket Required	4:51
14.	"Don't Lose My Number"		No Jacket Required	4:48
15.	"Take Me Home"		No Jacket Required	5:51

Disc two
No.	Title	Writer(s)	Original album	Length
1.	"Separate Lives" (with Marilyn Martin)	Stephen Bishop	White Nights: Original Motion Picture Soundtrack	4:08
2.	"A Groovy Kind of Love"	Carole Bayer Sager, Toni Wine	Buster: The Original Motion Picture Soundtrack	3:30
3.	"Two Hearts"	Collins, Lamont Dozier	Buster: The Original Motion Picture Soundtrack	3:24
4.	"Another Day in Paradise"		...But Seriously	5:22
5.	"I Wish It Would Rain Down"		...But Seriously	5:27
6.	"Something Happened on the Way to Heaven"	Collins, Daryl Stuermer	...But Seriously	4:51
7.	"That's Just the Way It Is"		...But Seriously	5:20
8.	"Hang in Long Enough"		...But Seriously	4:44
9.	"Do You Remember?"		...But Seriously	4:36
10.	"Who Said I Would"		No Jacket Required	4:02
11.	"Both Sides of the Story"		Both Sides	6:43
12.	"Everyday"		Both Sides	5:43
13.	"We Wait and We Wonder"		Both Sides	7:01
14.	"Dance into the Light"		Dance into the Light	4:23
15.	"It's in Your Eyes"		Dance into the Light	3:02

Disc three
No.	Title	Writer(s)	Original album	Length
1.	"No Matter Who"		Dance into the Light	4:41
2.	"Wear My Hat"		Dance into the Light	4:44
3.	"The Same Moon"		Dance into the Light	4:10
4.	"True Colors"	Tom Kelly, Billy Steinberg	...Hits	4:34
5.	"You'll Be in My Heart"		Tarzan: An Original Walt Disney Records Soundtrack	4:17
6.	"Strangers Like Me"		Tarzan: An Original Walt Disney Records Soundtrack	3:02
7.	"Son of Man"		Tarzan: An Original Walt Disney Records Soundtrack	2:44
8.	"Two Worlds"		Tarzan: An Original Walt Disney Records Soundtrack	2:42
9.	"Can't Stop Loving You"	Billy Nicholls	Testify	4:16
10.	"The Least You Can Do"	Collins, Stuermer	Testify	4:21
11.	"Wake Up Call"		Testify	5:15
12.	"Look Through My Eyes"		Brother Bear: An Original Walt Disney Records Soundtrack	4:00
13.	"No Way Out"		Brother Bear: An Original Walt Disney Records Soundtrack	4:17
14.	"(Love Is Like a) Heatwave"	Holland–Dozier–Holland	Going Back	2:53
15.	"Going Back"	Gerry Goffin, Carole King	Going Back	4:37

For the 3-CD edition of the album, the songs are arranged in chronological order with the exception of "Who Said I Would" (originally from No Jacket Required) which was released as a live single from the album Serious Hits... Live! (1990), released between the studio album releases of ...But Seriously and Both Sides.

== Charts ==
=== Weekly charts ===
Weekly chart performance for The Singles
Chart (2016)	Peak position
Australian Albums (ARIA)	6
Austrian Albums (Ö3 Austria)	43
Belgian Albums (Ultratop Flanders)	7
Belgian Albums (Ultratop Wallonia)	13
Canadian Albums (Billboard)	47
Dutch Albums (Album Top 100)	18
French Albums (SNEP)	15
German Albums (Offizielle Top 100)	5
Italian Albums (FIMI)	23
Irish Albums (Official Charts)	10
New Zealand Albums (RMNZ)	27
Portuguese Albums (AFP)	27
Scottish Albums (Official Charts)	4
Spanish Albums (Promusicae)	30
Swiss Albums (Schweizer Hitparade)	17
UK Albums (Official Charts)	2
UK Album Downloads (Official Charts)	7
US Billboard 200	44
US Top Catalog Albums (Billboard)	28
US Top Rock Albums (Billboard)	8

Chart (2025–2026)	Peak position
German Pop Albums (Offizielle Top 100)	15
Greek Albums (IFPI)	16
Hungarian Physical Albums (MAHASZ)	6

=== Year-end charts ===
Year-end chart performance for The Singles
Chart	Year	Position
Australian Albums (ARIA)	2016	76
Belgian Albums (Ultratop Flanders)	2016	126
Belgian Albums (Ultratop Wallonia)	2016	124
French Albums (SNEP)	2016	192
German Albums (Offizielle Top 100)	2016	79
UK Albums (OCC)	2016	29
Belgian Albums (Ultratop Flanders)	2017	102
Belgian Albums (Ultratop Wallonia)	2017	148
UK Albums (OCC)	2017	92
Belgian Albums (Ultratop Flanders)	2018	165
UK Albums (OCC)	2020	93
UK Albums (OCC)	2021	79
UK Albums (OCC)	2022	80
UK Albums (OCC)	2023	83
UK Albums (OCC)	2024	87
UK Albums (OCC)	2025	81

== Certifications ==
Certifications for The Singles
Region	Certification	Certified units/sales
Denmark (IFPI Danmark)	Gold	10,000^{‡}
France (SNEP)	2× Platinum	200,000^{‡}
New Zealand (RMNZ)	Gold	7,500^{‡}
United Kingdom (BPI)	2× Platinum	600,000^{‡}
^{‡} Sales+streaming figures based on certification alone.
