= The Platinum Collection (Phil Collins album) =

Compilation album by Phil Collins
- Released: 31 May 2004
- Recorded: 1980–1989
- Genres: Pop; pop rock
- Length: 2:37:58
- Label: Virgin
- Producers: Phil Collins; Hugh Padgham

Phil Collins chronology
| Brother Bear: An Original Walt Disney Records Soundtrack (2003) | The Platinum Collection (2004) | Love Songs: A Compilation... Old and New (2004) |

The Platinum Collection is a compilation album by the English drummer and singer Phil Collins, released on 31 May 2004 by Virgin Records.

The set consists of all three of Collins' number one albums in the UK: Face Value (1981), No Jacket Required (1985) and ...But Seriously (1989). The last two also reached number one in the United States.

The individual albums featured several of Collins' most successful singles, including "In the Air Tonight", "One More Night" and "Another Day in Paradise". The collection sold approximately 200,000 copies and reached number four in the UK.

In 2010, a different collection of the same name was released in some European countries, which consisted of Face Value, Both Sides (1993) and Testify (2002).

== Track listing ==
=== Disc 1 (Face Value) ===
1. "In the Air Tonight" – 5:32
2. "This Must Be Love" – 3:55
3. "Behind the Lines" – 3:53
4. "The Roof Is Leaking" – 3:16
5. "Droned" – 2:55
6. "Hand in Hand" – 5:12
7. "I Missed Again" – 3:41
8. "You Know What I Mean" – 2:33
9. "Thunder and Lightning" – 4:12
10. "I'm Not Moving" – 2:33
11. "If Leaving Me Is Easy" – 4:54
12. "Tomorrow Never Knows" – 4:46

=== Disc 2 (No Jacket Required) ===
1. "Sussudio" – 4:23
2. "Only You Know and I Know" – 4:20
3. "Long Long Way to Go" – 4:20
4. "I Don't Wanna Know" – 4:12
5. "One More Night" – 4:47
6. "Don't Lose My Number" – 4:46
7. "Who Said I Would" – 4:01
8. "Doesn't Anybody Stay Together Anymore" – 4:18
9. "Inside Out" – 5:14
10. "Take Me Home" – 5:51
11. "We Said Hello Goodbye" – 4:15

=== Disc 3 (...But Seriously) ===
1. "Hang in Long Enough" – 4:44
2. "That's Just the Way It Is" – 5:20
3. "Do You Remember?" – 4:36
4. "Something Happened on the Way to Heaven" – 4:52
5. "Colours" – 8:51
6. "I Wish It Would Rain Down" – 5:28
7. "Another Day in Paradise" – 5:22
8. "Heat on the Street" – 3:51
9. "All of My Life" – 5:36
10. "Saturday Night and Sunday Morning" – 1:26
11. "Father to Son" – 3:28
12. "Find a Way to My Heart" – 6:08

== Reception ==
- AllMusic
