= Hits (Phil Collins album) =

1998 greatest hits album by Phil Collins

...Hits

Greatest hits album by Phil Collins
- Released: 5 October 1998
- Recorded: 1980–1998
- Genres: Pop rock; soft rock
- Length: 74:01
- Labels: Face Value; Virgin
- Producers: Phil Collins; Hugh Padgham; Babyface; Lamont Dozier; Arif Mardin; Anne Dudley

Phil Collins chronology
Dance into the Light (1996)	...Hits (1998)	Tarzan: An Original Walt Disney Records Soundtrack (1999)

Singles from ...Hits
- 1. "True Colors" Released: 5 October 1998

Professional ratings
Review scores
Source	Rating
AllMusic	4.5/5 stars

Hits (stylised as ...Hits) is the first greatest hits album by the English drummer and singer-songwriter Phil Collins. It was released on 5 October 1998 in the United Kingdom, and one day later in the United States. The collection included fourteen top 40 hits, including seven American number one songs, spanning from the albums Face Value (1981) through Dance into the Light (1996). One new Collins recording, a cover of Cyndi Lauper's "True Colors", also appeared on the collection and was a popular song on adult contemporary stations. Hits was also the first Phil Collins album to include four songs originally recorded for motion pictures (all of them US number-one hits) as well as his popular duet with Philip Bailey, "Easy Lover" (a UK number-one hit).

In 1998, the album reached number one in the United Kingdom and number 18 in the United States. It was reissued in 2008, following the usage of "In the Air Tonight" in a successful Cadbury advertisement campaign. On 4 August 2008, it became the number one album on the New Zealand RIANZ album chart. In July 2012, the album re-entered the US charts, reaching number six on the Billboard 200 when the album price was deeply discounted very briefly by Amazon. It has sold 3,429,000 in the US as of July 2012.

The compilation's cover features stylised versions of the cover art for Collins' first six albums, the collection's primary sources of songs.

Since the release of Hits there have been further compilations of Phil Collins songs. The Platinum Collection and Love Songs: A Compilation... Old and New were both released in 2004, while The Singles appeared in 2016.

== Track listing ==
All tracks are written by Phil Collins, except where noted.

...Hits – Standard edition
No.	Title	Writer(s)	Originally released on	Length
1.	"Another Day in Paradise"		...But Seriously (1989)	5:22
2.	"True Colors"	Billy Steinberg; Tom Kelly	previously unreleased	4:34
3.	"Easy Lover" (with Philip Bailey)	Collins; Bailey; Nathan East	Chinese Wall (1984)	5:02
4.	"You Can't Hurry Love"	Holland–Dozier–Holland	Hello, I Must Be Going! (1982)	2:52
5.	"Two Hearts"	Collins; Lamont Dozier	Buster: The Original Motion Picture Soundtrack (1988)	3:24
6.	"I Wish It Would Rain Down"		...But Seriously (1989)	5:28
7.	"Against All Odds (Take a Look at Me Now)"		Against All Odds: Music from the Original Motion Picture Soundtrack (1984)	3:25
8.	"Something Happened on the Way to Heaven"	Collins; Daryl Stuermer	...But Seriously (1989)	4:51
9.	"Separate Lives" (with Marilyn Martin)	Stephen Bishop	White Nights (1985)	4:06
10.	"Both Sides of the Story"		Both Sides (1993)	6:37
11.	"One More Night"		No Jacket Required (1985)	4:46
12.	"Sussudio"		No Jacket Required (1985)	4:21
13.	"Dance into the Light"		Dance into the Light (1996)	4:22
14.	"A Groovy Kind of Love"	Toni Wine; Carole Bayer Sager	Buster: The Original Motion Picture Soundtrack (1988)	3:29
15.	"In the Air Tonight"		Face Value (1981)	5:30
16.	"Take Me Home"		No Jacket Required (1985)	5:52
Total length:				74:01

=== Track notes ===
- Track 1 features David Crosby on backing vocals.
- Track 2 features Babyface on backing vocals, keyboard and drum programming, and Sheila E on percussion.
- Track 3 features Philip Bailey on vocals.
- Tracks 4, 11–13, 15 feature Daryl Stuermer on guitar.
- Track 6 features Eric Clapton on guitar.
- Tracks 8, 13 feature Nathan East on bass.
- Track 9 features Marilyn Martin on vocals.
- Track 16 features Peter Gabriel, Sting, and Helen Terry on backing vocals.

== Personnel ==
- Phil Collins – vocals, keyboards (1, 3, 6, 8, 11, 14–16), drums (1–9, 13–16), tambourine (4, 6), all instruments (10), drum machine (11, 12, 15, 16), backing vocals (11, 13, 16), kalimba (13), horn arrangements (13), percussion (various tracks)
- Babyface – keyboards (2), drum programming (2), backing vocals (2)
- Greg Phillinganes – acoustic piano (2), Wurlitzer electric piano (2)
- Lesette Wilson – keyboards (3)
- Peter Robinson – acoustic piano (4), glockenspiel (4), vibraphone (4)
- Rob Mounsey – keyboards (7)
- Nick Glennie-Smith – keyboards (9)
- David Frank – keyboards (12), Minimoog bass (12), Oberheim DMX (12)
- Brad Cole – keyboards (13)
- Dominic Miller – guitars (1, 8)
- Michael Thompson – guitar (2)
- Daryl Stuermer – guitars (3, 4, 8, 9, 11, 12, 15, 16), lead guitar (13)
- Michael Landau – guitar (5)
- Eric Clapton – guitars (6)
- Ronnie Caryl – rhythm guitar (13)
- Leland Sklar – bass (1, 11, 16)
- Cornelius Mims – bass (2)
- Nathan East – bass (3, 8, 13)
- John Giblin – bass (4, 15)
- Freddie Washington – bass (5)
- Pino Palladino – bass (6)
- Sheila E. – percussion (2)
- Paulinho da Costa – percussion (5)
- Eric Rigler – Uilleann pipes (2)
- The Phenix Horns
  - Don Myrick – saxophones (8, 12), sax solo (11)
  - Louis Satterfield – trombone (8, 12)
  - Rhamlee Michael Davis – trumpet (8, 12)
  - Harry Kim – trumpet (8)
  - Michael Harris – trumpet (12)
  - Arranged by Tom Tom 84 (8, 12)
- The Vine Street Horns
  - Andrew Woolfolk – saxophones (13)
  - Arturo Velsaco – trombone (13)
  - Daniel Fornero – trumpet (13)
  - Harry Kim – trumpet (13), horn arrangements (13)
- L. Shankar – violins (15)
- Arif Mardin – orchestra conductor (7, 9), string arrangements (11)
- Anne Dudley – orchestra conductor (14)
- David Crosby – vocals (1)
- Philip Bailey – vocals (3)
- Alex Brown – backing vocals (8)
- Lynne Fiddmont – backing vocals (8)
- Marva King – backing vocals (8)
- Marilyn Martin – vocals (9)
- Amy Keys – backing vocals (13)
- Arnold McCuller – backing vocals (13)
- Peter Gabriel – backing vocals (16)
- Sting – backing vocals (16)
- Helen Terry – backing vocals (16)

=== Additional credits ===
- Chris Blair – mastering at Abbey Road Studios (London, UK)
- David Costa – art direction, design
- Janfranco Caro – art direction, design, illustrations

== Charts ==
=== Weekly charts ===
Weekly chart performance for Hits
Chart (1998)	Peak position
Australian Albums (ARIA)	2
Austrian Albums (Ö3 Austria)	2
Belgian Albums (Ultratop Flanders)	4
Belgian Albums (Ultratop Wallonia)	1
Canada Top Albums/CDs (RPM)	1
Danish Albums (Tracklisten)	1
Dutch Albums (Album Top 100)	1
Estonian Albums (Eesti Top 10)	2
European Albums (Music & Media)	1
Finnish Albums (Suomen virallinen lista)	1
German Albums (Offizielle Top 100)	2
Hungarian Albums (MAHASZ)	33
Italian Albums (FIMI)	3
Japanese Albums (Oricon)	5
Malaysian Albums (IFPI)	6
New Zealand Albums (RMNZ)	1
Norwegian Albums (VG-lista)	2
Portuguese Albums (AFP)	4
Scottish Albums (Official Charts)	1
Singapore Albums (SPVA)	1
Spanish Albums (AFYVE)	3
Swedish Albums (Sverigetopplistan)	1
Swiss Albums (Schweizer Hitparade)	2
UK Albums (Official Charts)	1
US Billboard 200	6
Chart (2002)	Peak position
Irish Albums (IRMA)	12
Chart (2007)	Peak position
UK Album Downloads (Official Charts)	9
Chart (2013)	Peak position
French Albums (SNEP)	101

=== Year-end charts ===
1998 year-end chart performance for Hits
Chart (1998)	Position
Australian Albums (ARIA)	15
Austrian Albums (Ö3 Austria)	22
Belgian Albums (Ultratop Flanders)	35
Belgian Albums (Ultratop Wallonia)	18
Canadian Albums (RPM)	46
Dutch Albums (Album Top 100)	23
European Top 100 Albums (Music & Media)	17
German Albums (Offizielle Top 100)	32
New Zealand Albums (RMNZ)	33
Swedish Albums (Sverigetopplistan)	11
UK Albums (OCC)	15

1999 year-end chart performance for Hits
Chart (1999)	Position
Belgian Albums (Ultratop Flanders)	100
Belgian Albums (Ultratop Wallonia)	51
Canadian Albums (RPM)	46
Danish Albums (Hitlisten)	88
Dutch Albums (MegaCharts)	60
European Albums (Music & Media)	48
German Albums (Offizielle Top 100)	50
UK Albums (OCC)	98
US Billboard 200	103

== Certifications ==
Certifications for Hits
Region	Certification	Certified units/sales
Argentina (CAPIF)	Platinum	60,000^{^}
Australia (ARIA)	6× Platinum	420,000^{^}
Austria (IFPI Austria)	Platinum	50,000^{*}
Belgium (BRMA)	4× Platinum	200,000^{*}
Brazil (Pro-Música Brasil)	Gold	100,000^{*}
Canada (Music Canada)	4× Platinum	400,000^{^}
Denmark (IFPI Danmark)	8× Platinum	160,000^{‡}
Finland (Musiikkituottajat)	Gold	32,143
France (SNEP)	2× Platinum	600,000^{*}
Germany (BVMI)	3× Gold	750,000^{^}
Italy (FIMI) sales since 2009	Gold	30,000^{*}
Japan (RIAJ)	2× Platinum	400,000^{^}
Netherlands (NVPI)	Platinum	100,000^{^}
New Zealand (RMNZ)	3× Platinum	45,000^{^}
Norway (IFPI Norway)	Platinum	50,000^{*}
Spain (Promusicae)	2× Platinum	200,000^{^}
Sweden (GLF)	Platinum	80,000^{^}
Switzerland (IFPI Switzerland)	Platinum	50,000^{^}
United Kingdom (BPI)	6× Platinum	1,800,000^{*}
United States (RIAA)	3× Platinum	3,000,000^{^}
Summaries
Europe (IFPI)	5× Platinum	5,000,000^{*}
^{*} Sales figures based on certification alone.^{^} Shipments figures based on certification alone.^{‡} Sales+streaming figures based on certification alone.
