= Love Songs: A Compilation... Old and New =

Compilation album by Phil Collins
- Released: 28 September 2004
- Recorded: 1980–2004
- Genre: Pop; pop rock
- Length: 105:28
- Label: Face Value; Virgin
- Producer: Phil Collins, Hugh Padgham, Arif Mardin, Anne Dudley, Rob Cavallo, Nick Davis, David Pack, Lamont Dozier, Robert Colby
- Compiler: Geoff Callingham

Phil Collins chronology
The Platinum Collection (2004)	Love Songs: A Compilation... Old and New (2004)	Going Back (2010)

Professional ratings
Review scores
Source	Rating
AllMusic	3/5 stars

Love Songs: A Compilation... Old and New is a compilation album by the English musician Phil Collins. The album was released by Atlantic Recording Corporation and Rhino Entertainment on 28 September 2004 in the US and 1 November in Collins' native UK. The album was released only a few months after Collins' previous compilation album The Platinum Collection.

The album was compiled of recordings released on previous albums as well as several previously unreleased songs, including a rehearsal take and live recordings.

== Background, compilation and songs ==
The concept of Love Songs had existed since 2000. In that year, Collins and producer Rob Cavallo recorded the songs "Can't Stop Loving You," "Tears of a Clown" and "Least You Can Do" for inclusion in the compilation. However, the album did not see release and the songs were remixed and included on the 2002 studio album, Testify.

The songs on Love Songs were compiled by Geoff Callingham with the track listing being approved by Phil Collins. Several of the recordings—"I've Forgotten Everything," "This Must Be Love," —on the album were sped-up by several beats per minute, while none of the songs were remixed from their original albums. In 2005 a special valentine edition was released which features a bonus DVD with promo videos.

== Track listing ==
All tracks are written by Phil Collins, except where noted.

Disc one
No.	Title	Writer(s)	Original album	Length
1.	"Tearing and Breaking"	John Martyn; Collins	Previously unreleased	5:32
2.	"Do You Remember?"		...But Seriously (1989)	4:36
3.	"One More Night" (remix)		No Jacket Required (1985)	4:49
4.	"Against All Odds (Take a Look at Me Now)"		Against All Odds (1984)	3:28
5.	"Can't Turn Back the Years"		Both Sides (1993)	4:38
6.	"A Groovy Kind of Love"	Toni Wine; Carole Bayer Sager	Buster (1988)	3:29
7.	"Everyday"		Both Sides (1993)	5:42
8.	"Don't Let Him Steal Your Heart Away"		Hello, I Must Be Going! (1982)	4:46
9.	"Please Come Out Tonight"		Both Sides (1993)	5:47
10.	"This Must Be Love"		Face Value (1981)	3:36
11.	"It's in Your Eyes"		Dance into the Light (1996)	3:03
12.	"Can't Stop Loving You"	Billy Nicholls	Testify (2002)	4:18

Disc two
No.	Title	Writer(s)	Original album	Length
1.	"Testify"		Testify (2002)	6:31
2.	"True Colors" (rehearsal)	Billy Steinberg; Tom Kelly	Hits (1998)	5:32
3.	"You'll Be in My Heart"		Tarzan (1999)	4:17
4.	"If Leaving Me Is Easy"		Face Value (1981)	4:55
5.	"I've Been Trying"	Curtis Mayfield	A Tribute to Curtis Mayfield (1994)	5:00
6.	"I've Forgotten Everything"		Both Sides (1993)	4:36
7.	"Somewhere"	Stephen Sondheim; Leonard Bernstein	The Songs of West Side Story (1996)	4:01
8.	"The Least You Can Do" (remix)	Collins; Daryl Stuermer	Testify (2002)	5:04
9.	"Two Hearts"	Collins; Lamont Dozier	Buster (1988)	3:24
10.	"Separate Lives" (live)	Stephen Bishop	Serious Hits... Live! (1990)	5:18
11.	"My Girl" (live)	Smokey Robinson	Live from the Board (1995)	3:49
12.	"Always" (live)	Irving Berlin	"Both Sides of the Story" B-side (1993)	4:37
13.	"The Way You Look Tonight" (live)	Dorothy Fields; Jerome Kern	Previously unreleased	4:04

== Charts and certifications ==
=== Weekly charts ===
Chart (2004–2007)	Peak position
Australian Albums (ARIA)	37
Austrian Albums (Ö3 Austria)	4
Belgian Albums (Ultratop Flanders)	6
Belgian Albums (Ultratop Wallonia)	2
Canadian Albums (Billboard)	9
Danish Albums (Hitlisten)	2
Dutch Albums (Album Top 100)	6
European Albums (Billboard)	5
French Compilations (SNEP)	1
German Albums (Offizielle Top 100)	8
Irish Albums (IRMA)	4
Italian Albums (FIMI)	9
Norwegian Albums (VG-lista)	13
Polish Albums (ZPAV)	32
Portuguese Albums (AFP)	1
Scottish Albums (OCC)	10
Singaporean Albums (RIAS)	8
Spanish Albums (Promusicae)	86
Swedish Albums (Sverigetopplistan)	7
Swiss Albums (Schweizer Hitparade)	2
Taiwanese Albums (Five Music)	7
UK Albums (OCC)	7
US Billboard 200	51

=== Year-end charts ===
Chart (2004)	Position
Austrian Albums (Ö3 Austria)	43
Belgian Albums (Ultratop Flanders)	50
Belgian Albums (Ultratop Wallonia)	24
Dutch Albums (Album Top 100)	46
German Albums (Offizielle Top 100)	73
Swedish Albums (Sverigetopplistan)	97
Swiss Albums (Schweizer Hitparade)	16
UK Albums (OCC)	39

Chart (2005)	Position
Dutch Albums (Album Top 100)	88
Swiss Albums (Schweizer Hitparade)	75
UK Albums (OCC)	102

Chart (2007)	Position
UK Albums (OCC)	181

=== Certifications ===
Region	Certification	Certified units/sales
Austria (IFPI Austria)	Gold	15,000^{*}
Belgium (BRMA)	Gold	25,000^{*}
Brazil (Pro-Música Brasil)	Gold	50,000^{*}
Canada (Music Canada)	Platinum	100,000^{^}
Denmark (IFPI Danmark)	Platinum	40,000^{^}
France (SNEP)	2× Gold	200,000^{*}
Germany (BVMI)	3× Gold	300,000^{^}
Ireland (IRMA)	Platinum	15,000^{^}
Portugal (AFP)	2× Platinum	80,000^{^}
Switzerland (IFPI Switzerland)	Platinum	40,000^{^}
United Kingdom (BPI)	2× Platinum	600,000^{^}
United States (RIAA)	Gold	250,000^{^}
Summaries
Europe (IFPI)	Platinum	1,000,000^{*}
^{*} Sales figures based on certification alone.^{^} Shipments figures based on certification alone.
