= Urban Renewal (tribute album) =

2001 studio album by various artists

Studio album by Various artists
- Released: February 2001
- Genre: R&B/hip hop
- Label: WEA

Singles from Urban Renewal
- 1. "Another Day in Paradise" Released: March 2001; 2. "In the Air Tonite" Released: August 2001; 3. "Something Happened on the Way to Heaven" Released: November 2003

Urban Renewal is a tribute album to singer Phil Collins, released in February 2001 in most European markets and in the United States on 25 February 2003, containing remakes of his songs by R&B and hip hop performers. Collins remarked:

"We all think black R&B artists know what they're talking about. The first time I was aware of it was when I watched a documentary on Ice-T. This smug UK journalist looking at his record collection said, 'What's with all the Phil Collins stuff?' He said, 'Don't mess with my Phil.' I remember thinking, 'My God!' You feel like ringing people up and saying, 'Are you watching this?!'"

Although the album itself was not a worldwide success, only charting in Germany at number three, individual singles from the album performed well in various markets, including "Another Day in Paradise" as performed by Brandy and Ray J and "In the Air Tonite" as performed by rapper Lil' Kim. A remake by Deborah Cox, "Something Happened on the Way to Heaven", was later released as a dance remix on her 2003 album, Remixed. It reached number one on the Billboard Dance Radio Airplay chart and peaked at 95 on the Billboard Hot 100.

== Critical reception ==
The chief pop and rock critic of The Guardian, Alexis Petridis, described it as a "horrid and inexplicable album of hip-hop and R&B covers" with the "solitary redeeming track" being the version of "Sussudio". In 2006, Q magazine listed Urban Renewal as No. 3 in their list of the 50 worst albums ever.

== Track listing ==
Urban Renewal – Standard edition
No.	Title	Performer(s)	Length
1.	"Ray J Prelude"	Ray J	0:40
2.	"Another Day in Paradise"	Brandy and Ray J	4:29
3.	"Sussudio"	Ol' Dirty Bastard	4:20
4.	"Something Happened on the Way to Heaven"	Deborah Cox	4:31
5.	"This Must Be Love"	Dane Bowers featuring Kelis	3:34
6.	"In the Air Tonite"	Lil' Kim featuring Phil Collins	4:23
7.	"Gotta Hold Over Me"	Coko	4:05
8.	"I Don't Care Anymore" (Produced by The Neptunes)	Kelis featuring Pharrell	3:50
9.	"Can't Turn Back the Years"	Joe	4:38
10.	"Do You Remember?"	Debelah Morgan	4:11
11.	"Against All Odds"	Montell Jordan	4:18
12.	"One More Night"	Changing Faces	4:36
13.	"All of My Life"	TQ	4:28
14.	"I Wish It Would Rain Down"	Brian McKnight and Monique S.V.	4:10
15.	"Take Me Home"	Malik Pendleton	4:34
Total length:			60:01

Urban Renewal – Japanese deluxe edition (bonus tracks)
No.	Title	Performer(s)	Length
16.	"Separate Lives"	Chico DeBarge	4:08
17.	"Long Long Way to Go"	Tony Rich Project	5:01
18.	"Another Day in Paradise" (Black Legend VS. J-Reverse Club Mix)"	Brandy and Ray J	4:22
Total length:			1:14:05

== Charts ==
=== Weekly charts ===
Chart (2001)	Peak position
Austrian Albums (Ö3 Austria)	24
Belgian Albums (Ultratop Flanders)	50
French Albums (SNEP)	22
German Albums (Offizielle Top 100)	3
New Zealand Albums (RMNZ)	47
Swiss Albums (Schweizer Hitparade)	17
UK Compilation Albums (OCC)	16
UK R&B Albums (OCC)	4

=== Year-end charts ===
Chart (2001)	Position
German Albums (Offizielle Top 100)	72
