= Hang in Long Enough =

Single by Phil Collins

from the album ...But Seriously
- B-side: "Around the World in 80 Presets" (UK); "Separate Lives" (Live) (US)
- Released: 17 September 1990 (UK)
- Genre: Funk rock
- Length: 4:44
- Label: Atlantic; Virgin; WEA
- Songwriter: Phil Collins
- Producers: Phil Collins; Hugh Padgham

Phil Collins singles chronology
"That's Just the Way It Is" (1990)	"Hang in Long Enough" (1990)	"Who Said I Would" (1991)

Music video
- "Hang in Long Enough" on YouTube

"Hang in Long Enough" is a song performed by Phil Collins and released in September 1990 as the final single from the album ...But Seriously. The single reached No. 23 on the US Billboard Hot 100, No. 34 on the UK Singles Chart, and No. 9 in Canada.

== Formats and track listings ==
=== CD Maxi ===
1. Hang in Long Enough – 4:48
2. Around the World in 80 Presets – 5:46
3. Hang in Long Enough (Pettibone 12" Mix) – 7:57

=== CD Maxi Limited Edition ===
1. Hang in Long Enough – 4:47
2. That's How I Feel – 5:07
3. Hang in Long Enough (Pettibone Dub Mix) – 6:09

=== 12" single ===
Side A

1. Hang in Long Enough (Club Mix) – 7:57

Side B

1. Hang in Long Enough (Pop Club Mix) – 7:07
2. Hang in Long Enough (Dub 1) – 5:03

== Music video ==
The video, another one by Collins's frequent collaborators (director) Jim Yukich and (producer) Paul Flattery, sets Phil's modern band on an ill fated Titanic-like liner. It used stock footage from the movie A Night to Remember about the ship's sinking to link it with the song's storyline.

However, the ship is mentioned as the S. S. Udio (a humorous reference to the song "Sussudio") by the host at the start. Then, the Phenix Horns start playing the initial melody and Collins appears on stage to perform the whole song while the audience becomes shocked by the set design and the musicians' costumes. Throughout the video Collins and the musicians (and the stage they are on) are shown in bright, vivid color film, while everything else is in black and white - even in the same frame.

Throughout the song, Phil Collins appears to indicate his band to lower their volume. At the second verse of "Hang in Long Enough", the S. S. Udio starts sinking as the band's loud music rattles bolts free and water starts to come into the ship. As the song closes, the band and the audience try to escape to the boats while Collins stays on the stage to end the song with a guitar solo. The ship sinks into the ocean, but Collins and his band escape on a lifeboat - which also has the dog from the "Something Happened on the Way to Heaven" video. Phil laments "I told you, you was playing too loud", then the band sinks his head into the water as they watch the S. S. Udio vanishing.

== Personnel ==
- Phil Collins – keyboards, drums, vocals
- Daryl Stuermer – guitars
- Dominic Miller – guitars
- Nathan East – bass
- The Phenix Horns
  - Don Myrick – saxophone
  - Louis Satterfield – trombone
  - Harry Kim – trumpet
  - Rhamlee Michael Davis – trumpet
- Alex Brown – backing vocals
- Lynne Fiddmont – backing vocals
- Marva King – backing vocals
- Arranged by Tom Tom 84

== Charts ==
=== Weekly charts ===
Chart (1990–1991)	Peak position
Canada Top Singles (RPM)	9
Europe (Eurochart Hot 100)	93
Ireland (Irish Singles Chart)	27
UK Singles (Official Charts)	34
UK Airplay (Music & Media)	2
US Billboard Hot 100	23
US Adult Contemporary (Billboard)	38
US Dance Club Songs (Billboard)	29
US Cash Box Top 100	11

=== Year-end charts ===
Chart (1991)	Position
Canada Top Singles (RPM)	92
