= Serious Hits... Live! =

1990 live album by Phil Collins

Live album by Phil Collins
- Released: 29 October 1990
- Recorded: 1990
- Venues: Waldbühne, Berlin (Seriously Live in Berlin) various venues (Serious Hits Live)
- Genre: Pop rock
- Length: 76:53 (CD); 161:04 (Seriously Live In Berlin)
- Labels: Virgin, Atlantic
- Director: Jim Yukich
- Producers: Phil Collins; Robert Colby

Phil Collins chronology
...But Seriously (1989)	Serious Hits... Live! (1990)	Both Sides (1993)

Singles from Serious Hits... Live!
- 1. "Do You Remember?" Released: November 1990 (EU); 2. "Who Said I Would" Released: February 1991 (US)

Serious Hits... Live! is a live album by English singer-songwriter Phil Collins, released on vinyl, cassette, and CD on 5 November 1990. It is also the title of the 2003 DVD video release of his concert at Berlin's Waldbühne on 15 July 1990. (The original 1990 VHS and Laserdisc version of the video was titled Seriously Live and released several days earlier, on 29 October.) The songs on the CD version are taken from various concerts during the Seriously, Live! World Tour. At the Brit Awards in 1992, the album earned Collins a nomination for British Male Artist.

Two singles were released from this album, being "Do You Remember?" and "Who Said I Would", a song originally released for his third studio album No Jacket Required.

== History ==
When compiling the tracks for the album, instead of providing the experience of a complete live concert, the producers took the approach of putting together a "hits only" selection of songs. On the final song of the album, Collins thanks the fans in Chicago.

The live video and DVD version features one entire concert. The live performance at Berlin's Waldbühne has been hailed by Collins as his best performance due to the energy of the German people after the fall of the Berlin Wall. The DVD presents an in-depth look at his solo concert experience. Special moments include the crowd not allowing the concert to continue with prolonged applause after "Something Happened on the Way to Heaven" and the lighter vigil during "Doesn't Anybody Stay Together Anymore".

== Critical reception ==
- AllMusic link

== Track listing ==
=== Original 1990 LP ===
All tracks are written by Phil Collins, except where noted.

Side one
No.	Title	Writer(s)	Length
1.	"Something Happened on the Way to Heaven"	Collins; Daryl Stuermer	4:59
2.	"Against All Odds (Take a Look at Me Now)"		3:28
3.	"Who Said I Would"		4:28
4.	"One More Night"		5:49

Side two
No.	Title	Writer(s)	Length
5.	"Don't Lose My Number"		4:42
6.	"Do You Remember?"		5:40
7.	"Another Day in Paradise"		5:36
8.	"Separate Lives"	Stephen Bishop	5:16

Side three
No.	Title	Writer(s)	Length
1.	"In the Air Tonight"		6:35
2.	"You Can't Hurry Love"	Holland–Dozier–Holland	2:54
3.	"Two Hearts"	Collins, Lamont Dozier	3:07
4.	"Sussudio"		7:14

Side four
No.	Title	Writer(s)	Length
5.	"A Groovy Kind of Love"	Carole Bayer Sager, Toni Wine	3:30
6.	"Easy Lover"	Philip Bailey, Collins, Nathan East	4:46
7.	"Take Me Home"		8:39

== DVD track listing ==
1. "Hand in Hand"
2. "Hang in Long Enough"
3. "Against All Odds (Take a Look at Me Now)"
4. "Don't Lose My Number"
5. "Inside Out"
6. "Do You Remember?"
7. "Who Said I Would"
8. "Another Day in Paradise"
9. "Separate Lives"
10. "Saturday Night and Sunday Morning"/"The West Side"
11. "That's Just the Way It Is"
12. "Something Happened on the Way to Heaven"
13. "Doesn't Anybody Stay Together Anymore"
14. "One More Night"
15. "Colours"
16. "In the Air Tonight"
17. Band Introductions
18. "You Can't Hurry Love"
19. "Two Hearts"
20. "Sussudio"
21. "A Groovy Kind of Love"
22. "Easy Lover"
23. "Always"
24. "Take Me Home"

The version of "Doesn't Anybody Stay Together Anymore" performed on the Serious Hits… Live! recording differs considerably from the original version on the album No Jacket Required, having been re-arranged into a ballad.

== Personnel ==
=== The Serious Guys ===
- Phil Collins – vocals, electric grand piano, synthesizer, drums
- Brad Cole – keyboards
- Daryl Stuermer – guitars
- Leland Sklar – bass
- Chester Thompson – drums

=== The Seriousettes ===
- Bridgette Bryant – vocals
- Arnold McCuller – vocals
- Fred White – vocals

=== The Phenix Horns ===
- Don Myrick – alto saxophone
- Louis "Lui Lui" Satterfield – trombone
- Rahmlee Michael Davis – trumpet
- Harry Kim – trumpet

== Production ==
- Directed by Jim Yukich
- Produced by Paul Flattery and Tony Smith
- Audio Produced by Phil Collins and Robert Colby
- Engineered by Paul Gomersall
- Mixed by Paul Gomersall and Robert Colby
- Remixed at The Farm, Townhouse Studios and Great Linford Manor (England, UK); The Power Station (New York, NY); A&M Studios (Los Angeles, CA).
- Design – Phil Collins and Wherefore Art?
- Photography – Lewis Lee

== Charts ==
=== Weekly charts ===
Chart performance for Serious Hits... Live!
Chart (1990–2019)	Peak position
Australian Albums (ARIA)	5
Austrian Albums (Ö3 Austria)	2
Belgian Albums (BEA)	3
Canadian Albums (RPM)	6
Danish Albums (IFPI)	4
Dutch Albums (Album Top 100)	1
European Albums (IFPI)	1
Finnish Albums (Suomen virallinen lista)	4
Finnish Music DVD (Suomen virallinen lista)	7
French Albums (IFOP)	2
German Albums (Offizielle Top 100)	1
Greek Albums (IFPI)	7
Hungarian Albums (MAHASZ)	4
Irish Albums (IRMA)	2
Italian Albums (AFI)	3
Japanese Albums (Oricon)	7
New Zealand Albums (RMNZ)	2
New Zealand Music DVD (RMNZ)	1
Norwegian Albums (VG-lista)	9
Portuguese Albums (AFP)	2
Spanish Albums (AFYVE)	6
Swedish Albums (Sverigetopplistan)	16
Swiss Albums (Schweizer Hitparade)	2
UK Albums (Official Charts)	2
US Billboard 200	11
US Top Album Sales (Billboard)	66
US Top Current Album Sales (Billboard)	11
US Cashbox Top 100 Albums	6

=== Year-end charts ===
Year-end chart performance for Serious Hits... Live!
Chart (1990)	Position
Dutch Albums (Album Top 100)	22
Japanese Albums (Oricon)	75
New Zealand Albums (RMNZ)	32
Norwegian Albums (VG-lista)	63
Spanish Albums (AFYVE)	84
Swiss Albums (Schweizer Hitparade)	104

Chart (1991)	Position
Australian Albums (ARIA)	27
Dutch Albums (Album Top 100)	6
German Albums (Offizielle Top 100)	3
New Zealand Albums (RMNZ)	21
Norwegian Albums (VG-lista)	83
Spanish Albums (AFYVE)	19
Swiss Albums (Schweizer Hitparade)	9

== Certifications ==
=== Album ===
Certifications for Serious Hits... Live!
Region	Certification	Certified units/sales
Argentina (CAPIF)	5× Platinum	300,000^{^}
Australia (ARIA)	3× Platinum	210,000^{^}
Austria (IFPI Austria)	Platinum	50,000^{*}
Brazil (Pro-Música Brasil)	3× Platinum	750,000^{*}
Canada (Music Canada)	2× Platinum	200,000^{^}
Finland (Musiikkituottajat)	Gold	41,520
France (SNEP)	Diamond	1,000,000^{*}
Germany (BVMI)	3× Platinum	1,500,000^{^}
Italy (FIMI)	6× Platinum	600,000^{*}
Japan (RIAJ)	Gold	300,000
Netherlands (NVPI)	Platinum	100,000^{^}
New Zealand (RMNZ)	7× Platinum	105,000^{^}
Portugal (AFP)	Platinum	40,000^{^}
Spain (Promusicae)	2× Platinum	200,000^{^}
Switzerland (IFPI Switzerland)	3× Platinum	150,000^{^}
United Kingdom (BPI)	4× Platinum	1,200,000^{^}
United States (RIAA)	4× Platinum	4,000,000^{^}
Summaries
Europe (IFPI)	5× Platinum	5,000,000^{*}
^{*} Sales figures based on certification alone.^{^} Shipments figures based on certification alone.

=== Video ===
Certifications for Serious Hits... Live! video
Region	Certification	Certified units/sales
Argentina (CAPIF)	6× Platinum	48,000^{^}
Australia (ARIA)	Gold	7,500^{^}
Brazil (Pro-Música Brasil)	Platinum	50,000^{*}
Germany (BVMI)	Platinum	50,000^{^}
Netherlands (NVPI)	Gold	40,000^{^}
New Zealand (RMNZ)	Gold	2,500^{^}
Portugal (AFP)	Platinum	8,000^{^}
United States (RIAA)	Platinum	100,000^{^}
^{*} Sales figures based on certification alone.^{^} Shipments figures based on certification alone.

== See also ==
- Philip Collins Ltd v Davis [2000] 3 All ER 808
- List of best-selling albums in Argentina
- List of best-selling albums in Brazil
- List of best-selling albums in France
- List of best-selling albums in Germany
