= Always (Irving Berlin song) =

1925 song written and composed by Irving Berlin

- Sheet music, 1925

Song
- Written: 1925
- Published: 1925 by Irving Berlin, Inc.
- Genre: Traditional Pop
- Songwriter: Irving Berlin

"Always" is a popular song written by Irving Berlin in 1925, as a wedding gift for his wife Ellin Mackay, whom he married in 1926, and to whom he presented the substantial royalties.

== Background ==
Although legend (and Groucho Marx) claimed Berlin wrote the song "Always" for The Cocoanuts, he never meant the song to be included in that musical, and it was not. Thematically, it serves as a sequel to Berlin's earlier song "When I Lost You," which pertained to the death of his first wife Dorothy.

The song entered into the public domain on January 1, 2021. In June 2026, CBS News included the song in its list of the 250 essential American songs of the past 250 years.

== Lyrics ==
The song featured at the end of Lonesome (1928)

Everything went wrong,
And the whole day long
I'd feel so blue.
For the longest while
I'd forget to smile,
Then I met you.
Now that my blue days have passed,
Now that I've found you at last -

I'll be loving you Always
With a love that's true Always.
When the things you've planned
Need a helping hand,
I will understand
Always.
Always.

Days may not be fair Always,
That's when I'll be there Always.
Not for just an hour,
Not for just a day,
Not for just a year,
But Always.

== Popular culture ==
- The song is an important plot element in Noël Coward's play Blithe Spirit.
- It also features in the 1944 film Christmas Holiday, in which it is sung by Deanna Durbin.
- The song is featured in the 1942 Lou Gehrig biopic The Pride of the Yankees, starring Gary Cooper and Teresa Wright. During a nightclub scene, it's played by Ray Noble and His Orchestra and sung by Bettye Avery.
- An instrumental version of the song is used as a frequent background theme for episodes of Jackie Gleason's TV series, The Honeymooners (1955-56).
- Country singer Patsy Cline's version was posthumously released as a single in 1980 and peaked at number 18 on the Billboard Hot Country Songs chart. In June 2026, CBS News included the song in its list of the 250 essential American songs of the past 250 years, one of two Cline songs to be included on the list.
- In the 1980 "Father and Daughter Night" episode of Archie Bunker's Place, Stephanie, Archie, and Murray perform the song.
- Lynda Carter would close her primetime TV specials performing the song.
- Phil Collins covered the song in the closing encore during his 1990 Seriously Live! World Tour. The live version of the song was later released as a B-side of the single "Both Sides of the Story", and also included on his 2004 compilation album Love Songs: A Compilation... Old and New and as a bonus track on his 2016 remastered re-release of ...But Seriously.
