= The Lightyears =

UK musical group

- Origin: London, England, UK
- Genres: Pop rock, rock, progressive rock, power pop
- Years active: 2003 - present
- Label: Independent
- Members: George Owens; Chris Russell; John Owens; Tony Lyons; Jack Bourne; Danny Morriss
- Website: http://www.thelightyears.com

The Lightyears are an English five-piece pop-rock band based in London, England, comprising George Owens (lead vocals and guitar), Chris Russell (vocals and piano), John Owens (bass), Tony Lyons (vocals and drums) and Jack Bourne (lead guitar). Sound engineer Danny Morriss is also a permanent member. Though The Lightyears formed in 2003, Russell and Owens have been playing and writing together since the age of 13.

Philadelphia-based radio station WXPN have described the band as "the bastard pop-child of The La's and Wham!".

== Awards and achievements ==
In 2007, The Lightyears won "Best Pop/Rock Act" at the first-ever INDY Awards ceremony at the Clapham Grand, which prompted the London Metro to write that they were "being widely touted as Next Big Things". The band were nominated again the following year, this time for "Best Pop Act". In light of these accolades, the record producer Hugh Padgham asked the band into his studio to record a selection of tracks. Two of these recordings, "Emily" and "Sleepless", feature on The Lightyears' 2009 album London, England.

== Press ==
BBC Oxford have called the band "incredibly talented", and South African rugby player Robbie Fleck, interviewed at CapeTownTens.com, described The Lightyears' headline show in Cape Town as "without doubt the best party I have ever been to in my life". In the US, PlayPhilly.com wrote "I haven't been this excited about British pop since I discovered The Beatles. The Lightyears, simply put, are incredible".

== Tours and appearances ==
The Lightyears have toured to the US, South Korea, Thailand, South Africa and mainland Europe. They played Glastonbury Festival in both 2007 and 2008 and have supported acts such as Mystery Jets and The Levellers. In September 2009, the band performed at Wembley Stadium to a crowd of 45,000 people. They appeared on the same bill as Diversity, winners of Britain's Got Talent. Three further performances at Wembley were to follow, supporting acts such as Right Said Fred and Eliza Doolittle.

In November 2009, The Lightyears appeared in a national advertising campaign for T-Mobile. Chris and George wrote a song for the campaign (in collaboration with Josh's Band) called "Come With Me", which was released in January 2010 on Universal Records.

In March 2011, The Lightyears were invited to perform at The Script's headline show at O2 Arena, appearing in the O2 blueroom.

In October 2012, the band travelled to Gothenburg, Sweden, to perform with Roger Daltrey from The Who and Roger Taylor from Queen. In 2013, after a sell-out show at Westminster Reference Library and an American tour, the band shifted their focus to private events for the remainder of the decade.

During the first half of the 2020s, The Lightyears devised a concept show for the festival circuit called Hype Club. Hype Club, a high-energy DJ set fronted by a rock band, debuted at Sham Rocks Festival and Guildford's ShyneFest in May 2026.

== Lightyears novel ==
In 2009, Chris Russell began work on his debut novel Mockstars, inspired by the story of how The Lightyears got together. He was signed to leading literary agency Johnson & Alcock in November 2013 and Mockstars was published the following summer by Red Button Publishing. Russell then began work on a trilogy of teen novels entitled "Songs About A Girl", in which an ordinary teenage girl is invited to take backstage photos for the world's hottest boy band. The trilogy was bought by Hodder Children's in 2015 and sold in multiple territories worldwide.

== Discography ==
=== Albums ===
- Mission Creep (December 2005)
- London, England (January 2009)

=== EPs ===
- "The Last Men On Earth" (January 2003)
- "Rumour Going Round" (August 2004)
- "Phoenix" (July 2006)
- "At Midnight" (September 2008)
