= Jam Tronik =

German eurodance group

Jam Tronik was a German Eurodance group which consisted of Anja Lukaseder (also known as Nikita Warren), Ulrich Fischer and Volkmar Kalff. Charlie Glass was the founder and producer of the project. The group released dance cover versions, several of which were hits in Europe. They were signed to ZYX Music.

Their first single, in 1989, was a cover version of the Phil Collins hit "Another Day in Paradise", and was a top 20 hit in Germany and the United Kingdom in 1990. A cover version of Meat Loaf's "I'd Do Anything for Love" was a top 20 hit Austria in 1994.

The 1993 release "Bee G-Esque" contained four cover versions of Bee Gees songs: "Staying Alive", "Tragedy", "How Deep Is Your Love" and "Jive Talking".

== Discography ==
=== Compilation albums ===
- 1993: Best Of...
- 2008: The Very Best Of
- 2010: Complete Hit Collection

=== Singles ===
- 1989: "Another Day in Paradise" - UK #19, GER #17, BEL #30
- 1991: "Yesterday Once More (Every Sha La La La)"
- 1992: "Stand by Me"
- 1992: "End of the Road"
- 1993: "Bee G-Esque" (four tracks: "Staying Alive", "Tragedy", "How Deep Is Your Love" and "Jive Talking")
- 1994: "I'd Do Anything for Love" - AUT #15
- 1994: "An Angel"
- 1994: "Without You"
- 1995: "Wish You Were Here"
- 1996: "Forever Love"
