= That's Just the Way It Is =

1990 single by Phil Collins

Single by Phil Collins

from the album ...But Seriously
- B-side: "Broadway Chorus"
- Released: 16 July 1990
- Length: 5:19
- Label: Virgin
- Songwriter: Phil Collins
- Producers: Phil Collins; Hugh Padgham

Phil Collins singles chronology
"Do You Remember?" (1990)	"That's Just the Way It Is" (1990)	"Hang in Long Enough" (1990)

Music video
- "That's Just the Way It Is" on YouTube

"That's Just the Way It Is" is a song by English musician Phil Collins, released as the fifth single from his fourth solo studio album, ...But Seriously (1989), in July 1990 by Virgin Records. The track features David Crosby on background vocals and is written by Collins and co-produced by him with Hugh Padgham. It was released as a single only in Europe, Australia and Japan, while "Do You Remember?" was instead released in the United States. The song reached number 26 in the UK Singles Chart.

The song, according to Collins, is an anti-war ballad that heavily deals with The Troubles of Northern Ireland. The song itself was positively received by most critics. The B-side to the song was "Broadway Chorus", the demo version of "Something Happened on the Way to Heaven".

== Song information ==
The song is an anti-war ballad, about the conflict in Northern Ireland, The Troubles. Phil Collins said of the song:

It's about Northern Ireland as far as I am concerned. Which in England we are used to it all the time, I mean Ireland of course, it's on the doorstep but everywhere else in the world it's... just another news report, but if you are living in England and you just sort of constantly [hear of] people getting blown to smithereens because this thing that's been going on for the last twenty—but also for a lot longer in Ireland, it's only just come to the front in the last twenty years. You see newsreels of kids throwing petrol bombs because their brothers throw them and then their dads throw them and their dad's dad and it's just bred, inbred, now this violence and I just thought someone somewhere, and it's got to be from both sides, has got to say "Hang on, life means more than this. This has got to stop."

David Crosby performs backing vocals on the song and duets with Collins several times. During live performances of the song, Collins would precede it with a monologue about what he thought were the "evils of war". The San Jose Mercury News criticized this, saying, "But instead of reinforcing his persona as rock's Good Old Bloke, it came across as a piece of show biz, as if he wasn't feeling it but simply reading it." The B-side of the single was "Broadway Chorus", a demo version of another hit single from the album, "Something Happened on the Way to Heaven".

== Reception ==
Don McLeese of The Chicago Sun-Times said that David Crosby was "used more effectively" on this song than any other song which had Crosby on the album. The Pittsburgh Post-Gazette however, said that the song was "so lyrically vague it lacked punch". Jon Pareles of The New York Times thought that the song "[echoed] Bruce Hornsby in tone and title". The San Jose Mercury News thought the song was "pretty". Lennox Samuels of The Dallas Morning News thought that the song "starts out as if it is going to be another "In the Air Tonight"..."before it moves into being an anti-war song". Meanwhile, The Atlanta Journal-Constitution thought that Crosby's vocals "lends challenging harmony".

== Track listing ==
1. "That's Just the Way It Is" – 5:19
2. "Broadway Chorus" ("Something Happened on the Way to Heaven" demo version) – 4:17
3. "In the Air Tonight" (extended version) – 7:35

== Personnel ==
- Phil Collins – keyboards, vocals, percussion
- David Crosby – background vocals
- Daryl Stuermer – guitars
- Leland Sklar – bass

== Charts ==
=== Weekly charts ===
Chart (1990)	Peak position
Belgium (Ultratop 50 Flanders)	19
Europe (Eurochart Hot 100)	58
Germany (GfK)	51
Ireland (IRMA)	5
Luxembourg (Radio Luxembourg)	10
Netherlands (Dutch Top 40)	10
Netherlands (Single Top 100)	13
Switzerland (Schweizer Hitparade)	29
UK Singles (Official Charts)	26
UK Airplay (Music & Media)	14
Zimbabwe (ZIMA)	9

=== Year-end charts ===
Chart (1990)	Position
Netherlands (Dutch Top 40)	95

== Release history ==
Region	Date	Format(s)	Label(s)	Ref.
United Kingdom	16 July 1990	7-inch vinyl; 12-inch vinyl; CD; cassette	Virgin	
Australia	30 July 1990	7-inch vinyl; cassette	WEA	
Japan	10 December 1990	Mini-CD	WEA	
