= I Missed Again =

Single by Phil Collins

from the album Face Value
- B-side: "I'm Not Moving"
- Released: 27 February 1981
- Recorded: August–October 1980
- Genre: R&B; soul-pop
- Length: 3:47
- Label: Virgin (UK); Atlantic (international)
- Songwriter: Phil Collins
- Producers: Phil Collins; Hugh Padgham

Phil Collins singles chronology
"In the Air Tonight" (1981)	"I Missed Again" (1981)	"If Leaving Me Is Easy" (1981)

Music video
- "I Missed Again" on YouTube

"I Missed Again" is a song from Phil Collins's debut solo studio album, Face Value (1981). It was selected as the lead single from the album in the US and Canada, although in most other countries "In the Air Tonight" was released as Collins' first solo single, followed by "I Missed Again". The song features a tenor sax solo from British jazz musician Ronnie Scott. The song peaked at No. 19 on the US Billboard Hot 100 chart in May 1981 and reached No. 14 in the UK.

== Background ==
Like many of the songs on Face Value, "I Missed Again" is about Collins's anger and frustration about his first wife leaving him. The original demo was entitled "I Miss You, Babe", with sadder lyrics – this demo version was later released as a B-side of "If Leaving Me Is Easy". He re-wrote the lyrics, gave the song a different tempo, and re-titled it "I Missed Again" in an effort to make it lighthearted instead of sad.

The primary backing track consisted of bass, drums, and piano. According to Hugh Padgham, who co-produced the song, he said that he "compressed the piano to death, it sounded so wide and it filled up everything; and we pulled it up in the mix. It sounds as if there's a lot going on, when in fact there isn't."

== Critical reception ==
Cashbox wrote that the song was Collins' "funkiest outing to date" and also commended the saxophone interlude from Ronnie Scott. Record World called it a "mid-tempo rocker [that] has R&B underpinnings, melodic pop keyboard currents, and Collins' easily identifiable light tenor."

== Music video ==
The song's music video features Collins on a white background singing and miming the various instruments. It was released on VHS in 1983. It received a Grammy nomination for Best Video, Short Form.

== Credits ==
1. "I Missed Again"
  - Phil Collins – vocals, piano, Prophet-5, drums
  - Daryl Stuermer – guitar
  - John Giblin – bass
  - The Phenix Horns:
    - Don Myrick – tenor saxophone
    - Louis Satterfield – trombone
    - Rahmlee Michael Davis – trumpet
    - Michael Harris – trumpet
  - Ronnie Scott – tenor sax solo
  - L. Shankar – violins
2. "I'm Not Moving"
  - Phil Collins – vocals, drums, percussion, piano, Prophet 5, Roland VP-330 vocoder
  - John Giblin – bass
- Gavin Cochrane – photography

== Charts ==
=== Weekly charts ===
Chart (1981)	Peak position
Australia (Kent Music Report)	88
Canada RPM Top Singles	6
Ireland	12
New Zealand	35
UK Singles (OCC)	14
UK Airplay (Record Business)	4
US Billboard Hot 100	19
US Cash Box Hot 100	19
US Mainstream Rock (Billboard)	8
West Germany (GfK)	23

=== Year-end charts ===
Chart (1981)	Rank
Canada	54
US (Joel Whitburn's Pop Annual)	119

== Popular culture ==
The song was featured in a late 1980s promotional commercial, which featured bloopers, by the National Basketball Association. It was also used in the early 1990s by the BBC in a montage of snooker players missing shots. Similarly, NBC Sunday Night Football played the song immediately after kicker Eddy Piñeiro missed the second of two field goals during the Chicago Bears' game against the Los Angeles Rams on 17 November 2019.
