= If Leaving Me Is Easy =

Single by Phil Collins

from the album Face Value
- B-side: "In the Air Tonight"; "I Missed Again"; "If Leaving Me Is Easy" (demo)
- Released: May 1981
- Recorded: 1980
- Length: 4:56
- Label: Virgin (UK); Atlantic (international)
- Songwriter: Phil Collins
- Producers: Phil Collins; Hugh Padgham

Phil Collins singles chronology
| "I Missed Again" (1981) | "If Leaving Me Is Easy" (1981) | "Thru These Walls" (1982) |

Audio
- "Phil Collins - If Leaving Me Is Easy (2016 Remaster)" on YouTube

"If Leaving Me Is Easy" is a song by Phil Collins from his 1981 album Face Value. Released as the third single from the album, it reached No. 17 in the UK, but was not released as a single in the United States. The song was also a top 40 hit in Ireland, reaching No. 25. Collins sings in a high falsetto in its chorus. The song was later covered by the Isley Brothers for their 1985 album Masterpiece.

The song features contributions from Eric Clapton, who according to Collins, recorded his parts after a few drinks of alcohol. Collins mentioned that he wished that Clapton had played more on "If Leaving Me Is Easy"; Clapton explained that he been hesitant about recording his parts over concerns that it would detract from the song.

== Live versions ==
Collins revealed on the "Making of Face Value" episode of Classic Albums that he decided to stop performing this song live on stage following his 1985 No Jacket Required tour because he disliked the audience yelling and screaming instead of being quiet while he performed this song. According to SongFacts.com, Collins performed the song on the BBC music show Top of the Pops with a bucket of paint and paintbrush on top of his electric piano, a reference to his first wife's affair with a painter and decorator.

== Charts ==
| Chart (1981) | Peak position |
|---|---|
| German Singles Chart | 61 |
| Irish Singles Chart | 25 |
| UK Singles (OCC) | 17 |
| UK Airplay (Record Business) | 11 |

== Personnel ==
- Phil Collins: Rhodes, drums, vocals, Prophet 5
- Eric Clapton: guitar
- Daryl Stuermer: guitar
- Alphonso Johnson: bass guitar
- Don Myrick: alto sax
- Rahmlee Michael Davis and Michael Harris: flugelhorns
- Strings arranged by Arif Mardin
- Gavin Cochrane: Photography
