= Shank Hall =

Concert venue in Milwaukee, Wisconsin

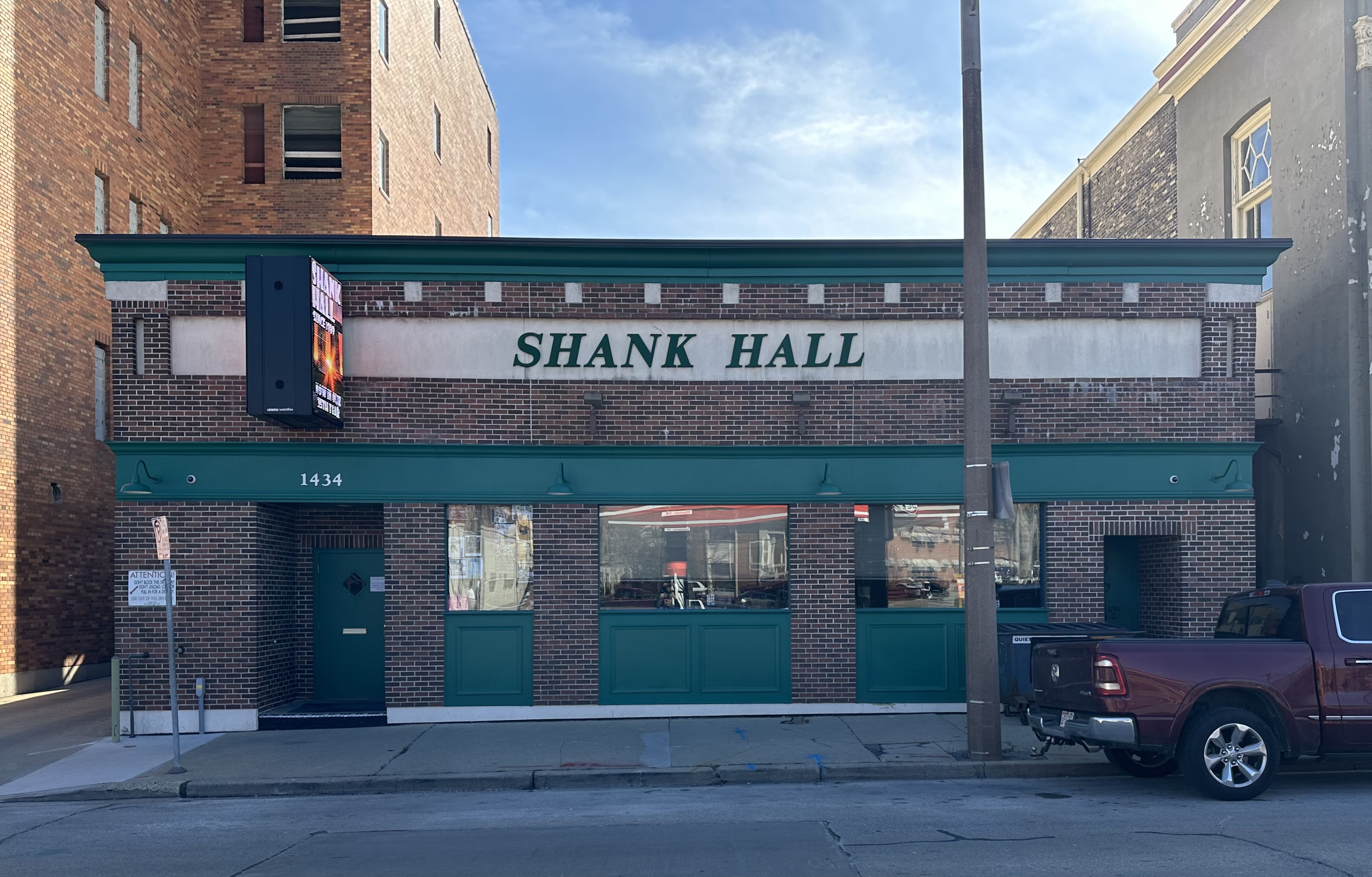
- Shank Hall 2024

- Location in Wisconsin Location in the United States
- Former names: Farwell Avenue Garage; The Funny Bone; The Barn; Teddy's
- Address: 1434 N. Farwell Avenue; Milwaukee; United States
- Coordinates: 43°02′55″N 87°53′46″W
- Owner: Peter Jest
- Seating type: General admission
- Capacity: 300
- Current use: Concert venue

Construction
- Built: 1930s
- Opened: November 3, 1989
- Renovated: 1992

Website
- shankhall.com

Shank Hall is a music venue with a 300-person capacity located in Milwaukee, Wisconsin, United States. It began as a garage in c.1930 to store and repair motor vehicles, and in the 1940s the building was a record distribution center. Later, it became a concert venue called The Barn, and in the 1970s, it was called Teddy's. In 1989, it became Shank Hall and was named after a fictional club in the movie This Is Spinal Tap.

== Background ==
The building is owned by Peter Jest, and it is a one-story brick building. There was a type of house in the back of the music venue which was likely built in 1920 according to the Wisconsin Historical Society. The building in the front which hosts music acts now was likely built in 1930s, and according to permits, it was used as a garage. In 1938, it was named Farwell Avenue Garage, and it was to store and repair motor vehicles. In 1947, offices were built at the front of the building and Capitol Records Distribution stored and distributed record albums from the location.

== History ==
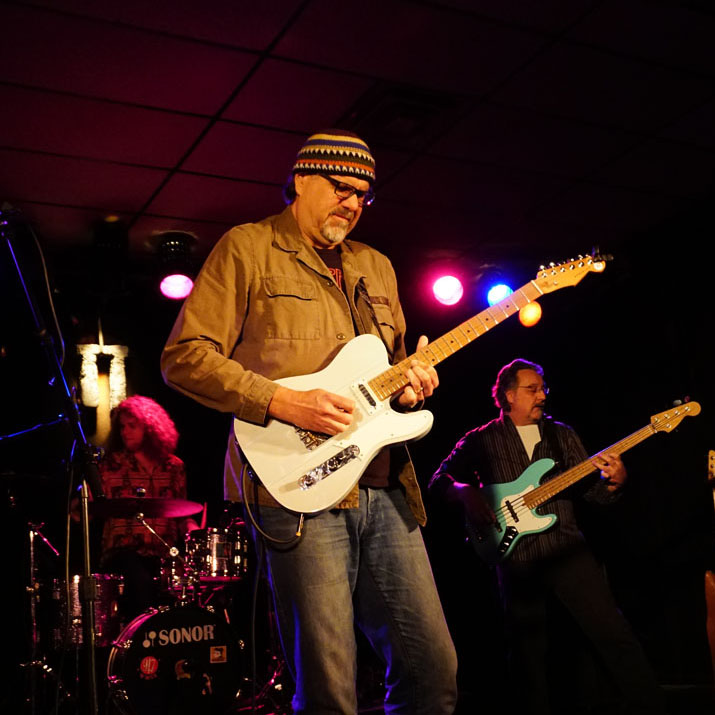
Greg Koch at Shank Hall March 16, 2019

In 1968, Tony Machi opened a business called The Barn and in the 1970s, the place hosted blues music concerts. In 1975, the business became a disco venue and took the name Teddy's. From 1984 to 1988, the business was called The Funny Bone. In 1989, Peter Jest began renting the building for use as a concert venue. The first act to play on November 3, 1989, was a Milwaukee cover band named Java. Jest claims that he named the venue Shank Hall in honor of the cult classic movie This Is Spinal Tap. In the movie, there is a fictitious Milwaukee club called Shank Hall. Jest purchased the building in 1999. The building had a fire on September 10, 1992, and after Jest had the club rebuilt, it had a capacity of 300.

In 2017, actor Corey Feldman knocked out one of his teeth after striking it on a microphone. He then looked for the tooth and found it with the assistance of a fan. Actor Kiefer Sutherland also performed at the club in 2016 and 2019. Some other performers who have played at Shank Hall include: No Doubt, The Smashing Pumpkins, Goo Goo Dolls, Jewel, and Sarah McLachlan.

In 2020, the club closed for most of the year as a result of the COVID-19 pandemic. They planned to open at 50% capacity but out of concern for the bands and concert goers, they delayed reopening until 2021. A digital marquee was installed in 2022 to replace the manually updated sign.
