= Do You Remember? (Phil Collins song) =

1990 single by Phil Collins

Single by Phil Collins

from the album ...But Seriously
- B-side: "I Wish It Would Rain Down" (demo) (US); "Against All Odds (Take a Look at Me Now)" (live) (UK)
- Released: April 1990 (studio); 26 November 1990 (live)
- Length: 4:36
- Label: Atlantic (US); Virgin (UK)
- Songwriter: Phil Collins
- Producers: Phil Collins; Hugh Padgham

Phil Collins singles chronology
"Something Happened on the Way to Heaven" (1990)	"Do You Remember?" (1990)	"That's Just the Way It Is" (1990)

Music videos
- "Do You Remember?" (studio version) on YouTube
- "Do You Remember?" (live version) on YouTube

"Do You Remember?" is a song by the English drummer and singer-songwriter Phil Collins. It was released in April 1990 as the fourth single from his fourth solo studio album, ...But Seriously (1989). It was produced by Collins and Hugh Padgham and features singer-songwriter Stephen Bishop on the track as a backing vocalist. The song had minor success in European countries but went to number one on both the Canadian and US Adult Contemporary charts. It also reached number one in Canada and peaked at number four on the US Billboard Hot 100 and number three on the US Cash Box Top 100, becoming his 14th and last top-ten hit.

A live performance of the song appears on the Serious Hits... Live! album. The live version was released as a single in Australia and Europe, where it reached number 57 on the UK Singles Chart and the top 30 in Belgium, France, Ireland and the Netherlands. Music videos were produced for both versions; a live version, using the Serious Hits... Live! album recording was published on Phil Collins' YouTube channel in June 2010 while the original video using the studio version was not published on his YouTube channel until July 2018.

The song's lyrics are from the perspective of a man whose relationship is failing, due to his lover's neglect. It was awarded a BMI Most Performed Song Award and one of BMI's Pop Awards in 1991, honoring the songwriters, composers and music publishers of the song. An instrumental cover performed by the Royal Philharmonic Orchestra was released later. It was extremely popular in Bulgaria during the early 1990s, due to a then-famous teenage TV program using it while showing its closing credits. The song was also featured in the United States Army aviation action movie Fire Birds starring Nicolas Cage and Sean Young.

== Music video ==
The music video for "Do You Remember?" opens on Collins finishing up performing the song in the recording studio when his engineer alerts him of a phone call. Collins picks up the phone amid a loud lightning and thunder storm, unable to hear the person on the other line. He then hears and sees a woman-like figure through a door calling for him. He opens the door and is blinded by a bright light and glass shattering, which presumably transports him back to his childhood and the video to black and white. The song begins to play as the childhood sequence, interspersed with the adult Collins singing to "Remember", tells the story of a young newspaper boy (played by Justin Wilmeth) becoming acquainted with a girl classmate (Carla Anderson). The two become romantically involved before the girl tells him that she is moving. As the two bid goodbye, the boy gives her his hat and watches despairingly as her and her family drive away. The video cuts back to exactly how it began, only this time Collins says to his engineer, "Can we take a message?"

== Critical reception ==
Gavin Report called the song, "A beautifully written and performed open letter to a closed mind."

== Formats and track listings ==
- 7-inch single
1. "Do You Remember?"
2. "I Wish It Would Rain Down" (demo)
- CD maxi
1. "Do You Remember?" (live)
2. "Against All Odds (Take a Look at Me Now)" (live)
3. "Doesn't Anybody Stay Together Anymore?" (live)
4. "Inside Out" (live)
- CD maxi - Caroussel boxset
1. "Do You Remember?" (live)
2. "Doesn't Anybody Stay Together Anymore?" (live)
3. "The Roof Is Leaking" (live)
- 7-inch single
1. "Do You Remember?" (live) – 5:47
2. "Against All Odds (Take a Look at Me Now)" (live) – 3:32
- 12-inch single
1. "Do You Remember?" (live) – 5:47
2. "Against All Odds (Take a Look at Me Now)" (live) – 3:32
3. "Doesn't Anybody Stay Together Anymore" (live) – 5:52

== Personnel ==
- Phil Collins – vocals, keyboards, percussion, drum machine (Roland TR-808)
- Daryl Stuermer – guitar
- Pino Palladino – bass
- Stephen Bishop – backing vocals

== Charts ==
=== Original version ===
==== Weekly charts ====
Chart (1990)	Peak position
Australia (ARIA)	83
Canada (The Record)	11
Canada Top Singles (RPM)	1
Canada Adult Contemporary (RPM)	1
US Billboard Hot 100	4
US Adult Contemporary (Billboard)	1
US Cash Box Top 100	3

==== Year-end charts ====
Chart (1990)	Position
Canada Top Singles (RPM)	9
Canada Adult Contemporary (RPM)	10
US Billboard Hot 100	53
US Adult Contemporary (Billboard)	1
US Cash Box Top 100	47

=== Live version ===
Chart (1990–1991)	Peak position
Australia (ARIA)	96
Belgium (Ultratop 50 Flanders)	22
Europe (Eurochart Hot 100)	89
France (SNEP)	22
Germany (GfK)	46
Ireland (IRMA)	25
Netherlands (Dutch Top 40)	20
Netherlands (Single Top 100)	20
UK Singles (Official Charts)	57

== Release history ==
Region	Version	Date	Format(s)	Label(s)	Ref(s).
United States	Studio	April 1990	7-inch vinyl	Atlantic	
Japan	Studio	10 May 1990	Mini-CD	WEA	
Australia	Studio	6 August 1990	7-inch vinyl; cassette	WEA	
Australia	Studio	20 August 1990	CD	WEA	
United Kingdom	Live	26 November 1990	7-inch vinyl; 12-inch vinyl; CD1; cassette	Virgin	
Australia	Live	10 December 1990	7-inch vinyl; CD; cassette	WEA	
Japan	Live	10 December 1990	Mini-CD	WEA	
United Kingdom	Live	24 December 1990	CD2	Virgin	
