= Separate Lives =

1985 single by Phil Collins and Marilyn Martin

- UK picture sleeve

Single by Phil Collins and Marilyn Martin

from the album White Nights: Original Motion Picture Soundtrack
- B-side: "I Don't Wanna Know" (US); "Only You Know and I Know" (UK)
- Released: September 1985 (US); 11 November 1985 (UK)
- Recorded: 1985
- Genre: Soft rock
- Length: 4:06
- Label: Atlantic; Virgin; WEA
- Songwriter: Stephen Bishop
- Producers: Arif Mardin; Hugh Padgham; Phil Collins

Phil Collins singles chronology
"Take Me Home" (1985)	"Separate Lives" (1985)	"In the Air Tonight (Remix)" (1988)

Marilyn Martin singles chronology
"Separate Lives" (1985)	"Night Moves" (1986)

Music video
- "Phil Collins - Separate Lives (Official Music Video)" on YouTube

"Separate Lives" is a 1985 song recorded by Phil Collins and Marilyn Martin and featured on the soundtrack to the motion picture White Nights. It reached No. 1 on the US Billboard Hot 100 and Adult Contemporary charts as well as in Canada and Ireland. It reached No. 4 on the UK Singles Chart, and was certified silver by the British Phonographic Industry.

Songwriter Stephen Bishop recorded his own version for his album Sleeping with Girls for Polydor Records, released in 1985. Bishop received an Oscar nomination for Best Original Song in 1986. It lost to Lionel Richie's song "Say You, Say Me" from the same film.

Collins recorded other versions of "Separate Lives" while on tour. He sang with touring singer Amy Keys in 1994, the song appearing on the album Live from the Board. Beginning in 1997, he has performed the song many times with Italian singer Laura Pausini. In 2004, Collins recorded a version with Bridgette Bryant who had toured with him in 1990 in support of ...But Seriously.

== Music video ==
The music video features Martin and Collins singing and playing the piano, intercut with scenes from the movie. It was edited to make it appear that Phil and Marilyn were in the same building as the movie's stars, Mikhail Baryshnikov and Gregory Hines, but in a separate studio. It was directed by Jim Yukich and produced by Paul Flattery of FYI. The film's director, Taylor Hackford, was also at the shoot.

== Personnel ==
- Phil Collins – vocals, drums
- Marilyn Martin – vocals
- Nick Glennie-Smith – keyboards
- Daryl Stuermer – guitar
- Arif Mardin – orchestration and conductor

== Chart history ==
=== Weekly charts ===
Weekly chart performance for "Separate Lives"
Chart (1985–1986)	Peak position
Australia (Kent Music Report)	14
Belgium (Ultratop 50 Flanders)	25
Canada Top Singles (RPM)	1
Canada Adult Contemporary (RPM)	1
Canada (The Record)	1
Europe (European Hot 100 Singles)	28
France (SNEP)	44
Germany (GfK)	50
Ireland (IRMA)	1
Netherlands (Single Top 100)	43
New Zealand (Recorded Music NZ)	29
Norway (VG-lista)	7
Paraguay (UPI)	3
UK Singles (Official Charts)	4
UK Airplay (Music & Media)	9
US Billboard Hot 100	1
US Adult Contemporary (Billboard)	1

=== Year-end charts ===
Year-end chart performance for "Separate Lives"
Chart (1985)	Position
Canada RPM Top 100	10
US Billboard Hot 100	50

== See also ==
- List of number-one adult contemporary singles of 1985 (U.S.)
