= I Wish It Would Rain Down =

1990 single by Phil Collins

Single by Phil Collins

from the album ...But Seriously
- B-side: "Homeless"; "You've Been in Love (That Little Bit Too Long)"
- Released: 15 January 1990
- Length: 5:27
- Label: Virgin
- Songwriter: Phil Collins
- Producers: Phil Collins; Hugh Padgham

Phil Collins singles chronology
"Another Day in Paradise" (1989)	"I Wish It Would Rain Down" (1990)	"Something Happened on the Way to Heaven" (1990)

Music video
- "I Wish It Would Rain Down" on YouTube

"I Wish It Would Rain Down" is a song by English musician Phil Collins from his fourth solo studio album, ...But Seriously (1989). The song was a chart success in early 1990, peaking at No. 7 on the UK Singles Chart, No. 3 on the US Billboard Hot 100 and No. 1 on the Canadian RPM 100 Singles chart; in the latter country, it was the most successful song of 1990. Collins felt that it was as close as he had ever got, at the time, to writing a blues song.

Eric Clapton plays lead guitar throughout the song, which also features a large gospel choir. Regarding Clapton's contribution, Collins recalls, "I said 'Eric, have I never asked you to play? Come on, I've got a song right up your street.'"

== Chart performance ==
The song was a significant chart hit in 1990, peaking at No. 3 on the Billboard Hot 100 in the United States and No. 1 on the RPM 100 Singles chart in Canada. In Canada, it was the longest-running number one single of 1990, spending six weeks atop the charts, and ranked as the top single of the year on RPM's year-end chart. It also reached number seven on the UK Singles Chart and number three in Belgium and the Netherlands.

== Music video ==
The 8:30 minute-long black-and-white music video, produced by Paul Flattery and directed by Jim Yukich for FYI, contains 2:30 minutes of acting prior to the start of the music. The setting is a theatre in the 1930s, parodying Gone with the Wind. Actor Jeffrey Tambor plays a hyper-critical, unhappy theatre director. He is rehearsing some dancers (who are dancing to the guitar/bass guitar riff from the song "Sunshine of Your Love" by the band Cream, in which Eric Clapton played guitar). The director complains that the girls can neither dance nor sing, and then discovers that his star has appendicitis.

Eric Clapton, seated on a stool, says that Billy (played by Collins) used to be the drummer in a good band and assumed singing responsibilities when the original singer departed—an in-joke referencing Collins' tenure with the band Genesis, in which he played drums and then became the lead singer when Peter Gabriel exited the group. Members of Collins' backing band play various non-speaking parts, such as the janitor "Chester" Chester Thompson, who takes over on drums when Collins gets up to sing, as well as the bassist Leland Sklar.

Collins is forced to act with the play's star. The director deems Collins' acting "terrible," to which Collins replies, "I never said I could act, 'e [pointing to Clapton] said I could sing," and the director says, "alright, play the song." As Collins sings, his character fantasizes about becoming a famous stage actor, singer, and movie star.

Billy's name is inserted onto fake covers of major industry publications such as Variety and Billboard and newspapers such as the Denver Post. His face is inserted into still photographs from the television program You Bet Your Life (where he appears next to Groucho Marx) and films such as White Heat (where his image is inserted alongside that of James Cagney). Billy is depicted imitating the character of Davy Crockett (as played by Fess Parker on the television series of the same name), standing next to Marilyn Monroe, and acting out a scene from the 1941 film The Maltese Falcon (with Humphrey Bogart impersonator Robert Sacchi appearing in the scene). (Music video director James Yukich's name appears on the clapperboard.) Billy is shown receiving an Academy Award from Clark Gable (impersonated by actor Ralph Chelli).

During the montage, the published sheet music for the song is shown, prominently featuring Collins' photo. This is followed by a shot of the sheet music for "Something Happened on the Way to Heaven", the next single from the same album.

After the music ends, Tambor's character decides to cut the musical number, as he feels it was not any good compared to the dancing girls. The character says "the fellow on the guitar (Eric Clapton) is pretty good," but his assistant informs him that "Eric gave a week's notice." Collins, in disbelief, goes back to sit behind the drums.

== Track listings ==
CD maxi and 12-inch single

1. "I Wish It Would Rain Down"
2. "Homeless" ("Another Day in Paradise" demo)
3. "You've Been in Love (That Little Bit Too Long)"

7-inch single (UK)

1. "I Wish It Would Rain Down"
2. ""Homeless" ("Another Day in Paradise" demo)"

7-inch single (US)/Canada

1. "I Wish It Would Rain Down"
2. "You've Been in Love (That Little Bit Too Long)"

== Personnel ==
Personnel are adapted from the ...But Seriously liner notes.

- Phil Collins – keyboards, vocals, drums, tambourine
- Eric Clapton – guitars
- Pino Palladino – bass

== Charts ==
=== Weekly charts ===
Chart (1990)	Peak position
Australia (ARIA)	15
Austria (Ö3 Austria Top 40)	26
Belgium (Ultratop 50 Flanders)	3
Canada Top Singles (RPM)	1
Canada Adult Contemporary (RPM)	4
Europe (Eurochart Hot 100)	6
Finland (Suomen virallinen lista)	4
France (SNEP)	11
Ireland (IRMA)	4
Italy Airplay (Music & Media)	1
Netherlands (Dutch Top 40)	3
Netherlands (Single Top 100)	4
New Zealand (Recorded Music NZ)	27
Sweden (Sverigetopplistan)	7
Switzerland (Schweizer Hitparade)	8
UK Singles (Official Charts)	7
UK Airplay (Music & Media)	3
US Billboard Hot 100	3
US Adult Contemporary (Billboard)	3
US Mainstream Rock (Billboard)	5
West Germany (GfK)	8
Zimbabwe (ZIMA)	2

=== Year-end charts ===
Chart (1990)	Position
Australian (ARIA)	94
Belgium (Ultratop)	46
Canada Top Singles (RPM)	1
Canada Adult Contemporary (RPM)	35
Europe (Eurochart Hot 100)	35
Germany (Media Control)	48
Netherlands (Dutch Top 40)	29
Netherlands (Single Top 100)	43
US Billboard Hot 100	56
US Adult Contemporary (Billboard)	35
US Album Rock Tracks (Billboard)	28

== Certifications ==
Region	Certification	Certified units/sales
New Zealand (RMNZ)	Gold	15,000^{‡}
United Kingdom (BPI)	Silver	200,000^{‡}
^{‡} Sales+streaming figures based on certification alone.

== Release history ==
Region	Date	Format(s)	Label(s)	Ref.
United Kingdom	15 January 1990	—N/a	Virgin	
Japan	10 February 1990	Mini-CD	WEA	
Australia	12 February 1990	7-inch vinyl; cassette	WEA	
