= Something Happened on the Way to Heaven =

1990 single by Phil Collins

- Artwork for UK release

Single by Phil Collins

from the album ...But Seriously
- B-side: "I Wish It Would Rain Down" (demo)
- Released: 16 April 1990
- Genre: Pop rock; R&B
- Length: 4:52
- Label: Virgin
- Songwriters: Phil Collins; Daryl Stuermer
- Producers: Phil Collins; Hugh Padgham

Phil Collins singles chronology
"I Wish It Would Rain Down" (1990)	"Something Happened on the Way to Heaven" (1990)	"Do You Remember?" (1990)

Music video
- "Something Happened on the Way to Heaven" on YouTube

"Something Happened on the Way to Heaven" is a song by English musician Phil Collins, released in April 1990 by Atlantic, Virgin and WEA from his fourth studio album, ...But Seriously (1989). The song peaked at No. 4 on the US Billboard Hot 100 for the week of 6 October 1990 and No. 15 on the UK Singles Chart. A live version also appears on the Serious Hits... Live! album. The song is often identified by the recurring hook, "How many times can I say 'I'm sorry'?", although the title of the song is in fact the second line of the second verse.

The song was written by Phil Collins and longtime Genesis/Collins guitarist Daryl Stuermer and was produced by Collins and Hugh Padgham. It was also included on ...Hits. The song was originally written for the film The War of the Roses.

== Artworks ==
The single's UK release featured comedian Tony Hancock on its front cover. The different cover art for the international single release is a still from the 1946 film A Matter of Life and Death (also titled in the US Stairway to Heaven) created by Powell and Pressburger, and permitted for use by Rank Film Distributors.

== Critical reception ==
Professional ratings
Review scores
Source	Rating
AllMusic	2.5/5 stars

Upon its release as a single, Gary Crossing of Record Mirror noted the "pseudo-Seventies Motown brass, the familiar Collins sticksmanship and the regular nauseating vocals".

== Music video ==
The music video for "Something Happened on the Way to Heaven" was directed by Jim Yukich, produced by Paul Flattery, and written by both of them for FYI. A dog is seen napping in a meadow, dreaming of being in a silent film in which it saves a woman tied to a set of railway tracks from being run over by a train. The opening of the song is heard faintly in the distance, coming from the open back door of a concert hall, prompting the dog to wake up and venture inside. Here, Collins and his band are conducting a sound check before performing the song as the dog explores the facility—eating from the band's buffet table, climbing among the catwalks, and sitting briefly at Collins' piano and drum kit. These sequences are intercut with shots from the dog's black-and-white perspective, including a brief dream in which it sits at a formal table laden with food.

At two different moments, the dog relieves itself on stage—first by defecating near backing singer Arnold McCuller, which is only discovered when he steps in the resulting mess, and later by urinating on bassist Leland Sklar's leg. The latter occurs near the end of the song, and the video concludes after Collins smiles and wipes Sklar's shoe with a towel (Sklar did not perform on the actual studio recording; Nathan East is the actual performer).

== Track listings ==
- CD maxi
1. "Something Happened on the Way to Heaven" – 4:37
2. "Something Happened on the Way to Heaven" (One World Remix) – 5:38
3. "I Wish It Would Rain Down" (demo) – 5:19
- 7-inch single
1. "Something Happened on the Way to Heaven" (edit) – 4:37
2. "I Wish It Would Rain Down" (demo) – 5:19
- 12-inch maxi
1. "Something Happened on the Way to Heaven" – 4:37
2. "Something Happened on the Way to Heaven" (One World Remix) – 5:38
3. "I Wish It Would Rain Down" (demo) – 5:19

== Credits ==
- Phil Collins – vocals, keyboards, drums
- Daryl Stuermer – guitars
- Dominic Miller – guitars
- Nathan East – bass
- The Phenix Horns
  - Don Myrick – saxophone
  - Louis Satterfield – trombone
  - Harry Kim – trumpet
  - Rahmlee Michael Davis – trumpet
- Arranged by Tom Tom 84
- Alex Brown – backing vocals
- Lynne Fiddmont – backing vocals
- Marva King – backing vocals

== Charts ==
=== Weekly charts ===
Chart (1990)	Peak position
Australia (ARIA)	58
Belgium (Ultratop 50 Flanders)	8
Canada Top Singles (RPM)	1
Canada Adult Contemporary (RPM)	2
Europe (Eurochart Hot 100)	22
Finland (Suomen virallinen lista)	7
France (SNEP)	35
Ireland (IRMA)	8
Italy Airplay (Music & Media)	5
Luxembourg (Radio Luxembourg)	9
Netherlands (Dutch Top 40)	5
Netherlands (Single Top 100)	9
Switzerland (Schweizer Hitparade)	26
UK Singles (Official Charts)	15
UK Airplay (Music & Media)	2
US Billboard Hot 100	4
US Adult Contemporary (Billboard)	2
US Mainstream Rock (Billboard)	34
US Cash Box Top 100	3
West Germany (GfK)	26

=== Year-end charts ===
Chart (1990)	Position
Belgium (Ultratop)	85
Canada Top Singles (RPM)	12
Canada Adult Contemporary (RPM)	13
Netherlands (Dutch Top 40)	65
US Billboard Hot 100	58
US Adult Contemporary (Billboard)	22
US Cash Box Top 100	22

== Certifications ==
Region	Certification	Certified units/sales
United Kingdom (BPI) Sales since 2011	Silver	200,000^{‡}
^{‡} Sales+streaming figures based on certification alone.

== Release history ==
Region	Date	Format(s)	Label(s)	Ref.
United Kingdom	16 April 1990	7-inch vinyl; 12-inch vinyl; CD; cassette	Virgin	
Australia	14 May 1990	7-inch vinyl; 12-inch vinyl; CD; cassette	WEA	
Japan	10 August 1990	Mini-CD	WEA	

== Deborah Cox version ==
"Something Happened on the Way to Heaven"
- Banner of the US 12-inch retail single

Single by Deborah Cox
- Released: 2003
- Genre: House
- Songwriters: Phil Collins, Daryl Stuermer

In 2003, Canadian singer Deborah Cox recorded an R&B cover of the track, which was included on the Phil Collins tribute compilation Urban Renewal. It peaked at No. 95 on the Billboard Hot 100. A club/house remix was issued as a single, reaching No. 1 on the US Billboard Hot Dance Airplay chart in November 2003, where it remained at the top until February 2004. The track spent 11 weeks at No. 1—10 of them consecutively—making it the first single on the chart to achieve this feat, a record she held until 2009, when Lady Gaga surpassed it with her single "Poker Face", which spent 15 weeks at the top.
