= Another Day in Paradise =

1989 single by Phil Collins

Single by Phil Collins

from the album ...But Seriously
- B-side: "Heat on the Street"
- Released: 23 October 1989
- Genre: Soft rock
- Length: 4:47 (single version); 5:22 (album version)
- Label: Virgin
- Songwriter: Phil Collins
- Producers: Phil Collins; Hugh Padgham

Phil Collins singles chronology
"Two Hearts" (1988)	"Another Day in Paradise" (1989)	"I Wish It Would Rain Down" (1990)

Audio sample
- file; help

Music video
- "Another Day in Paradise" on YouTube

"Another Day in Paradise" is a song written and recorded by the English musician Phil Collins. Produced by Collins along with Hugh Padgham, it was released as the first single from his number-one album ...But Seriously (1989). As with his song for Genesis, "Man on the Corner", the track addresses the issue of homelessness; as such, the song was a substantial departure from the dance-pop music of his previous album, No Jacket Required (1985).

Collins sings the song from a third-person perspective, as he observes a man ignoring a homeless woman, and he implores listeners not to turn a blind eye to homelessness because, by drawing a religious allusion, "it's just another day for you and me in paradise". Collins also appeals directly to God by singing: "Oh Lord, is there nothing more anybody can do? Oh Lord, there must be something you can say."

The song was Collins' seventh and final Billboard Hot 100 No. 1 single, the last No. 1 single of the 1980s and the first No. 1 single of the 1990s. It was a worldwide success, eventually becoming one of the most successful songs of his solo career. It won Collins and Padgham the Grammy Award for Record of the Year at the 1991 awards ceremony, while it was also nominated for Song of the Year, Best Pop Vocal Performance, Male and Best Music Video, Short Form. "Another Day in Paradise" also won an award for British Single at the 1990 Brit Awards. Despite the awards gained following its release, the song also generated controversy over its subject matter and has received a largely unfavourable reaction from music critics.

The live performance of the song at the 1991 Grammy Awards by Collins and David Crosby, who provided backing vocals on the track, was released on the 1994 album Grammy's Greatest Moments Volume I. In 2009, Collins' version was listed 86th on Billboard's Greatest Songs of All Time. "Another Day in Paradise" has since been covered by several artists, including Brandy and her brother Ray J, Jam Tronik, Axxis, Novecento, Brad Arnold and Hank Marvin.

== Background ==
Collins wrote "Another Day in Paradise" under the working title "Homeless". Collins cited an encounter with a homeless individual with two kids asking for financial assistance and the witnessing of people sleeping on an outdoor grill after the conclusion of one of Collins' concerts. He found the contrast of people lacking adequate shelter within viewing distance of Capitol Hill to be "an extraordinary contradiction". Collins discussed how these encounters informed the lyrical direction of "Another Day in Paradise".

What (the song) also deals with is people's awkwardness with it. When it happened to me, I just walked straight past. I thought, I'm doing the same thing as everybody else. I felt awkward...That's what the song deals with, people just sort of starting to pretend it's not happening.

David Crosby, who had met Collins at the Atlantic Records 40th Anniversary concert in Madison Square Garden, provided some vocals on "Another Day in Paradise". Collins said that "David did exactly what I expected him to do. He just picked a few notes out of the air that I would never have thought of." He had originally wanted Crosby to overdub some vocals on his first solo album, Face Value, but Crosby was unable to attend those sessions.

When determining which song to release as the first single from his solo album ...But Seriously, Collins selected "Another Day in Paradise" as he felt that it was different from what he had done before. The single version is slightly different from the album version in that it uses a shorter intro.

"Another Day in Paradise" entered the Billboard Hot 100 at number 43 on the week dated 4 November 1989. Seven weeks later, on 23 December 1989, it became his seventh (and, to date, final) No. 1 single in the U.S as a solo artist and his eighth number one hit when accounting for "Invisible Touch" as a member of Genesis. The song was also the final No. 1 song of the 1980s in the U.S., and remained at that position for four weeks. The song had already reached No. 2 in the UK in November of that year.

== Music video ==
The song's music video was directed by Jim Yukich and produced by Paul Flattery of FYI. The video, shot entirely in black and white, features Collins singing in a dark background, interspersed with images of the homeless, the refugees and the poverty of children in the streets. The music video also features many messages about the homeless, to convey the full message of the song. Collins' part was shot in less than an hour in New York.

== Reception ==
Professional ratings
Review scores
Source	Rating
AllMusic	2.5/5 stars

"Another Day in Paradise" provoked controversy upon release and was widely criticised. Some critics found the wealthy Collins unqualified to sing about the poor, while others accused him of profiteering from homelessness. Collins responded, "When I drive down the street, I see the same things everyone else sees. It's a misconception that if you have a lot of money you're somehow out of touch with reality."

Billboard gave a positive review, calling it a "poignant" track whose "subject matter is complemented nicely by a subdued, ethereal musical context". Cashbox commended Collins' vocals, saying that he "adopted the cool white-soul tones that fellow travelers Paul Carrack and Squeeze have so ably championed." Music & Media characterised "Another Day in the Paradise" as a "devilishly catchy semi-ballad" and a "guaranteed hit that will not leave you alone".

Singer-songwriter and political activist Billy Bragg gave a 2000 interview in which he negatively compared Collins to the Clash, stating, "Phil Collins might write a song about the homeless, but if he doesn't have the action to go with it he's just exploiting that for a subject." In 2003, Andrew Collins described the song as a "bland redress" for the subject of homelessness in the New Statesman. In 2007, Blender remarked that Collins "wrote the worst song ever about homelessness", while Caroline Sullivan of The Guardian called it "a song that addressed the issue of homelessness with the same insight as Sporty Spice's 'If That Were Me'". Writing for the BBC in 2010, David Sheppard described the song's lyrics as "cringe-worthy" and gave it as an example of Collins "painting the bull's-eye on his own forehead" when it came to his negative status with music critics. In 2016, Mark Beaumont of NME called it "arguably the corniest multi-millionaire-notices-homelessness-from-gold-plated-limousine ballad ever recorded".

It was reported that Collins left the UK for Switzerland in 1997, in response to the election of a Labour government; Collins had actually left previously to be with his future wife Orianne Cevey. In 2013, MSN's Hugh Wilson said this relocation led to further accusations of hypocrisy, since Collins "bemoaned the plight of the homeless in the song 'Another Day in Paradise' " then "lugged his estimated £130 million fortune to Switzerland where the tax regime is far less punishing for the super wealthy".

In a 2016 article for The Guardian, Michael Hann wrote, "Collins has been unfairly criticised for many things, but 'Another Day in Paradise' is not one of them. Criticism of that is manifestly fair." Hann argued that the song patronizes the general public, who "almost certainly encounter poverty more often than [Collins]", and chided Collins for "[equating] his material wealth with his listener's by pointing out that both 'you and me' are in paradise".

Jamie Wales of Gigwise described the track as a "classic", and said of the hypocrisy allegations levelled at Collins, "The truth is Phil collected money for homeless charities from fans who attended his concerts and then donated double the total takings out of his own money."

== Track listings ==
12-inch single

1. "Another Day in Paradise" (album version) – 5:22
2. "Another Day in Paradise" (radio edit) – 4:40

CD maxi single

1. "Another Day in Paradise" – 5:15
2. "Saturday Night and Sunday Morning" – 1:25
3. "Heat on the Street" – 3:59

7-inch single

1. "Another Day in Paradise" – 4:48
2. "Heat on the Street" – 3:59

Mini-CD single

1. "Another Day in Paradise" – 5:19
2. "Saturday Night and Sunday Morning" – 1:26
3. "Heat on the Street" – 4:00

== Personnel ==
- Phil Collins – vocals, keyboards, drums, Roland TR-808 drum machine
- David Crosby – backing vocals
- Dominic Miller – electric guitar, classical guitar
- Leland Sklar – bass

== Charts ==
=== Weekly charts ===
Chart (1989–1990)	Peak position
Australia (ARIA)	11
Austria (Ö3 Austria Top 40)	2
Belgium (Ultratop 50 Flanders)	1
Canada Top Singles (RPM)	1
Canada Adult Contemporary (RPM)	1
Denmark (IFPI)	2
Europe (Eurochart Hot 100)	1
Finland (Suomen virallinen lista)	1
France (SNEP)	8
Ireland (IRMA)	2
Italy (Musica e dischi)	2
Italy Airplay (Music & Media)	2
Netherlands (Dutch Top 40)	2
Netherlands (Single Top 100)	1
New Zealand (Recorded Music NZ)	5
Norway (VG-lista)	1
Portugal (AFP)	1
Spain (AFYVE)	9
Sweden (Sverigetopplistan)	1
Switzerland (Schweizer Hitparade)	1
UK Singles (Official Charts)	2
UK Airplay (Music & Media)	1
US Billboard Hot 100	1
US Adult Contemporary (Billboard)	1
US Mainstream Rock Airplay (Billboard)	7
West Germany (GfK)	1
Zimbabwe (ZIMA)	1

Chart (2019)	Peak position
Slovenia (SloTop50)	50

Chart (2021)	Peak position
Russia Airplay (TopHit)	53

=== Year-end charts ===
Chart (1989)	Position
Belgium (Ultratop)	68
Canada Top Singles (RPM)	78
Europe (Eurochart Hot 100)	56
Netherlands (Dutch Top 40)	47
Netherlands (Single Top 100)	22
UK Singles (OCC)	46

Chart (1990)	Position
Austria (Ö3 Austria Top 40)	26
Belgium (Ultratop)	69
Canada Top Singles (RPM)	23
Canada Adult Contemporary (RPM)	27
Europe (Eurochart Hot 100)	23
Germany (Media Control)	3
Switzerland (Schweizer Hitparade)	11
US Billboard Hot 100	7
US Adult Contemporary (Billboard)	11

=== Decade-end charts ===
Chart (1990–1999)	Position
Belgium (Ultratop 50 Flanders)	45

=== All-time charts ===
Chart (1958–2018)	Position
US Billboard Hot 100	109

== Certifications ==
Region	Certification	Certified units/sales
Australia (ARIA)	Gold	35,000^{^}
Denmark (IFPI Danmark)	Platinum	90,000^{‡}
France (SNEP)	Silver	200,000^{*}
France (SNEP) 2016 remaster	Platinum	200,000^{‡}
Germany (BVMI)	Gold	250,000^{^}
Italy (FIMI)	Gold	25,000^{‡}
New Zealand (RMNZ)	2× Platinum	60,000^{‡}
Spain (Promusicae)	Platinum	60,000^{‡}
Sweden (GLF)	Platinum	50,000^{^}
United Kingdom (BPI) 1989 release	Silver	200,000^{^}
United Kingdom (BPI) 2004 release	Platinum	600,000^{‡}
United States (RIAA)	Gold	500,000^{^}
^{*} Sales figures based on certification alone.^{^} Shipments figures based on certification alone.^{‡} Sales+streaming figures based on certification alone.

== Jam Tronik version ==
"Another Day in Paradise"

Single by Jam Tronik
- B-side: "Get on the Raze"
- Released: 1990
- Length: 4:50
- Label: Debut Edge; ZYX
- Songwriter: Phil Collins
- Producer: Charlie Glas

Jam Tronik singles chronology
"Another Day in Paradise" (1990)	"Yesterday Once More (Every Sha La La La)" (1991)

Less than six months after the release of the original Phil Collins version, a cover version by German dance act Jam Tronik was released as their debut single. In the United Kingdom, the song first charted in March 1990, reaching a peak of number 19 on the UK Singles Chart in the first week of April. It also charted in Germany and Belgium. Sampled in this version is the drum loop from the 1988 Raze song "Break 4 Love". The B-side, "Get on the Raze", also samples "Break 4 Love".

=== Charts ===
Chart (1990)	Peak position
Belgium (Ultratop 50 Flanders)	30
UK Singles (Official Charts)	19
West Germany (GfK)	17

== Brandy and Ray J version ==
"Another Day in Paradise"

Single by Brandy and Ray J

from the album Urban Renewal
- Released: 19 March 2001
- Studio: Banana Boat (Burbank, California)
- Length: 4:32
- Label: WEA
- Songwriter: Phil Collins
- Producer: Guy Roche

Brandy singles chronology
"Never Say Never" (2000)	"Another Day in Paradise" (2001)	"What About Us?" (2002)

Ray J singles chronology
"That's Why I Lie" (1998)	"Another Day in Paradise" (2001)	"Wait a Minute" (2001)

Music video
- "Another Day in Paradise" on YouTube

In 2001, siblings Brandy and Ray J covered the song for the Phil Collins tribute album Urban Renewal. Produced by Guy Roche and released as the album's lead single in March 2001, the cover version became a top-10 success in Australia and across Europe, receiving gold certifications in Australia, France, Germany, and Switzerland. In 2002, this version of the song was included on the European edition of Brandy's Full Moon album.

=== Critical reception ===
In their review, Music Week felt that the "US siblings are likely to score a hit with this infectiously familiar track."

=== Music video ===
The music video follows a homeless woman wandering the streets being chastised by various people, including a waitress, a businessman, and a police officer. The video is intercut with scenes of Brandy and Ray J singing on a fire escape and along alleyways, while also following the woman and taking photographs of each incident with a camera. The homeless woman then walks into a luxurious shoe boutique, and the receptionist calls the police to escort her out. When she is dropped back to her makeshift shelter in an alleyway, one of the policemen comes across a series of Polaroids depicting all of the previous characters, including himself, in the homeless woman's place. At the end of the video, Brandy and Ray J come to pick up the homeless woman and walk off with her into the distance.

=== Track listings ===
CD maxi single

1. "Another Day in Paradise" (R&B-Version) – 4:32
2. "Another Day in Paradise" (Stargate Mix) – 4:19
3. "Another Day in Paradise" (Stargate Classic Club) – 4:22
4. "Another Day in Paradise" (Knee Deep Remix) – 6:28
5. "Another Day in Paradise" (Black Legend VS. J-Reverse Club Mix) – 7:54

CD single

1. "Another Day in Paradise" (R&B-Version) – 4:32
2. "Another Day in Paradise" (Stargate Mix) – 4:19

The Remixes – 12-inch maxi

1. "Another Day in Paradise" (Knee Deep Remix) – 6:28
2. "Another Day in Paradise" (Black Legend vs. J-Reverse Club Mix) – 7:54

=== Credits and personnel ===
- Arrangement – Guy Roche
- Engineering – Dushyant Bhakta, Doarian Cheah
- Engineering assistance – Michael Huff, Ron Ben-Simon
- Mixing – Brad Gilderman
- Production – Guy Roche
- Songwriting – Phil Collins

=== Charts ===
==== Weekly charts ====
Chart (2001)	Peak position
Australia (ARIA)	11
Australian Urban (ARIA)	4
Austria (Ö3 Austria Top 40)	5
Belgium (Ultratop 50 Flanders)	9
Belgium (Ultratop 50 Wallonia)	7
Denmark (Tracklisten)	6
Europe (Eurochart Hot 100)	8
France (SNEP)	11
Germany (GfK)	2
Hungary (Mahasz)	5
Ireland (IRMA)	4
Netherlands (Dutch Top 40)	4
Netherlands (Single Top 100)	6
New Zealand (Recorded Music NZ)	29
Norway (VG-lista)	4
Poland Airplay (Music & Media)	6
Poland (Polish Airplay Chart)	5
Scottish Singles Sales (Official Charts)	9
Sweden (Sverigetopplistan)	4
Switzerland (Schweizer Hitparade)	3
UK Singles (Official Charts)	5
UK Hip Hop/R&B (Official Charts)	2

==== Year-end charts ====
Chart (2001)	Position
Australia (ARIA)	76
Austria (Ö3 Austria Top 40)	54
Belgium (Ultratop 50 Flanders)	46
Belgium (Ultratop 50 Wallonia)	48
Europe (Eurochart Hot 100)	34
France (SNEP)	61
Germany (Media Control)	31
Ireland (IRMA)	40
Netherlands (Dutch Top 40)	47
Netherlands (Single Top 100)	47
Sweden (Hitlistan)	22
Switzerland (Schweizer Hitparade)	26
UK Singles (OCC)	64

=== Certifications ===
Region	Certification	Certified units/sales
Australia (ARIA)	Gold	35,000^{^}
Belgium (BRMA)	Gold	25,000^{*}
France (SNEP)	Gold	250,000^{*}
Germany (BVMI)	Gold	250,000^{^}
Switzerland (IFPI Switzerland)	Gold	20,000^{^}
United Kingdom (BPI)	Silver	200,000^{‡}
^{*} Sales figures based on certification alone.^{^} Shipments figures based on certification alone.^{‡} Sales+streaming figures based on certification alone.

=== Release history ===
Region	Date	Format(s)	Label(s)	Ref.
Germany	19 March 2001	CD	WEA	
Australia	30 April 2001	CD	WEA	
United Kingdom	4 June 2001	CD; cassette	WEA	

== See also ==
- List of European number-one airplay songs of the 1990s
