= ...But Seriously =

1989 album by Phil Collins

Studio album by Phil Collins
- Released: 20 November 1989
- Recorded: April–October 1989
- Studios: The Farm (Chiddingfold); A&M (Hollywood)
- Genres: Pop rock; soft rock; R&B
- Length: 59:42 (CD); 54:25 (LP)
- Labels: Virgin, Atlantic
- Producers: Phil Collins; Hugh Padgham

Phil Collins chronology
12"ers (1987)	...But Seriously (1989)	Serious Hits... Live! (1990)

Singles from ...But Seriously
- 1. "Another Day in Paradise" Released: 23 October 1989; 2. "I Wish It Would Rain Down" Released: 15 January 1990; 3. "Something Happened on the Way to Heaven" Released: 16 April 1990 (UK); 4. "Do You Remember?" Released: April 1990 (US); 5. "That's Just the Way It Is" Released: 16 July 1990; 6. "Hang in Long Enough" Released: 17 September 1990

...But Seriously is the fourth studio album by the English drummer and singer-songwriter Phil Collins. It was released on 20 November 1989 in the United Kingdom by Virgin Records and by Atlantic Records in the United States. After Collins finished touring commitments with the rock band Genesis in 1987, the group entered a four-year hiatus, during which Collins starred in the feature film Buster (1988). By the spring of 1989, Collins had written material for a new solo album, which addressed more serious lyrical themes, like socio-economic and political issues, as opposed to his previous dance-oriented album, No Jacket Required (1985).

...But Seriously was a huge commercial success worldwide, reaching No. 1 in the UK and the US for 15 and four non-consecutive weeks, respectively. It was the UK's best-selling album of 1990, eventually selling 2.75 million copies there, and remains Collins' best-selling album in the UK. It sold four million copies in the US. The lead single, "Another Day in Paradise", won a Grammy Award for Record of the Year. Collins supported the album with the Seriously, Live! World Tour in 1990. In 2016, the album was remastered with additional studio, live, and demo tracks, and updated artwork.

== Background ==
In July 1987, Collins finished his touring commitments with Genesis and resumed his solo career. He had scored a series of hit singles with his previous solo album No Jacket Required (1985) and with Genesis on Invisible Touch (1986), and recognised this period as "severe danger of overkill" due to the high amount of radio airplay the songs had received. To combat this, Collins took a year out solely from music and accepted a lead role in Buster (1988), a romantic comedy film based on the Great Train Robbery. Collins recorded "Two Hearts" and "A Groovy Kind of Love" for the soundtrack, which led to his belief that people thought his songs had become "Very, very light. That wasn't where I was coming from." When he started work on his next solo album, Collins deliberately shifted styles by addressing more serious issues in his lyrics and songs with greater depth than the dance-oriented approach for No Jacket Required. Some bits of music originated as far back as 1978. Primarily, Collins wrote and demoed the songs at his Old Croft home onto a 12-track recorder with piano, drum machine & keyboards, then he did a guide vocal to improvise lyric and melody ideas. The lyrics for songs like "Another Day in Paradise" and "That's Just the Way It Is" were developed around these initial vocal ideas.

== Production ==
...But Seriously was recorded between April and October 1989 at The Farm in Chiddingfold, Surrey and A&M Studios in Los Angeles, California. It was produced by Collins and Hugh Padgham, who had worked on his previous solo albums and with Genesis throughout the decade. The album saw Collins use a live drum kit in contrast with No Jacket Required which had greater use of a drum machine, although the Roland TR-808 did make a prominent appearance on the tracks "That's Just The Way It Is", "Do You Remember?" and "Father to Son". He also prominently used keyboards and electric piano and fewer synthesisers. Collins made a conscious decision not to rely on vocal effects on the album as his previous recordings, including with Genesis, involved the use of a harmoniser and echo and he looked back on this as a way of hiding the perceived drawbacks he had about his singing. In the end, a small amount of reverb and delay for a slap echo effect were used.

Additionally, while for previous albums Collins transferred his original demos onto 24-track as a basis for the final songs, on ...But Seriously, he decided to record songs from scratch in the studio without using the demo tapes. Keyboards and drum machine were put down first, followed by real drums and then overdubs from other musicians, done in a piecemeal way. On two songs, including "Something Happened on the Way to Heaven", Collins recorded with a full rhythm section for the basic track, alongside Daryl Stuermer and Nathan East.

Collins experienced difficulty in naming the album. The initial title was Serious Business, before Collins decided against the potential connotations of business or corporations that it may have on the public. As the title suggests, the album is a change of pace from the lighter tone of Collins's previous work. Collins expanded his focus to the exploration of socio-economic and political themes. There is emotional turmoil underneath the polished studio production and many of the songs are unambiguous and unveiled in their melancholy. While incorporating political themes, ...But Seriously does not abandon the theme of relationships. But unlike some of his earlier work, Collins takes a more mature and reflective approach when looking at the relationships in his life.

As with his previous albums Collins wrote the sleeve notes by hand because "that's all part of the personal statement"; the exception being No Jacket Required. He wrote the text on the "Another Day in Paradise" single on the inbound from the album's European press trip in November 1989.

== Songs ==
Atlantic Records initially placed a sticker on the CD version that read "Two bonus tracks" which Collins disagreed with and clarified that they were "extra" songs. The sticker was changed accordingly. The album was a departure from the dance pop of the No Jacket Required album. Unlike No Jacket Required, this album was a pop-rock album, but also included various styles and influences, like R&B, dance-pop, jazz, soul and gospel.

"Hang in Long Enough" is the opening track on the album. It is a dance-pop song, with influenced soul and rock, and talks about ambition.

"That's Just the Way It Is" is an anti-war ballad about The Troubles in Northern Ireland and features David Crosby on backing vocals. Collins had wanted Crosby to perform on his first solo album Face Value (1981), but he was unavailable at the time. The two met at the Atlantic Records 40th Anniversary concert in 1988, and Crosby was keen to participate on the album. When recording moved to Los Angeles, Collins prepared several mixes of the songs that he wanted Crosby to sing on and recalled that Crosby "did exactly what I expected him to do [...] He just picked a few notes out of the air that I would never have thought of". The B-side to the single was "Broadway Chorus", the demo version of "Something Happened on the Way to Heaven".

"Do You Remember?" has lyrics from the perspective of a man whose relationship is failing due to his lover's neglect. It features Stephen Bishop on backing vocals.

"Something Happened on the Way to Heaven" was written by Collins and his longtime touring guitarist Daryl Stuermer. It was the last song written for the album and was originally for the Four Tops, but it was not delivered to the group as Collins wanted to keep it for himself by the time it was finished. While the song was being arranged in the studio in England, Stuermer had devised some chords for the chorus which resulted in Nathan East playing bass on the new parts as Sklar had left for the US.

"Colours" is a politically themed song condemning apartheid in South Africa and displays a progressive rock influence. It was originally titled "Oh Mr. Botha, What Can We Do?", a reference to the English music hall song "Oh! Mr Porter".

"I Wish It Would Rain Down" is a gospel-influenced track that Collins said is the closest he had come to writing a blues song. It features Eric Clapton on lead guitar.

"Another Day in Paradise" addresses the issue of homelessness. Its working title was "Homeless". Among the inspirational sources for the song was Collins's stay in Washington, D.C., while on tour and encountered homeless people by Capitol Hill trying to keep warm and the contradiction of the White House being so close by.

"Heat on the Street" is a political song about the abuse and violence in the street. The song has a pop-rock oriented sound.

Collins wrote in his autobiography Not Dead Yet that "All of My Life" is about his relationship with his late father and his regrets to not have more connection with him during his life. The song is a ballad influenced by R&B and jazz. Steve Winwood plays Hammond organ on the song.

The album also features a sole instrumental track, "Saturday Night and Sunday Morning", which recalls the jazz-influenced instrumentals featured on his first two albums, Face Value and Hello, I Must Be Going.

"Father to Son" is a ballad about Collins's relationship with his eldest son, Simon.

The closing track, "Find a Way to My Heart", is a simple rock-sounding love song, though with a heavy horn section and a synthesized intro and coda. It was later used in the 1990 action film Fire Birds.

=== Additional material ===
Collins recorded three other songs that were released as B-sides to the album's singles:

1. "That's How I Feel"
2. "You've Been in Love (That Little Bit Too Long)"
3. "Around the World in 80 Presets"

== Singles ==
The album spawned six singles released between October 1989 and November 1990.

- "Another Day in Paradise" – US #1, UK #2 (1989)
- "I Wish It Would Rain Down" – US #3, UK #7 (1990)
- "Something Happened on the Way to Heaven" – US #4, UK #15 (1990)
- "Do You Remember?" – US #4 (1990)
- "That's Just The Way It Is" – UK #26 (1990)
- "Hang in Long Enough" – US #23, UK #34 (1990)

In Canada, "Another Day in Paradise", "I Wish It Would Rain Down", "Do You Remember?", and "Something Happened on the Way to Heaven" reached No. 1.

== Release ==
In the UK, ...But Seriously spent 15 non-consecutive weeks at No. 1, including the whole competitive Christmas season, and at the end of 1989 became the third best-selling album of the year in the country after only six weeks on sale. It became the best-selling album of 1990 in the UK. In 2019, it was named as the 39th best-selling album of all time on the official UK chart and the only Collins or Genesis album in the top 60.

...But Seriously also peaked at No. 1 on the US Billboard 200 for four weeks and became the second best-selling album of 1990 in the US, according to Billboard. It was the last number one album of the 1980s and the first of the 1990s in the UK and in the US.

In Germany, it is the second best-selling album in the chart history of certified albums, and the best-selling album within the foreign repertoire.

== Critical reception ==
Professional ratings
Review scores
Source	Rating
AllMusic	3/5 stars
Classic Pop	6/10
Encyclopedia of Popular Music	3/5 stars
PopMatters	5/10
Mojo	3/5 stars
MusicHound	3.5/5
NME	6/10
Record Mirror	2.5/5
Rolling Stone	2/5 stars
Smash Hits	6½/10

"Another Day in Paradise"
Collins' last of seven American number one songs.

In his review for AllMusic, Geoff Orens praised the decision to use more live instrumentation than No Jacket Required, saying "there's no doubt that tracks such as 'Find a Way to My Heart' and 'Hang in Long Enough' have enough bite to outlast his more dated sounding mid-80s material." He criticised the album for "too many generic ballads", but added that "when Collins moves out of his formula", citing "the dramatic gospel-influenced 'I Wish it Would Rain Down', [...] the results are staggering." In 2014, Corey Deiterman wrote for Houston Press, "One need only look at his album ...But Seriously to see some of the blueprint for being serious without being boring. That album wasn't perfect, by any means, and nowhere near as good as his preceding three records, but it allowed Collins to delve into serious subject matter and more serious musical territory while also retaining the sense of slick, fun pop he had traded in throughout the '80s."

Writing for NME in 2016, Mark Beaumont included it on his list of eight of the all-time best-selling albums in the UK to have "no redeeming features whatsoever", calling the album the "beginning of Collins' solo rot". He criticised "Another Day in Paradise" and called the album "a drab bag of half-arsed white-soul donkeyshit", highlighting "Father to Son" as the worst moment, describing it as "the sound of one of rock's most celebrated drummers singing along to percussion that sounds like someone with erratic wind issues popping their finger in their cheek".

== Accolades ==
At the 33rd Annual Grammy Awards "Another Day in Paradise" won the award for Record of the Year. ...But Seriously received further nominations for Album of the Year, Producer of the Year (Non-Classical) and Best Engineered Recording – Non-Classical. "Another Day in Paradise" was further nominated for Song of the Year and Best Pop Vocal Performance, Male, while the instrumental piece "Saturday Night and Sunday Morning" was nominated for Best Pop Instrumental Performance.

...But Seriously received two American Music Awards for Favorite Pop/Rock Album and Favorite Pop/Rock Male Artist.

At the Brit Awards in 1990 "Another Day in Paradise" received the award for British Single, while Collins was named British Male Artist, for which he was nominated again a year later.

== Tour ==
In support of the album, Collins' embarked on a worldwide tour, called Seriously Live!. In total, there were 113 shows over three continents and it led to the release of a live album and video Serious Hits... Live!.

== Track listing ==
=== CD and cassette ===
All tracks are written by Phil Collins, except where noted.

No.	Title	Writer(s)	Length
1.	"Hang in Long Enough"		4:44
2.	"That's Just the Way It Is"		5:20
3.	"Do You Remember?"		4:36
4.	"Something Happened on the Way to Heaven"	Collins; Daryl Stuermer	4:52
5.	"Colours"		8:51
6.	"I Wish It Would Rain Down"		5:28
7.	"Another Day in Paradise"		5:22
8.	"Heat on the Street"		3:51
9.	"All of My Life"		5:36
10.	"Saturday Night and Sunday Morning"	Collins; Thomas Washington	1:26
11.	"Father to Son"		3:28
12.	"Find a Way to My Heart"		6:08

=== LP ===
The vinyl release features a rearranged track listing and is missing two tracks from the CD/cassette version, "Heat on the Street" and the instrumental "Saturday Night and Sunday Morning".

This listing applies only to original 1989 releases of the album. Vinyl releases of 2016 remaster feature all tracks and the same track listing as for CD and cassette releases, split between two discs, three tracks per side.

Side one
No.	Title	Length
1.	"Hang in Long Enough"	4:44
2.	"That's Just the Way It Is"	5:20
3.	"Find a Way to My Heart"	6:08
4.	"Colours"	8:51
5.	"Father to Son"	3:28

Side two
No.	Title	Writer(s)	Length
1.	"Another Day in Paradise"		5:22
2.	"All of My Life"		5:36
3.	"Something Happened on the Way to Heaven"	Collins; Stuermer	4:52
4.	"Do You Remember?"		4:36
5.	"I Wish It Would Rain Down"		5:28

=== 2016 bonus tracks ===
No.	Title	Writer(s)	Length
1.	"Hang in Long Enough" (live 1997)		4:52
2.	"Something Happened on the Way to Heaven" (live 2004)	Collins; Stuermer	5:26
3.	"Colours" (live 1990)		11:20
4.	"Saturday Night and Sunday Morning" (live 1990)	Collins; Washington	1:54
5.	"Always" (live 1990)	Irving Berlin	4:30
6.	"Find a Way to My Heart" (live 1997)		5:40
7.	"That's How I Feel" (B-side)		5:05
8.	"You've Been in Love (That Little Bit Too Long)" (B-side)		4:49
9.	"Another Day in Paradise" (demo)		5:21
10.	"That's Just the Way It Is" (demo)		4:54
11.	"I Wish It Would Rain Down" (demo)		5:30
12.	"Hang in Long Enough" (demo)		4:34
13.	"Do You Remember?" (demo)		4:43

== Personnel ==
Adapted from liner notes.

Musicians

- Phil Collins – vocals (tracks 1–9, 11, 12), keyboards (1–9, 11, 12), drums (1, 4–12), drum machine (2, 3, 7, 11), percussion (2, 3, 10, 12), tambourine (6, 8)
- Steve Winwood – Hammond organ (track 9)
- Daryl Stuermer – guitar (tracks 1–4, 8, 11, 12)
- Dominic Miller – guitar (tracks 1, 4, 5, 7, 9)
- Eric Clapton – guitar (track 6)
- Nathan East – bass (tracks 1, 4)
- Leland Sklar – bass (tracks 2, 5, 7–12)
- Pino Palladino – bass (tracks 3, 6)
- The Phenix Horns (tracks 1, 4, 5, 10, 12):
  - Don Myrick – saxophone, alto sax solo (track 9)
  - Louis Satterfield – trombone
  - Harry Kim – trumpet
  - Rhamlee Michael Davis – trumpet
- Alex Brown, Marva King and Lynne Fiddmont – backing vocals (tracks 1, 4, 8, 9)
- David Crosby – vocals (tracks 2, 7)
- Stephen Bishop – vocals (track 3)

Production

- Phil Collins – producer, mixing
- Hugh Padgham – producer, mixing, engineer
- Ed Goodreau – assistant engineer (Los Angeles)
- Simon Osbourne – assistant engineer
- Tom Tom 84 – horn arrangements
- Maurice Spears – music preparation
- Trevor Key – photography

== Charts ==
=== Weekly charts ===
Chart (1989–1990)	Peak position
Australian Albums (ARIA)	1
Austrian Albums (Ö3 Austria)	1
Belgian Albums (IFPI)	1
Canada Top Albums/CDs (RPM)	1
Danish Albums (Hitlisten)	1
Dutch Albums (Album Top 100)	1
European Albums (Music & Media)	1
Finnish Albums (Suomen virallinen lista)	1
French Albums (SNEP)	1
German Albums (Offizielle Top 100)	1
Greek Albums (IFPI)	1
Hungarian Albums (MAHASZ)	4
Icelandic Albums (Tónlist)	1
Irish Albums (IRMA)	1
Italian Albums (Musica e dischi)	1
Japanese Albums (Oricon)	14
New Zealand Albums (RMNZ)	1
Norwegian Albums (VG-lista)	1
Portuguese Albums (AFP)	1
Spanish Albums (AFYVE)	1
Swedish Albums (Sverigetopplistan)	1
Swiss Albums (Schweizer Hitparade)	1
UK Albums (Official Charts)	1
US Billboard 200	1

Chart (2016)	Peak position
French Albums (SNEP)	144
Italian Albums (FIMI)	62

=== Year-end charts ===
Chart (1989)	Position
French Albums (SNEP)	5
UK Albums (OCC)	3

Chart (1990)	Position
Australian Albums (ARIA)	14
Austrian Albums (Ö3 Austria)	2
Canada Top Albums/CDs (RPM)	2
Dutch Albums (Album Top 100)	2
European Albums (Music & Media)	1
German Albums (Offizielle Top 100)	1
New Zealand Albums (RMNZ)	4
Swiss Albums (Schweizer Hitparade)	1
US Billboard 200	2

== Certifications and sales ==
Region	Certification	Certified units/sales
Argentina (CAPIF)	3× Platinum	180,000^{^}
Australia (ARIA)	5× Platinum	350,000^{^}
Austria (IFPI Austria)	2× Platinum	100,000^{*}
Belgium (BRMA)	2× Platinum	100,000^{*}
Brazil (Pro-Música Brasil)	Gold	100,000^{*}
Canada (Music Canada)	7× Platinum	700,000^{^}
Chile	5× Platinum	
Denmark (IFPI Danmark)	2× Platinum	160,000^{^}
Finland (Musiikkituottajat)	Platinum	74,715
France (SNEP)	Diamond	2,000,000
Germany (BVMI)	6× Platinum	3,000,000^{^}
Hong Kong (IFPI Hong Kong)	Platinum	20,000^{*}
Italy (FIMI)	3× Platinum	750,000
Italy (FIMI) sales since 2009	Gold	25,000^{‡}
Japan (RIAJ)	Platinum	200,000^{^}
Netherlands (NVPI)	2× Platinum	400,000
New Zealand (RMNZ)	Platinum	15,000^{^}
Norway (IFPI Norway)	Platinum	50,000^{*}
Portugal (AFP)	2× Platinum	80,000^{^}
South Africa	—	300,000
Spain (Promusicae)	7× Platinum	750,000
Sweden (GLF)	Gold	50,000^{^}
Switzerland (IFPI Switzerland)	5× Platinum	250,000^{^}
United Kingdom (BPI)	9× Platinum	2,750,000
United States (RIAA)	4× Platinum	4,000,000^{^}
^{*} Sales figures based on certification alone.^{^} Shipments figures based on certification alone.^{‡} Sales+streaming figures based on certification alone.

== See also ==
- List of best-selling albums by country
- List of best-selling albums in France
- List of best-selling albums in Germany
- List of best-selling albums in Italy
- List of best-selling albums in Spain
- List of best-selling albums in the United Kingdom
