= Daryl Stuermer =

American musician (born 1952)

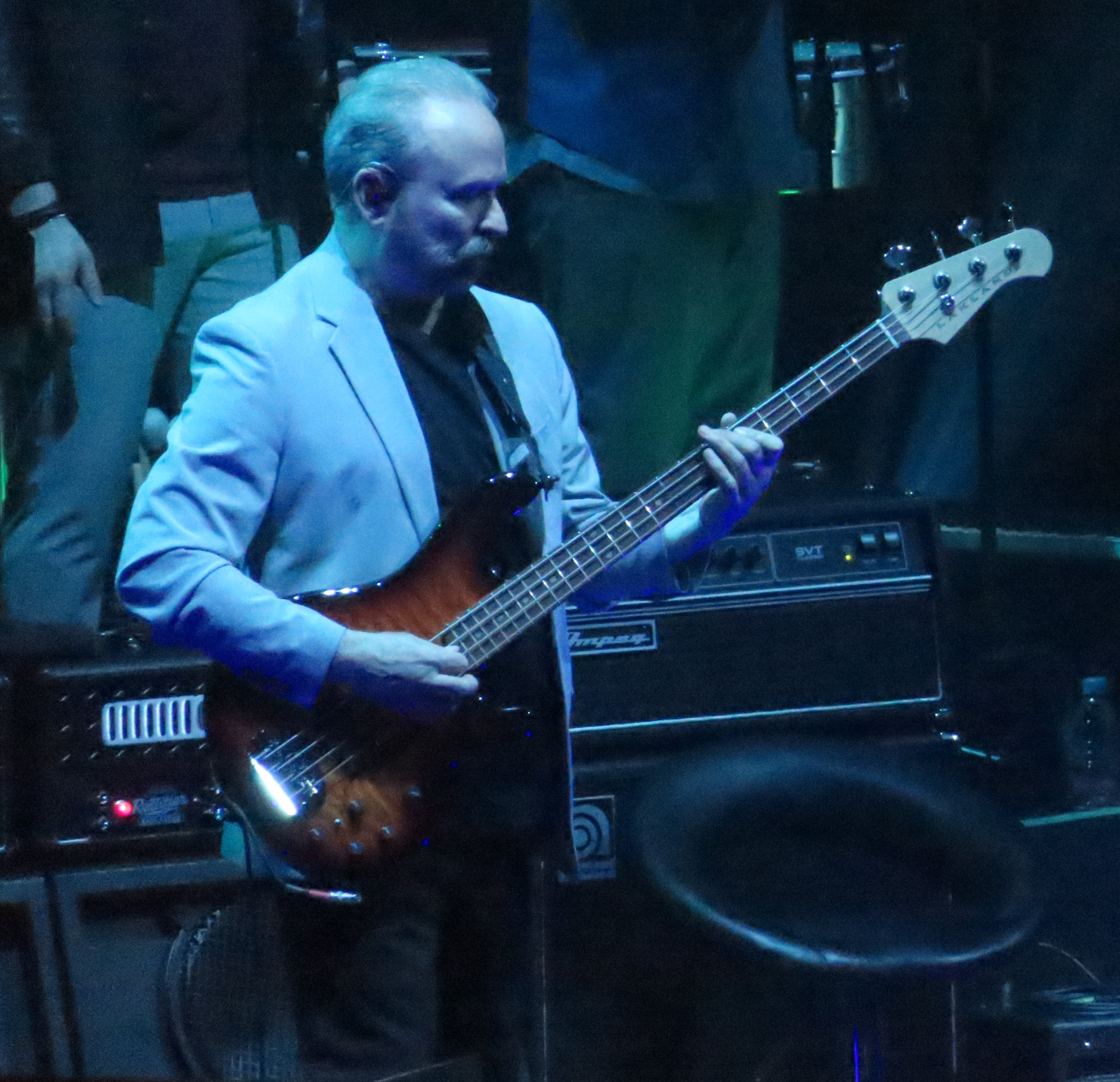
- Stuermer performing with Genesis in 2022

Background information
- Born: November 27, 1952 (age 73); Milwaukee, Wisconsin, U.S.
- Genres: Progressive rock; rock; jazz fusion; pop rock; instrumental rock
- Instruments: Guitar; bass
- Years active: 1970–present
- Member of: Era
- Website: darylstuermer.com

Daryl Mark Stuermer (born November 27, 1952) is an American musician, songwriter, singer, and record producer best known for playing the guitar and bass for Genesis during live shows, and lead guitar for Phil Collins during most solo tours and albums. He has also released nine solo albums, and tours with his Daryl Stuermer Band.

== Early life ==
Stuermer was born on November 27, 1952, in Milwaukee, Wisconsin. He cites Duane, his elder brother of two years, also a musician, who introduced him to music by Elvis Presley and Ray Charles. As a youngster he became a fan of the instrumental rock band The Ventures, which "really got me going". He began to play the guitar at age eleven, and moved into jazz guitar four years later. In 1970, Stuermer graduated from St. Francis High School in St. Francis, Wisconsin.

== Career ==
=== Early bands ===
In the early 1970s, Stuermer formed his Milwaukee-based jazz rock band Sweetbottom, playing local gigs five nights a week. It was during one of these gigs in 1975 that keyboardist George Duke, then of The Mothers of Invention with Frank Zappa, noticed him and suggested his name to jazz violinist Jean-Luc Ponty, who was looking for a guitarist to join his own band. After a successful audition, Stuermer became a full time member and is featured on three of their albums released between 1975 and 1977: Aurora, Imaginary Voyage, and Enigmatic Ocean.

In addition to Ponty, he played on Duke's solo albums I Love the Blues, She Heard My Cry and Liberated Fantasies.

=== Genesis ===
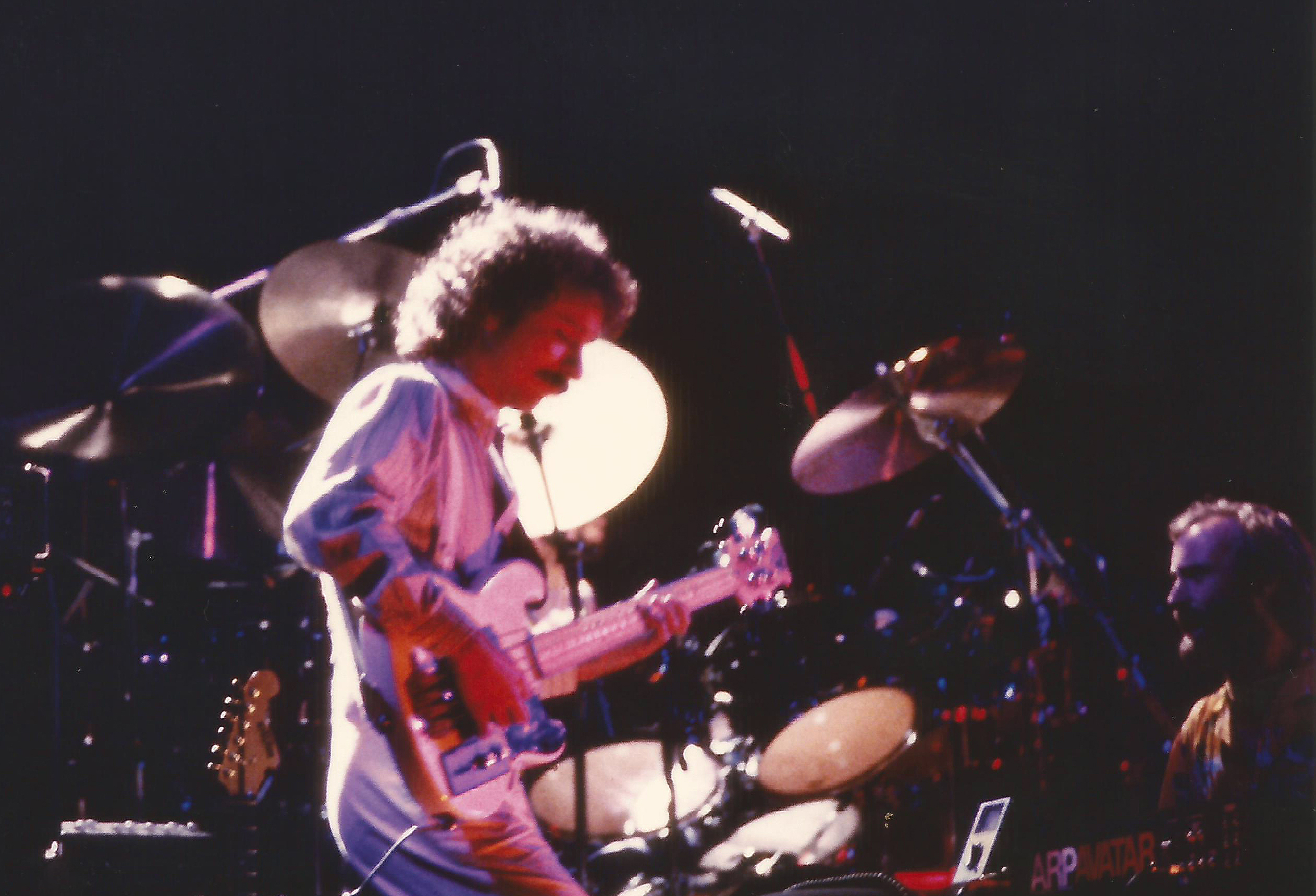
Stuermer in 1980 performing with Genesis

In late 1977, Stuermer, at the insistence of his friend Alphonso Johnson, was recommended as a replacement for Steve Hackett to support Genesis for live performances. Johnson's audition was unsuccessful, and he put Stuermer's name forward. Stuermer's only exposure to the band was when Ponty played him A Trick of the Tail, and a television clip showing Peter Gabriel singing in costume. A chance meeting with drummer Chester Thompson, who had replaced Bill Bruford as their touring drummer in 1976, convinced Stuermer to go for the audition. His audition with Mike Rutherford took place in early 1978 in New York City, and he landed the spot on the same day. He typically played lead guitar on the Gabriel/Hackett era songs, while playing rhythm guitar/bass on the Banks/Collins/Rutherford era songs. He retained the role of lead guitarist and bass player with the band from 1978 to 1992: he also rejoined them for the 2007 Turn It On Again Tour, and returned for the 2021–22 The Last Domino? Tour.

=== Solo career ===
During Genesis's break in activity for much of 1979, Stuermer secured work by touring North America with singer Gino Vannelli in support of his album Brother to Brother.

In 1981, Stuermer followed Genesis frontman Phil Collins as lead guitarist for Collins' solo career, with a speaking part in the clip for "One More Night" and being mentioned by name in the music video for "Don't Lose My Number". In doing so, he transitioned from what Collins called a "permanent-temporary-part-time member" of Genesis to a "permanent-touring-recording member" of Collins' new group. Stuermer is credited as a writer on several songs that Collins recorded, including "Something Happened on the Way to Heaven" on ...But Seriously, and "I Don't Wanna Know" on No Jacket Required, which evolved from one of Stuermer's demos.

In 1988, Stuermer released his debut solo album Steppin' Out. He considered making it a more vocal-oriented album having performed with Collins throughout the decade, but he opted to produce a rock instrumental album.

Stuermer went on to record Live and Learn, Another Side of Genesis, Waiting in the Wings, Retrofit, The Nylon String Sampler, Rewired: the Electric Collection and Go!. Released in 2002 was a Sweetbottom live reunion album, recorded at Shank Hall in Milwaukee, Wisconsin.

Stuermer's album Go! was released in early 2007. It contains many older tracks from Stuermer's Sweetbottom days, and includes appearances from Alphonso Johnson, Kostia, John Calarco, and Eric Hervey. Stuermer released the album on Inside Out Records as they offered him greater freedom to explore a musical direction that he wished to pursue. His current project is called Daryl Stuermer − Symphony Concert, which involves band members Kostia, Alan Arber and Eric Hervey and singer Forrest "Woody" Mankowski, recreating classic Genesis material mixed with instrumentals from his solo career.

== Equipment ==
Stuermer has been a Fender Stratocaster user for most of his career with Phil Collins. His primary guitars have been a Torino Red Eric Clapton Stratocaster and a 3-Tone Sunburst American Standard Stratocaster, though he also played banjo on the Collins song "The Roof Is Leaking". In addition to the Fender Stratocaster in his tenure with Collins and Genesis, he played Gibson RD Artist bass guitars and Ibanez electric guitars in 1978. He then switched to a SUNTECH Model SA-MFSC "Stratocaster Style" guitar from 1978 to 1984 and used a Shergold Bass Guitar (1980), a Fender Precision Bass guitar in 1981/1982, a Strata (Status Graphite) bass guitar and a Roland guitar (1983–84), a Steinberger bass guitar and guitar (1986/1987), a Yamaha bass guitar in 1992 and a Lakland custom bass guitar in 2007. Stuermer used a Gibson ES-346 in 2004/2005, and as of 2007 he has largely been using a Godin LGXT electric guitar. He also uses a Godin Montreal Premier, a Godin DS-1 (a custom guitar that Godin built for Stuermer) and a Sadowsky nylon string electric guitar.

== Discography ==
Solo albums

Title	Release	Label
Steppin' Out	1988	GRP
Live & Learn	1998	Urban Island Music
Another Side of Genesis	2000	Urban Island Music
Waiting in the Wings	2001	Urban Island Music
Sweetbottom Live the Reunion	2003	Urban Island Music
Retrofit	2004	Urban Island Music
The Nylon String Sampler	2005	Urban Island Music
Rewired – The Electric Collection	2006	Unicorn Digital/Urban Island, LL
GO!	2007	Inside Out Music
Breaking Cover	2016	Urban Island Music

With Jean-Luc Ponty

Title	Release	Label
Aurora	1975	Atlantic
Imaginary Voyage	1976	Atlantic
Enigmatic Ocean	1977	Atlantic
Civilized Evil	1980	Atlantic

With George Duke

Title	Release	Label
I Love The Blues She Heard My Cry	1975	Polydor
Liberated Fantasies	1976	BASF

With Joan Armatrading

Title	Release	Label
The Key	1983	A&M

With Frida Lyngstad (ABBA)

Title	Release	Label
Something's Going On	1982	Epic (UK)

With Tony Banks (Genesis)

Title	Release	Label
The Fugitive	1983	Charisma
Still	1991	Giant (US), Virgin (EU)
Strictly Inc	1995	Virgin

With Mike Rutherford

Title	Release	Label
Acting Very Strange	1982	Atlantic/WEA

With Philip Bailey

Title	Release	Label
Chinese Wall	1984	Columbia

With Phil Collins

Title	Release	Label
Face Value	1981	Virgin
Hello, I Must Be Going!	1982	Atlantic
No Jacket Required	1985	Atlantic
...But Seriously	1989	Atlantic
Serious Hits... Live!	1990	Atlantic
Dance into the Light	1996	Atlantic
A Hot Night in Paris	1998	Atlantic
...Hits	1998	Atlantic
Testify	2002	Atlantic
The First Final Farewell Tour	2004	Warner Music Vision
Phil Collins: Roseland Ballroom	2010	Eagle Vision

With Genesis

Title	Release	Label
Three Sides Live	1982	Atlantic
Knebworth Concert (Various Artists)	1990	Polydor
Genesis Live-The Way We Walk Vol 1	1992	Atlantic
Genesis Live-The Way We Walk Vol 2	1993	Atlantic
Live Over Europe 2007	2007	Atlantic

Collaborations

- 1986: Marilyn Martin from Marilyn Martin − composed and performed on track "Wildest Dreams"
- 2004: Crossing the Jordan − producer
- 2015: 1985 from Martin Levac − performed on track "I am sorry"
