= Hugh Padgham =

English record producer (born 1955)

- Born: Hugh Charles Padgham; 15 February 1955 (age 71); Amersham, Buckinghamshire, England
- Genres: Rock; electronic; new wave; pop rock; synth-pop; soft rock
- Occupations: Record producer; audio engineer
- Years active: 1978–present
- Labels: A&M; Island; Universal; London; London UK; Major
- Spouse: Cath Kidston (m. 2012)

Hugh Charles Padgham (/ˌpædʒɛm/; born 15 February 1955) is an English record producer and audio engineer. He has won four Grammy Awards, for Producer of the Year and Album of the Year for 1985, Record of the Year for 1990, and Engineer of the Year for 1993. Padgham's co-productions include hits by Phil Collins, XTC, Genesis, the Human League, Sting, and the Police. He pioneered (with Peter Gabriel and producer Steve Lillywhite) the "gated reverb" drum sound used most famously on Collins' 1981 song "In the Air Tonight".

== Early life ==
Hugh Charles Padgham was born on 15 February 1955 in Amersham, Buckinghamshire. He was educated at St Edward's School, Oxford.

== Career ==
Padgham became interested in record production after listening to Elton John's Tumbleweed Connection (1970). He started out as a tape operator at Advision Studios, working on many recording sessions including Mott the Hoople and Gentle Giant. From there he went to Lansdowne Studios and moved from tape-operator/assistant engineer to engineer. In 1978, Padgham got a job at The Townhouse, where he engineered and/or produced acts including XTC, Peter Gabriel and Phil Collins. He also worked on the second album by Killing Joke.

Padgham's previous work with Gabriel and Collins led to a collaboration with Genesis and Phil Collins in the 1980s, which produced the albums: Face Value, Abacab (both 1981), Hello, I Must Be Going! (1982), Genesis (1983), No Jacket Required (1985), Invisible Touch (1986), and ...But Seriously (1989). In addition to his work with Genesis and XTC, Padgham co-produced two albums with the Police: Ghost in the Machine (1981) and Synchronicity (1983), as well as some of Police frontman Sting's solo work. He also worked on Paul McCartney's Press to Play (1986) and the Human League's Hysteria (1984).

In the 2000s, Padgham worked with Sting as well as McFly. He had four UK number one hits in 2005 and 2006 with McFly, as well as a number of other Top Ten Singles. In 2002, Padgham produced the Tragically Hip album In Violet Light.

In 2019, Padgham was honoured in London with the MPG Award for Outstanding Contribution to UK Music.

Padgham is one of the owners of the indie label Gearbox Records.

== The "gated drum" sound ==
Padgham is credited with co-creating the "gated reverb" drum sound used so prominently on Phil Collins' single "In the Air Tonight", which became the template for much of the recorded pop drum sound of the 1980s. The effect is believed to have first been used on the 1980 third self-titled solo album by Peter Gabriel, which Padgham engineered and on which Collins played. At this time, Padgham was working regularly as the recording engineer for producer Steve Lillywhite, and they collaborated on many well-known albums and singles in the early 1980s.

Padgham's gated drum effect is created by adding a large amount of heavily compressed room ambience to the original drum sound, and then feeding that reverb signal through an electronic device known as a noise gate. This unit can be programmed to cut off any signal fed through it, either after a specified time interval (in this case, some tens of milliseconds), or when the incoming signal falls below a preset gain threshold. The result is the arresting 'gated reverb' effect, in which the reverberation cuts off abruptly, rather than fading away.

In a 2006 interview, Padgham revealed how the effect was first engineered:

The whole thing came through the famous "listen mic" on the SSL console. The SSL had put this massive compressor on it because the whole idea was to hang one mic in the middle of the studio and hear somebody talking on the other side. And it just so happened that we turned it on one day when Phil [Collins] was playing his drums. And then I had the idea of feeding that back into the console and putting the noise gate on, so when he stopped playing it sucked the big sound of the room into nothing.

== Personal life ==
Padgham married his long-term partner Cath Kidston in 2012. He has a daughter from a previous marriage.

== Collaborators ==
Artists for whom Padgham has produced or engineered include:

- 311 (Soundsystem)
- Bee Gees
- David Bowie (Tonight) (1984)
- Kate Bush
- Toni Childs
- Clannad
- Paula Cole
- Phil Collins (Face Value, Hello, I Must Be Going!, No Jacket Required, ...But Seriously, Dance into the Light)
- Julian Cope
- Sheryl Crow
- The Dream Academy
- Melissa Etheridge
- Mick Farren
- Julia Fordham
- The Fixx
- Peter Gabriel (engineer, Peter Gabriel)
- Genesis (Abacab, Genesis, Invisible Touch)
- Johnny Warman
- Hall & Oates
- Nicky Holland
- The Human League
- I Was a Cub Scout
- Elton John
- The Lightyears
- Mike Lindup (Changes, 1990)
- Anni-Frid Lyngstad (engineer)
- Madness (mixing, 1988)
- Mansun
- Paul McCartney
- Mummy Calls
- McFly
- Northern Pikes (Snow in June, 1990)
- Youssou N'Dour
- The Police (Ghost in the Machine, Synchronicity)
- The Psychedelic Furs
- Kim Richey (1999 album Glimmer)
- L. Shankar
- Spandau Ballet
- Split Enz (Time and Tide, Conflicting Emotions)
- Sting
- Sweet
- Tears for Fears
- The Tragically Hip (In Violet Light, 2002)
- Van der Graaf Generator (mixing, 2010)
- Suzanne Vega
- The Waitresses
- Brian Wilson
- XTC (engineer, 1979, 1980, 1982)
- Yes (Drama)
- Paul Young
- Frank Zappa

== Awards ==
=== Grammy Awards ===
Year Awarded	Nominee/work	Category	Result	Ref.
1984	Synchronicity (The Police)	Album of the Year (shared with The Police)	Nominated	
1984	"Every Breath You Take" (The Police)	Record of the Year (shared with The Police)	Nominated	
1986	No Jacket Required (Phil Collins)	Album of the Year (shared with Phil Collins)	Won	
1986	No Jacket Required (Phil Collins)	Producer of the Year (Non-Classical) (shared with Phil Collins)	Won	
1991	...But Seriously (Phil Collins)	Album of the Year (shared with Phil Collins)	Nominated	
1991	...But Seriously (Phil Collins)	Producer of the Year (Non-Classical) (shared with Phil Collins)	Nominated	
1991	...But Seriously (Phil Collins)	Best Engineered Recording – Non-Classical	Nominated	
1991	"Another Day in Paradise" (Phil Collins)	Record of the Year (shared with Phil Collins)	Won	
1994	Ten Summoner's Tales (Sting)	Album of the Year (shared with Sting)	Nominated	
1994	Ten Summoner's Tales (Sting)	Producer of the Year (Non-Classical)	Nominated	
1994	Ten Summoner's Tales (Sting)	Best Engineered Recording – Non-Classical	Won	
1994	"If I Ever Lose My Faith in You" (Sting)	Record of the Year (shared with Sting)	Nominated	
1997	Mercury Falling (Sting)	Best Pop Album (shared with Sting)	Nominated	

=== Brit Awards ===
Year Awarded	Nominee/work	Category	Result	Ref.
1986	No Jacket Required (Phil Collins)	British Producer	Nominated	
1987	Invisible Touch (Genesis)	British Producer	Nominated	

BASCA

Year Awarded	Nominee	Category	Result	Ref.
2009	Himself	Gold Badge Award	Won	
