= Phil Collins discography =

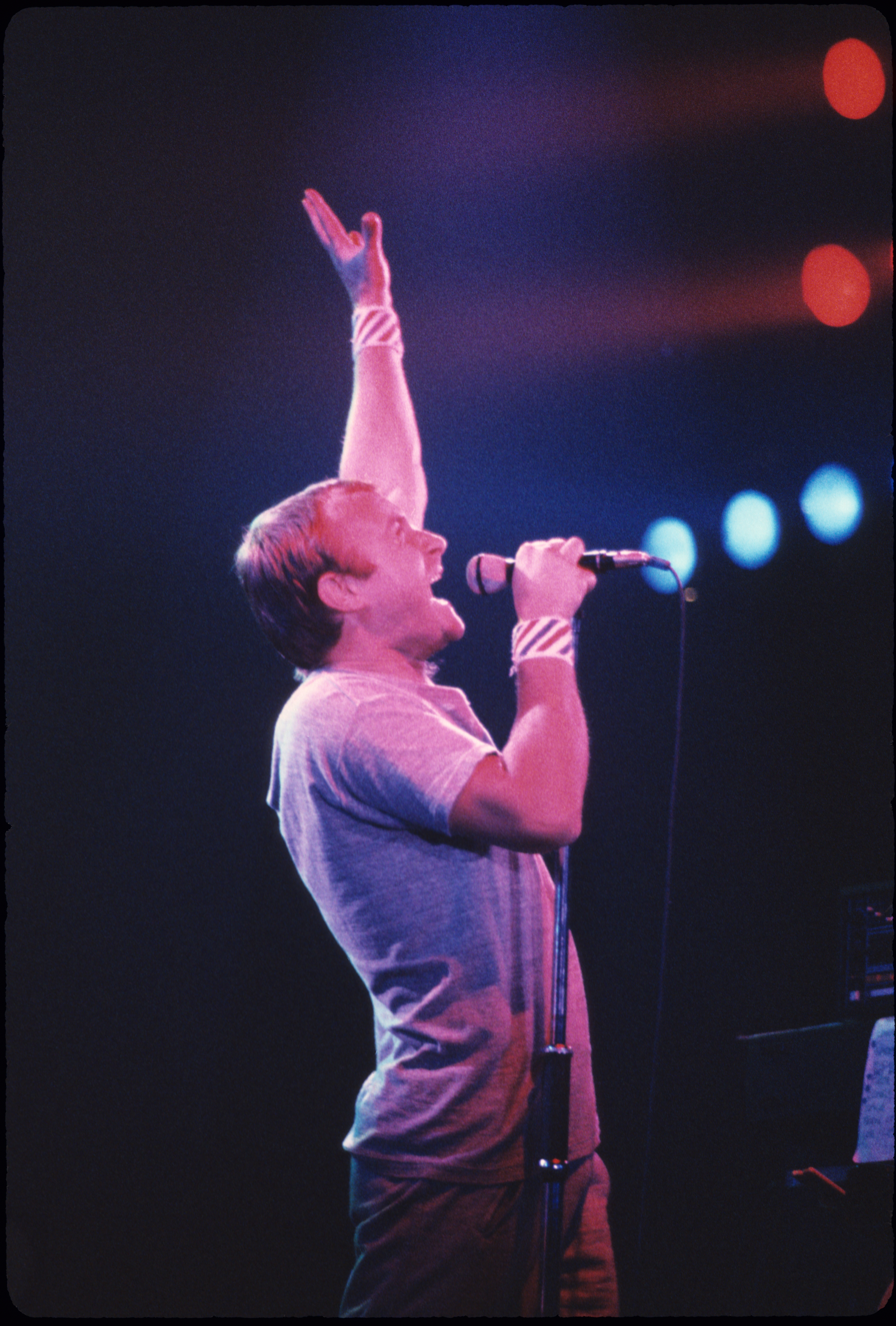
- Phil Collins performing with Genesis in 1981
- Studio albums: 8
- Extended plays: 1
- Live albums: 2
- Compilation albums: 5
- Singles: 50
- Video albums: 18
- Music videos: 41
- Soundtrack albums: 3
- Box sets: 2
- Remix albums: 2

English musician Phil Collins has released 8 studio albums, 2 live albums, 5 compilation albums, 2 remix albums, 3 soundtrack albums, 2 box sets, 50 singles, 18 video albums, and 41 music videos. A Grammy and Academy Award-winning solo artist, Collins has sold more than 34.5 million albums in the United States, and 150 million records worldwide.

Collins's first solo album, Face Value, was released in the United Kingdom in 1981 and reached number one in the United Kingdom, Canada, and Sweden. It was also certified 5-times Platinum by the British Phonographic Industry (BPI). The album's lead single, "In the Air Tonight", reached number one in Austria, Germany, Ireland, New Zealand, Sweden, and Switzerland, and is often cited as his signature song. His second album, Hello, I Must Be Going!, was released in 1982 and included the UK number one "You Can't Hurry Love", which also topped the charts in Ireland and the Netherlands. The album went number one in Canada while peaking at number two in the UK and receiving a triple-platinum certification from the BPI. In 1984, Collins recorded "Against All Odds"; the ballad shot to number one on the US Billboard Hot 100 and number two in the UK. He also performed a duet with Philip Bailey, "Easy Lover", which reached number two in the US and spent four weeks at number one in the UK. In 1984, Collins participated in Bob Geldof's Band Aid charity project for the famine in Ethiopia, and played drums in the Band Aid single "Do They Know It's Christmas?".

In 1985, Collins released his third album, No Jacket Required, which contained the hits "Sussudio" and "One More Night". He also recorded the song "Separate Lives", a duet with Marilyn Martin that reached number one in the US. No Jacket Required debuted at number one in the US and UK; it is the best-selling album of his career and has been certified Diamond in the US for sales over 10 million and six-times platinum in the UK. In 1988, Collins contributed songs to the soundtrack of the film Buster, in which he also starred: "Two Hearts", and a cover of "A Groovy Kind of Love", the latter of which became a UK and US number one. In 1989 Collins produced another successful album, ...But Seriously, featuring the anti-homelessness anthem "Another Day in Paradise", which peaked at number one in the US and number two in the UK. A live album, Serious Hits... Live! followed in 1990.

Collins's fifth album, Both Sides, was released in 1993; although it was less successful than his previous albums and produced only one UK top-ten single, the album still reached number one in the UK. His next album, Dance into the Light, was released in 1996 and was even less successful, peaking at number four in the UK and was only certified silver. A greatest hits compilation, ...Hits, was released in 1998 and was successful, returning Collins to UK number one and multi-platinum status in the UK and US. The album's sole new track was a cover of the Cyndi Lauper hit "True Colors". Collins also wrote and performed songs for the Disney animated films Tarzan and Brother Bear. Collins's seventh studio album, Testify, was released in 2002. It was a success in Europe, peaking at number fifteen in the UK and within the top five in Austria, Germany and the Netherlands. After the release of Testify, Collins announced that he was going into semi-retirement, and released two compilation albums in 2004, The Platinum Collection and Love Songs: A Compilation... Old and New. In 2010, Collins released his eighth studio album, Going Back, after which he went into a brief four-year retirement, before returning to the music industry in 2015. By 2016, Collins remastered and reissued all of his studio albums and released his fourth compilation album, The Singles.

== Albums ==
=== Studio albums ===
List of albums, with selected chart positions, and certifications
Title	Album details	Peak chart positions										Certifications
Title	Album details	UK	AUS	AUT	CAN	GER	NLD	NZ	SWE	SWI	US	Certifications
Face Value	Released: 13 February 1981; UK label: Virgin; US label: Atlantic/WEA; Formats: CD, LP, cassette	1	2	3	1	2	2	4	1	2	7	BPI: 5× Platinum; ARIA: 4× Platinum; BVMI: 7× Gold; IFPI AUT: Platinum; IFPI SWI: 2× Platinum; MC: Diamond; NVPI: 2× Platinum; RIAA: 5× Platinum
Hello, I Must Be Going!	Released: 5 November 1982; UK label: Virgin; US label: Atlantic/WEA; Formats: CD, LP, cassette	2	15	—	1	6	3	20	7	17	8	BPI: 3× Platinum; BVMI: 2× Platinum; IFPI AUT: Gold; IFPI SWI: Platinum; NVPI: Gold; RIAA: 3× Platinum
No Jacket Required	Released: 18 February 1985; UK label: Virgin; US label: Atlantic/WEA; Formats: CD, LP, cassette	1	1	11	1	1	1	1	1	1	1	BPI: 6× Platinum; ARIA: Platinum; BVMI: 3× Platinum; IFPI AUT: Platinum; IFPI SWI: 2× Platinum; MC: Diamond; NVPI: Platinum; RIAA: Diamond (12× Platinum)
...But Seriously	Released: 20 November 1989; UK label: Virgin; US label: Atlantic/WEA; Formats: CD, LP, cassette	1	1	1	1	1	1	1	1	1	1	BPI: 9× Platinum; ARIA: 5× Platinum; BVMI: 6× Platinum; IFPI AUT: 2× Platinum; IFPI SWI: 5× Platinum; MC: 7× Platinum; NVPI: Platinum; RIAA: 4× Platinum
Both Sides	Released: 8 November 1993; UK label: Virgin; US label: Atlantic/WEA; Formats: CD, LP, cassette	1	8	1	6	1	1	7	3	1	13	BPI: 2× Platinum; ARIA: Platinum; BVMI: 3× Platinum; IFPI AUT: Platinum; IFPI SWI: Platinum; NVPI: Platinum; RIAA: Platinum
Dance into the Light	Released: 21 October 1996; UK label: Face Value; US label: Atlantic/WEA; Formats: CD, LP, cassette	4	8	2	9	1	4	33	2	1	23	BPI: Gold; ARIA: Gold; BVMI: Platinum; IFPI SWI: 2× Platinum; MC: Platinum; RIAA: Gold
Testify	Released: 11 November 2002; UK label: Face Value; US label: Atlantic/WEA; Formats: CD, LP, cassette	15	96	5	—	3	2	—	4	2	30	BPI: Gold; BVMI: 3× Gold; IFPI AUT: Gold; IFPI SWI: Platinum; NVPI: Platinum
Going Back	Release: 13 September 2010; Label: Atlantic/WEA; Formats: CD, LP, digital download	1	3	3	3	2	1	2	3	4	34	BPI: Gold; BVMI: Platinum; IFPI AUT: Gold; IFPI SWI: Gold; MC: Gold
"—" denotes album that did not chart or was not released

=== Live albums ===
Title	Album details	Peak chart positions										Certifications
Title	Album details	UK	AUS	AUT	CAN	GER	NLD	NZ	SWE	SWI	US	Certifications
Serious Hits... Live!	Released: 5 November 1990; UK label: Virgin; US label: Atlantic/WEA; Formats: CD, cassette, LP	2	5	2	5	1	1	2	16	2	11	BPI: 4× Platinum; ARIA: 3× Platinum; BVMI: 3× Platinum; IFPI AUT: Platinum; IFPI SWI: 2× Platinum; MC: 2× Platinum; NVPI: Platinum; RIAA: 4× Platinum
A Hot Night in Paris (The Phil Collins Big Band)	Released: 18 May 1999; Label: Atlantic/WEA; Formats: CD	—	—	—	—	—	—	—	—	—	—	
"—" denotes album that did not chart or was not released

=== Compilation albums ===
Title	Album details	Peak chart positions										Certifications
Title	Album details	UK	AUS	AUT	CAN	GER	NLD	NZ	SWE	SWI	US	Certifications
...Hits	Released: 5 October 1998; UK label: Virgin; US label: Atlantic/WEA; Formats: CD, cassette	1	2	2	1	2	1	1	1	2	6 (Note: In the US, the album peaked at No. 18 in November 1998; in July 2012, the album re-entered the chart reaching No. 6 when the album price was deeply discounted very briefly by Amazon.com.)	BPI: 6× Platinum; ARIA: 6× Platinum; BVMI: 3× Gold; IFPI AUT: Platinum; IFPI SWI: Platinum; MC: 4× Platinum; NVPI: Platinum; RIAA: 3× Platinum
The Platinum Collection	Released: 31 May 2004; Label: Virgin; Formats: CD	4	—	—	—	—	—	—	—	—	—	BPI: Platinum
Love Songs: A Compilation... Old and New	Released: 1 November 2004; UK label: Virgin; US label: Atlantic/WEA; Formats: CD, digital download	7	37	4	9	8	6	—	7	2	51	BPI: 2× Platinum; BVMI: 3× Gold; IFPI AUT: Gold; IFPI SWI: Platinum; MC: Platinum; RIAA: Gold
The Singles	Released: 14 October 2016; Label: Atlantic/WEA; Formats: CD, LP	2	6	43	47	5	18	27	—	17	44	BPI: 3× Platinum
Other Sides	Released: 31 May 2019; Label: Rhino; Formats: Digital download, streaming	—	—	—	—	—	—	—	—	—	—	

=== Box sets ===
Title	Album details	Peak chart positions					
Title	Album details	UK	AUT	CAN	GER	NLD	SWI
Take a Look at Me Now: The Collection	Released: 29 January 2016; Label: Atlantic/WEA; Formats: CD	50	65	—	9	23	95
Plays Well with Others	Released: 28 September 2018; Label: Atlantic/WEA; Formats: CD	—	—	82	17	—	47
Both Sides (All the Sides)	Released: 20 September 2024; Label: Rhino; Formats: Vinyl	—	—	—	—	—	—

=== Soundtrack albums ===
Title	Album details	Peak chart positions										Certifications
Title	Album details	UK	AUS	AUT	CAN	GER	NLD	NOR	NZ	SWI	US	Certifications
Buster (Various artists including three new Collins tracks)	Released: 19 September 1988; UK label: Virgin; US label: Atlantic/WEA; Formats: CD, LP, cassette	6	35	11	67	4	—	—	—	6	54	BPI: 3× Platinum; RIAA: Gold
Tarzan	Released: 18 May 1999; Label: Walt Disney; Formats: CD, cassette	21	40	9	14	6	51	32	34	11	5	IFPI SWI: Platinum; MC: 2× Platinum; RIAA: 2× Platinum
Brother Bear	Released: 21 October 2003; Label: Walt Disney; Formats: CD, digital download	—	—	7	—	24	38	—	—	50	52	
"—" denotes album that did not chart or was not released

=== Remix albums ===
Title	Album details	Certification
12"ers	Released: 14 October 1987; Label: Atlantic; Formats: CD, cassette	ARIA: Gold
Remixed Sides	Released: 31 May 2019; Label: Rhino; Formats: Digital download	

== Singles ==
=== As lead artist ===
List of singles, with selected chart positions and certifications, showing year released and album name
Single	Year	Peak chart positions										Certifications	Album
Single	Year	UK	AUS	AUT	CAN	GER	IRL	NLD	SWE	SWI	US	Certifications	Album
"In the Air Tonight"	1981	2	3	1	2	1	2	2	1	1	19	BPI: 3× Platinum; BVMI: Gold; RIAA: 3× Platinum; RMNZ: 6× Platinum	Face Value
"I Missed Again"	1981	14	88	—	6	23	12	28	—	—	19		Face Value
"If Leaving Me Is Easy"	1981	17	—	—	—	61	25	—	—	—	—		Face Value
"This Must Be Love" (Note: released in several EU countries, "Thunder and Lightning" was the A-side in Germany and France)	1981	—	—	—	—	—	—	—	—	—	—		Face Value
"Thru These Walls"	1982	56	—	—	—	—	27	48	—	—	—		Hello, I Must Be Going!
"You Can't Hurry Love"	1982	1	3	3	9	3	1	1	6	3	10	BPI: 2× Platinum; RMNZ: 3× Platinum	Hello, I Must Be Going!
"I Don't Care Anymore"	1983	—	—	—	—	—	—	—	—	—	39		Hello, I Must Be Going!
"Don't Let Him Steal Your Heart Away"	1983	45	—	—	—	—	18	—	—	—	—		Hello, I Must Be Going!
"I Cannot Believe It's True" (Note: released in US)	1983	—	—	—	—	—	—	—	—	—	79		Hello, I Must Be Going!
"Why Can't It Wait 'Til Morning"	1983	89	—	—	—	—	—	—	—	—	—		Hello, I Must Be Going!
"It Don't Matter to Me" (Note: released in Netherlands)	1983	—	—	—	—	—	—	46	—	—	—		Hello, I Must Be Going!
"Against All Odds (Take a Look at Me Now)"	1984	2	3	13	1	9	1	12	3	4	1	BPI: 2× Platinum; RIAA: Gold; RMNZ: 2× Platinum	Against All Odds: Music from the Original Motion Picture Soundtrack
"Easy Lover" (with Philip Bailey)	1984	1	74	21	1	5	1	2	10	8	2	BPI: 2× Platinum; MC: Platinum; RIAA: Gold; RMNZ: Platinum	Chinese Wall
"Sussudio"	1985	12	8	—	10	17	14	12	13	9	1	BPI: Gold; RIAA: Gold; RMNZ: Gold	No Jacket Required
"One More Night"	1985	4	2	6	1	10	4	8	—	6	1	BPI: Silver; RIAA: Gold; RMNZ: Gold	No Jacket Required
"Don't Lose My Number"	1985	—	10	—	11	—	—	44	—	—	4		No Jacket Required
"Take Me Home"	1985	19	64	—	23	—	13	—	—	—	7		No Jacket Required
"Long Long Way to Go" (Note: released in New Zealand)	1985	—	—	—	—	—	—	—	—	—	—		No Jacket Required
"Separate Lives" (with Marilyn Martin)	1985	4	14	—	1	50	1	43	—	—	1	BPI: Silver	White Nights: Original Motion Picture Soundtrack
"In the Air Tonight" ('88 Remix)	1988	4	47	4	—	3	6	17	—	—	—		Non-album single
"A Groovy Kind of Love"	1988	1	2	6	1	3	1	2	5	1	1	BPI: Silver; ARIA: Gold; BVMI: Gold; IFPI SWI: Gold; RIAA: Gold; RMNZ: Gold	Buster: The Original Motion Picture Soundtrack
"Two Hearts"	1988	6	13	14	1	3	3	6	—	4	1	BPI: Silver	Buster: The Original Motion Picture Soundtrack
"Another Day in Paradise"	1989	2	11	2	1	1	2	1	1	1	1	BPI: Platinum; ARIA: Gold; BVMI: Gold; RIAA: Gold; RMNZ: 2× Platinum	...But Seriously
"I Wish It Would Rain Down"	1990	7	15	26	1	8	4	4	7	8	3	BPI: Silver; RMNZ: Gold	...But Seriously
"Something Happened on the Way to Heaven"	1990	15	58	—	1	26	8	9	—	26	4	BPI: Silver	...But Seriously
"Do You Remember?" (Note: In US/Can/AUS/JPN, the studio version was released as a single, in other markets it was the live version from Serious Hits...Live!)	1990	57	83	—	1	46	25	20	—	—	4		...But Seriously
"That's Just the Way It Is"	1990	26	—	—	—	51	5	13	—	29	—		...But Seriously
"Hang in Long Enough"	1990	34	—	—	9	—	27	—	—	—	23		...But Seriously
"Who Said I Would"	1991	—	—	—	34	—	—	—	—	—	73		Serious Hits... Live!
"Both Sides of the Story"	1993	7	41	22	2	12	21	8	31	11	25		Both Sides
"Everyday"	1994	15	66	—	8	35	26	28	—	—	24		Both Sides
"We Wait and We Wonder"	1994	45	156	—	43	52	—	36	—	—	125		Both Sides
"Dance into the Light"	1996	9	36	31	7	42	—	14	—	26	45		Dance into the Light
"It's in Your Eyes"	1996	30	74	—	14	—	—	—	—	—	77		Dance into the Light
"No Matter Who"	1997	—	—	—	—	69	—	—	—	—	—		Dance into the Light
"Wear My Hat"	1997	43	—	—	—	81	—	90	—	—	—		Dance into the Light
"The Same Moon" (Note: released in Germany)	1997	—	—	—	—	87	—	—	—	—	—		Dance into the Light
"True Colors"	1998	26	138	20	—	35	—	73	—	—	112		...Hits
"You'll Be in My Heart"	1999	17	43	30	16	20	—	35	—	24	21	BPI: Platinum; RIAA: 2× Platinum; RMNZ: Platinum	Tarzan: An Original Walt Disney Records Soundtrack
"Two Worlds"	1999	—	—	—	—	43	—	—	—	91	—	RIAA: Gold	Tarzan: An Original Walt Disney Records Soundtrack
"Strangers Like Me"	1999	—	149	28	—	29	—	75	—	22	—	BPI: Silver; RIAA: Platinum	Tarzan: An Original Walt Disney Records Soundtrack
"Son of Man"	2000	—	—	—	—	68	—	—	—	—	—	RIAA: Gold	Tarzan: An Original Walt Disney Records Soundtrack
"Can't Stop Loving You"	2002	28	73	23	—	11	—	3	20	23	76		Testify
"Wake Up Call" (Note: UK Double A-side with "The Least You Can Do")	2003	86	—	—	—	87	—	—	—	—	—		Testify
"The Least You Can Do"	2003	86	—	—	—	—	—	78	—	—	—		Testify
"Look Through My Eyes"	2003	61	—	—	—	51	—	18	—	31	—		Brother Bear: An Original Walt Disney Records Soundtrack
"No Way Out"	2004	—	—	—	—	74	—	—	—	—	—		Brother Bear: An Original Walt Disney Records Soundtrack
"On My Way"	2004	—	—	—	—	—	—	—	—	—	—		Brother Bear: An Original Walt Disney Records Soundtrack
"(Love Is Like a) Heatwave"	2010	—	—	52	—	30	—	82	—	—	—		Going Back
"Going Back"	2010	—	—	45	—	49	—	—	—	50	—		Going Back
"—" denotes single that did not chart or was not released in that country

=== Promotional singles and other charted songs ===
Single	Year	Peak chart positions		Album
Single	Year	US Rock	US Adult	Album
"Behind the Lines" (airplay)	1981	58	—	Face Value
"Do You Know, Do You Care?" (airplay)	1982	41	—	Hello, I Must Be Going!
"Like China" (US promo)	1982	17	—	Hello, I Must Be Going!
"The Man With the Horn" (airplay)	1985	38	—	"Sussudio" B-side
"Inside Out" (airplay)	1985	9	—	No Jacket Required
"I Don't Wanna Know" (airplay)	1985	42	—	No Jacket Required
"We Said Hello Goodbye" (airplay)	1988	—	34	Playing for Keeps Soundtrack
"Can't Turn Back the Years"	1994	—	—	Both Sides
"Somewhere"	1996	—	7	The Songs of West Side Story
"Oughta Know By Now" (tour promo EP)	1997	—	—	Dance into the Light
"Come with Me" (US promo)	2003	—	16	Testify
"Driving Me Crazy"	2003	—	—	Testify
"Don't Let Him Steal Your Heart Away" (airplay)	2004	—	5	Love Songs: A Compilation... Old and New
"True Colours" (Rehearsal)	2004	—	—	Love Songs: A Compilation... Old and New
"Tearing and Breaking"	2004	—	—	Love Songs: A Compilation... Old and New
"You Touch My Heart" (airplay)	2005	—	25	Testify

=== As featured artist ===
List of singles, with selected chart positions and certifications, showing year released and album name
Single	Year	Peak chart positions										Certifications	Album
Single	Year	UK	AUS	AUT	CAN	GER	NLD	SWE	SWI	NZ	US	Certifications	Album
"Do They Know It's Christmas?" (as part of Band Aid)	1984	1	1	1	1	1	1	1	1	1	13	BPI: Silver; RIAA: Gold	Now That's What I Call Christmas!
"Hero" (David Crosby featuring Phil Collins)	1993	56	128	—	4	51	—	—	—	32	44		Thousand Roads
"In the Air Tonite" (Lil' Kim featuring Phil Collins)	2001	26	91	8	18	3	30	27	11	—	—	BVMI: Gold	Urban Renewal
"Home" (Bone Thugs-n-Harmony featuring Phil Collins)	2003	19	—	—	—	—	83	—	85	6	—		Thug World Order
"—" denotes releases that did not chart or was not released.

== Videos ==
=== Video albums ===
Year	Details	Certifications (sales thresholds)	Notes
1983	Live at Perkins Palace: Released: June 1983; Studio: Picture Music International (#MVP 99 1043 2); Format: VHS, Laserdisc		A performance from the Hello, I Must Be Going Tour
1983	Video EP: Released: 1983; Studio: Picture Music International (#CMVG 5013); Format: VHS, Laserdisc		A short video collection
1985	No Ticket Required: Released: September 1985; Studio: WEA Music Video (#2 52411-3); Format: VHS, Laserdisc		A performance from the No Jacket Required Tour
1985	No Jacket Required EP: Released: 1985; Studio: Virgin (#VVC 095); Format: VHS, Laserdisc	RIAA: Platinum	Videos for No Jacket Required album
1989	The Singles Collection: Released: November 1989; Studio: Virgin (#VVD 594); Format: VHS, Laserdisc	RIAA: Platinum	A video collection
1990	Seriously Live in Berlin: Released: 29 October 1990; Studio: Warner Music (#9031-72728-3); Format: VHS, Laserdisc	ARIA: Gold; BVMI: Gold; RIAA: Platinum	A performance from the Seriously, Live! Tour
1990	Knebworth '90: Released: December 1990; Studio: Castle Music Pictures (# CMP 2065); Formats: VHS		A performance from the 1990 Knebworth Festival; Genesis' set from the same show was released separately.
1992	...But Seriously, the Videos: Released: 5 May 1992; Studio: Virgin (#VVD 1010); Format: VHS, Laserdisc		Videos for ...But Seriously album
1994	A Closer Look – Both Sides Tour '94: Released: 1994; Studio: Sears; Format: VHS		A tour documentary
1998	Live and Loose in Paris: Released: October 1998; Studio: Warner Vision (#3984 23466-3); Format: VHS, Laserdisc		A performance from the Dance Into The Light Tour
1999	Classic Albums: Face Value: Released: 10 September 1999; Studio: Eagle Rock (#DVD2006); Format: VHS, DVD, Laserdisc		A documentary on the making of the Face Value album
2000	Live and Loose in Paris: Released: 26 June 2000; Studio: Warner Vision (#3984234662); Format: DVD	ARIA: 2× Platinum	Reissue; first time on DVD
2003	A Life Less Ordinary: Released: 9 June 2003; Studio: Sanctuary (#SVEU3031); Format: VHS, DVD		A biographical documentary
2003	Serious Hits... Live!: Released: 25 August 2003; Studio: Warner Vision (#2564604872); Format: DVD	ARIA: Gold; BVMI: Platinum	Reissue of Seriously Live in Berlin; first time on DVD
2004	Finally... The First Farewell Tour: Released: 1 November 2004; Studio: Warner Vision (#2564619822); Format: DVD	BPI: Platinum; ARIA: 3× Platinum; MC: 3× Platinum; BVMI: 11× Gold; IFPI SWI: Gold	A performance from the First Final Farewell Tour
2007	The Long Goodnight – A Film About Phil Collins: Released: 11 June 2007; Studio: Phillip Collins Ltd; Format: DVD		A tour documentary
2010	Going Back – Live at Roseland Ballroom, NYC: Released: 1 November 2010; Studio: Eagle Vision (#EREDV808); Format: DVD, Blu-ray	MC: Gold	A performance from the Going Back tour
2012	Live at Montreux 2004: Released: 23 March 2012; Studio: Eagle Vision (#EREDV939); Format: DVD, Blu-ray		A performance from the First Final Farewell Tour

=== Music videos ===
Year	Song	Director
1981	"In the Air Tonight"	Stuart Orme
1981	"I Missed Again"	Stuart Orme
1982	"Thru These Walls"	Stuart Orme
1982	"You Can't Hurry Love"	Stuart Orme
1983	"I Don't Care Anymore"	Stuart Orme
1983	"Don't Let Him Steal Your Heart Away"	Stuart Orme
1984	"Against All Odds (Take a Look at Me Now)"	Taylor Hackford
1985	"Easy Lover" (Duet with Philip Bailey)	Jim Yukich
1985	"Sussudio"	Jim Yukich
1985	"One More Night"	Jim Yukich
1985	"Don't Lose My Number"	Jim Yukich
1985	"Take Me Home"	Jim Yukich
1985	"Separate Lives"	Jim Yukich
1988	"A Groovy Kind of Love"	Jim Yukich
1988	"Two Hearts" (Version 1)	Jim Yukich
1988	"Two Hearts" (Version 2)	Jim Yukich
1989	"Another Day in Paradise"	Jim Yukich
1990	"I Wish It Would Rain Down"	Jim Yukich
1990	"Do You Remember?"	Jim Yukich
1990	"Something Happened on the Way to Heaven"	Jim Yukich
1990	"That's Just the Way It Is"	Jim Yukich
1990	"Hang in Long Enough"	Jim Yukich
1991	"Who Said I Would" (Live)	Jim Yukich
1993	"Both Sides of the Story"	Jim Yukich
1994	"Everyday"	Jim Yukich
1994	"We Wait and We Wonder"	Jim Yukich
1994	"Can't Turn Back the Years"	Jim Yukich
1996	"Dance into the Light"	Kevin Godley
1997	"No Matter Who"	Jim Yukich
1997	"It's in Your Eyes"	Jim Yukich
1997	"Wear My Hat"	Jim Yukich
1998	"True Colours"	Michael Geoghegan
1999	"Strangers Like Me"	Dani Jacobs
1999	"You'll Be in My Heart"	Kevin Godley
2002	"Can't Stop Loving You"	Cameron Casey
2003	"Wake Up Call"	Jim Yukich
2003	"Look Through My Eyes"	Jim Yukich
2004	"No Way Out"	Norman Watson
2010	"(Love Is Like A) Heatwave"	Brett Sullivan
2010	"Going Back"	Brett Sullivan
2010	"Girl (Why You Wanna Make Me Blue)"	Brett Sullivan

== Other appearances ==
Year	Song	Album
1969	Ark 2 (entire album: drums and vocals)	Ark 2 (Flaming Youth)
1973	"Battles", "Knights (Reprise)", "Stop That!", "Get Out of My Fridge (drums)	Two Sides of Peter Banks (Peter Banks)
1974	"Mother Whale Eyeless" (extra drums)	Taking Tiger Mountain (By Strategy) (Brian Eno)
1974	“Sky at Night” (drums, backing vocals)	Mark I (Empire) [released 1995]
1974	"The Gambler", "Rock Me on the Water", "Don't You Feel It?", "The Snowman", "The Badman", "You Can Leave Your Hat On", "Blind Willie Johnson", "Book of Fool" (drums)	Book of Fool (Eugene Wallace)
1975	"Devil Woman", "6 O'Clock", "You're 16 (I)", "Have You Seen My Baby", "I'm the Greatest", "Sunshine Life for Me (Sail Away Raymond)" (drums)	Sta*rtling Music (David Hentschel)
1975	Eddie Howell Gramophone Record (entire album: drums)	Eddie Howell Gramophone Record (Eddie Howell)
1975	"Star of Sirius" (drums, vibes, percussion, vocals), "Ace Of Wands" (drums), "A Tower Struck Down' (drums), "Shadow of the Hierophant" (drums)	Voyage of the Acolyte (Steve Hackett)
1975	"Sky Saw", "Over Fire Island" (drums) "Zawinul/Lava" (percussion)	Another Green World (Brian Eno)
1975	Helen of Troy (album: drums, along with Timi Donald [exact credits per song are unclear])	Helen of Troy (John Cale)
1975	"Savannah Woman" (percussion)	Teaser (Tommy Bolin)
1975	Dangerous (drums on several tracks, not credited exactly)	Dangerous (Eugene Wallace)
1975	"Bird and Peter", "Cat and Duck", "Grandfather", "Wolf and Duck", "Wolf Stalks", "Peter's Chase", "Rock and Roll Celebration", "Final Theme" (drums) "Pond" (vibes) "Capture of Wolf" (percussion) "Hunters" (cymbals)	Peter and the Wolf (Various)
1975	"I Can't Remember, But Yes" (drums; also on some other tracks, not credited exactly; according to drum sound and drumming technique probably on:) "On My Feet Again", "Time", "Waiting for the Yellow One", "It's Fallen Off", "Rock 'n' Roll Show"	Counterpoints (Argent)
1976	"Skammens terskel" (drums)	Gi meg et hus (Tobben & Ero)
1976	Unorthodox Behavior (entire album: drums)	Unorthodox Behaviour (Brand X)
1976	Vimana (entire album: percussion)	Vimana (Nova)
1977	"God If I Saw Her Now", "Which Way the Wind Blows", "Silver Song" (lead vocals)	The Geese and the Ghost (Anthony Phillips)
1977	Moroccan Roll (entire album: drums) "Sun in the Night" (lead vocals) "...Maybe I'll Lend You Mine After All" (wordless vocals)	Moroccan Roll (Brand X)
1977	"No One Receiving", "Kurt's Rejoinder" (drums)	Before and After Science (Brian Eno)
1978	Moving Home (entire album: drums)	Moving Home (Rod Argent)
1978	"Homage", "Seasons", "Travels", "Captivity" (drums)	The Awakening (Raphael Rudd)
1978	"Aragon", "Patrolling Wire Borders", "M386" (percussion)	Music for Films (Brian Eno)
1978	(percussion)	Variations (Andrew Lloyd Webber)
1979	"Don't Make Waves", "Soho", "Algon (Where an Ordinary Cup of Drinking Chocolate Costs £8,000,000,000)", "Rhesus Perplexus", "...And So to F...", "April" (drums, percussion, vocals) "Wal to Wal" (drums, drum machine)	Product (Brand X)
1979	"Voidarama", "Triumphant Limp" (drums)	Do They Hurt? (Brand X) [released 1980]
1979	Is There Anything About? (entire album: drums)	Is There Anything About? (Brand X) [released 1982]
1979	"Disengage", "North Star" (drums)	Exposure (Robert Fripp)
1979	"Three Brides", "Baracole", "Forest Kingdom", "War", "Lament for the Sea", Miasma Generator" (drums, percussion)	The Pentateuch of the Cosmogony (Dave Greenslade)
1980	"Intruder" (drums, drum pattern) "No Self Control", "And Through the Wire" (drums) "Family Snapshot" (snare drum) "Biko" (surdo)	Peter Gabriel (Peter Gabriel)
1980	"Taurus I.", "Sheba" (drums)	QE2 (Mike Oldfield)
1980	Grace and Danger (entire album: drums, backing vocals)	Grace and Danger (John Martyn)
1981	"Deep Green" (vocals)	Skinningrove Bay (Jack Lancaster)
1981	"Immunity", "Another Stranger" (percussion)	Immunity (Rupert Hine)
1982	Something's Going On (entire album: drums, producer)	Something's Going On (Anni-Frid Lyngstad)
1982	"Innocents In Paradise" (marimba, timbales, tom toms)	Waving Not Drowning (Rupert Hine)
1982	"Burning Down One Side", "Moonlight in Sambrosa", "Pledge Pin", "Worse than Detroit", "Fat Lip", "Mystery Title", "Far Post", "Like I've Never Been Gone"(drums)	Pictures at Eleven (Robert Plant)
1982	Lead Me to the Water "Lead Me to the Water" (drums; also on some other tracks, not exactly credited)	Lead Me to the Water (Gary Brooker)
1983	"Other Arms", "In the Mood", "Messin' with the Mekon", "Thru' with the Two Step", "Horizontal Departure", "Big Log" (drums)	The Principle of Moments (Robert Plant)
1983	"Strip", "Puss 'n Boots" (drums)	Strip (Adam Ant)
1983	"Island Dreamer" (drums)	Scenario (Al Di Meola)
1983	(drums)	I'm not that kind of girl (Marti Webb)
1984	Chinese Wall (entire album: producer, drums) "Photogenic Memory" (Linn, vocoder "I Go Crazy", "Woman" (Simmons drums) "Walking on the Chinese Wall" (Linn, incidental keyboards, backing vocals) "Go" (Linn) "Easy Lover" (lead vocals, incidental keyboards) "Time is a Woman" (Simmons drums, backing vocals) "Children of the Ghetto" (percussion)	Chinese Wall (Philip Bailey)
1984	"Do They Know It's Christmas" (drums, backing vocals)	Do They Know It's Christmas? (Band Aid)
1985	"She's Waiting" (producer, Simmons drums, snare drum) "Same Old Blues" (producer, Simmons drums) "Knock on Wood" (producer, background vocals) "It All Depends" (producer, shaker) "Tangled in Love" (producer) "Never Make You Cry" (producer, backing vocals, shaker) "Just Like a Prisoner" (Producer, drums [right channel]) "Behind the Sun" (producer, synthesizer)	Behind the Sun (Eric Clapton)
1986	August (entire album except track 1: producer, drums, percussion, backing vocals)	August (Eric Clapton)
1986	"No One Is to Blame" (producer, drums, vocals)	Action Replay (Howard Jones)
1986	"Angry" (drums, percussion)	Press to Play (Paul McCartney)
1986	"Because of You" (drums, percussion) "Back It Up" (drums)	Inside Out (Philip Bailey)
1986	"Badge" (Live), "Let It Rain" (Live) (drums)	"Bad Love" (CD single) Eric Clapton [released 1989]
1986	"Typical Male", "Girls" (drums)	Break Every Rule (Tina Turner)
1986	"Watching the World" (drums, backing vocals	Destiny (Chaka Khan)
1986	"Money for Nothing", "Call of the Wild", "Fields of Fire", "No One Is to Blame", Something About You", "I'm Still Standing", "Reach Out", "Better Be Good to Me", "Sailing", "Get Back", "Long Tall Sally", "I Saw Her Standing There" (drums) "In the Air Tonight" (vocals, piano)	Recorded Highlights of the Prince's Trust 10th Anniversary Birthday Party (Various)
1987	"Running in the Family", "If I Was", "Behind the Mask", "Stand By Me", "Misfit", "Wonderful Tonight", "Don't Look Down", "Invisible", "Through the Barricades", "So Strong", "Run to You", "Saturday Night's Alright (For Fighting)", "The Wanderer", "While My Guitar Gently Weeps", "Here Comes the Sun", "With a Little Help from My Friends" (drums) "You've Lost That Lovin' Feeling", "It's the Same Old Song/I Can't Help Myself/Reach Out- I'll Be There" (vocals)	The Prince's Trust Concert 1987 (Various)
1988	"Loco in Acapulco" (drums, co-songwriter, co-producer)	Buster (Soundtrack, The Four Tops)
1988	"You Win Again" (drums)	Plays Well With Others – CD 4 (Bee Gees) [released 2018]
1989	"Bad Love" (drums, backing & harmony vocals)	Journeyman (Eric Clapton)
1989	"Sleeping With Girls" (drums, drum machine, producer) "Walking on Air" (drums, background vocals, producer) "Love at a Distance" (drums, background vocals, producer) "Hall Light" (drums, producer)	Bowling in Paris (Stephen Bishop)
1989	"Woman In Chains" (drums)	The Seeds Of Love (Tears For Fears)
1991	"Burn Down the Mission" (producer, vocals, drums, piano)	Two Rooms: Celebrating the Songs of Elton John & Bernie Taupin
1991	"The Quiet's Too Loud" (producer, drums, backing vocals)	Inside Seduction (Lamont Dozier)
1992	"Sweet Little Mystery", "Ways to Cry" (vocals, with John Martyn) "Could've Been Me" (drums, vocals with John Martyn)	Couldn't Love You More (John Martyn)
1993	"Ways to Cry", "Could've Been Me", "Sweet Little Mystery" (vocals, with John Martyn)	No Little Boy (John Martyn)
1993	"Talk Of The Town" (bongos) "Long Tall Cool One", "China Doll" (backing vocals) "Fields of Gray" (backing vocals, tambourine)	Harbor Lights (Bruce Hornsby)
1993	"Hero" (producer, drums, percussion, keyboards, vocals)	Thousand Roads (David Crosby)
1994	"Another Day in Paradise" (vocals, live version with David Crosby)	Grammy's Greatest Moments Volume I
1994	"I've Been Trying" (vocals, all instruments)	A Tribute to Curtis Mayfield
1995	"Do Nothin' Till You Hear from Me" (vocals)	Q's Jook Joint (Quincy Jones)
1995	"Too Busy Thinking About My Baby" (vocals	Tonin' (The Manhattan Transfer)
1995	"Why Can't It Wait 'Til Morning?" (vocals)	Elixir (Fourplay)
1996	"Somewhere" (vocals)	The Songs of West Side Story (Various)
1996	And (entire album: drums, backing vocals)	And (John Martyn)
1998	"Golden Slumbers / Carry That Weight / The End" (drums, vocals, percussion)	In My Life (George Martin)
1998	"Birdland" (drums)	Plays Well With Others – CD 4 (Buddy Rich Big Band – A Tribute to Buddy Rich) [released 2018]
1999	"Another Day in Paradise" (vocals)	L.A. Jazz Syndicate
2002	"Layla" (drums)	Plays Well With Others – CD 4 (Eric Clapton – Live at Party at the Palace) [released 2018]
2002	"Why" (drums)	Plays Well With Others – CD 4 (Annie Lennox – Live at Party at the Palace) [released 2018]
2002	"Everything I Do (I Do It For You)" (drums)	Plays Well With Others – CD 4 (Bryan Adams – Live at Party at the Palace) [released 2018]
2002	"With a Little Help From My Friends" (drums)	Plays Well With Others – CD 4 (Joe Cocker – Live at Party at the Palace) [released 2018]
2003	"Teach Me Tonight" (vocals)	I Wish I Knew (Silvano Bazan Trio)
2005	"Son of Man (Reprise)", "Leaving Home (Find My Way)", "Who Am I?", "Who Am I? (Reprise)" (vocals, drums)	Tarzan II
2006	"Everything That I Am" (vocals, drums)	Tarzan: The Broadway Musical
2008	"The Big Bang" (drums)	U-Catastrophe (Simon Collins)
2009	"Heel of the Hunt", "Can't Turn Back the Years" (backing vocals)	Heaven and Earth (John Martyn) [released 2011]
2013	"Against All Odds (Take a Look at Me Now)" (vocals)	Under the Influence (Straight No Chaser)

== See also ==
- Phil Collins
- The Phil Collins Big Band
- Touring and studio musicians of Phil Collins
- Awards and nominations
- Genesis discography
- Brand X discography
