= List of awards and nominations received by Phil Collins =

Phil Collins awards and nominations
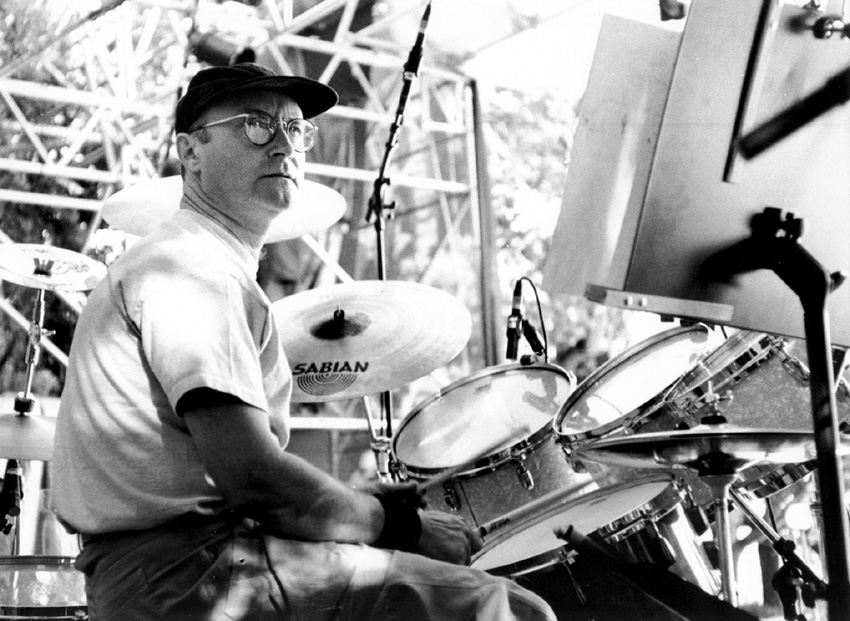
- Collins in 1996
Awards and nominations
Award	Wins	Nominations
Academy Awards	1	3
Golden Globe Awards	2	3
Grammy Awards	8	26

The following list includes some of the most significant awards and nominations received by musician Phil Collins as a solo artist.

Collins has received numerous accolades including eight Grammy Awards, an Academy Award, two Golden Globe Awards, three American Music Awards, four Billboard Music Awards, six Brit Awards, and an MTV Video Music Award. He was inducted into the Hollywood Walk of Fame in 1999, the Songwriters Hall of Fame in 2003, and the Rock and Roll Hall of Fame in 2026. He received the Disney Legend Award in 2002.

He received eight competitive Grammy Awards including the Grammy Award for Record of the Year for Another Day in Paradise (1991), and two consecutive Grammy Awards for Best Male Pop Vocal Performance for Against All Odds (Take a Look at Me Now) (1985) and No Jacket Required (1986). He also won the Grammy Award for Best Soundtrack Album for the Walt Disney Pictures animated film Tarzan (1999) as well as the Grammy Award for Best Song Written for Visual Media for "Two Hearts" from the romantic crime comedy Buster (1988).

For his work in film, he won the Academy Award for Best Original Song for "You'll Be in My Heart" from the animated film Tarzan (1999). He was Oscar-nominated for "Against All Odds" from the neo-noir romantic drama Against All Odds (1984), and "Two Hearts" from the romantic crime comedy Buster (1988). He also received two Golden Globe Awards for Best Original Song for both "Two Hearts" and "You'll Be in My Heart".

== Major associations ==
=== Academy Awards ===
Year	Category	Nominated work	Result	Ref.
1984	Best Original Song	"Against All Odds" (from Against All Odds)	Nominated	
1988	Best Original Song (shared with Lamont Dozier)	"Two Hearts" (from Buster)	Nominated	
1999	Best Original Song	"You'll Be in My Heart" (from Tarzan)	Won	

=== American Music Awards ===
Year	Category	Nominated work	Result	Ref.
1986	Favorite Pop/Rock Album	No Jacket Required	Nominated	
1986	Favorite Pop/Rock Male Artist	No Jacket Required	Nominated	
1986	Favorite Pop/Rock Male Video Artist	No Jacket Required	Nominated	
1986	Favorite Pop/Rock Video	"Easy Lover" (featuring Philip Bailey)	Nominated	
1986	Favorite Soul/R&B Male Video Artist	"Easy Lover" (featuring Philip Bailey)	Nominated	
1991	Favorite Pop/Rock Album	...But Seriously	Won	
1991	Favorite Pop/Rock Male Artist	...But Seriously	Won	
2000	Favorite Adult Contemporary Artist	Tarzan Soundtrack	Won	

=== Brit Awards ===
Year	Category	Nominated work	Result	Ref.
1983	British Male Artist	Himself	Nominated	
1986	British Album	No Jacket Required	Won	
1986	British Male Artist	Himself	Won	
1986	British Producer	Hugh Padgham	Nominated	
1987	British Male Artist	Himself	Nominated	
1989	British Male Artist	Himself	Won	
1989	Soundtrack/Cast Recording	Buster Soundtrack (featuring Anne Dudley & The Four Tops)	Won	
1990	British Single	"Another Day in Paradise"	Won	
1990	British Male Artist	Himself	Won	
1991	British Male Artist	Himself	Nominated	
1992	British Male Artist	Himself	Nominated	
1993	British Male Artist	Himself	Nominated	
2010	British Album of 30 Years	No Jacket Required	Nominated	

=== Billboard Music Awards ===
Year	Category	Nominated work	Result	Ref.
1990	#1 World Album	...But Seriously	Won	
1990	Top Male Artist	Himself	Won	
1990	#1 Adult Contemporary Artist	Himself	Won	
1990	#1 Adult Contemporary Single	"Do You Remember?"	Won	
1999	#1 Adult Contemporary Single	"You'll Be in My Heart"	Nominated	

=== Golden Globe Awards ===
Year	Category	Nominated work	Result	Ref.
1985	Best Original Song	"Against All Odds" (from Against All Odds)	Nominated	
1989	Best Original Song (shared with Lamont Dozier)	"Two Hearts" (from Buster)	Won*	
2000	Best Original Song	"You'll Be in My Heart" (from Tarzan)	Won	

*Tie with Carly Simon for "Let the River Run" (from Working Girl).

=== Grammy Awards ===
Year	Category	Nominated work	Result	Ref.
1984	Best Rock Vocal Performance, Male	"I Don't Care Anymore"	Nominated	
1985	Song of the Year	"Against All Odds (Take a Look at Me Now)"	Nominated	
1985	Best Pop Vocal Performance, Male	"Against All Odds (Take a Look at Me Now)"	Won	
1985	Best Album of Original Score Written for a Motion Picture or a Television Special	Against All Odds Soundtrack (featuring Big Country, Larry Carlton, Michel Colombier, Peter Gabriel, Kid Creole and the Coconuts, Stevie Nicks & Mike Rutherford)	Nominated	
1985	Best Video, Short Form	Phil Collins (home video) (consisting of the music videos "In The Air Tonight", "I Missed Again", "Thru These Walls" & "You Can't Hurry Love")	Nominated	
1986	Album of the Year (shared with Hugh Padgham)	No Jacket Required	Won	
1986	Best Pop Vocal Performance, Male	No Jacket Required	Won	
1986	Best Pop Performance by a Duo or Group With Vocals	"Easy Lover" (featuring Philip Bailey)	Nominated	
1986	Producer of the Year (Non-Classical)	Phil Collins and Hugh Padgham	Won	
1986	Best Music Video, Short Form	"Do They Know It's Christmas?" (as part of Band Aid)	Nominated	
1986	Best Music Video, Short Form	No Jacket Required EP (home video) (consisting of the music videos "Sussudio", "One More Night", "Who Said I Would", "Don't Lose My Number" & "Take Me Home")	Nominated	
1988	Best Performance Music Video (shared with Anthony Eaton)	The Prince's Trust All-Star Rock Concert (home video) (featuring Eric Clapton, Elton John, Mark Knopfler, Paul McCartney, George Michael, Rod Stewart, Sting, Tina Turner & Paul Young)	Won	
1989	Best Pop Vocal Performance, Male	"A Groovy Kind of Love"	Nominated	
1989	Best Song Written Specifically for a Motion Picture or Television (shared with Lamont Dozier)	"Two Hearts" (from Buster)	Won	
1991	Album of the Year (shared with Hugh Padgham)	...But Seriously	Nominated	
1991	Best Engineered Recording – Non-Classical (for Hugh Padgham)	...But Seriously	Nominated	
1991	Record of the Year (shared with Hugh Padgham)	"Another Day in Paradise"	Won	
1991	Song of the Year	"Another Day in Paradise"	Nominated	
1991	Best Pop Vocal Performance, Male	"Another Day in Paradise"	Nominated	
1991	Best Music Video, Short Form	"Another Day in Paradise"	Nominated	
1991	Best Pop Instrumental Performance	"Saturday Night and Sunday Morning"	Nominated	
1991	Producer of the Year (Non-Classical)	Phil Collins and Hugh Padgham	Nominated	
1991	Best Music Video, Long Form	The Singles Collection (home video)	Nominated	
1997	Best Instrumental Arrangement with Accompanying Vocals (for Quincy Jones & Sammy Nestico)	"Do Nothing till You Hear from Me" (featuring Quincy Jones, from his album Q's Jook Joint)	Nominated	
2000	Best Soundtrack Album	Tarzan Soundtrack (featuring Mark Mancina)	Won	
2000	Best Song Written for Visual Media	"You'll Be in My Heart" (from Tarzan)	Nominated	

== Miscellaneous awards ==
=== Ivor Novello Awards ===
Year Awarded	Nominee/work	Category	Result	Ref.
1982	"In the Air Tonight"	International Hit of the Year	Won	
1985	"Against All Odds"	Best Song Musically and Lyrically	Won	
1986	"Easy Lover" (featuring Philip Bailey)	Most Performed Work	Won	
1986	"Easy Lover" (featuring Philip Bailey)	Best Selling A-Side	Nominated	
1989	"Two Hearts"	Best Film Theme or Song	Nominated	
1990	"Another Day in Paradise"	Best Song Musically and Lyrically	Nominated	
1990	"Another Day in Paradise"	International Hit of the Year	Won	
1991	Himself	Songwriter of the Year	Won	
2008	Himself	International Achievement	Won	

=== MTV Video Music Awards ===
Year Awarded	Nominee/work	Category	Result	Ref.
1985	"Easy Lover" (featuring Philip Bailey)	Best Overall Performance in a Video	Won	
1986	"Take Me Home"	Best Male Video	Nominated	

=== NRJ Music Awards ===
Year	Nominee / work	Award	Result
2002	Himself	NRJ Award of Honor	Won

=== Nickelodeon Kids' Choice Awards ===
Year Awarded	Nominee/work	Category	Result	Ref.
2000	"Two Worlds" (from Tarzan)	Favorite Song from a Movie	Nominated	

== Honorary awards ==
=== Disney Legends ===
Year Awarded	Award	Notes	Ref.
2002	Disney Legend Award	For outstanding contribution to The Walt Disney Company**	

**Until Anika Noni Rose became a recipient in 2011, Collins held the record for shortest time between his first contribution in 1996, when he first started to write the music for Disney's Tarzan, and being named a Disney Legend in 2002.

=== Hall of Fame ===
Year Awarded	Category	Ref.
1999	Hollywood Walk of Fame	
2003	Songwriters Hall of Fame	
2026	Rock and Roll Hall of Fame	

=== Royal awards ===
Year Awarded	Award	Notes	Ref.
1994	Lieutenant of the Royal Victorian Order	For his contribution to The Prince's Trust	

== Honorary degrees ==
Year Awarded	Degree	University	Notes	Ref.
1987	Honorary Doctorate of Fine Arts	Fairleigh Dickinson University		
1991	Honorary Doctorate of Music	Berklee College of Music		
2012	Honorary Doctorate of History	McMurry University	For the book The Alamo and Beyond: A Collector's Journey (2012)	
2019	Honorary Doctorate of Jazz And Pop Music	University of Music and Performing Arts Graz		

== See also ==
- For Genesis, see Awards and nominations received by Genesis.
