= Touring and studio musicians of Phil Collins =

The following are the musicians who have performed with drummer and singer-songwriter Phil Collins during Collins's solo career. This does not necessarily include any of the musicians who performed with Collins alongside Genesis.

== "Not Dead Yet" Tour Musicians ==
This is a list of performers who toured with Collins in 2017/2018/2019 during the Not Dead Yet Tour.

- Phil Collins - lead vocals, percussion
- Nic Collins - drums, piano
- Daryl Stuermer - lead guitar
- Leland Sklar - bass guitar
- Brad Cole - keyboards, vocoder on "In the Air Tonight", musical director.
- Luis Conte - percussion (except Dublin, Lyon and Hyde Park dates)
- Richie Garcia - percussion (only Dublin, Lyon and Hyde Park dates)
- Ronnie Caryl - rhythm guitar
- Arnold McCuller - backing vocals (except Paris, Dublin and Hyde Park dates)
- Amy Keys - backing vocals
- Bridgette Bryant - backing vocals
- Lamont van Hook - backing vocals
- Harry Kim - trumpet
- Dan Fornero - trumpet
- George Shelby - saxophone
- Luis Bonilla - trombone

== 2016 Performances musicians ==
This is a list of performers who performed with Collins during the 2016 concerts:

- Phil Collins - lead vocals
- Brad Cole - keyboards, vocoder on "In the Air Tonight".
- Luis Conte - percussion
- Nathan East - bass guitar, backing vocals (only on the 29th of August, US Open performance)
- Leland Sklar - bass guitar
- Daryl Stuermer - lead guitar
- Nic Collins - drums

== "First Final Farewell" Tour musicians ==
This is a list of performers who toured with Collins in support of his 2002 album, Testify, during the First Final Farewell Tour.

- Phil Collins - drums, lead vocals, electric piano
- Gerald Albright - saxophone
- Bill Cantos - backing vocals
- Ronnie Caryl - rhythm guitar, backing vocals
- Brad Cole - keyboards, vocoder on "In the Air Tonight".
- Luis Conte - percussion
- Lynne Fiddmont-Lindsey - backing vocals
- Dan Fornero - trumpet
- Connie Jackson-Comegys - backing vocals
- Amy Keys - backing vocals
- Harry Kim - trumpet, horns director
- Arnold McCuller - backing vocals
- Leland Sklar - bass guitar
- Daryl Stuermer - lead guitar
- Chester Thompson - drums
- Lamont Van Hooke - backing vocals
- Arturo Velasco - trombone

== Live members ==
Image	Member	Years	Instruments	Tours	
	Phil Collins	1982–2005; 2010; 2016–2019	lead vocals; drums; percussion; piano; all instrumentation (studio 1993 and 2002)	All tours	all releases
	Daryl Stuermer	1982–2005; 2010; 2016–2019	lead and rhythm guitar; backing vocals; keyboards (studio 1985)	All tours	All releases except Both Sides (1993) and Going Back (2010)
	Mo Foster	1982 (died 2023)	bass guitar	Hello, I Must Be Going! tour	Hello, I Must Be Going! (1982)
	Chester Thompson	1982–1990; 2004–2005; 2010	drums	Hello, I Must Be Going! tour – But Seriously tour	none – only tours
	Peter Robinson	1982–1986	keyboards; vocoder	Hello, I Must Be Going! tour; No Jacket Required tour	Hello, I Must Be Going! (1982); No Jacket Required (1985)
	Michael Harris	1982–1986	trumpet	Hello, I Must Be Going! tour; No Jacket Required tour	All releases from Face Value (1981) to ...But Seriously (1989) (all as "The Phenix Horns")
	Rahmlee Michael Davis	1982–1990	trumpet	Hello, I Must Be Going! – But Seriously tours	All releases from Face Value (1981) to ...But Seriously (1989) (all as "The Phenix Horns")
	Louis "Lui Lui" Satterfield	1982–1990	trombone	Hello, I Must Be Going! – But Seriously tours	All releases from Face Value (1981) to ...But Seriously (1989) (all as "The Phenix Horns")
	Don Myrick	1982–1990 (died 1993)	saxophone	Hello, I Must Be Going! – But Seriously tours	All releases from Face Value (1981) to ...But Seriously (1989) (all as "The Phenix Horns")
	Leland Sklar	1984–1990; 2004–2005; 2016–2019	bass guitar; backing vocals	The No Jacket Required tour - But Seriously tour and First Final Farewell tour – Not Dead Yet tour	No Jacket Required (1985); ...But Seriously (1989)
	Brad Cole	1990–2005; 2016–2019	keyboards; vocoder	But Seriously tour – Not Dead Yet tour	Dance into the Light (1996)
	Harry Kim	1990–2005; 2016–2019	trumpet	But Seriously tour – Not Dead Yet tour	...But Seriously (1989); Dance into the Light (1996)
	Fred White	1990	backing vocals	But Seriously tour	none
	Bridgette Bryant	1990; 2017–2019	backing vocals	But Seriously tour; Not Dead Yet tour	none
	Arnold McCuller	1990–2005; 2017; 2017–2019	backing vocals	But Seriously tour - Not Dead Yet tour	none
	Nathan East	1994–1997; 2016	bass guitar; backing vocals	But Seriously tour; One show in 2016	...But Seriously (1989); Dance into the Light (1996)
	Ricky Lawson	1994–1997 (died 2013)	drums	But Seriously tour - Both Sides tour	none
	Andrew Woolfolk	1994–1997 (died 2022)	saxophone	But Seriously tour - Both Sides tour	Dance into the Light (1996)
	Dan Fornero	1994–2005; 2017–2019	trumpet	But Seriously tour - Not Dead Yet tour	Dance into the Light (1996)
	Arturo Velasco	1994–2005	trombone	But Seriously tour - First Final Farewell tour	Dance into the Light (1996)
	Amy Keys	1994–2005; 2010; 2017–2019	backing vocals	But Seriously tour – First Final Farewell tour; Not Dead Yet tour	None
	Ronnie Caryl	1994–2005; 2016–2019	rhythm guitar; backing vocals	The Trip into the Light tour – Not Dead Yet tour	Going Back (2010)
	John Mahon	2000	percussion	Musicares Awards 2000	None
	Luis Conte	2004–2005; 2016–2017; 2018–2019	percussion	First Final Farewell tour; Not Dead Yet tour	None
	Gerald Albright	2004–2005	saxophone	First Final Farewell tour	None
	Bill Cantos	2004–2005; 2010	backing vocals	First Final Farewell tour; Going Back tour	None
	Lynne Fiddmont-Lindsey	2004–2005; 2010	backing vocals	First Final Farewell tour; Going Back tour	None
	Connie Jackson-Comegys	2004–2005; 2010	backing vocals	First Final Farewell tour; Going Back tour	Going Back (2010)
	Lamont Van Hooke	2004–2005; 2017–2019; 2010	backing vocals	First Final Farewell tour – Not Dead Yet tour	Going Back (2010)
	Bob Babbitt	2010 (died 2012)	bass guitar	Going Back tour	Going Back (2010)
	Eddie Willis	2010 (died 2018)	guitar	Going Back tour	Going Back (2010)
	Ray Monette	2010	guitar	Going Back tour	Going Back (2010)
	Graeme Blevins	2010	saxophone	Going Back tour	Going Back (2010)
	Phil Todd	2010	saxophone; flute	Going Back tour	Going Back (2010)
	John Aram	2010	trombone	Going Back tour	Going Back (2010)
	Guy Barker	2010	trumpet	Going Back tour	Going Back (2010)
	Tom Rees-Roberts	2010	trumpet	Going Back tour	Going Back (2010)
	Terron Brooks	2010	backing vocals	Going Back tour	none
	Leslie Smith	2010	percussion; backing vocals	Going Back tour	none
	Nic Collins	2016– 2019	drums; piano	2016 shows – Not Dead Yet tour	none
	Luis Bonilla	2017– 2019	trombone	Not Dead Yet tour	none
	George Shelby	2017– 2019	saxophone	Not Dead Yet tour	none
	Richie Garcia	2017	percussion	Not Dead Yet tour	none

== Former and guest studio musicians ==
- Stephen Bishop - backing vocals
- Gary Barnacle - saxophone
- Alex Brown - backing vocals
- Paul Bushnell - bass guitar
- Eric Clapton - guitar
- David Crosby - backing vocals
- Lynne Fiddmont- backing vocals
- Martyn Ford - strings conductor
- David Frank - Minimoog bass, keyboards
- Peter Gabriel - backing vocals
- John Giblin - bass guitar
- Nick Glennie-Smith - keyboards
- Alphonso Johnson - bass guitar
- Marva King - backing vocals
- Arif Mardin - strings conductor
- Dominic Miller - guitar
- Jamie Muhoberac - keyboards
- Pino Palladino - bass guitar
- Joe Partridge - slide guitar
- Tim Pierce - guitar
- Eric Rigler - Uilleann pipes
- James Sangar - additional programming
- Ronnie Scott - tenor saxophone
- L. Shankar - violins, vocal effects
- Sting - backing vocals
- Helen Terry - backing vocals
- Steve Winwood - Hammond organ

All past touring members worked with Phil in the studio except for Bryant, Lawson, Mahon, White and Odom Jr.

== See also ==
- Phil Collins discography
- List of awards and nominations received by Phil Collins
