= The No Jacket Required World Tour =

1985 concert tour by Phil Collins

- Tour by Phil Collins
- Location: Asia; Europe; North America; Oceania
- Associated album: No Jacket Required
- Start date: 11 February 1985
- End date: 13 July 1985
- Legs: 3
- No. of shows: 85

Phil Collins concert chronology
- The Hello, I Must Be Going Tour (1982–83); The No Jacket Required World Tour (1985); The Seriously, Live! World Tour (1990)

The No Jacket Required World Tour was a concert tour by the English drummer, singer and songwriter Phil Collins, which occurred February–July 1985 in support of his 1985 album, No Jacket Required. The album had been a massive international success and the tour concluded with Collins performing "Against All Odds" and "In the Air Tonight" at both Live Aid concerts, in London and Philadelphia, on 13 July 1985.

During the tour, the music video for "Take Me Home" was filmed on location in various cities where the tour was staged. It was directed by Jim Yukich and produced by Paul Flattery. Flattery/Yukich also directed the video for "Don't Lose My Number" which was shot in various locations in Australia and was a parody of music video directors pitching famous or cliché ideas. It won a Billboard Video Award in 1987.

A television special, also directed by Jim Yukich and produced by Paul Flattery, was recorded at Reunion Arena in Dallas on 29 May 1985, and aired on HBO entitled No Jacket Required... Sold Out. The broadcast was released on VHS and LaserDisc in 1985 with extended footage and the title changed to Phil Collins: No Ticket Required. It won an ACE AWARD for best TV Music special in 1986. Another television special was recorded at the Royal Albert Hall in London, England, for a Cinemax show called Album Flash which was also produced by Flattery and directed by Yukich.

== Setlist ==
- "I Don't Care Anymore"
- "Only You Know And I Know"
- "I Cannot Believe It's True"
- "This Must Be Love"
- "Against All Odds"
- "Inside Out"
- "Who Said I Would"
- "If Leaving Me Is Easy"
- "Sussudio"
- "Behind The Lines"
- "Don't Lose My Number"
- "The West Side"
- "One More Night"
- "In the Air Tonight"
- "Like China"
- "You Can't Hurry Love"
- "It Don't Matter To Me"
- "Hand in Hand"
- "Take Me Home"
- "People Get Ready"
- "It's All Right"

== Tour dates ==
List of 1985 concerts
| Date | City | Country | Venue | Attendance | Revenue |
|---|---|---|---|---|---|
| 11 February 1985 | Nottingham | England | Theatre Royal | | |
| 12 February 1985 | Manchester | England | Manchester Apollo | | |
| 13 February 1985 | Glasgow | Scotland | The Apollo | | |
| 15 February 1985 | Newcastle | England | Newcastle City Hall | | |
| 16 February 1985 | Sheffield | England | Sheffield City Hall | | |
| 17 February 1985 | London | England | Royal Albert Hall | | |
| 18 February 1985 | London | England | Royal Albert Hall | | |
| 19 February 1985 | London | England | Royal Albert Hall | | |
| 20 February 1985 | London | England | Royal Albert Hall | | |
| 21 February 1985 | London | England | Royal Albert Hall | | |
| 22 February 1985 | London | England | Royal Albert Hall | | |
| 23 February 1985 | Birmingham | England | National Exhibition Centre | | |
| 25 February 1985 | Düsseldorf | West Germany | Philipshalle | | |
| 26 February 1985 | Brussels | Belgium | Forest National | | |
| 27 February 1985 | Rotterdam | Netherlands | Rotterdam Ahoy | | |
| 1 March 1985 | Gothenburg | Sweden | Scandinavium | | |
| 2 March 1985 | Stockholm | Sweden | Johanneshovs Isstadion | | |
| 3 March 1985 | Copenhagen | Denmark | Valby-Hallen | | |
| 4 March 1985 | Bremen | West Germany | Stadthalle | | |
| 5 March 1985 | Paris | France | Palais Omnisports de Paris-Bercy | | |
| 6 March 1985 | Paris | France | Palais Omnisports de Paris-Bercy | | |
| 7 March 1985 | Frankfurt | West Germany | Festhalle Frankfurt | | |
| 8 March 1985 | Munich | West Germany | Rudi-Sedlmayer-Halle | | |
| 10 March 1985 | Zürich | Switzerland | Hallenstadion | | |
| 11 March 1985 | Stuttgart | West Germany | Böblingen Sporthalle | | |
| 13 March 1985 | Nantes | France | Parc des expositions de la Beaujoire | | |
| 14 March 1985 | Bordeaux | France | Patinoire de Mériadeck | | |
| 15 March 1985 | Toulouse | France | Palais des Sports de Toulouse | | |
| 16 March 1985 | Lyon | France | Halle Tony Garnier | | |
| 17 March 1985 | Lausanne | Switzerland | Halle des Fêtes Beaujoire | | |
| 30 March 1985 | Brisbane | Australia | Brisbane Festival Hall | | |
| 31 March 1985 | Brisbane | Australia | Brisbane Festival Hall | | |
| 3 April 1985 | Sydney | Australia | Sydney Entertainment Centre | | |
| 4 April 1985 | Sydney | Australia | Sydney Entertainment Centre | | |
| 5 April 1985 | Sydney | Australia | Sydney Entertainment Centre | | |
| 6 April 1985 | Sydney | Australia | Sydney Entertainment Centre | | |
| 7 April 1985 | Sydney | Australia | Sydney Entertainment Centre | | |
| 10 April 1985 | Melbourne | Australia | Melbourne Sports and Entertainment Centre | | |
| 11 April 1985 | Melbourne | Australia | Melbourne Sports and Entertainment Centre | | |
| 12 April 1985 | Melbourne | Australia | Melbourne Sports and Entertainment Centre | | |
| 13 April 1985 | Melbourne | Australia | Melbourne Sports and Entertainment Centre | | |
| 14 April 1985 | Melbourne | Australia | Melbourne Sports and Entertainment Centre | | |
| 17 April 1985 | Adelaide | Australia | Memorial Drive Park | | |
| 20 April 1985 | Perth | Australia | Perth Entertainment Centre | | |
| 23 April 1985 | Tokyo | Japan | Nippon Budokan | | |
| 24 April 1985 | Tokyo | Japan | Nippon Budokan | | |
| ~~25 April 1985~~ | ~~Fukuoka~~ | Japan | ~~Fukuoka Sunpalace~~ | | |
| 26 April 1985 | Osaka | Japan | Festival Hall | | |
| 27 April 1985 | Nagoya | Japan | Nagoya-shi Kōkaidō | | |
| 12 May 1985 | Worcester | United States | Worcester Centrum | 11,401 / 11,401 | $162,340 |
| 13 May 1985 | Montreal | Canada | Montreal Forum | | |
| 15 May 1985 | New York City | United States | Radio City Music Hall | 17,662 / 17,662 | $375,600 |
| 16 May 1985 | New York City | United States | Radio City Music Hall | 17,662 / 17,662 | $375,600 |
| 17 May 1985 | New York City | United States | Radio City Music Hall | 17,662 / 17,662 | $375,600 |
| 20 May 1985 | Philadelphia | United States | The Spectrum | 14,975 / 17,000 | $249,140 |
| 21 May 1985 | Hampton | United States | Hampton Coliseum | 10,544 / 10,544 | $182,411 |
| 22 May 1985 | Greensboro | United States | Greensboro Coliseum | 12,074 / 12,074 | $187,147 |
| 23 May 1985 | Atlanta | United States | Omni Coliseum | 16,367 / 16,367 | $292,969 |
| 24 May 1985 | Birmingham | United States | Birmingham–Jefferson Convention Complex | | |
| 25 May 1985 | Memphis | United States | Mid-South Coliseum | 9,750 / 9,750 | $144,188 |
| 26 May 1985 | New Orleans | United States | Lakefront Arena | 9,678 / 9,678 | $173,236 |
| 27 May 1985 | Houston | United States | The Summit | 28,650 / 28,650 | $512,835 |
| 28 May 1985 | Houston | United States | The Summit | 28,650 / 28,650 | $512,835 |
| 29 May 1985 | Dallas | United States | Reunion Arena | 15,462 / 15,462 | $225,600 |
| 30 May 1985 | Austin | United States | Frank Erwin Center | | |
| 1 June 1985 | Phoenix | United States | Compton Terrace Amphitheatre | 23,862 / 23,862 | $327,213 |
| 2 June 1985 | Irvine | United States | Irvine Meadows Amphitheatre | 29,930 / 29,930 | $429,150 |
| 3 June 1985 | Irvine | United States | Irvine Meadows Amphitheatre | 29,930 / 29,930 | $429,150 |
| 4 June 1985 | Los Angeles | United States | Universal Amphitheatre | 18,753 / 18,753 | $300,048 |
| 5 June 1985 | Los Angeles | United States | Universal Amphitheatre | 18,753 / 18,753 | $300,048 |
| 6 June 1985 | Los Angeles | United States | Universal Amphitheatre | 18,753 / 18,753 | $300,048 |
| 7 June 1985 | Oakland | United States | Oakland-Alameda County Coliseum Arena | 35,948 / 35,948 | $575,168 |
| 8 June 1985 | Oakland | United States | Oakland-Alameda County Coliseum Arena | 35,948 / 35,948 | $575,168 |
| 9 June 1985 | Oakland | United States | Oakland-Alameda County Coliseum Arena | 35,948 / 35,948 | $575,168 |
| 11 June 1985 | Sacramento | United States | California Exposition & State Fair | 12,200 / 12,200 | $195,200 |
| 13 June 1985 | Denver | United States | McNichols Sports Arena | 15,029 / 15,029 | $223,772 |
| 15 June 1985 | Kansas City | United States | Kemper Arena | 13,707 / 13,707 | $187,054 |
| 16 June 1985 | St. Louis | United States | Kiel Auditorium | 10,385 / 10,385 | $147,377 |
| 17 June 1985 | Hoffman Estates | United States | Poplar Creek Music Theater | 50,404 / 50,404 | $821,585 |
| 18 June 1985 | Hoffman Estates | United States | Poplar Creek Music Theater | 50,404 / 50,404 | $821,585 |
| 19 June 1985 | Lexington | United States | Rupp Arena | | |
| 21 June 1985 | Columbia | United States | Merriweather Post Pavilion | 19,319 / 19,319 | $345,810 |
| 22 June 1985 | Hartford | United States | Hartford Civic Center | 14,264 / 14,264 | $432,503 |
| 23 June 1985 | Saratoga Springs | United States | Saratoga Performing Arts Center | 19,000 / 19,000 | $327,750 |
| 25 June 1985 | Richfield | United States | Richfield Coliseum | | |
| 26 June 1985 | Richfield | United States | Richfield Coliseum | | |
| 27 June 1985 | Clarkston | United States | Pine Knob Music Theatre | 15,274 / 15,274 | $244,384 |
| 29 June 1985 | Toronto | Canada | Exhibition Stadium | 49,500 / 49,500 | $886,680 |
| 1 July 1985 | New York City | United States | Madison Square Garden | | |
| 2 July 1985 | New York City | United States | Madison Square Garden | | |
| 13 July 1985 | London | England | Wembley Stadium | | |
| 13 July 1985 | Philadelphia | United States | John F. Kennedy Stadium | | |

The Live Aid concerts were notable for Collins performing at both the Philadelphia and London shows. Bob Geldof, the organiser of Live Aid, originally asked Collins to be part of Geldof's first charity effort, Band Aid. Collins provided drums and sang backing vocals for Band Aid's 1984 No. 1 UK hit, "Do They Know It's Christmas?".

For Live Aid Collins first performed with Sting at Wembley Stadium. Together they performed "Roxanne", "Driven to Tears", "Against All Odds", "Message in a Bottle", "In the Air Tonight", "Long Long Way To Go", and "Every Breath You Take". After Collins finished performing, he boarded a Concorde flight to the U.S. to enable him to perform at the Philadelphia show. On the plane, he met Cher, and convinced her to be part of the event. Robert Plant had asked Collins if he would perform with Jimmy Page, John Paul Jones, Paul Martinez and Tony Thompson and he in a Led Zeppelin reunion of sorts. At the concert he began by playing drums on "Layla", "White Room" and "She's Waiting" for friend Eric Clapton. Collins performed "Against All Odds" and "In the Air Tonight" and finished the night playing drums for Led Zeppelin's aforementioned act.

== Personnel ==
For the tour, Collins retained his usual cast of musicians, including Chester Thompson, Leland Sklar and Daryl Stuermer. The band was nicknamed the "Hot Tub Club".

- Phil Collins – vocals, piano, drums, percussion
- Daryl Stuermer – guitar, backing vocals
- Leland Sklar – bass, backing vocals
- Peter Robinson – piano, keyboards, vocoder
- Chester Thompson – drums, percussion
- The Phenix Horns
  - Rahmlee Michael Davis – trumpet, percussion, backing vocals
  - Michael Harris – trumpet, percussion, backing vocals
  - Don Myrick – saxophone, percussion, backing vocals
  - Louis Satterfield – trombone, percussion, backing vocals
