= Take Me Home (Phil Collins song) =

1985 single by Phil Collins

Single by Phil Collins

from the album No Jacket Required
- B-side: "Only You Know and I Know" (UK); "We Said Hello Goodbye" (US)
- Released: 15 July 1985 (UK); March 1986 (US)
- Recorded: 1984
- Studio: The Townhouse (London); Old Croft (Shalford, Surrey)
- Genre: Electronic rock; new wave; synth-pop
- Length: 4:37 (single version); 5:51 (album version); 8:03 (extended mix); 6:46 (extended mix – Japan only)
- Label: Virgin; Atlantic
- Songwriter: Phil Collins
- Producers: Phil Collins; Hugh Padgham

Phil Collins singles chronology
"Don't Lose My Number" (1985)	"Take Me Home" (1985)	"Separate Lives" (1985)

Music video
- "Take Me Home" on YouTube

"Take Me Home" is a song written and performed by the English drummer, singer and songwriter Phil Collins. It is the tenth and final track on Collins' third solo studio album, No Jacket Required. Collins co-produced the song with Hugh Padgham and released it as a single in the UK in July 1985 and the US in March 1986. It did moderately well in the UK, peaking at No. 19. While it was not as successful as other singles from the album, such as "Sussudio" or "One More Night" in the US, it still reached the top 10, peaking at No. 7.

The "extended mix" of "Take Me Home", released on the 12-inch single, was one of the six songs to be included on Collins' remix album 12″ers (1987). John "Tokes" Potoker created an edited extended mix of the song for the Japanese release of 12″ers, removing around one and half minutes from the full length mix.

In a readers poll, Rolling Stone ranked "Take Me Home" number five on their list of ten best Collins songs.

== Background ==
Former Police frontman Sting, Collins' former Genesis bandmate Peter Gabriel, and Helen Terry provide backing vocals on "Take Me Home".

The song lyrics refer to a patient in a mental institution and it is influenced by the 1962 Ken Kesey novel One Flew Over the Cuckoo's Nest.

=== Live version ===
"Take Me Home" became Collins's show closer during the No Jacket Required World Tour. It remained at the end of the live show for at least a decade, including the Seriously, Live! World Tour of 1990. The song was not featured in the 2001 video Live & Loose in Paris, although it was played as an encore.

== Music video ==
The music video, directed by Jim Yukich and produced by Paul Flattery, features Collins getting into a Ford Popular and singing a line of the song in various places around the world, including London, Paris, Tokyo, New York City, Sydney, Bremen, Memphis (Graceland), Los Angeles (Hollywood), Stockholm, San Francisco, Kyoto, Chicago, St. Louis and Houston. Filming was completed on location when Collins' subsequent No Jacket Required World Tour was staged at the corresponding locale.

== Critical reception ==
Critical reception for the song was mostly positive. Jan DeKnock of the Chicago Tribune said that the song was "hypnotic". Geoff Orens of AllMusic said that the song was an AMG Track Pick, and that the "pulsating 'Take Me Home' utilizes the drama of 'In the Air Tonight' on a more wistful track". David Fricke of Rolling Stone said that the song had "engaging, circular rhythm and languid melodic texture".

Marty Racine of the Houston Chronicle thought that "Take Me Home" was one of the few songs that "[rose] above the crowd [on the album]". Cashbox called it "an urgent ballad" with "intensity and hummable refrain". Billboard called it an "introspective mood piece of melancholy and defiance."

== Covers, remakes, and usage in media ==
"Take Me Home" appeared on the opening episode ("The Prodigal Son") of the second season of the American crime drama television series Miami Vice, much like Collins's own "In the Air Tonight" appeared in the series premiere a year earlier. The song was included on the Miami Vice II soundtrack album. The song was also the closing theme song for the World Wrestling Federation's television special, Saturday Night's Main Event, for several years in the late 1980s.

"Take Me Home" appeared on the Phil Collins tribute album Urban Renewal (2001), as performed by Malik Pendleton.

In 2003, the American hip-hop group Bone Thugs-n-Harmony based their song "Home" on this single. That version of the song featured the original song's chorus, and reached No. 19 in the UK. Collins appeared in the music video to sing the chorus.

In 2014, the American contemporary R&B singer JoJo included her own revamped interpretation of "Take Me Home" on her three-track Valentine's Day extended play (EP), #LoveJo. The cover, which features production from Da Internz, was praised for JoJo's vocals and the incorporation of trap and 808 beats. "The clear standout is her version of Phil Collins' 'Take Me Home,' all militant stomp buried under ambient noise," said Sam Lansky of Time magazine. "Her voice soars and crashes over the glitchy, stuttering beat."

In 2016, the extended mix was prominently used in a scene from the season 2 premiere episode of USA's television series Mr. Robot, in which an executive of the show's villainous corporation is blackmailed into publicly burning $5.9 million of his own company's money. In the same year, Phantogram covered the song for the album The Time Is Now! In 2026, the Phantogram cover was prominently used in the closing scene of the final episode of miniseries Lucky, starring Anya Taylor-Joy.

Little Big Town and Sugarland covered this song to honor LBT's 25th anniversary as a band, and they performed it on the 2024 CMT Music Awards.

== Track listings ==
All songs were written by Phil Collins, except where noted.

=== 7-inch vinyl single ===
- UK: Virgin / VS777

Side one
No.	Title	Length
1.	"Take Me Home" (edit)	4:37

Side two
No.	Title	Length
1.	"We Said Hello Goodbye"	4:15

- US: Atlantic / 7-89472
- Germany: WEA / 258 830-7
- Japan: WEA / P2058

Side one
No.	Title	Length
1.	"Take Me Home" (edit)	4:37

Side two
No.	Title	Lyrics	Music	Length
1.	"Only You Know and I Know"	Collins	Collins; Daryl Stuermer	4:21

=== 12-inch vinyl single ===
- UK: Virgin / VS777-12
- UK: Virgin / VSM777-12 (limited edition, in gatefold picture sleeve with integral fold-out map and stills from the "Take Me Home" video)

Side one
No.	Title	Length
1.	"Take Me Home" (extended mix)	8:07

Side two
No.	Title	Length
1.	"Take Me Home" (album version)	5:52
2.	"We Said Hello Goodbye"	4:15

=== CD single ===
- Japan: WEA International / WPCR-2066

No.	Title	Length
1.	"Take Me Home" (edit)	4:37
2.	"We Said Hello Goodbye"	4:15

== Personnel ==
- Phil Collins – vocals, backing vocals, keyboards, drums, Roland TR-909
- Daryl Stuermer – guitars
- Leland Sklar – bass, piccolo bass
- Peter Gabriel – backing vocals
- Sting – backing vocals
- Helen Terry – backing vocals

== Chart performance ==
Chart (1985–1986)	Peak position
Australia (Kent Music Report)	64
Canadian AC	2
Canadian Singles Chart	23
Europe (European Hot 100 Singles)	53
Irish Singles Chart	13
UK Singles (OCC)	19
UK Airplay (Music & Media)	5
US Billboard Hot 100	7
US Billboard Hot Mainstream Rock Tracks	12
US Billboard Hot Adult Contemporary Tracks	2

Year-end chart (1986)	Rank
US Top Pop Singles (Billboard)	88
