= Amy Keys =

American singer-songwriter

Amy Keys (born September 15, 1967) is an American singer and songwriter. Keys was signed to the Epic Records label and a solo album and several singles were released in 1989. She worked on Walt Disney movie soundtracks and as backing vocalist on studio recordings and live performances, most notably with Ringo Starr, Phil Collins, Toto and Johnny Hallyday.

== Discography ==
=== Solo albums ===
- 1989 – Lover's Intuition

== See also ==
- Touring and studio musicians of Phil Collins
- Johnny Hallyday : Flashback Tour: Palais des sports 2006; La Cigale : 12–17 décembre 2006 (2006); Tour 66 : stade de France 2009 (2009); On Stage / 2012 Tour (2013); Rester vivant tour (2016); (Warner Music)
- Toto (band)
