= 12″ers =

Remix album by Phil Collins
- Released: October 1987
- Recorded: May 1984 – January 1985
- Studios: The Townhouse, London and Old Croft, Surrey
- Genres: Pop; electronic; rock; soft rock
- Length: 40:29
- Label: Virgin
- Producers: Phil Collins; Hugh Padgham

Phil Collins chronology
| No Jacket Required (1985) | 12″ers (1987) | ...But Seriously (1989) |

Professional ratings
Review scores
| Source | Rating |
|---|---|
| AllMusic | 3/5 stars |

12″ers (pronounced 12 Inchers) is a remix album by English singer-songwriter Phil Collins, the lead vocalist and drummer for the rock band Genesis. The album contains remixed versions of six tracks from his 1985 album No Jacket Required. All special extended remixes are by John 'Tokes' Potoker, except for "One More Night" remixed by Hugh Padgham. The remixes on this album were originally released on various 12-inch singles which were taken from the album No Jacket Required, hence the name.

In Japan and Brazil, the release was originally a four-track EP, released on 12" and cassette. The main difference is the omission of remixes for "Who Said I Would" and "Only You Know and I Know" and the inclusion of an edited remix for "Take Me Home" which clocked in at 6:10. When the album was released on CD in 1988, it was the full six-track album, including the full length remix of "Take Me Home".

== Original releases ==
"Don't Lose My Number", "Take Me Home", "Sussudio" and "One More Night" were all released as 12" single A-sides. "Only You Know and I Know" was released as the B-side of the "Separate Lives" 12" single. "Who Said I Would" is exclusive to the CD edition of this compilation.

== Critical reception ==
Reviewing retrospectively for AllMusic, critic Shawn M. Haney wrote of the album "The album is a great way to reflect back on one's wondrous memories of '80s life. This will find the listener in the middle of an enjoyable musical experience, especially for those who were and continue to be a part of Collins' fan base."

== Track listing ==
All tracks are written by Phil Collins, except where noted.

CD edition
| No. | Title | Writer(s) | Length |
|---|---|---|---|
| 1. | "Take Me Home" | | 8:07 |
| 2. | "Sussudio" | | 6:35 |
| 3. | "Who Said I Would" | | 5:51 |
| 4. | "Only You Know and I Know" | Collins; Daryl Stuermer | 6:56 |
| 5. | "Don't Lose My Number" | | 6:36 |
| 6. | "One More Night" | | 6:21 |
| Total length: | | | 40:29 |

Japanese and Brazilian vinyl editions
| No. | Title | Length |
|---|---|---|
| 1. | "Sussudio" | 6:35 |
| 2. | "Take Me Home" | 6:10 |
| 3. | "Don't Lose My Number" | 6:36 |
| 4. | "One More Night" | 6:21 |

== Personnel ==
- Phil Collins – lead and backing vocals, drums, keyboards
- Daryl Stuermer – guitars
- John 'Tokes' Potoker – drum overdubs, backing vocals

== Charts ==
Weekly chart performance for 12″ers
| Chart (2025) | Peak position |
|---|---|
| Hungarian Physical Albums (MAHASZ) | 37 |

== Certifications and sales ==
| Region | Certification | Certified units/sales |
|---|---|---|
| Australia (ARIA) | Gold | 35,000^{^} |
| Brazil | — | 12,000 |
^{^} Shipments figures based on certification alone.
