= List of awards and nominations received by Genesis =

The following list includes some of the most significant awards and nominations received by the English rock band Genesis. This does not include any awards or nominations received for solo works or other group activities.

== Awards and nominations ==
Key
†	Indicates non-competitive categories

Award	Year (Note: Indicates the year of ceremony. Each year is linked to the article about the awards held that year, wherever possible.)	Category	Recipient(s)/nominee(s)	Result	Ref(s).
American Music Awards	1987	Favorite Pop/Rock Band/Duo/Group	Invisible Touch	Nominated	
American Music Awards	1993	Favorite Pop/Rock Band/Duo/Group	We Can't Dance	Won	
American Music Awards	1993	Favorite Adult Contemporary Album	We Can't Dance	Nominated	
American Music Awards	1993	Favorite Adult Contemporary Artist	We Can't Dance	Nominated	
Billboard Music Awards	1992	Concert Event of the Year	Genesis	Won	
Brit Awards	1993	British Album of the Year	We Can't Dance	Nominated	
Brit Awards	1993	British Video of the Year	"Jesus He Knows Me"	Nominated	
Grammy Awards	1985	Best Rock Performance by a Duo or Group with Vocal	Genesis	Nominated	
Grammy Awards	1985	Best Rock Instrumental Performance	"Second Home by the Sea"	Nominated	
Grammy Awards	1987	Best Pop Instrumental Performance (Orchestra, Group or Soloist)	"The Brazilian"	Nominated	
Grammy Awards	1988	Best Concept Music Video	"Land of Confusion"	Won	
Grammy Awards	1993	Best Pop Performance by a Duo or Group with Vocals	"I Can't Dance"	Nominated	
Grammy Awards	2010	Best Surround Sound Album	Tony Cousins and Nick Davis for Genesis 1970–1975	Nominated	
Ivor Novello Awards	1983	Outstanding Contribution to British Music	Genesis	Won	
Ivor Novello Awards	1988	Best Song Musically and Lyrically	"Throwing It All Away"	Nominated	
MTV Video Music Awards	1987	Video of the Year	"Land of Confusion"	Nominated	
MTV Video Music Awards	1987	Best Concept Video	"Land of Confusion"	Nominated	
MTV Video Music Awards	1987	Most Experimental Video	"Land of Confusion"	Nominated	
MTV Video Music Awards	1987	Best Direction in a Video	John Lloyd and Jim Yukich for "Land of Confusion"	Nominated	
MTV Video Music Awards	1987	Best Special Effects in a Video	John Lloyd and Jim Yukich for "Land of Confusion"	Nominated	
MTV Video Music Awards	1987	Best Art Direction in a Video	Stephen Bendelach, John Lloyd and Jim Yukich for "Land of Confusion"	Nominated	
MTV Video Music Awards	1987	Viewer's Choice	"Land of Confusion"	Nominated	
MTV Video Music Awards	1992	Best Cinematography in a Video	Daniel Pearl for "I Can't Dance"	Nominated	
MTV Video Music Awards	1992	International Viewer's Choice Award for MTV Europe	"I Can't Dance"	Nominated	
Progressive Music Awards	2012	Lifetime Achievement †	Genesis	Won	

== See also ==
- For Phil Collins’s solo career, see Awards and nominations received by Phil Collins.
- For Peter Gabriel’s solo career, see Awards and nominations received by Peter Gabriel.
- For Mike and the Mechanics, see Awards and nominations received by Mike and the Mechanics.
