= Grammy Award for Best Concept Music Video =

American music award

- Awarded for: Quality concept music videos
- Country: United States
- Presented by: National Academy of Recording Arts and Sciences
- First award: 1988
- Final award: 1989
- Website: grammy.com

The Grammy Award for Best Concept Music Video was an award that was presented to recording artists at the 30th Grammy Awards in 1988, and the 31st Grammy Awards in 1989, for quality, concept music videos. The Grammy Awards (Grammys) is an annual ceremony that was established in 1958 and was originally called the Gramophone Awards; awards are presented by the National Academy of Recording Arts and Sciences of the United States to "honor artistic achievement, technical proficiency and overall excellence in the recording industry, without regard to album sales or chart position".

Beginning in 1982, the academy began to honor quality music videos with the Video of the Year category, which was discontinued with the establishment of the MTV Video Music Awards in 1984 and was replaced with two awards; Best Video, Short Form and Best Video Album. Criteria changes for the 1988 and 1989 ceremonies resulted in the Best Concept Music Video award being presented alongside the award for Best Performance Music Video. Best Concept Music Video award recipients were the English rock band Genesis for "Land of Confusion" and the American singer "Weird Al" Yankovic for "Fat". The academy returned to the previous format in 1990, though the categories are now known as Best Short Form Music Video and Best Long Form Music Video.

== Background ==
The National Academy of Recording Arts and Sciences began to honor quality music videos with the Grammy Award for Video of the Year category in 1982. The first two award recipients were former member of The Monkees Michael Nesmith for the hour-long video Elephant Parts (also known as Michael Nesmith in Elephant Parts) and Olivia Newton-John for Olivia Physical. The Video of the Year category was discontinued in 1984 when MTV established the MTV Video Music Awards whose top award is also presented for Video of the Year. For the 26th Grammy Awards the academy replaced the category with awards for Best Video, Short Form, and Best Video Album. For the awards held in 1988 and 1989, the criteria changed and awards for the categories Best Concept Music Video, and Best Performance Music Video were presented. The academy returned to the previous format in 1990, though the categories were renamed Best Music Video, Short Form, and Best Music Video, Long Form. In 1998, the categories were retitled Best Short Form Music Video, and Best Long Form Music Video, respectively.

== Recipients ==
Year	Video	Artist(s)
1988
1988	Land of Confusion	Genesis
1988	Control - The Videos Part II	Janet Jackson
1988	David Lee Roth	David Lee Roth
1988	Day-In Day-Out	David Bowie
1988	The Whole Story	Kate Bush
1989
1989	Fat	"Weird Al" Yankovic
1989	Get a Job	Hampton String Quartet
1989	Storytelling Giant	Talking Heads
1989	This Note's for You	Neil Young
1989	When We Was Fab	George Harrison

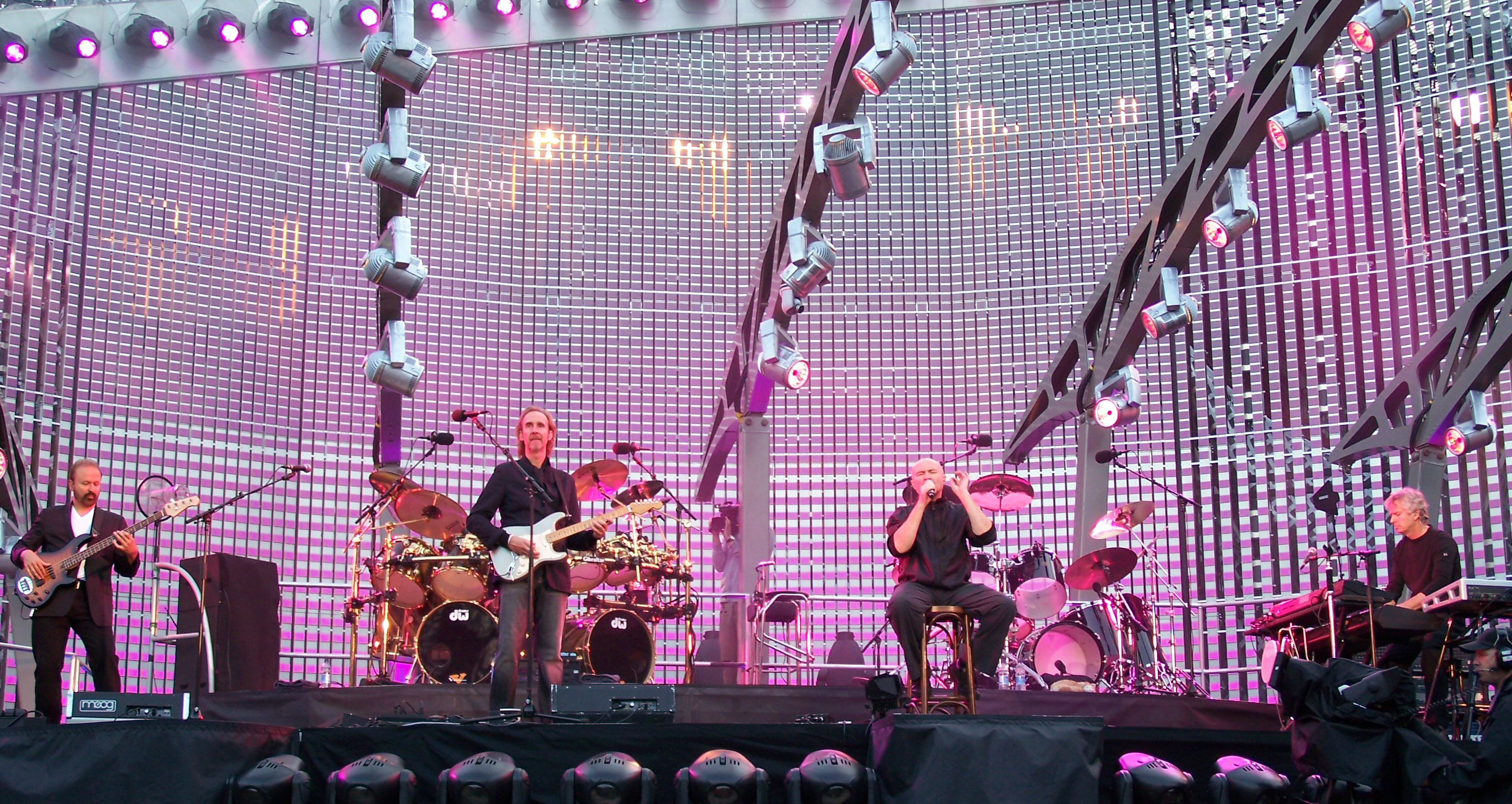
The 1988 award-winning band Genesis performing in 2007

For the 30th Grammy Awards (1988), Best Concept Music Video nominees included David Bowie for "Day-In Day-Out", Kate Bush for The Whole Story, the English rock band Genesis for "Land Of Confusion", David Lee Roth for David Lee Roth, and Janet Jackson for Control – The Videos Part II . The music video for Bowie's "Day-In Day-Out", directed by Julien Temple, included "offending" scenes such as a man urinating on Ronald Reagan's Hollywood Walk of Fame star, which was edited out for television broadcast. Bush's "imaginative" video sampler accompanies her greatest hits album of the same name and includes music videos for songs throughout her career to that point. The music video for "Land of Confusion", a song included on the band's 1986 album Invisible Touch, contained Spitting Image puppets of Ronald Reagan, Margaret Thatcher and other notable individuals. David Lee Roth's self-titled video consisted of promotional clips created for his debut solo EP Crazy from the Heat and album Eat 'Em and Smile. Jackson's video collection, which was certified gold in the United States, contained six promotional videos recorded for singles from her album Control. Awards were presented to members of Genesis (Tony Banks, Phil Collins, and Mike Rutherford) as the performing artists, Jim Yukich and John Lloyd as the video directors, and Jon Blair as the video producer.

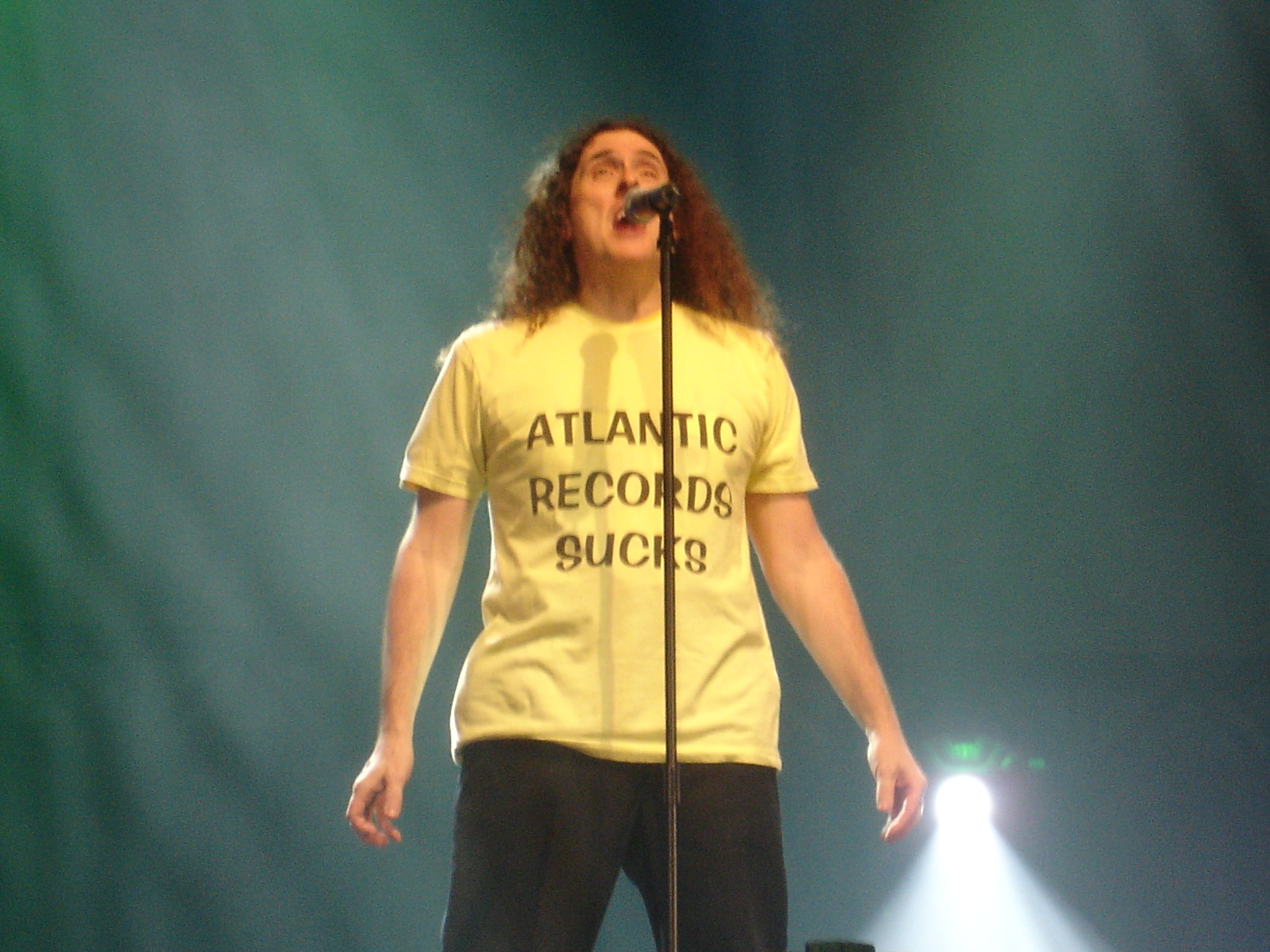
1989 award recipient "Weird Al" Yankovic in 2007

Nominees for the 31st Grammy Awards were the Hampton String Quartet for "Get a Job", George Harrison for "When We Was Fab", the American rock band Talking Heads for Storytelling Giant, "Weird Al" Yankovic for "Fat", and Neil Young for "This Note's for You". "Get a Job", a song recorded originally by the American group The Silhouettes, appears on the Hampton String Quartet's album What If Mozart Wrote "Roll Over Beethoven", a collection of 1950s R&B and pop music songs performed in the styles of Beethoven, Debussy, Mozart, and other composers. "When We Was Fab", a song from the album Cloud Nine, is constructed from quotations written when The Beatles were at the height of their fame and features Harrison playing a sitar. The music video shows Elton John dressed as a walrus, a reference to the 1967 song "I Am the Walrus". Storytelling Giants is a collection of Talking Heads' music videos and additional material linking them together. Two of the nominated music videos had connections to Michael Jackson; "Fat" is a parody of Jackson's song "Bad", and the video for "This Note's for You" depicts a Jackson look-alike's hair catching fire; a parody of an incident that occurred during a shoot for a Pepsi television advertisement in 1984. In the "Fat" video, Yankovic becomes a "grossly overweight guy" through the use of cosmetics and special effects, and leads a group of overweight people on a parade. The award was presented to Yankovic as the performing artist, along with Jay Levey as the video director and Susan Zwerman as the video producer.

== See also ==
- Latin Grammy Award for Best Long Form Music Video
- Latin Grammy Award for Best Short Form Music Video
- List of awards and nominations received by Genesis
- List of songs by "Weird Al" Yankovic
