= The Man with the Horn (song) =

Song by Phil Collins
- A-side: Sussudio" (UK single) "One More Night" (US single)
- Released: 1984
- Recorded: 1982
- Genre: Rock
- Length: 3:55
- Label: Atlantic; Virgin; WEA
- Songwriter: Phil Collins
- Producers: Phil Collins; Hugh Padgham

"The Man with the Horn" is a song performed by Genesis' drummer Phil Collins, and released as a B-side for two singles from No Jacket Required (1985). The song was originally recorded during sessions for Collins' second studio album, Hello, I Must Be Going!, in 1982, although it appeared as the B-side to "Sussudio" in the UK, and as the B-side to "One More Night" in the United States. The song was re-written for an episode of Miami Vice in which Collins guest-starred called "Phil the Shill". The song was renamed "(Life Is a) Rat Race". Collins has said he has "no emotional attachment" to the song. The song was rereleased as a single, and as part of the Other Sides album in 2019. Before being re-released, it charted at #38 on the Mainstream Rock Chart, in 1985.

== Personnel ==
- Phil Collins – vocals, drums, percussion, piano
- Daryl Stuermer – guitars
- John Giblin – bass guitar
- Don Myrick – tenor saxophone solo
