= No Jacket Required =

Studio album by Phil Collins
- Released: 18 February 1985
- Recorded: May–December 1984
- Studios: The Townhouse (London); AIR Studios (London); Old Croft (Shalford, Surrey)
- Genres: Rock; dance-pop; pop
- Length: 46:12
- Labels: Virgin (UK); Atlantic (US)
- Producers: Phil Collins; Hugh Padgham

Phil Collins chronology
Hello, I Must Be Going! (1982)	No Jacket Required (1985)	12″ers (1987)

Singles from No Jacket Required
- 1. "Sussudio" Released: 14 January 1985 (UK); 2. "One More Night" Released: 24 January 1985 (US); 3. "Don't Lose My Number" Released: 1 July 1985 (US/EU); 4. "Take Me Home" Released: 15 July 1985 (UK)

No Jacket Required is the third studio album by the English drummer and singer-songwriter Phil Collins. It was released on 18 February 1985 by Virgin Records in the UK and by Atlantic and WEA internationally.

After finishing touring commitments with Genesis and working with Eric Clapton in 1984, Collins resumed his solo career and started work on a new album. He made a conscious decision to write more uptempo and dance-oriented songs, as much of his previous material was influenced by matters surrounding his first divorce. The album features Helen Terry, Peter Gabriel, and Sting as guest backing vocalists. Some songs, like "Don't Lose My Number" and "Sussudio", were based around improvisation, and others, like "Long Long Way to Go", had a political message.

No Jacket Required was received favourably by the majority of critics and was a huge worldwide commercial success, reaching number 1 in the UK for five consecutive weeks and for seven non-consecutive weeks in the US. It was the second-best-selling album of 1985 in the UK, behind Dire Straits' Brothers in Arms. "One More Night", "Sussudio", "Don't Lose My Number" and "Take Me Home" were released as singles with corresponding music videos. All four were Top 10 hits on the Billboard Hot 100 chart, with "Sussudio" and "One More Night" reaching number 1. The three singles released in the UK all reached the Top 20. Some tracks were featured on the television shows Miami Vice and Cold Case, and "The Man with the Horn" was re-written and re-recorded for the episode "Phil the Shill".

In 1991, one the songs of this album, "Who Said I Would", was released as a live single from his 1990 live album Serious Hits... Live!, it reached the Billboard Hot 100 at number 73.

In 2001, No Jacket Required was certified Diamond by the Recording Industry Association of America for selling 12 million copies in the US and amassed worldwide sales of over 25 million copies, making it one of the best-selling albums of all time. It won three Grammy Awards, including Album of the Year. The No Jacket Required World Tour saw Collins perform 85 concerts which culminated with a performance at both Live Aid shows in London and Philadelphia. Remixes of six songs from the album were released on the compilation 12"ers (1987). In 2010, it was among ten albums nominated for the best British album of the previous 30 years by the Brit Awards. It ranked No. 74 on the Rock and Roll Hall of Fame's "Definitive 200" list. A remastered deluxe edition with updated artwork and bonus tracks was released in 2016, and a remix by Steven Wilson followed in 2025.

== Production and recording ==
After touring commitments with Genesis and completion of work on Eric Clapton's album Behind the Sun, Collins produced Philip Bailey's Chinese Wall with occasional work on his solo material. Upon returning from his wedding honeymoon, he focused more on writing for the album in September 1984 over a period of five weeks. Like previous albums, he demoed the tracks on his 8-track recording setup at Old Croft with a range of drum machines and keyboards, later transferring them onto 24-track for overdubs at The Townhouse including drums, guitars and horns. Sessions for what would become No Jacket Required marked his conscious attempt to move to a more uptempo sound, as much of his previous material was influenced by his first divorce: "I have a notion of what I want to do: break out of this 'love song' box that I've found myself in. I'll make a dance album. Or, at least, an album with a couple of uptempo tracks." Some of the songs emerged from Collins' improvisations with a drum machine, including "One More Night" and "Sussudio". Collins started singing "one more night" to an attempt of making a beat similar to The Jacksons and improvised "sus-sussudio" in another. He tried to replace the lyric with another phrase but decided to keep that way, leading to lyrics about a schoolboy crush on a girl at his school. Another song created mostly through improvisation, "Don't Lose My Number", was described by Collins as having been written mostly during the recordings for his first solo album, Face Value. Collins added that he does not fully understand the meaning of the lyrics, described by reviewer Stephen Holden of The New York Times as "vague, sketching the outlines of a melodrama but withholding the full story".

Guitarist Daryl Stuermer wrote the music that became "I Don't Wanna Know" in 1983–1984 for the Milwaukee band Oceans as an instrumental called "F Song." Stuermer provided a demo of "F Song" to Collins, and Collins wrote lyrics for it, changing the key from F to E flat. Stuermer would later record it for his first solo album, 1988's Steppin' Out, retaining the Collins title "I Don't Wanna Know" but reverting to the key of F.

Other songs were written with a more personal message. "Long Long Way to Go" is often considered one of Collins' more popular songs never to be released as a single and was at that point in his career his most political song. Former Police lead vocalist Sting provided backing vocals for the song. Sting and Collins first met through Band Aid and would later perform together in Live Aid. Collins was working on a song and thought that Sting, having participated in Band Aid, would relate to it very easily. Collins asked Sting to help him provide vocals for this song, and Sting accepted.

"You know, I was very happily married to Jill, my present wife, when I wrote it, but I had been divorced, my manager was getting divorced, a couple of good friends were getting divorced, and I thought, What's going on? Doesn't anybody stay together any more? The song came from that."

— Phil Collins, stating his inspiration for the song "Doesn't Anybody Stay Together Anymore?", Playboy interview, October 1986

"Doesn't Anybody Stay Together Anymore" is another song in which Collins was making a personal message. The song was made in response to everyone around him getting a divorce, including his manager, friends and himself years before. Collins later said that he sang this at Charles, Prince of Wales' 40th-birthday party, not knowing that the Prince's divorce from his wife, Diana, Princess of Wales, would happen a short time later. The Phil Collins Big Band played this live on tour.

"Take Me Home" is another song in which the meaning was originally very vague. At first listening, it appears that the song is about going home, but this is not true. Collins has stated that the song lyrics refer to a patient in a mental institution, and that it is based on the novel One Flew Over the Cuckoo's Nest. Peter Gabriel, Helen Terry and Sting all provide backing vocals.

"We Said Hello Goodbye" appeared as a B-side to "Take Me Home" and "Don't Lose My Number" originally, and as an "extra track" on the CD release of the album. Producer Arif Mardin composed the beginning portion of the song. A remix of the song with additional guitars and without an orchestra was released the following year (1986) on the soundtrack for the movie, Playing for Keeps. This remixed version received some radio airplay around the time of the soundtrack's release (which coincided with the No Jacket Required period), though it did not chart. Collins has mused that the song is unfairly classed as a "second class citizen", stating that the song would have been looked at differently if it were added to the album. According to The New York Times reviewer Caryn James, the song is "a straightforward comment on leaving home".

"The Man with the Horn" was originally recorded during sessions for Collins' second solo album Hello, I Must Be Going! in 1982. However, the song was not released until it appeared as the B-side to "Sussudio" in the UK and as the B-side to "One More Night" in the United States. Collins has said that he has "no emotional attachment" to the song. Music by The Jackson 5 inspired Collins to write the song "I Like the Way", which also did not appear on the album, originally appearing as the B-side to "One More Night" in the UK and "Sussudio" in the US. He called the song "dodgy" and has cited it among his least favourite of his songs.

== Title and cover ==
"I thought of different things to do. Like maybe going down there wearing the right kind of jacket and ordering a drink and just pouring it onto the floor and saying, 'Well, I've got a jacket on! You can't do anything to me.' Maybe I should smash a few photographs on the wall, a bit of the Robert Plant attitude. But I did nothing, of course. I just moaned about it."

— Phil Collins, Playboy interview, October 1986

The album is named after an incident at The Pump Room restaurant in Chicago, Illinois. Collins, entering the restaurant with former Led Zeppelin lead vocalist Robert Plant, was denied admittance because he did not meet the restaurant's dress code of "jacket required" for dinner, while Plant was allowed in. Collins was wearing a jacket and argued about it. The maître d'hôtel argued that the jacket was not "proper". Collins said in an interview with Playboy that, at that point, he was as angry as he had ever been.

After the incident, Collins often appeared on shows such as Late Night with David Letterman and The Tonight Show Starring Johnny Carson, denouncing the restaurant and telling his story. The management of the restaurant later sent him a complimentary sport coat and an apology letter, stating that he could come to the restaurant wearing whatever he wanted.

The cover image of No Jacket Required (a continuation of the 'facial close-up' theme begun with Face Value) of Collins' face lit by red/orange light was to emphasise the "hot", up-tempo nature of the album. Collins stated in his autobiography Not Dead Yet, that glycerol was sprayed onto his forehead during the photography session to give the illusion of perspiration. In the photography for the album's inner sleeve and subsequent publicity materials, Collins appeared to lampoon the incident at The Pump Room by wearing a suit that was several sizes too big.

== Release and commercial performance ==
No Jacket Required was released on 18 February 1985. The lead singles were "Sussudio" in the UK and "One More Night" in the US. Both songs had music videos that were shot at a London pub owned by Richard Branson, featuring Collins playing both before and after the building closes.

In the first week of March, shortly after Collins won a Grammy for "Against All Odds", the album debuted at the top spot of the UK Albums Chart and 24th in the Billboard 200. It also got to tenth in the German charts and 15th in Canada. By the end of the month, it had climbed to number 1 in America as well. Collins had become the fifteenth British artist to top both the album and single Billboard charts, as "One More Night" was leading the Billboard Hot 100 that same week. The same thing was happening in the UK, where Collins' duet with Philip Bailey, "Easy Lover", was the UK Singles Chart number 1. No Jacket Required was number 1 on the US charts for seven weeks, and on the British chart for five.

"Sussudio" was the first track to be released as a single in the UK, where it peaked at number 12. It was the second single to be released in the US and entered frequent rotation on MTV in May 1985. By 6 July 1985, both the single and the album had reached number 1 on their respective US Billboard charts. "One More Night" was Collins' second US number 1 single, following "Against All Odds" and was his fourth single to reach the Top 10 in the UK, peaking at number 4 on the singles chart.

Meanwhile, "Don't Lose My Number", a single that Collins only released in the US, peaked at number 4 on the Billboard Hot 100 charts during late September 1985, and the B-side of the single was "We Said Hello Goodbye". Collins had difficulty conceptualising a plot for the corresponding music video. He decided to create a gag video based on this difficulty. In the video, he is provided conceptual ideas by various clients and directors. Collins parodies several other videos, including those by Michael Jackson, David Lee Roth, Elton John, The Cars and The Police. The singer also filmed parodies of Mad Max, western films and samurai movies.

"Take Me Home" was the final single released from the album and has been included in all of his concert tours since The No Jacket Required World Tour. It reached number 7 on the US Billboard charts and number 19 on the UK charts. The song was not slated for a single release, but the label decided to do so after it became an airplay hit on several US radio stations who decided to play the track. "Take Me Home" also received a video where Collins sung in various locations around the world.

The studio version of "Who Said I Would" was not released as a single, but a live version from the Serious Hits... Live! album was issued as a single in the US, reaching number 73 on the Billboard Hot 100. A music video of the original version was filmed for the No Jacket Required home video and featured footage of Collins playing the song live. Certain songs that were not released as singles still charted on Billboard charts, including "Inside Out", which went to number 9 on the Hot Mainstream Rock Tracks chart. "The Man with the Horn", though not released as a single (nor was it included on the album), charted at number 38 on the Hot Mainstream Rock Tracks.

No Jacket Required remains Collins' highest-selling album, having sold over 12 million copies as of 2001 in the US, where it was certified diamond status. Twenty years after its release, No Jacket Required remains among the 50 highest-selling albums in the US. In the UK, the album was certified 6× platinum, selling over 1.8 million copies. It has also sold over 20 million copies worldwide. Alternate versions of six songs from No Jacket Required were included on the remix album 12"ers, released in January 1988.

The album was re-released using a flat transfer done by Steve Hoffman for the Audio Fidelity label in 2011. It was reissued as a deluxe edition on CD, vinyl and digital on 15 April 2016, including a new second disc with bonus tracks.

In September 2025, a 40th Anniversary LP Boxset entitled No Jacket Required (Fully Tailored) was released alongside a standalone Blu-ray which contains 2025 Stereo, 5.1 Surround and Dolby Atmos mixes by Steven Wilson, plus a remaster of the Original 1985 Mix.

== No Jacket Required EP (home video) ==
In 1985, Atlantic also released a home video called No Jacket Required EP. The collection consisted of the music videos "Sussudio", "One More Night", "Who Said I Would", "Don't Lose My Number" and "Take Me Home".

== Critical reception ==
Professional ratings
Review scores
Source	Rating
AllMusic	5/5 stars
The Daily Vault	A
Encyclopedia of Popular Music	3/5 stars
The Press	4/5 stars
Record Collector	4/5 stars
The Rolling Stone Album Guide	3.5/5 stars
Sounds	3 2/3/5
The Village Voice	C
Record Mirror	5/5 stars

The reception for the album was mostly positive. Geoff Orens of AllMusic, in a retrospective review, said that while some of the songs are "dated", the album contains "standout tracks". He describes "Long Long Way to Go" as "one of Collins' most effective ballads" and "Take Me Home" as "pulsating". Orens went on to say "It's not a completely satisfying recording, but it is the best example of one of the most dominating and influential styles of the 1980s." Lori E. Pike of the Los Angeles Times said that "Collins' recipe of tense vocals spiced with saucy horns and splashy electro-jitterbugging synthesisers often leaves little room for real feeling to squeeze through. When he slows down and lets his smoldering moodiness take over, the effect is magical."

Stephen Holden of The New York Times said that the album was "refreshing" and that Collins was "adept" at setting a suspenseful or menacing mood. Holden described "Only You Know and I Know" as an "angry love song" that had some sampling of Motown-style music mixed in. "In 'One More Night', Mr. Collins's recent number-one hit, a ticking snare drum injects a whisper of lurking fear into a song that suggests a sweeter, tenderer reprise of 'Against All Odds'", says Holden. Holden concluded by saying "On the surface, No Jacket Required, is an album bursting with soulful hooks and bright peppy tunes. But beneath its shiny exterior, Mr. Collins' drums and his voice carry on a disjunctive, enigmatic dialogue between heart and mind, obsession and repression."

"His effortless graft of bright white-R&B bounce to quirky, unexpected melodies is instinctively commercial but never feels overly contrived."

— David Fricke, Rolling Stone review, 9 May 1985

Rolling Stone reviewer David Fricke said "Phil Collins' sudden transformation from the balding bantam drummer for a prosperous British art-rock group into a mainstream pop heartthrob might seem one of the Eighties' most improbable success stories. But judging from the sly craft and warm, low-key humour of his solo records and his successful productions for Philip Bailey and Frida, Collins' newfound fame was inevitable." Robert Hilburn of the Los Angeles Times originally disliked the song "One More Night", but later praised the song, saying that "Collins' soulful but polite vocal style is also capable of capturing the pain of going through yet one more night without her." The Dallas Morning News writer Lennox Samuels said that "No Jacket Required (Atlantic) is what fans have come to expect from Phil Collins—lots of horns and syncopation, heavy rhythm."

Even those who were not normally fans of Collins' work liked the album. Michael R. Smith of The Daily Vault wrote "Anomaly or not, it is indeed the album that Phil deserves to be remembered for." Stephen Williams of Newsday said that the album was "loaded with musical hooks and textured arrangements... it also lacks the tense edge that was part of Collins' work with Genesis." Keegan Hamilton of the Riverfront Times said that the album was "The 80's Dance Pop Special: A smooth synthesiser groove, with an order of keyboards, drum machines, and horns on the side," adding that "Sussudio" was the best track on the album, saying that it's "catchy gibberish". Hamilton says that "One More Night" was the worst song on the album, saying that "The album's introspective slow jam wallows in self-pity."

On the negative side, Marty Racine of the Houston Chronicle said that "I Don't Wanna Know" and "Take Me Home" were the only songs to "rise above the crowd" and that Collins focused too much on his singing and less on his drumming, "which can be captivating". Racine also added that the album makes the listener feel a little "cold", but admired that the singer was "playing the game as well as anyone".

Writing an article in defence of Collins in 2010, Gary Mills of The Quietus described the album as "determined dross" which Collins did not deserve to have his career judged by. In 2013, music critic Tom Service of The Guardian was similarly scathing, saying the album had not stood the test of time and was "unlistenable to today", singling out "Sussudio" for particular criticism, arguing: "the production, the drum machine, the inane sincerity of the lyrics; there's no colder or more superficial sound in popular music, precisely because it takes itself so seriously." He also compared it unfavourably with the enduring appeal of Collins' 1980s contemporaries such as the Human League and—in particular—the Pet Shop Boys, saying the latter were "geniuses by comparison".

At the 28th Annual Grammy Awards, Collins was nominated in five categories. The album won the award for Album of the Year, and Collins won Best Pop Vocal Performance, Male. Collins shared the Producer of the Year (Non-Classical) award with co-producer of the album, Hugh Padgham. The home video No Jacket Required EP received a nomination for Best Music Video, Short Form. In 1986 the album received an American Music Award nomination for Favorite Pop/Rock Album. At the Brit Awards in 1986 the album received an award for British Album of the Year.

== Influence and legacy ==
At the Brit Awards in 2010, the album was one of ten nominees for Brits Album of 30 Years in a poll of BBC Radio 2 listeners; the winner was (What's the Story) Morning Glory? by Oasis. "Sussudio" is one of Collins' most famous songs and is referenced in many different media, including books, stand-up comedy acts and television shows. He has said that this is the song people most often sing to him when they spot him on the street. In the book and film adaptation of American Psycho, main character Patrick Bateman briefly discusses it, amongst other work by Collins. The synthesiser riff was heavily criticised for sounding too much like Prince's 1982 song "1999", a similarity that Collins does not deny, citing that he is a big fan of Prince's work.

Three songs recorded during the No Jacket Required sessions aired on episodes of the television show Miami Vice. "Take Me Home" appeared in "The Prodigal Son", the premiere of the second season. "Long Long Way to Go" was played in the closing scene of the season 2 finale "Sons and Lovers", during the funeral for Ricardo Tubbs' girlfriend and son. "The Man with the Horn" was re-written for an episode of Vice in which Collins guest-starred as a con artist who gets in trouble with cocaine distributors. The re-written version was titled "Life Is a Rat Race".

"Take Me Home" was the closing theme song for the World Wrestling Federation's television show, Saturday Night's Main Event for several years in the late 1980s. In 2003, the hip-hop group Bone Thugs-n-Harmony based their song "Home" on this single. That version of the song featured the original song's chorus and hit number 19 on the UK charts.

As years went on, Collins became unhappy with the album and grew to dislike it. In a 2016 interview with Rolling Stone, he said in retrospect that it is among his least favourite records he had made: "At the time, I wasn't being me. I've grown up a bit now and much prefer to play songs that are me. I only play a bit part in that one."

== Tour ==
The album was followed by a concert tour in 1985 named The No Jacket Required World Tour. For the tour, Collins retained his usual cast of musicians, including Chester Thompson, Leland Sklar and Daryl Stuermer. The band was nicknamed the "Hot Tub Club". A television special was recorded in Dallas and aired on HBO, titled "No Jacket Required... Sold Out". Another television special was recorded for Cinemax for a show titled "Album Flash", taped in London, England at the Royal Albert Hall.

Reception for the tour was positive as well. Rick Kogan of the Chicago Tribune said that "After hearing and observing Collins' eminently satisfying and frequently spectacular two-hour performance, one is left not with a series of niggling questions about his popularity but rather with renewed admiration for the forcefulness of well crafted songs played in a straightforward manner."

In interviews during the tour, it was remarked by interviewers that the singer appeared similar to actors Bob Hoskins and Danny DeVito. Collins joked that all three of them could play the Three Bears from the story Goldilocks and the Three Bears. DeVito heard the idea and contacted Collins and Hoskins about making a film. Collins researched bears, and a script was planned. Kim Basinger reportedly wished to play the role of "Goldilocks". However, problems arose (mostly involving the script), and all three actors abandoned the film.

While on the No Jacket Required tour, Collins recorded a song for the movie White Nights, titled "Separate Lives". The song, which was written by Collins' friend Stephen Bishop, was a duet that Collins performed with Marilyn Martin. In the US, the song went to number 1 on the Billboard Hot 100, and it reached number 4 on the UK charts.

=== Live Aid ===
The No Jacket Required World Tour ended with Collins performing at both the Wembley Stadium and JFK Stadium Live Aid concerts. Collins claims that it all happened by accident and that both he and the Power Station were going to attend both Live Aid shows as well, but "they all chickened out." "By default, I was the only one who did it," he later claimed. Bob Geldof, the organiser of Live Aid, originally asked Collins to be part of Geldof's first charity effort, Band Aid. Collins played the drums and performed backing vocals for Band Aid's UK chart-topping hit in 1984, "Do They Know It's Christmas?".

Collins first performed with Sting at Wembley, and together they performed "In the Air Tonight", "Against All Odds", "Long Long Way to Go" and "Every Breath You Take", accompanied by saxophonist Branford Marsalis. After Collins finished performing, he flew on Concorde to the Live Aid show in Philadelphia. On the plane, he met Cher and convinced her to be a part of the event. Once there he met Robert Plant, who had asked him if he would perform with him, Jimmy Page, John Paul Jones and Tony Thompson in a Led Zeppelin "reunion" of sorts. He first played drums on "Layla", "White Room" and "She's Waiting" for his friend Eric Clapton. Then, Collins performed "Against All Odds" and "In the Air Tonight" and finished the night playing drums for Led Zeppelin's aforementioned act. The band has claimed that the performance was unspectacular, and critics place the blame on Collins. However, Collins says that "I would pledge to my dying day that it wasn't me," and that Thompson was racing through some of the performance. Collins later remarked, "... I remember in the middle of the thing, I actually thought, How do I get out of here?" Stephen Williams of Newsday commented that Collins' performance of "In the Air Tonight" in Philadelphia "was one of the more moving moments of the day". Live Aid raised $69 million in its effort. Collins later recalled the event as "extraordinary".

== Track listing ==
All lyrics are written by Phil Collins; all music is composed by Collins, except where noted.

Side one
No.	Title	Music	Length
1.	"Sussudio"		4:23
2.	"Only You Know and I Know"	Daryl Stuermer	4:20
3.	"Long Long Way to Go"		4:20
4.	"I Don't Wanna Know"	Stuermer	4:12
5.	"One More Night"		4:47

Side two
No.	Title	Music	Length
6.	"Don't Lose My Number"		4:46
7.	"Who Said I Would"		4:01
8.	"Doesn't Anybody Stay Together Anymore"	Collins; Stuermer	4:18
9.	"Inside Out"		5:14
10.	"Take Me Home"		5:51
Total length:			46:12

Bonus track on compact disc release
No.	Title	Length
11.	"We Said Hello Goodbye"	4:15
Total length:		50:27

Extra Large Jacket Required bonus disc (Disc two of 2016 deluxe edition)
No.	Title	Writer(s)	Length
1.	"Sussudio" (live 1990)		7:18
2.	"Don't Lose My Number" (live 1997)		5:00
3.	"Who Said I Would" (live 1985)		4:32
4.	"Long Long Way to Go" (live 1997)		3:56
5.	"Only You Know and I Know" (live 1994)	Collins; Stuermer	4:52
6.	"Easy Lover" (live 1997)	Philip Bailey; Collins; Nathan East	5:03
7.	"Inside Out" (live 1990)		5:31
8.	"Doesn't Anybody Stay Together Anymore" (live 1990)	Collins; Stuermer	5:56
9.	"One More Night" (live 1990)		5:54
10.	"Take Me Home" (live 1990)		8:54
11.	"Only You Know and I Know" (demo)	Collins; Stuermer	3:43
12.	"One More Night" (demo)		4:41
13.	"Take Me Home" (demo)		5:22
Total length:			1:10:42

Notes

- "We Said Hello Goodbye" was released as a bonus track on the CD version of No Jacket Required. It was not available on the original vinyl or cassette releases and was not included on the 2016 vinyl reissue of the album, but was included on the 2016 CD and digital download/streaming reissue.

== Personnel ==
Adapted from Phil Collins' official website.

Musicians

- Phil Collins – vocals, backing vocals, Roland TR-909 (1, 10), keyboards (2, 3, 5–11), bass (2), drums (2, 4, 6–11), LinnDrum (2, 6, 8), Roland TR-808 (3, 5), Simmons electronic drums (credited on 2016 release as 'Simmonds') (3, 7), vocoder (7), kalimba (7)
- David Frank – keyboards (1, 7), Minimoog bass (1, 7), Oberheim DMX (1), additional keyboards (6)
- Nick Glennie-Smith – keyboards (11)
- Daryl Stuermer – guitars (1–10), keyboards (4)
- Leland Sklar – bass guitar (3–6, 8–11), piccolo bass (3, 10)
- The Phenix Horns, arranged by Tom Tom 84 – horns (1, 2, 7)
  - Don Myrick – saxophones, sax solo (5, 9)
  - Louis Satterfield – trombone
  - Michael Harris – trumpet
  - Rahmlee Michael Davis – trumpet
- Gary Barnacle – sax solo (4, 7)
- Arif Mardin – string arrangements (5), orchestral introduction (11)
- Sting – backing vocals (3, 4, 10)
- Peter Gabriel – backing vocals (10)
- Helen Terry – backing vocals (10)

Production

- Phil Collins – producer, mixing, album design
- Hugh Padgham – producer, engineer, mixing
- Steve Chase – assistant engineer
- Jon Jacobs – string recording at AIR Studios (London)
- Peter Ashworth – cover photography

== Charts ==
=== Weekly charts ===
Chart (1985)	Peak position
Australian Albums (Kent Music Report)	1
Canada Top Albums/CDs (RPM)	1
Austrian Albums (Ö3 Austria)	11
Dutch Albums (Album Top 100)	1
European Albums (Music & Media)	1
Finnish Albums (The Official Finnish Charts)	5
French Albums (SNEP)	6
German Albums (Offizielle Top 100)	1
Italian Albums (Musica e Dischi)	4
Japanese Albums (Oricon)	4
New Zealand Albums (RMNZ)	1
Norwegian Albums (VG-lista)	1
Spanish Albums (AFYVE)	1
Swedish Albums (Sverigetopplistan)	1
Swiss Albums (Schweizer Hitparade)	1
UK Albums (Official Charts)	1
US Billboard 200	1

Chart (2016–2020)	Peak position
Australian Albums (ARIA)	42
Belgian Albums (Ultratop Flanders)	54
Belgian Albums (Ultratop Wallonia)	76
French Albums (SNEP)	112
Hungarian Albums (MAHASZ)	20
Italian Albums (FIMI)	63

=== Year-end charts ===
Chart (1985)	Position
Canada Top Albums/CDs (RPM)	1
US Billboard 200	6
Chart (1986)	Position
Canada Top Albums/CDs (RPM)	32
US Billboard 200	9

== Certifications ==
Sales certifications for No Jacket Required
Region	Certification	Certified units/sales
Argentina (CAPIF)	3× Platinum	180,000^{^}
Australia (ARIA)	Platinum	300,000
Austria (IFPI Austria)	Platinum	50,000^{*}
Belgium (BRMA)	Platinum	50,000^{*}
Canada (Music Canada)	Diamond	1,300,000
Finland (Musiikkituottajat)	Gold	34,203
France (SNEP)	2× Platinum	600,000^{*}
Germany (BVMI)	3× Platinum	1,500,000^{^}
Hong Kong (IFPI Hong Kong)	Platinum	20,000^{*}
Italy (FIMI)	Gold	100,000
Netherlands (NVPI)	Platinum	100,000^{^}
New Zealand (RMNZ)	Platinum	15,000^{^}
Spain (Promusicae)	Platinum	100,000^{^}
Switzerland (IFPI Switzerland)	2× Platinum	100,000^{^}
United Kingdom (BPI)	6× Platinum	1,934,912
United States (RIAA)	12× Platinum	12,000,000^{^}
Summaries
Worldwide	—	25,000,000
^{*} Sales figures based on certification alone.^{^} Shipments figures based on certification alone.

== See also ==
- List of best-selling albums
- List of best-selling albums in Germany
- List of best-selling albums in the United States
