= Who Said I Would =

1985 song by Phil Collins

Song by Phil Collins

from the album No Jacket Required
- Released: 18 February 1985
- Recorded: 1984
- Genre: Dance-rock; new wave; power pop
- Length: 4:01
- Label: Virgin
- Songwriter: Phil Collins
- Producers: Phil Collins; Hugh Padgham

"Who Said I Would (Live)"

Single by Phil Collins

from the album Serious Hits... Live!
- B-side: "Doesn't Anybody Stay Together Anymore?" (live)
- Released: February 1991 (US)
- Recorded: 1990
- Genre: Dance-rock; new wave; power pop
- Length: 4:02
- Label: Atlantic; Virgin; WEA
- Songwriter: Phil Collins
- Producers: Phil Collins; Robert Colby

Phil Collins singles chronology
"Hang in Long Enough" (1990)	"Who Said I Would (Live)" (1991)	"Hero" (1993)

Music video
- "Who Said I Would" (Serious Hits... Live! performance) on YouTube

"Who Said I Would" is a song performed by Phil Collins that was originally recorded for his 1985 album No Jacket Required but was released in 1991 as a single from his live album Serious Hits... Live! in the United States and Japan.

== History ==
Collins originally wrote and recorded the song for his 1985 album, No Jacket Required. In 1991, a live recording of the song was released as the sole single from the Serious Hits... Live! album in the United States, reaching number 73 on the Billboard Hot 100.

The original version was later remixed into the 12"ers album.

== Music video ==
A music video of the original version was filmed for the No Jacket Required home video. It featured Collins playing the song during a concert. The single version also had a music video of Collins playing the song during his ...But Seriously tour. Only the second video is available on Phil Collins' YouTube channel.

== Credits ==
=== Studio version ===
- Phil Collins – vocals, vocoder, Simmons drums, kalimba
- David Frank – keyboards, Minimoog bass
- Daryl Stuermer – guitars
- Gary Barnacle – sax solo
- The Phenix Horns
  - Don Myrick – saxophone
  - Louis Satterfield – trombone
  - Rhamlee Michael Davis – trumpet
  - Michael Harris – trumpet

=== Live version ===
- Phil Collins – lead vocals
- Brad Cole – keyboards
- Daryl Stuermer – guitar
- Leland Sklar – bass
- Chester Thompson – drums
- The Phenix Horns
  - Don Myrick – saxophone
  - Louis Satterfield – trombone
  - Harry Kim and Rhamlee Michael Davis – trumpets
- Arnold McCuller, Bridgette Bryant and Fred White – backing vocals

== Charts ==
Chart (1991)	Peak position
Canada Top Singles (RPM)	34
US Billboard Hot 100	73
U.S. Cash Box Top 100	67
