= One More Night (Phil Collins song) =

Single by Phil Collins

from the album No Jacket Required
- B-side: "I Like the Way"; "The Man with the Horn" (US)
- Released: 24 January 1985 (US): 1 April 1985 (UK)
- Recorded: May–June 1984
- Studio: The Townhouse, London and Old Croft, Surrey
- Genre: Soft rock
- Length: 4:51 (album version) 4:22 (7" version)
- Label: Atlantic; Virgin
- Songwriter: Phil Collins
- Producers: Phil Collins; Hugh Padgham

Phil Collins singles chronology
"Sussudio" (1985)	"One More Night" (1985)	"Don't Lose My Number" (1985)

Music video
- "One More Night" on YouTube

"One More Night" is the first single in the United States and second in the United Kingdom from Phil Collins' third studio album, the Diamond-certified No Jacket Required. "One More Night" was Phil Collins' second U.S. No. 1 single, following "Against All Odds", and was his fourth single to reach the top ten in the UK, peaking at No. 4 on the UK Singles Chart.

In the U.S., the single entered the Billboard Hot 100 at number 50 on the chart dated 9 February 1985. It hit number one seven weeks later and remained on top for two weeks. In the UK, the single was certified silver by the British Phonographic Industry. It was also his first No. 1 on the U.S. Adult contemporary chart.

The soft rock ballad remained for two weeks at the top in the U.S. in early 1985, until it was surpassed by "We Are the World" by USA for Africa on 13 April 1985. It has also been included on the compilation albums Hits (1998), The Platinum Collection (2004), Love Songs: A Compilation... Old and New (2004) and The Singles (2016).

It was also released on the 2008 EMI TV compilation album 101 Love Songs with "Against All Odds (Take a Look at Me Now)".

== History ==
Collins was playing around with his drum machine (a Roland TR-808) when he started saying the chorus of the song. He later recalled that the writing of the song, which has no hook, was completed "very quickly". Its B-side in the UK was "I Like the Way", while the US received "The Man with the Horn".

== Music video ==
The song's music video, directed by Jim Yukich, features Collins playing the piano in a downtown bar.

The bar is The Princess Victoria, at 1 Becklow Road, Shepherd's Bush in West London. It is seen in an interior and exterior shot, as Collins leaves and walks away into the night as the song fades out. At the time, it was owned by Richard Branson. The same bar interior was used for the "Sussudio" video, but looking different because the bar is closed and shot in a sepia tone, while "Sussudio" was full-colored. This video is a segue from the music video for "Sussudio". The full version of both clips without a break was included in Phil Collins' long-form music video release "The Singles Collection".

One inconsistency in the video is that Collins is playing a Yamaha CP-70 electric piano, but the recording uses a Yamaha DX-7 synthesiser for the electric piano part. Collins used either this or a Fender Rhodes for the early live performances of the song, switching to the Yamaha CP-70 electric piano for the Seriously Live Tour and later performances.

Guitarist Daryl Stuermer makes an appearance, as does Phenix Horns member Don Myrick, who plays the sax solo which closes the tune.

== Critical reception ==
Robert Hilburn of the Los Angeles Times originally disliked the song "One More Night", but later praised it, saying that "Collins' soulful but polite vocal style is also capable of capturing the pain of going through yet one more night without her". Isaac Guzman of the New York Daily News said that the song brought about "snuggle-inspiring tenderness".

However, Keegan Hamilton of the Riverfront Times said that the song was the worst track on the album, saying that "The album's introspective slow jam wallows in self-pity." "It's minimalist, as far as the '80s go, relying mostly on a shaker, a crisp drum machine and echoing keyboards. It ends with a saxophone solo so smooth that I can't believe it's not butter," adds Keegan.

Cash Box said that the song is "gentle, free-flowing and touching and lives up to Collins’ usual high standards as a writer/producer/performer."

The song has also been an occasional cover song for ex-Veruca Salt frontwoman Nina Gordon during live appearances. An extended version of the song appeared on the 12"ers album.

== Track listing ==
=== 7": Virgin / VS755 (UK) ===
1. "One More Night" (edit) – 4:25
2. "I Like the Way"

=== 7": Atlantic / 7-89588 (U.S.) ===
1. "One More Night" (edit) – 4:25
2. "The Man with the Horn"

=== 12": Virgin / VS755-12 (UK) ===
1. "One More Night" (Extended Mix) – 6:24
2. "I Like the Way"

=== CD: WEA International / WPCR 2064 (Japan) ===
1. "One More Night"
2. "I Like the Way"

== Charts ==
=== Weekly charts ===
Chart (1985)	Peak position
Argentina (CAPIF)	7
Australia (Kent Music Report)	2
Austria (Ö3 Austria Top 40)	6
Belgium (Ultratop 50 Flanders)	9
Bolivia (UPI)	6
Canada Retail Singles (The Record)	2
Canada Top Singles (RPM)	1
Europe (European Hot 100 Singles)	3
Finland (Suomen virallinen lista)	18
France (SNEP)	24
Germany (GfK)	10
Ireland (IRMA)	4
Netherlands (Dutch Top 40)	15
Netherlands (Single Top 100)	8
New Zealand (Recorded Music NZ)	5
Paraguay (UPI)	4
South Africa (Springbok)	21
Spain (AFYVE)	14
Switzerland (Schweizer Hitparade)	6
UK Singles (Official Charts)	4
UK Airplay (Music & Media)	4
Uruguay (UPI)	4
US Billboard Hot 100	1
US Adult Contemporary (Billboard)	1
US Hot R&B/Hip-Hop Songs (Billboard)	80
US Mainstream Rock Airplay (Billboard)	4

=== Year-end charts ===
Chart (1985)	Position
Australia (Kent Music Report)	46
Canada (RPM Magazine)	22
US Top Pop Singles (Billboard)	33

== Certifications ==
Region	Certification	Certified units/sales
New Zealand (RMNZ)	Gold	15,000^{‡}
United Kingdom (BPI)	Silver	250,000^{^}
United States (RIAA)	Gold	500,000^{^}
^{^} Shipments figures based on certification alone.^{‡} Sales+streaming figures based on certification alone.

== Credits and personnel ==
=== Recording ===
- Recorded at The Townhouse, London and Old Croft, Surrey

=== Personnel ===
- Phil Collins – vocals, songwriter, producer, Roland TR-808, Yamaha DX7, backing vocals
- Hugh Padgham – producer
- Daryl Stuermer – guitars
- Leland Sklar – bass guitar
- Don Myrick – alto saxophone solo
- Arif Mardin – string arrangements

== See also ==
- List of Hot 100 number-one singles of 1985 (U.S.)
- List of number-one adult contemporary singles of 1985 (U.S.)
