= Sussudio =

1985 single by Phil Collins

Single by Phil Collins

from the album No Jacket Required
- B-side: "The Man with the Horn"; "I Like the Way" (US)
- Released: 14 January 1985
- Genre: Funk; dance-pop; R&B
- Length: 4:23 (album version); 6:36 (extended version)
- Label: Virgin; Atlantic
- Songwriter: Phil Collins
- Producers: Phil Collins; Hugh Padgham

Phil Collins singles chronology
"Easy Lover" (1984)	"Sussudio" (1985)	"One More Night" (1985)

Audio sample
- file; help

Music video
- "Phil Collins – Sussudio (Official Music Video)" on YouTube

"Sussudio" is a song by the English singer-songwriter Phil Collins. It was released on 14 January 1985 in the United Kingdom by Virgin Records as the lead single from his third solo studio album, No Jacket Required (1985). The song served as the second single from the album in the United States, being released on 30 April 1985 by Atlantic Records, following "One More Night". The song's title is a pseudoword Collins randomly came up with during a practice session.

Upon release in the US, "Sussudio" entered frequent rotation on MTV in May, reaching number one on the US Billboard Hot 100 in July. The song also peaked at number 12 on the UK singles chart. Internationally, it topped the charts in Panama and Peru; and reached the top-ten in 10 other countries.

== Production and recording ==
Collins has said that he "improvised" the lyrics. Collins was playing around with a drum machine, and the lyric "su-sussudio" was what came out of his mouth. "So I kinda knew I had to find something else for that word, then I went back and tried to find another word that scanned as well as 'sussudio,' and I couldn't find one, so I went back to 'sussudio'", Collins said. According to Collins, the lyrics are about a schoolboy's crush on a girl at school.

The synthesizer, rhythm and synth bass arrangement, sound design, and programming was done by David Frank of the American synth-pop duo the System, and the horn arrangements were done later based on the motif from the bassline.

== Music video ==
The music video for the song was filmed at a pub owned at the time by Richard Branson, the Princess Victoria in Shepherd's Bush, West London. The accompanying music video features Collins, as well as long-time collaborators Daryl Stuermer and Chester Thompson. The video begins with a man telling his family he is taking his dog for a walk, with them ignoring him while watching TV (which happens to be playing the music video for Phil Collins' debut solo single "In the Air Tonight"). He passes outside a pub, with live music being played. It then cuts to Collins and his band inside playing for an uninterested crowd. The crowd slowly migrates toward the band as the song progresses, leaving them cheering at the end. Bassist Leland Sklar also appears in the video, although neither Sklar nor Thompson played on the studio recording, due to synth bass and drum machines being used instead.

== Critical reception ==
Some music critics have suggested that the song sounds very similar to Prince's 1982 song "1999". Collins does not deny the similarity between the two songs; he stated that he is a fan of Prince's work and remembers listening to "1999" frequently while he was on tour with Genesis. Tom Breihan of Stereogum commented in 2020 that "in making funky dance-pop, Collins committed the same sin as almost everyone else who made funky dance-pop in the mid-'80s: he bit Prince." According to Breihan, "if something like that happened today, Collins would've at least had to give Prince a songwriting credit." Breihan acknowledged that "even if one groove is a distinct copy of another, everything else is different."

Some critics praised the song. Keegan Hamilton, of the Riverfront Times, said that the song was the best track on the album, saying that it's "catchy gibberish. Even though this song isn't on the Flashdance soundtrack, it makes me want to put on some goofy legwarmers and kick out an aerobics routine. Where the vast majority of artists from this era try out the synthesizer/keyboard/horn section soup and fail miserably, Collins seems to have the recipe down to a science," Hamilton adds. Robert Hilburn of the Los Angeles Times thought the song had a "friskier R&B style" as compared to Collins' other songs, and agreed that it sounded very much like the Prince song. Michael R. Smith of The Daily Vault believed that "Sussudio" was the best track on the album, calling it a "monster track"; he also added that:

This is a song that chugs and churns along at a gingerly pace, set to a beat that is sure to get car speakers thumping. At the time, it was like nothing you had ever heard before on the radio. The word "Sussudio" may not have meant anything, but the song itself was pure magic.

Other reviewers have criticised the song. David Fricke of Rolling Stone said that songs like "Sussudio", with the heavy use of a horn section, were "beginning to wear thin." In 2001, the chief rock and pop critic of The Guardian, Alexis Petridis, called the song a "vapid funk workout". In 2013, Tom Service, also of The Guardian, wrote: "Sussudio brings me out in a cold sweat; the production, the drum machine, the inane sincerity of the lyrics; there's no colder or more superficial sound in popular music, precisely because it takes itself so seriously."

"Sussudio" was the first track released as a single in the UK and the second to be released in the US. In the UK, the song reached number 12. In the US, the song entered frequent rotation on MTV in May and, by 6 July, both the single and the album had reached No. 1 on their respective US Billboard charts. A version of the song appeared on Collins' remix album 12″ers (1987).

== Track listings ==
7-inch: Virgin / VS736 (UK)

1. "Sussudio"
2. "The Man with the Horn"

7-inch: Atlantic / 7-89560 (US)

1. "Sussudio"
2. "I Like the Way"

12-inch: Virgin / VS736-12 (UK)

1. "Sussudio" (extended remix)
2. "Sussudio"
3. "The Man with the Horn"

CD: WEA International / WPCR 2065 (Japan)

1. "Sussudio"
2. "Sussudio" (extended mix)

== Personnel ==
- Phil Collins – vocals, Roland TR-909 drum machine
- David Frank – Oberheim OB-8 synthesizers, Minimoog bass, Oberheim DMX
- Daryl Stuermer – guitar
- The Phenix Horns
  - Don Myrick – saxophone
  - Louis Satterfield – trombone
  - Michael Harris – trumpet
  - Rahmlee Michael Davis – trumpet
- Arranged by Tom Tom 84

== Charts ==
=== Weekly charts ===
Chart (1985)	Peak position
Australia (Kent Music Report)	8
Belgium (Ultratop 50 Flanders)	6
Canada Retail Singles (The Record)	1
Canada Top Singles (RPM)	10
El Salvador (UPI)	3
Europe (European Hot 100 Singles)	4
Finland (Suomen virallinen lista)	13
Ireland (IRMA)	14
Netherlands (Dutch Top 40)	3
Netherlands (Single Top 100)	12
New Zealand (Recorded Music NZ)	27
Nicaragua (UPI)	6
Norway (VG-lista)	6
Panama (UPI)	1
Peru (UPI)	1
Spain (AFYVE)	8
Sweden (Sverigetopplistan)	13
Switzerland (Schweizer Hitparade)	9
UK Singles (Official Charts)	12
UK Airplay (Music & Media)	2
Uruguay (UPI)	7
US Billboard Hot 100	1
US Adult Contemporary (Billboard)	30
US Dance Club Songs (Billboard)	4
US Hot R&B/Hip-Hop Songs (Billboard)	8
US Mainstream Rock Airplay (Billboard)	10
Venezuela (UPI)	4
West Germany (GfK)	17

=== Year-end charts ===
Chart (1985)	Position
Australia (Kent Music Report)	60
Belgium (Ultratop 50 Flanders)	47
Canada Top Singles (RPM)	97
Netherlands (Dutch Top 40)	27
Netherlands (Single Top 100)	63
US Billboard Hot 100	45

== Certifications ==
Region	Certification	Certified units/sales
New Zealand (RMNZ)	Gold	15,000^{‡}
United Kingdom (BPI)	Gold	400,000^{‡}
United States (RIAA)	Gold	500,000^{^}
^{^} Shipments figures based on certification alone.^{‡} Sales+streaming figures based on certification alone.

== Release history ==
Region	Date	Format(s)	Label(s)	Ref.
United Kingdom	14 January 1985	7-inch vinyl	Virgin	
United States	30 April 1985	7-inch vinyl; 12-inch vinyl	Atlantic	
