= Don't Lose My Number =

Single by Phil Collins

from the album No Jacket Required
- B-side: "We Said Hello Goodbye"
- Released: 1 July 1985
- Genre: Dance-rock
- Length: 4:48
- Label: Atlantic
- Songwriter: Phil Collins
- Producers: Phil Collins; Hugh Padgham

Phil Collins singles chronology
| "One More Night" (1985) | "Don't Lose My Number" (1985) | "Take Me Home" (1985) |

Music video
- "Don't Lose My Number" on YouTube

"Don't Lose My Number" is a song by the English singer Phil Collins from his third solo studio album No Jacket Required. The single was not released in the UK, though it peaked at No. 4 in the US in September 1985. The B-side, "We Said Hello Goodbye" was released as a bonus track on the CD for No Jacket Required. In Australia, the single was released with the title "(Billy) Don't Lose My Number".

== History ==
Collins has stated that the lyrics to "Don't Lose My Number" were improvised, and that he himself does not fully understand what they mean. Stephen Holden of The New York Times also agreed that the lyrics were very "vague, sketching the outlines of a melodrama but withholding the full story". The song prominently features Collins' signature gated reverb drum sound.

== Critical reception ==
Cashbox said that the song "merges a Motown drive with the singer/songwriter’s own charm and vocal urgency." Billboard said that it was a "slightly mysterious DOR tune."

== Music video ==
Collins did not know what to use as a theme for the song's music video, so he decided that it would show his decision process in selecting a theme for it. In the video, Collins talks to various "directors", who all give him ill-fitting ideas for the video. Their suggestions allow Collins to parody several other music videos of the time, including videos by David Lee Roth ("California Girls"), Elton John ("I'm Still Standing"), The Police ("Every Breath You Take"), and The Cars ("You Might Think"). Spoofs of samurai movies, Westerns, and Mad Max 2 are also included. His wife at the time, Jill Tavelman, makes a cameo in the beach scene as the model who smiles at him.

== Track listing ==
7": Atlantic / 7-89536 (US)

1. "Don't Lose My Number" (4:46)
2. "We Said Hello Goodbye" (4:15)

7": WEA / 7-259001 (Australia)

1. "(Billy) Don't Lose My Number" (4:46)
2. "We Said Hello Goodbye" (4:15)

12": Atlantic / 0-86863 (US)

1. "Don't Lose My Number" (Extended Mix) (6:36)
2. "Don't Lose My Number" (LP Version) (4:46)
3. "We Said Hello Goodbye" (4:15)

12": WEA / 0-259001 (Australia)

1. "(Billy) Don't Lose My Number" (Extended Mix) (6:36)
2. "We Said Hello Goodbye" (4:15)

CD: WEA International / WPCR 2063 (Japan)

1. "Don't Lose My Number (Edit)" (4:11)
2. "We Said Hello Goodbye" (4:15)

== Personnel ==
- Phil Collins – vocals, keyboards, drums, LinnDrum
- David Frank – additional keyboards
- Daryl Stuermer – guitars
- Leland Sklar – bass guitar

== Charts ==
=== Weekly charts ===
| Chart (1985) | Peak position |
|---|---|
| Australia (Kent Music Report) | 10 |
| Belgium (Ultratop 50 Flanders) | 22 |
| Canada Top Singles (RPM) | 11 |
| Canada Adult Contemporary (RPM) | 22 |
| Netherlands (Dutch Top 40 Tipparade) | 10 |
| Netherlands (Single Top 100) | 44 |
| New Zealand (Recorded Music NZ) | 22 |
| Panama (UPI) | 1 |
| US Billboard Hot 100 | 4 |
| US Adult Contemporary (Billboard) | 25 |
| US Mainstream Rock (Billboard) | 33 |

=== Year-end charts ===
| Year-end chart (1985) | Rank |
|---|---|
| Australia (Kent Music Report) | 87 |
| US Top Pop Singles (Billboard) | 64 |

== See also ==
- 1985 in music
