= Bridge to Terabithia (soundtrack) =

Soundtrack album by Aaron Zigman
- Released: February 13, 2007
- Recorded: 2006–2007
- Genre: Pop; rock; orchestral; classical
- Length: 47:33
- Label: Hollywood
- Producer: Aaron Zigman

Aaron Zigman chronology
Flicka (2006)	Bridge to Terabithia (2007)	Pride (2006)

Singles from Bridge to Terabithia
- 1. "Keep Your Mind Wide Open" Released: February 13, 2007

Music from and Inspired by Bridge to Terabithia is the accompanying soundtrack to the 2007 fantasy drama film Bridge to Terabithia, directed by Gábor Csupó, based on the 1977 novel of the same name by Katherine Paterson. The film's musical score was initially set to be composed by country singer-musician Alison Krauss, but left the project in July 2006 and Aaron Zigman was hired to score for the film. Zigman composed the score for the film within six months. The album consists of multiple pop and rock singles, performed by various artists including Miley Cyrus, Hayden Panettiere, Jon McLaughlin, Tyler James, Leigh Nash, AnnaSophia Robb amongst several others. The album was released by Hollywood Records on February 13, 2007.

== Background ==
In July 2006, Aaron Zigman was roped in to score for the film, after Alison Krauss, who was initially set to compose for the film, dropped out of the project. Zigman mentioned that there are similarities between the music he composed for Bridge to Terabithia and his previous film Flicka (2006), in which "...at times there's a bit of a Celtic influence but not much", but he also went on to say that there was a more modern feel to the music he composed for the film. Zigman had implemented John Williams' musical style on producing tunes for the score, He did so as Csupó requested him to not compose "a typical Hollywood score"; and then mixed up orchestral melody with "a bit of a modern flavor."

The score he composed for the film is described as "very large" compared to his other work, and Zigman commented that "Aside from the minimalist stuff and coloring that I love to do, I also like big orchestral stuff, and want to do more of that, and this film enabled me to spread my wings out a bit." He also wrote stretched musical cues for the action set pieces, while some of the musical cues ranged from "minimalist music" to "lush and very acrobatic". The soundtrack album to the film only featured four tracks from the original score, running for 15 minutes. A separate score album was released by Hollywood Records, in December 2007.

== Songs ==
Incorporated songs in the film were packaged into the film's soundtrack, which includes a version of "I Learned from You" from the Hannah Montana soundtrack, originally performed by Miley Cyrus and her father Billy Ray Cyrus, and written by Matthew Gerrard and Steve Diamond. The film version featured only Miley's vocals and new lyrics written by Gerrard and Diamond. Some of the compilation songs in the soundtrack, such as "Look Through My Eyes", "Right Here" and "When You Love Someone" were not featured in the film. "Look Through My Eyes" was originally produced by Phil Collins for the soundtrack of the film Brother Bear (2003). In 2006, Everlife recorded their rendition of the song for the compilation album Disneymania 4, that was featured in the film's soundtrack. "Right Here" is performed by Jeremy Camp from his studio album Stay (2002), and "When You Love Someone" is performed by Bethany Dillon from the album So Far: The Acoustic Sessions, released in 2008.

Other songs that are not included in the soundtrack, but featured in the film, include Five Stairsteps' "O-o-h Child", Steve Earle's "Someday" and War's "Why Can't We Be Friends?", performed by Zooey Deschanel and the cast of school children in the film. Mandy Moore's "Top of the World" is heard in the film, but not included on the soundtrack. Besides featuring as Leslie Burke, AnnaSophia Robb also sang "Keep Your Mind Wide Open" which was featured in the closing credits. She was initially hesitant to sing the track, as she had never sung professionally before, but yet agreed to do, noting that "the tune kinda took on a life of its own". Upon its release, it reached number 90 on the Billboard Hot 100 chart in March 2007.

A theme song was selected for the Japanese language version of the film: Misia's song "To Be in Love".

== Track listing ==
Music from and Inspired by Bridge to Terabithia
No.	Title	Writer(s)	Performer(s)	Length
1.	"I Learned from You"	Matthew Gerrard; Steve Diamond	Miley Cyrus	3:24
2.	"Try"	Gerrard; Robbie Nevil; Mike Krompass	Hayden Panettiere	3:19
3.	"Keep Your Mind Wide Open"	Dave Bassett; Michelle Featherstone	AnnaSophia Robb	3:36
4.	"A Place for Us"	Bryan Adams; Eliot Kennedy; Aaron Zigman	Leigh Nash; Tyler James	4:01
5.	"Another Layer"	Adams; Kennedy; Zigman	Jon McLaughlin	3:30
6.	"Shine"	Rob Bonfiglio	The Skies of America	3:52
7.	"Look Through My Eyes"	Phil Collins	Everlife	3:11
8.	"Right Here"	Jeremy Camp	Camp	4:13
9.	"When You Love Someone"	Bethany Dillon; Ed Cash	Dillon	3:30
10.	"Seeing Terabithia"	Zigman	Zigman	1:07
11.	"Into the Forest"	Zigman	Zigman	5:59
12.	"The Battle"	Zigman	Zigman	6:12
13.	"Jesse's Bridge"	Zigman	Zigman	1:34
Total length:				47:33

== Reception ==
The album was positively received by critics, with Heather Phares of AllMusic called the songs as "sweet, earnest, acoustic guitar-driven songs that fit in well with the film's themes of friendship, inspiration, and imagination" and Zigman's score as "pleasant and appropriately magical-sounding". She concluded, "Bridge to Terabithia is an uplifting soundtrack; even if, ironically enough, it feels a little lacking in imagination at times, it should please fans of the movie." Music critic Jonathan Broxton wrote "When it comes down to it, Bridge to Terabithia is a wonderfully imaginative and enjoyable piece of orchestral escapism, which adheres to every “fantasy” movie music cliché, but nevertheless remains captivating from start to finish due to Aaron Zigman’s obvious love of the project." IGN's Todd Gilchrist and Christopher Monfette had opined "The soundtrack - while not singularly impressive - sweeps eloquently from speaker to speaker", while The Hollywood Reporter praised Zigman's musical score.

== Personnel ==
Credits adapted from Allmusic

Production

- Composer and conductor – Aaron Zigman
- Producer – Kaylin Frank, Lindsay Fellows, Mitchell Leib
- Recording – Dennis Sands, Michael Stern, Ben Dobie, Noah Snyder
- Mixing – Dennis Sands, Michael Stern, Vic Florencia, Brian Paturalski, Joel Soyffer
- Mastering – Patricia Sullivan
- Music supervision – George Acogny

Instrumentation

- Bass – Ann Atkinson, Bruce Morgenthaler, David Parmeter, Drew Dembowski, Frances Wu, Michael Valerio, Nico Abondolo, Edward Meares
- Bassoon – Allen Savedoff, Judith Farmer, Kenneth Munday
- Cello – Andrew Shulman, Antony Cooke, Armen Ksajikian, Cecelia Tsan, Christina Soule, Dane Little, David Speltz, Dennis Karmazyn, Erika Duke-Kirkpatrick, George Kim Scholes, Paula Hochhalter, Steve Erdody
- Clarinet – Daniel Higgins, James Kanter
- Flute – Geraldine Rotella, Heather Clark, James Walker
- Guitar – George Doering
- Harp – Jo Ann Turovsky
- Horn – Brad Warnaar, Daniel Kelley, David Duke, Mark Adams, Paul Klintworth, Phillip Yao, Steven Becknell, Brian O'Connor
- Oboe – Leanne Becknell, Leslie Reed, Phillip Ayling
- Percussion – Alan Estes, Brian Kilgore, Daniel Greco, Donald Williams, Gregory Goodall, Peter Limonick, Robert Zimmitti
- Trombone – William Reichenbach, Phillip Teele, Steven Holtman, Charles Loper
- Trumpet – Jon Lewis, Larry Hall, Timothy Morrison, Malcolm Mc Nab
- Tuba – Doug Tornquist
- Viola – Cassandra Richburg, Darrin Mc Cann, David Walther, Keith Greene, Marlow Fisher, Matthew Funes, Rick Gerding, Roland Kato, Shanti Randall, Shawn Mann, Steven Gordon, Thomas Diener, Victoria Miskolczy, Brian Dembow
- Violin – Aimee Kreston, Alan Grunfeld, Alyssa Park, Anatoly Rosinsky, Armen Anassian, Bruce Dukov, Chang Qu, Daniel Lewin, Eric Hosler, Eun-Mee Ahn, Helen Nightengale, Henry Gronnier, Irina Voloshina, Jacqueline Brand, Jay Rosen, Josefina Vergara, Katia Popov, Kenneth Yerke, Kevin Connolly, Lorand Lokuszta, Marc Sazer, Miwako Watanabe, Natalie Leggett, Phillip Levy, Rafael Rishik, Richard Altenbach, Roberto Cani, Sarah Thornblade, Susan Rishik, Tereza Stanislav, Julie Gigante

Orchestra

- Orchestra – Hollywood Studio Symphony
- Orchestration – Aaron Zigman, Brad Warnaar, Jerry Hey
- Concertmaster – Roger Wilkie

Management

- Music clearances and business affairs – Christine Bergren
- Director of soundtracks – Desirée Craig-Ramos
- Executive in charge of music – Mitchell Leib, Lindsay Fellows
- Packaging and design – Art Slave
- Executive producer – Gabor Csupo
