= Why Can't It Wait 'Til Morning =

Single by Phil Collins

from the album Hello, I Must Be Going!
- B-side: "Like China"
- Released: 20 May 1983
- Recorded: 1982
- Genre: Soft rock
- Length: 3:01
- Label: Virgin (UK); Atlantic (International)
- Songwriter: Phil Collins
- Producers: Phil Collins; Hugh Padgham

Phil Collins singles chronology
"Don't Let Him Steal Your Heart Away" (1983)	"Why Can't It Wait 'Til Morning" (1983)	"Against All Odds" (1984)

Audio
- "Phil Collins – Why Can't It Wait Till Morning (2016 Remaster)" on YouTube

"Why Can't It Wait 'Til Morning" is a song by Phil Collins from his second solo album Hello, I Must Be Going!. The song was the fourth UK single released from the album and was only released in the UK and Ireland. According to Collins, the song has its origins from sessions for Face Value around 1978–1979.

In 1994, jazz group Fourplay recorded a cover featuring Collins and released it on their album Elixir. They also later remixed the song.

== Track listing ==
=== 7": Virgin / VS 603 (UK) ===
1. "Why Can't It Wait 'Til Morning"
2. "Like China"

== Personnel ==
- Phil Collins – vocals, piano
- Martyn Ford – orchestral arrangements and conductor
- Gavyn Wright – orchestra leader
- The Mountain Fjord Orchestra – strings and woodwinds

== Charts ==
Chart (1983)	Peak position
UK Singles (OCC)	89
