= Hello, I Must Be Going! (album) =

Studio album by Phil Collins
- Released: 5 November 1982
- Recorded: May–June 1982
- Studios: Old Croft (Shalford, Surrey); Fisher Lane Farm (Chiddingfold, Surrey); The Town House (Goldhawk Road, London); CBS Studios (London)
- Genres: Pop rock; art rock
- Length: 45:10
- Labels: Virgin, Atlantic
- Producers: Phil Collins; Hugh Padgham

Phil Collins chronology
Face Value (1981)	Hello, I Must Be Going! (1982)	No Jacket Required (1985)

Singles from Hello, I Must Be Going!
- 1. "Thru These Walls" Released: October 1982 (UK); 2. "You Can't Hurry Love" Released: October 1982 (US); 3. "I Don't Care Anymore" Released: February 1983 (US); 4. "Don't Let Him Steal Your Heart Away" Released: March 1983 (UK); 5. "I Cannot Believe It's True" Released: April 1983 (US); 6. "Why Can't It Wait 'Til Morning" Released: May 1983 (UK); 7. "It Don't Matter to Me" Released: July 1983 (Netherlands)

Hello, I Must Be Going! is the second studio album by the English drummer and singer-songwriter Phil Collins. It was released on 5 November 1982 on Virgin Records in the United Kingdom and on Atlantic Records in North America, and named after the Marx Brothers' song of the same name. After Genesis took a break in activity in late 1981, Collins started work on a follow-up to his debut solo studio album Face Value (1981).

Hello, I Must Be Going! received a more reserved commercial reaction than Face Value, but it nonetheless reached No. 2 in the United Kingdom and No. 8 in the United States. In total, Collins released eight singles from the album, with various tracks released as singles in different countries. The most successful was the first US and second UK single, a cover of "You Can't Hurry Love" by the Supremes, which went to No. 1 in the United Kingdom and No. 10 in the United States. Collins supported the album with his 1982–1983 tour, which was his first as a solo artist. The album earned Collins a Brit Award nomination for British Male Artist in 1983, and "I Don't Care Anymore" was nominated for a Grammy Award for Best Rock Vocal Performance, Male.

== Background and recording ==
In December 1981, Collins's band Genesis entered an eight-month break in activity after touring their eleventh studio album Abacab (1981). He started work on a follow-up to his first solo studio album, Face Value (1981), which mainly concerned events in his personal life including his divorce from his first wife. Collins was aware that Hello, I Must Be Going! contains even greater amounts of material concerning his private life, and reasoned its concentration down to feeling guilty regarding the divorce and "to be purely sentimental about it". He described the album years later: "If my first album was 'I'm divorced and I'm miserable' ... my next one was 'I'm going to kick this fucker to bits'". However, upon meeting his second wife Jill Tavelman and releasing Hello, I Must Be Going!, Collins noted a change in his songwriting: "[I'm] happier [...] I write happy songs now".

The album features elements of groove pop that Collins would utilise further with his next solo studio album, No Jacket Required (1985). "I Cannot Believe It's True" has been compared to "I Missed Again" from Face Value (1981) "right down to the undulating rhythms and swaying brass". Collins confessed to "a distinct lack of judgement" in recording the drums for "Thru These Walls" as the drum fill he used matched what he had done for "In the Air Tonight" from Face Value (1981). To him, that is the sole comparison between the two albums, despite being called out for rehashing similar material for Hello, I Must Be Going! In addition to this, according to Collins, "Don't Let Him Steal Your Heart Away" and "Why Can't It Wait 'Til Morning" were leftovers from the Face Value sessions in 1978–79.

=== Artwork ===
The album's sleeve contains various photographs from Collins's family life, which he had also done for Face Value (1981). He also continued the visual style of Face Value with a facial close-up as the cover image – this time showing Collins' face in profile, with its mirror image on the reverse cover (the original CD release of the album placed this on the insert card instead). The handwritten notes were also a feature carried over from Face Value. Collins wanted both albums to be a "matching set, something that felt like it was from the same bloke". Included is a picture of his young son Simon in a Superman costume, which Collins found humorous to include but later found that some people misinterpreted it as focusing the album too much on his personal life.

== Critical reception ==
Professional ratings
Review scores
Source	Rating
AllMusic	4/5 stars
Encyclopedia of Popular Music	4/5 stars
Mojo	4/5 stars
PopMatters	7/10
Q	3/5 stars
Record Collector	3/5 stars
Rolling Stone	3/5 stars
The Rolling Stone Album Guide	2.5/5 stars
Sounds	5/5 stars
Uncut	8/10

Hugh Fielder of Sounds praised Hello, I Must Be Going! as "a broader, stronger and better executed follow-up to Face Value", writing, "The original inspiration may be second-hand but the execution and character is entirely his." In Rolling Stone, John Milward said of the record: "Despite its trend-bucking boast of an eight-track recording, the album's rich luster is of the old classical-rock school. In fact, the LP sounds like stripped-down Genesis, ornamental but not too ostentatious."

NME writer Graham K. Smith was less enthused, criticising the lyrics as excessively self-pitying and the music as steeped in "blatant textbook commercialities"; he found that the album "resoundly collapses between the two stools of 'meaningful rock' and disposable pop, wallowing in all the worst aspects of both with none of the saving graces". Simon Hills of Record Mirror claims Hello, I Must Be Going clings on desperately to old soul cliches and reworks of 'In The Air Tonight'."

Retrospectively, AllMusic critic Stephen Thomas Erlewine stated that Collins "began to inject his highly melodic pop songwriting with more soul and R&B influences" on Hello, I Must Be Going!, with mixed results: "While some of the material was successful, much of it showed that he was still coming to grips with how to incorporate R&B techniques into his style." In a later review of the album for AllMusic, Tim Sendra was more favourable, deeming it "a winning follow-up that shows Collins to be in full control of songwriting and production".

== Tour ==
Collins supported the album with a concert tour of Europe and North America between November 1982 and February 1983. He performed with a nine-piece band that included Genesis touring musicians Chester Thompson and Daryl Stuermer, and the Phenix Horns.

== Reissue ==
The album was re-released using a flat transfer done by Steve Hoffman for the Audio Fidelity label in 2011 on Gold CD. The album was also reissued as part of the Take a Look at Me Now series of Collins studio album remasters during 2016, with a new second disc of bonus songs.

== Track listing ==
All tracks are written by Phil Collins, except where noted.

Side one
No.	Title	Writer(s)	Length
1.	"I Don't Care Anymore"		5:00
2.	"I Cannot Believe It's True"		5:14
3.	"Like China"		5:05
4.	"Do You Know, Do You Care?"		4:57
5.	"You Can't Hurry Love"	Holland–Dozier–Holland	2:57

Side two
No.	Title	Length
6.	"It Don't Matter to Me"	4:12
7.	"Thru These Walls"	5:02
8.	"Don't Let Him Steal Your Heart Away"	4:43
9.	"The West Side"	4:59
10.	"Why Can't It Wait 'Til Morning"	3:01
Total length:		45:10

=== 2016 reissue ===
Hello! Extras bonus disc (Disc two of 2016 deluxe edition)
No.	Title	Writer(s)	Length
1.	"I Don't Care Anymore" (live 1985)		6:30
2.	"I Cannot Believe It's True" (live 1982)		5:29
3.	"Like China" (live 1985)		5:41
4.	"You Can't Hurry Love" (live 1985)	Holland–Dozier–Holland	3:04
5.	"It Don't Matter to Me" (live 1985)		4:23
6.	"The West Side" (live rehearsal 1996)		7:37
7.	"People Get Ready" (live 1982)	Curtis Mayfield	3:18
8.	"Thru These Walls" (live 1982)		5:03
9.	"It's Alright" (live 1985)	Mayfield	2:22
10.	"Oddball" (demo "Do You Know, Do You Care?")		4:30
11.	"Don't Let Him Steal Your Heart Away" (demo)		4:42
Total length:			52:39

== Personnel ==
Musicians

- Phil Collins – vocals, drums (1–9), keyboards (1–4, 6, 7, 9), bass pedals (1, 4, 9), percussion (2, 6, 9), handclaps (3), timpani (4), trumpet (4), tambourine (5), marimba (7), acoustic piano (8, 10)
- Daryl Stuermer – guitars (1–9)
- John Giblin – bass guitar (2, 3, 5, 8)
- Mo Foster – bass guitar (6, 7)
- J. Peter Robinson – acoustic piano, vibraphone and glockenspiel (5)
- The Phenix Horns – horns (2, 6, 9)
  - Don Myrick – alto and tenor saxophones, alto sax solo (2, 9)
  - Louis "Louie Louie" Satterfield – trombone
  - Michael Harris – trumpet
  - Rahmlee Michael Davis – trumpet
- The Phenix Choir (Phil Collins, Don Myrick, Louis Satterfield, Michael Harris, Rahmlee Michael Davis and Peter Newton) – additional vocals (2)
- The Mountain Fjord Orchestra – orchestral strings and woodwinds (5, 8, 10)
- Martyn Ford – string and woodwind arrangements and conductor
- Gavyn Wright – orchestra leader

Production and artwork

- Phil Collins – producer
- Hugh Padgham – assistant producer, engineer
- Howard Gray – assistant engineer
- Martyn Ford – engineer (for orchestral tracks)
- Mike Ross – engineer
- Ian Cooper – mastering
- Trevor Key – cover photography

== Charts ==
=== Weekly charts ===
Chart (1982–1983)	Peak position
Australian Albums (Kent Music Report)	15
Canada Top Albums/CDs (RPM)	1
Dutch Albums (Album Top 100)	3
Finland (The Official Finnish Charts)	16
German Albums (Offizielle Top 100)	6
Italian Albums (Musica e Dischi)	12
Japanese Albums (Oricon)	31
New Zealand Albums (RMNZ)	20
Norwegian Albums (VG-lista)	4
Spanish Albums (AFYVE)	3
Swedish Albums (Sverigetopplistan)	7
UK Albums (Official Charts)	2
US Billboard 200	8

Chart (2016)	Peak position
Austrian Albums (Ö3 Austria)	52
Belgian Albums (Ultratop Flanders)	103
Belgian Albums (Ultratop Wallonia)	60
French Albums (SNEP)	138
Swiss Albums (Schweizer Hitparade)	50

=== Year-end charts ===
Chart (1983)	Position
Canada Top Albums/CDs (RPM)	10
US Billboard 200	21

== Certifications ==
Sales certifications for Hello, I Must Be Going!
Region	Certification	Certified units/sales
Argentina (CAPIF)	Platinum	60,000^{^}
Austria (IFPI Austria)	Gold	25,000^{*}
Belgium (BRMA)	Platinum	50,000^{*}
France (SNEP)	2× Platinum	600,000^{*}
Germany (BVMI)	2× Platinum	1,000,000^{^}
Netherlands (NVPI)	Gold	50,000^{^}
New Zealand (RMNZ)	Gold	7,500^{‡}
Spain (Promusicae)	Platinum	100,000^{^}
Switzerland (IFPI Switzerland)	Platinum	50,000^{^}
United Kingdom (BPI)	3× Platinum	900,000^{^}
United States (RIAA)	3× Platinum	3,000,000^{^}
^{*} Sales figures based on certification alone.^{^} Shipments figures based on certification alone.^{‡} Sales+streaming figures based on certification alone.
