= I Don't Care Anymore =

1983 single by Phil Collins

Single by Phil Collins

from the album Hello, I Must Be Going!
- B-side: "The West Side"
- Released: February 1983
- Recorded: 1982
- Genre: Rock
- Length: 5:03 (album version); 4:45 (7" single edit)
- Label: Virgin (UK); Atlantic (international)
- Songwriter: Phil Collins
- Producers: Phil Collins; Hugh Padgham

Phil Collins singles chronology
"You Can't Hurry Love" (1982)	"I Don't Care Anymore" (1983)	"Don't Let Him Steal Your Heart Away" (1983)

Music video
- "I Don't Care Anymore" on YouTube

"I Don't Care Anymore" is a song written, performed, and produced by the English drummer Phil Collins (with co-production by Hugh Padgham). It was the second US single from Collins' second solo studio album, Hello, I Must Be Going! (1982). It became a moderate US hit, peaking at number 39 on the Billboard Hot 100. The single did not see a UK release; however, it was released as the third single in various other countries such as Germany and Australia.

This song is considered 'dark' in tone, and is comparable to Collins' earlier hit single "In the Air Tonight", as both contain powerful drum kit along with simplistic synthesizers and guitar riffs, coupled with angry lyrics directed at Collins' failed first marriage. The drums also illustrate the gated reverb recording technique that defined Collins' sound throughout the 1980s. During "I Don't Care Anymore", the drum track switches several times between "standard" studio sound and a gated reverb overlay. Cashbox noted that with the song's "sparse synthesizer and guitar arrangements" the drumming provides most of the emotional expression. Billboard said that "Collins combines R&B inclinations with his Genesis for a moody, brooding cry of rebellion."

The song earned Collins his first Grammy Award nomination for Best Male Rock Vocal Performance in 1984, which was won by Michael Jackson for "Beat It".

== Music video ==
In addition to Chester Thompson, touring band members Daryl Stuermer (guitar), Peter Robinson (keyboards), and Mo Foster (bass) also appear. Aside from Stuermer, the rest of the band does not appear on the actual recording and are instead miming Collins's parts.

The video is staged entirely in a dark room, with spotlights appearing over each band member as they begin to play. Foster is clearly visible in Robinson's spotlight for about a minute before he begins to play, hands in pockets, shuffling his feet occasionally, and looking more like a loiterer than a band member. When he begins to play (at the beginning of the first chorus), he plays the song's synthesised bassline on Moog Taurus bass pedals. Instead of playing them with his feet as intended by the manufacturer, he strikes them somewhat dramatically with the sides of his closed fists. He plays considerably more notes than what is actually heard, and frequently manipulates the Taurus's filter controls with one hand while striking with the other.

Live concert footage from the same year shows that Foster did, in fact, play the Taurus with his hands (whereas future touring bassist Leland Sklar played the Taurus with his feet while simultaneously playing bass guitar). He did not strike the pedals with his fist, however, instead simply depressing each pedal with the flat of his hand. He did frequently manipulate the Taurus's filters to great effect, but the bassline he performed was the simplified version heard on the recording rather than the overzealous part he mimed in the video.

== Track listing ==
=== 7": Atlantic 7-89877 (US) ===
1. "I Don't Care Anymore"
2. "The West Side"

=== 7": WEA 25.9938-7 (Holland) ===
1. "I Don't Care Anymore"
2. "Don't Let Him Steal Your Heart Away"

=== 12": WEA 25-9935 (Holland) ===
1. "I Don't Care Anymore"
2. "Don't Let Him Steal Your Heart Away"
3. "And So to F" (Live) (6:34)

== Charts ==
Chart (1983)	Peak position
US Billboard Hot 100	39
US Billboard Top Rock Tracks	3

== Personnel ==
- Phil Collins – vocals, keyboards, bass pedals, drums, tambourine
- Daryl Stuermer – guitars

== Hellyeah version ==
"I Don't Care Anymore"

Single by Hellyeah

from the album Undeniable
- Released: July 27, 2016
- Genre: Groove metal
- Length: 4:42
- Label: Eleven Seven
- Songwriter: Phil Collins
- Producer: Kevin Churko

Hellyeah singles chronology
"Human" (2016)	"I Don't Care Anymore" (2016)	"Love Falls" (2017)

American heavy metal supergroup Hellyeah released a cover version of I Don't Care Anymore as a single on July 27, 2016 off their fifth studio album Undeniable. The cover features a lost performance by Dimebag Darrell which was unearthed by his older brother, Hellyeah drummer Vinnie Paul. According to Paul, Damageplan's cover of the song never saw the light of day and it took him three weeks to find the recordings. The lost recordings would eventually be converted with Pro Tools with the help of producer Kevin Churko. Chad Gray called recording the vocal sessions a very emotional moment while mentioning that having the band track Dimebag Darrell's riffs was one of the most magical moments in Gray's career. A music video for the rendition was released to Eleven Seven's YouTube channel a day after the single was released with the video being directed by William "Wombat Fire" Felch. In an interview with Billboard, Chad Gray stated that he hopes that Phil Collins loves the band's cover of the track.

=== Charts ===
Chart (2016)	Peak position
U.S. Billboard Mainstream Rock	10
U.S. Billboard Rock Airplay	32

== Other cover versions ==
- From Zero covered the song on their second and final studio album My So-Called Life (2003).
- Tweaker covered the song on their third studio album Call the Time Eternity (2012).
- Saint Asonia covered the song in 2016 as a non-album single.
