= Devastate (song) =

Single by Saint Asonia

from the album Introvert/Extrovert
- Released: February 7, 2023
- Genre: Alternative metal
- Length: 3:32
- Label: Spinefarm
- Songwriters: Adam Gontier; Keith Wallen; Anton DeLost
- Producer: Anton DeLost

Saint Asonia singles chronology
"Wolf" (2022)	"Devastate" (2023)

Music video
- "Devastate" on YouTube

"Devastate" is a song by Canadian-American rock supergroup Saint Asonia. It was released on February 7, 2023, as the third single from their compilation album, Introvert/Extrovert. The song was also included on their Extrovert EP.

== Background ==
"Devastate" is a song about, "addiction and the devastation both alcohol and drugs can bring someone and their loved ones." Lead vocalist Adam Gontier wrote the track about the people in his life who "leave a trail of destruction behind them." He added, "I feel like we've all got, or had, someone in our lives that was just evil. Not caring about anything but themselves, and turning everything they touch into darkness."

== Composition ==
"Devastate" was written by Adam Gontier and Keith Wallen whilst production was handled by Anton DeLost who also co-wrote the song. Described as one of the band's heaviest tracks to date, the song is a fast and thrash heavy track, with hooky riffs and a blistering breakdown.

== Music video ==
The music video for "Devastate" premiered via YouTube on March 16, 2023. The music video was directed by Justin Reich.

== Track listing ==
Digital download
No.	Title	Length
1.	"Devastate" (acoustic)	3:27
2.	"Above It All" (acoustic)	3:20

== Credits and personnel ==
Saint Asonia

- Adam Gontier – lead vocals
- Cale Gontier – bass guitar
- Mike Mushok – guitar
- Cody Watkins – drums

Production

- Anton DeLost – mixing, producer, recording engineer
- Ted Jensen – mastering engineer

== Charts ==
Chart performance for "Devastate"
Chart (2023)	Peak position
Canada Rock (Billboard)	35
US Mainstream Rock (Billboard)	22

== Release history ==
Release history and formats for "Devastate"
Region	Date	Format	Label	Ref.
United States	February 7, 2023	Active rock	Spinefarm	
Various	June 29, 2023	Digital download; streaming	Spinefarm	
