= I Cannot Believe It's True =

Single by Phil Collins

from the album Hello, I Must Be Going!
- B-side: "Thru These Walls"
- Released: April 1983 (US)
- Recorded: 1982
- Genre: Pop rock
- Length: 5:14
- Label: Atlantic (International)
- Songwriter: Phil Collins
- Producers: Phil Collins; Hugh Padgham

Phil Collins singles chronology
"Don't Let Him Steal Your Heart Away" (1983)	"I Cannot Believe It's True" (1983)	"Why Can't It Wait 'Til Morning" (1983)

Audio
- "Phil Collins - I Cannot Believe It's True (2016 Remaster)" on YouTube

"I Cannot Believe It's True" is a song by Phil Collins from his second solo album Hello, I Must Be Going!. It was the third US single released from the album and was only released in the US and Canada; internationally it had instead been released as the B-side of "You Can't Hurry Love".

Cash Box noted the "cowbell-like" percussion and "Collins' profound pop tunesmithing."

The song found moderate success on the Billboard Hot 100, reaching #79.

== Track listing ==
=== U.S. 7" single (Atlantic) ===
1. "I Cannot Believe It's True"
2. "Thru These Walls"

=== U.S. 12" promo single (Atlantic) ===
1. "I Cannot Believe It's True"
2. "I Cannot Believe It's True" (live on 19 December 1982 in Pasadena, California at Perkins Palace)

== Charts ==
Chart (1983)	Peak position
U.S. Billboard Hot 100	79

== Credits ==
- Phil Collins – keyboards, drums, vocals, percussion
- Daryl Stuermer – guitars
- John Giblin – bass
- Don Myrick – alto sax solo
- Don Myrick, Louis "Louie Louie" Satterfield, Rhamlee Michael Davis and Michael Harris – Phenix Horns
- Don Myrick, Louis "Louie Louie" Satterfield, Rhamlee Michael Davis, Phil Collins and Peter Newton – Phenix Choir

=== Live version ===
- Phil Collins – vocals, Rhodes piano
- J. Peter Robinson – keyboards, vocoder
- Daryl Stuermer – guitar
- Mo Foster – bass
- Chester Thompson – drums
- Don Myrick – alto sax solo
- Don Myrick, Louis "Louie Louie" Satterfield, Rhamlee Michael Davis and Michael Harris – Phenix Horns
