= Samantha Parkington =

American Girl book character and doll line

- American Girl character
- Artwork of Samantha Parkington as illustrated by Dan Andreasen.
- First appearance: Meet Samantha (1986)
- Created by: American Girl, Susan S. Adler, Valerie Tripp
- Portrayed by: AnnaSophia Robb

In-universe information
- Full name: Samantha Mary Parkington
- Nickname: Sam
- Family: Mr. Parkington (father); Lydia Parkington (mother); Cornelia Edwards (maternal aunt/adoptive mother); Gardner Edwards (maternal uncle/adoptive father); Nellie O'Malley (adoptive younger sister); Bridget O'Malley (adoptive younger sister); Jenny O'Malley (adoptive younger sister); William Samuel Edwards (adoptive younger brother); Raquel Reyes (great-great granddaughter)
- Home: New York City, New York; Mount Bedford, New York

Samantha Parkington is a fictional character from the American Girl historical book series and doll line, introduced in 1986 by Pleasant Company. Samantha’s story is set in 1904, during the Edwardian Period/Progressive Era, and is characterized by significant social change, class divides, and the beginning of the suffrage movement.

== Concept and design ==
Samantha was created by Pleasant Rowland, an American educator, reporter, writer, entrepreneur, and philanthropist. Samantha's stories have been primarily written by Susan S. Adler, Valerie Tripp, and Masine Rose Schur. In a 2026 CBS Sunday Morning interview with Jamie Cygielman, Tripp describes how Rowland conceived the idea of the three original dolls, Samantha, Molly, and Kirsten, on a business trip to Colonial Williamsburg, and her thinking about how she could make history come alive for children, like the way Colonial Williamsburg comes alive. Rowland worked closely with Tripp, sending her a postcard with ideas of stories about girls for girls.

Samantha's design represented the "turn of the century" in America. Her fictional hometown, Mount Bedford, is based on the real-life town of Mount Kisco, in Westchester County, New York; the mansion Samantha and her family resided in was also heavily based on the Theodore Carpenter House in Mount Kisco.

=== Doll ===
Along with the stories, a doll was created by The Pleasant Company in 1986. In 1998, Mattel had become the retail distributor where the dolls and stories moved under the new name American Girl.

In 2004, American Girl came out with the Best Friend Characters that were companions to the main Historical Dolls. Samantha's best friend in the books was an Irish-American girl named Nellie O'Malley, who was introduced in Meet Samantha. She was a scullery maid who lived next door to Samantha.

== Books ==
The original dolls followed a 6-book series:

American Girl books for Samantha and other historical girls followed a 6-book format, which consisted of Meet [Character's Name]; [Character's Name] Learns a Lesson; [Character's Name] Surprise; Happy Birthday [Character's Name]; [Character's Name] Saves the Day; and Changes for [Character's Name]. This format was the standard for every historical character released between 1986 and 2011. In the original format, each of the books had a "looking back" story at the end of the book to give you a deeper dive into historical topics. For Samantha's stories, these included the transition from the Victorian to the Edwardian era, the history of girls' education, and the emergence of the Progressive Era and child labor laws.

=== Original series ===
- Meet Samantha: An American Girl, Book 1
  - Summary: Set in 1904, Samantha is a wealthy orphan living with her traditional grandmother, Grandmary. The story establishes the class divide of the Edwardian era when Samantha befriends Nellie O'Malley, a young servant girl. Samantha's empathy is tested as she realizes the vast difference between her world of privilege and Nellie's life of labor.
- Samantha Learns a Lesson: A School Story, Book 2
  - Summary: Samantha attends Miss Crampton's Academy, where she struggles with the rigid expectations of "proper" young ladies. When she discovers Nellie is being mocked at the local public school for being "slow" (due to working rather than studying), Samantha begins secret nighttime tutoring sessions to help Nellie win a school prize.
- Samantha's Surprise: A Christmas Story, Book 3
  - Summary: Samantha hopes for a special doll (Lydia) for Christmas but is more concerned about her Uncle Gard and his new friend, Cornelia. Fearing Cornelia will change her family dynamic, Samantha eventually learns about the importance of new beginnings and generosity when she sees the struggles Nellie's family faces during the holidays.
- Happy Birthday, Samantha!: A Springtime Story, Book 4
  - Summary: For her tenth birthday, Samantha visits New York City with Grandmary. While the trip is meant to be a celebration of high society, Samantha is confronted with the reality of child labor and the "street urchins" of the city. This book marks a turning point where Samantha begins to question the social structures of the 20th century.
- Samantha Saves the Day: A Summer Story, Book 5
  - Summary: During a summer at Goose Lake, Samantha and her friends attempt to row to an island to find a "secret" spot. A sudden dangerous storm strands them, forcing Samantha to use her wits and courage to keep everyone safe. The story explores themes of independence and the transition from childhood play to real-world responsibility.
- Changes for Samantha: A Winter Story, Book 6
  - Summary: Nellie and her sisters are orphaned and sent to a cruel, Dickensian orphanage. Samantha discovers their plight and orchestrates a daring rescue, eventually persuading Uncle Gard and Cornelia to adopt the girls. This book resolves the class conflict established in Book 1 by merging the two families.

=== BeForever books ===
Since 1986, the Meet [Character's Name] books have been accompanying the dolls as an introduction to the character. In 2014, American Girl relaunched the historical story lines for each of the historical characters, including Samantha. This line was called BeForever, which condensed the six stories to two books with modern illustrations to appeal to newer generations. In 2019, another change transitions the historical stories into abridged two-volume editions and introduced "character journals". In addition, an interactive, "choose-your-own-ending" was released, titled The Lilac Tunnel: My Journey with Samantha by Erin Falligant.

==== Titles ====
- Manners and Mischief: A Samantha Classic Volume 1
- Lost and Found: A Samantha Classic Volume 2
- Samantha: The Gift
- Samantha: Lost and Found

=== Short stories ===
- "Samantha and the Missing Pearls"
- "Samantha's Special Talent"
- "Samantha's Winter Party"
- "Samantha Saves the Wedding"
- "Samantha's Blue Bicycle"

=== Mysteries ===
- The Curse of Ravenscourt
- The Stolen Sapphire
- The Cry of the Loon
- Clue in the Castle Tower
- Danger in Paris

== Media and cultural popularity ==
In 2004, Parkington's character led to the brand's first film, Samantha: An American Girl Holiday, starring AnnaSophia Robb as the title character.

After being "archived" (retired) in 2008, public demand remained so high that she was re-released in 2014 as part of the BeForever line with a redesigned outfit and collection. By her 40th anniversary, Samantha had transitioned from a toy to a symbol of "nostalgia marketing" for millennial parents who grew up with her (D'Amico 2017).

=== 40th anniversary of American Girl ===
For American Girl's 40th anniversary in 2026, the brand released Raquel Reyes, the great-great-granddaughter of Samantha Parkington. Raquel was one of the first dolls to connect modern girls with the brand's historical characters, and focused specifically on Latina identity and heritage.

The brand also released a novel following an adult Samantha, aimed at an adult audience, titled Samantha: The Next Chapter, written by Fiona Davis. Set in New York in 1920, Samantha is working hard to educate women in New York about suffrage and encourage them to vote in their first presidential election that fall.

== Academic responses and reception ==
Positive academic responses have frequently praised the series for its pedagogical value. Fred Nielsen (2002a) argues that the stories allow children to view history through a relatable, gendered lens, making complex social movements like the suffrage movement and child labor laws accessible. Other scholars note that the look of Samantha from her authentic Edwardian clothing, serves as a tangible connection to the past. And in contrast, are well-done in providing readers with an introduction to the early twentieth-century America and the issues of child labor, technology development (in Samantha's world that would be automobiles and factories) Women's suffrage, and class conflicts

Danielle DiMaiolo Rendini, head of retail at American Girl, told an audience at Shoptalk Fall 2025 regarding Samantha Parkington that "She is an OG,". The doll was one of the first three historical characters introduced in 1986 and quickly became a fan favorite.

Critics and scholars have also highlighted the series' limitations. Some academic critiques point to the "consumption of identity," where the high price point of the doll creates a class-based barrier to entry for many children.

The focus on Samantha's wealth has occasionally been seen as reinforcing "proper" girlhood rather than challenging it.

In a collection edited by Luella D'Amico (2018), scholars such as Marlowe Daly-Galeano and Mariko Turk argue that girls' series fiction provides a "cultural conversation" that allows readers to engage with history through "girl-sized views" as it responds to cultural changes, treating these stories as significant "cultural relics" and part of a "collective literary heritage".

According to analysis by Mariko Turk, Samantha Parkington represents a "desultory attention to injustice" because her awareness of social issues remains superficial and brief. While Samantha witnesses the "evil of poverty and child labor" through her friend Nellie, Turk argues this is merely an "isolated plot point that is ultimately abandoned in the narrative". Turk also continues to critique the brand for this lack of sustained social lens, noting that the reader is kept "ignorant of the injustice inherent in the American Girl franchise" regarding the actual labor used to produce its mass-marketed products.
