= Theodore Carpenter House =

Coordinates: 41°12′34.8″N 73°43′57.4″W

The Theodore Carpenter House, in Mount Kisco, Westchester County, New York, is a post-American Civil War home built by Theodore Carpenter, a prominent Mount Kisco official. The house was used as the main setting in the filming of the movie Ragtime.

The house also served as the inspiration for Samantha Parkington's house in the American Girl book series.
