= Let Me Live My Life =

Single by Saint Asonia

from the album Saint Asonia
- Released: July 17, 2015
- Length: 3:11
- Label: RCA
- Songwriters: Adam Gontier; Mike Mushok
- Producer: Johnny K

Saint Asonia singles chronology
"Better Place" (2015)	"Let Me Live My Life" (2015)	"The Hunted" (2019)

Lyric video
- "Let Me Live My Life" on YouTube

"Let Me Live My Life" is a song by Canadian-American rock supergroup Saint Asonia. It was released on July 17, 2015, as the second single from their debut self-titled studio album. The song was released two weeks before the album's arrival.

== Composition ==
The song runs at 177 BPM and is in the key of C♯ minor. A lyric video was released the same day the single came out. Gontier stated that "Let Me Live My Life" was his favourite song from the album. He revealed the meaning behind the song.

"'Let Me Live My Life' definitely stands out as one of my favourites. That is a song about people dragging me down and me asking them to let me go. It definitely hits home for me."

Gontier also said that it is one of his favorite songs to play live stating, "It is a lot of fun, and it has that bouncy feel to it."

== Release ==
"Let Me Live My Life" was released digitally on July 17, 2015, and had its lyrics video premiere on the same day. The song was serviced to mainstream rock radio in the United States on December 24, 2015.

== Reception ==
Chad Childers of Loudwire stated, "The track gets going Corey Lowery's bass licks before giving way to a swinging drum and guitar combination from Rich Beddoe and Mike Mushok before Adam Gontier's vocals kick in. As for the lyrical content, it's a gut punch of a song." The song has amassed over 10 million streams on Spotify.

== Credits and personnel ==
Saint Asonia

- Adam Gontier – lead vocals, rhythm guitar
- Mike Mushok – lead guitar, backing vocals
- Corey Lowery – bass
- Rich Beddoe – drums

Production

- Johnny K – producer, mixing engineer, engineer
- Bradley Cook – assistant engineer
- Matt Dougherty – assistant engineer

== Charts ==
=== Weekly charts ===
Weekly chart performance for "Let Me Live My Life"
Chart (2015)	Peak position
Canada Rock (Billboard)	23
US Mainstream Rock (Billboard)	10

=== Year-end charts ===
Year-end chart performance for "Let Me Live My Life"
Chart (2016)	Position
US Mainstream Rock Songs (Billboard)	44

== Release history ==
Release history and formats for "Let Me Live My Life"
Region	Date	Format	Label	Ref.
Various	July 17, 2015	Digital download; streaming	RCA	
United States	December 24, 2015	Mainstream rock	RCA	
