= Sleepwalking (film) =

- Theatrical release poster
- Directed by: William Maher
- Written by: Zac Stanford
- Produced by: Charlize Theron
- Starring: Nick Stahl; AnnaSophia Robb; Charlize Theron; Woody Harrelson; Dennis Hopper
- Cinematography: Juan Ruiz Anchía
- Edited by: Stuart Levy
- Music by: Christopher Young
- Production company: Dream7 Entertainment
- Distributed by: Overture Films
- Release date: January 22, 2008 (Sundance): March 14, 2008; (United States)
- Running time: 100 minutes
- Country: United States
- Language: English
- Box office: $208,995

Sleepwalking is a 2008 American drama film starring Nick Stahl, AnnaSophia Robb, Charlize Theron (who also produces the film), Woody Harrelson and Dennis Hopper. It centers on the bonding of a 30-year-old man and his 12-year-old niece after she is abandoned by her mother. The girl is taken in by the state after he loses his job and apartment. The two then depart on a road trip to his father's farm, a place he and his sister never intended to go back to. Sleepwalking was an original screenplay by Zac Stanford and was the directorial debut of William Maher.

Shooting began in October 2006 in Moose Jaw and Regina, Saskatchewan, Canada under the working title Ferris Wheel. It was filmed on a 30-day shooting schedule, often under sub-zero conditions. The film featured the song "Come On, Come Out" by A Fine Frenzy. It premiered at the Sundance Film Festival on January 22, 2008, and was given a limited release in theaters beginning on March 14, 2008.

== Plot ==
Tara Reedy and her reckless mother Joleen have been evicted from the house where they were staying with Joleen's latest boyfriend, who was arrested for growing marijuana. Tara is forced to follow Joleen as she begs her younger brother, James, to take them in.

Shortly after moving into James' apartment, Joleen runs off with a truck driver, leaving Tara with her uncle, who works with a road-building crew. After missing too many days of work, he is fired, and ends up crashing in the basement of his married best friend, Randall, after Tara has been sent to a foster home.

Longing to be reunited with Tara, James goes to visit her, and she tells him she's being bullied in the foster home and asks him to take her away. James drives Tara to his childhood home, which he and Joleen had fled from many years earlier. James and Tara agree to pose as father and daughter during the road trip, and begin to develop a familial bond. Upon arriving at the Reedy homestead, which has now become a run-down cattle and horse farm, they are immediately put to work as unpaid labor by the head of the household, Mr. Reedy.

Mr. Reedy treats Tara with contempt, physically abusing her due to her inexperience with farming. James attempts to stand up to his father, but is quickly rebuked and threatened with a shovel. After silencing his son, Mr. Reedy continues to abuse Tara, until James snaps and beats his father to death with the shovel, exacting revenge for the years of abuse he and Joleen had previously suffered. James then drives Tara to Westmoreland, where Joleen is waiting at the police station. He leaves Tara with Joleen as the police rush out to arrest him, only to find him already gone.

== Cast ==
- Nick Stahl as James Reedy
- AnnaSophia Robb as Tara Reedy
- Charlize Theron as Joleen Reedy
- Deborra-Lee Furness as Danni
- Mathew St. Patrick as Detective #1
- Callum Keith Rennie as Will
- Woody Harrelson as Randall
- Dennis Hopper as Mr. Reedy

== Production ==
To get the film funded, Charlize Theron agreed to act in the film in a small role with the condition that she also produce. Of her role as Joleen, Theron said, "I have to say that I really like the idea of playing somebody who was a flawed mother. She’s an uncomfortable character, yet to me, very real. There are women out there who are just not good mothers, and Jolene is one of them."

Sleepwalking was filmed over a 30-day schedule in Moose Jaw and Regina, Saskatchewan, Canada in October 2006.

== Release ==
The film premiered at the 2008 Sundance Film Festival. It was later given a limited theatrical release on March 14, 2008.

== Reception ==
On review aggregator website Rotten Tomatoes, the film holds 17% approval rating based on 60 reviews, with an average rating of 4.3/10. The website's critics consensus reads, "Despite some sharp performances, Sleepwalking suffers from a grimness of tone and sluggish pacing." On Metacritic, Sleepwalking holds a rank of 56 out of a 100 based on 6 critics, indicating "mixed or average reviews".

American newspaper The Christian Science Monitor praised the film, commenting that "Despite its deficiencies, and the inadequate screen time allotted to Theron (who's quite good), "Sleepwalking" has a core of feeling. It's about a do-gooder who, lacking all skills for it, does good anyway. His emotional odyssey has real poignancy," concluding to give it a final rating of "B". In a review for USA Today, Claudia Puig called the film "Portentous and dull," adding that "[the film] features one of the worst over-the-top performances by Dennis Hopper, who plays an abusive father." The New York Times gave a neutral review, noting that "Sleepwalking sustains a mood of unrelenting bleakness, wearing its aesthetic of desolation like a badge of integrity."

Reviewing the film negatively, Ann Hornaday of The Washington Post called the film "an inert, sloppily written melodrama as grim and featureless as its frozen Midwestern setting." The Chicago Tribune wrote negatively of the film, noting that "Despite honorable work from Theron, Robb, and Stahl, "Sleepwalking" makes good on its title in a not-so-good way."

== Home media ==
Sleepwalking was released on DVD by Anchor Bay Entertainment on July 8, 2008.
