= Wolf (Saint Asonia song) =

Single by Saint Asonia

from the album Introvert/Extrovert
- Released: October 21, 2022; November 10, 2023 (featuring John Cooper)
- Genre: Alternative metal
- Length: 3:18
- Label: Spinefarm
- Songwriters: Adam Gontier; Johnny Andrews
- Producer: Anton DeLost

Saint Asonia singles chronology
"Above It All" (2022)	"Wolf" (2022)	"Devastate" (2023)

Music video
- "Wolf" on YouTube

"Wolf" is a song by Canadian-American rock supergroup Saint Asonia. It was released on October 21, 2022, as the lead single from their second EP, Extrovert. The song was re-released on November 10, 2023, featuring John Cooper of Skillet.

== Background ==
"Wolf" has been described as "a battle cry and an anthem of survival" track. The song was inspired by the chaos and violence that many people in the world face and learning how to fight back to stay alive. Adam Gontier stated, "So often we have to fight, scratch, and crawl our way out of unbearably difficult times, making our way to the surface for a moment, just to be thrown back in. It kinda feels like we're always under attack."

On November 10, 2023, the band re-released "Wolf" with guest vocals from John Cooper of Skillet. Gontier called the collaboration an honor. The collaboration came together after the group spent that year touring with each other on the Rock Resurrection tour.

== Critical reception ==
"Wolf" was met with mixed reviews from music critics. Samuel Stevens of Crucial Rhythm called the song the most memorable track from the EP, praising its catchy chorus and Mike Mushok's guitar work. In contrast, Reggie Edwards of Front Row Report stated "'Wolf' isn't even the best song on the EP."

== Music video ==
The group shared an official visualizer for "Wolf" on October 27, 2022. The band premiered a live music video for the song, featuring John Cooper on January 16, 2024. The video was shot on November 22, 2023, in Salem, Virginia and was directed by Justin Reich. It was recorded during the band's run on the Rock Resurrection tour.

== Credits and personnel ==
Credits for "Wolf" adapted from AllMusic.

Saint Asonia

- Adam Gontier – lead vocals, rhythm guitar, composer, lyricist
- Mike Mushok – lead guitar
- Cale Gontier – bass guitar
- Cody Watkins – drums

Additional musicians

- John Cooper – featured artist (2023 version)

Production

- Anton DeLost – mixing, producer, recording
- Johnny Andrews – composer, lyricist
- Mike White - assisting
- Ted Jensen – mastering

== Charts ==
=== Weekly charts ===
Weekly chart performance for "Wolf"
Chart (2024)	Peak position
Canada Rock (Mediabase)	11
US Mainstream Rock (Billboard)	21

=== Year-end charts ===
Year-end chart performance for "Wolf"
Chart (2025)	Position
Canada Mainstream Rock (Billboard)	52

== Release history ==
Release history and formats for "Wolf"
Region	Date	Version	Format	Label	Ref.
Various	October 21, 2022	Original	Digital download; streaming	Spinefarm	
Various	November 10, 2023	Featuring John Cooper	Digital download; streaming	Spinefarm	
