= Flawed Design (album) =

Studio album by Saint Asonia
- Released: October 25, 2019
- Recorded: Early 2019
- Studio: Powerstation NE
- Genres: Alternative rock; nu metal
- Length: 43:32
- Label: Spinefarm
- Producer: Brian Sperber

Saint Asonia chronology
Saint Asonia (2015)	Flawed Design (2019)	Introvert/Extrovert (2022)

Singles from Flawed Design
- 1. "The Hunted" Released: July 24, 2019; 2. "Blind" Released: March 24, 2020; 3. "Ghost" Released: October 28, 2020

Flawed Design is the second studio album by Canadian-American rock supergroup Saint Asonia released on October 25, 2019, via Spinefarm Records. The album was produced by Brian Sperber and is supported by three singles: "The Hunted", "Blind" and "Ghost".

== Background ==
Flawed Design is the band's first album in four years and follows their 2015 debut studio album, Saint Asonia. The band had brought in Cale Gontier to replace bass player Corey Lowery and brought in drummer Sal Giancarelli, of Staind to replace Rich Beddoe.

For this effort, the band collaborated with other musicians including Breaking Benjamin's Keith Wallen on "Beast", Godsmack's Sully Erna on lead single "The Hunted", Within Temptation lead singer Sharon den Adel lending her voice on the second track "Sirens", and Starset singer Dustin Bates sharing his writing skills on the song "Ghost".

A deluxe edition of the album was released on December 7, 2020, which includes two bonus tracks, "Say Goodbye" and "Weak & Tired". It was released as exclusives for specific Walmart-purchased copies in the US and as standard built-in tracks for all copies in Europe. On December 13, 2019, Flawed Design was released on vinyl for purchase.

Loudwire named it one of the 50 best rock albums of 2019.

== Singles ==
The first single from the album, "The Hunted" was released on July 24, 2019. The second single, "Blind" was released on rock radio on March 24, 2020. The third and final single, "Ghost" was released on October 28, 2020.

=== Promotional singles ===
The first promotional single from the album, "Beast" was released on September 20, 2019. The final pre-release single, "This August Day", was released on October 18, 2019.

== Critical reception ==
Professional ratings
Review scores
Source	Rating
Melodic	3.5/5 stars
Sputnikmusic	3/5

Simon K of Sputnikmusic gave the album a mixed review calling the album a "solid work" with "ear-pleasing melodies and some decent guitar work." He also complimented Gontier's voice stating, "the glaring draw to this type of music is the voice, and Adam gives a really great performance throughout and, mostly, holds your interest until the end." However, he was critical towards the featured artists on the album. For the song "Sirens", he remarked Sharon Den Adel's performance, "nothing short of cheesy and unnecessary," and on Sully Erna's performance on "The Hunted", he stated his parts were, "out of place from everything else the song has presented." Kaj Roth of Melodic said the group "aren't interested in experimenting but instead focus on tons of riffs and songs with killer hooks. You don't have to re-invent the wheel again so to speak."

== Track listing ==
Standard edition
No.	Title	Writer(s)	Length
1.	"Blind"	Adam Gontier	4:09
2.	"Sirens" (featuring Sharon den Adel of Within Temptation)	Gontier; Dustin Bates; Stephen Aiello	3:49
3.	"This August Day"	Gontier; Mike Mushok; Brian Sperber	4:00
4.	"The Hunted" (featuring Sully Erna of Godsmack)	Gontier; Mushok; Sperber; Sully Erna; Johnny Karkazis	3:43
5.	"Ghost"	Gontier; Sperber; Bates; Keith Wallen	4:32
6.	"Beast"	Gontier; Mushok; Wallen	3:26
7.	"The Fallen"	Gontier	3:59
8.	"Another Fight"	Gontier; Sperber; Twags Salter	3:47
9.	"Flawed Design"	Gontier; Mushok	3:47
10.	"Justify"	Gontier; Mushok; Sperber	4:07
11.	"Martyrs"	Gontier	4:12
Total length:			43:32

Walmart and European bonus tracks
No.	Title	Writer(s)	Length
12.	"Say Goodbye"	Gontier; Corey Lowery	3:34
13.	"Weak & Tired"	Gontier; Mushok	3:30
Total length:			50:36

== Personnel ==
Adapted from the album's liner notes.

Saint Asonia

- Adam Gontier – lead vocals, rhythm guitar
- Mike Mushok – lead guitar
- Cale Gontier – bass guitar, backing vocals
- Sal Giancarelli – drums

Additional musicians

- Sharon den Adel – additional vocals on "Sirens"
- Sully Erna – additional vocals on "The Hunted"
- Tim Roe – synthesizers, programming
- Brian Sperber – synthesizers, piano, programming

Production

- Brian Sperber – producer, engineer
- Tim Roe – engineer
- Ben Grosse – mixing
- Tom Baker – mastering

== Charts ==
Chart performance for Flawed Design
Chart (2019)	Peak position
Canadian Albums (Billboard)	68
US Billboard 200	171
US Alternative Albums (Billboard)	14
US Top Hard Rock Albums (Billboard)	7
