= Saint Asonia =

Canadian-American rock band

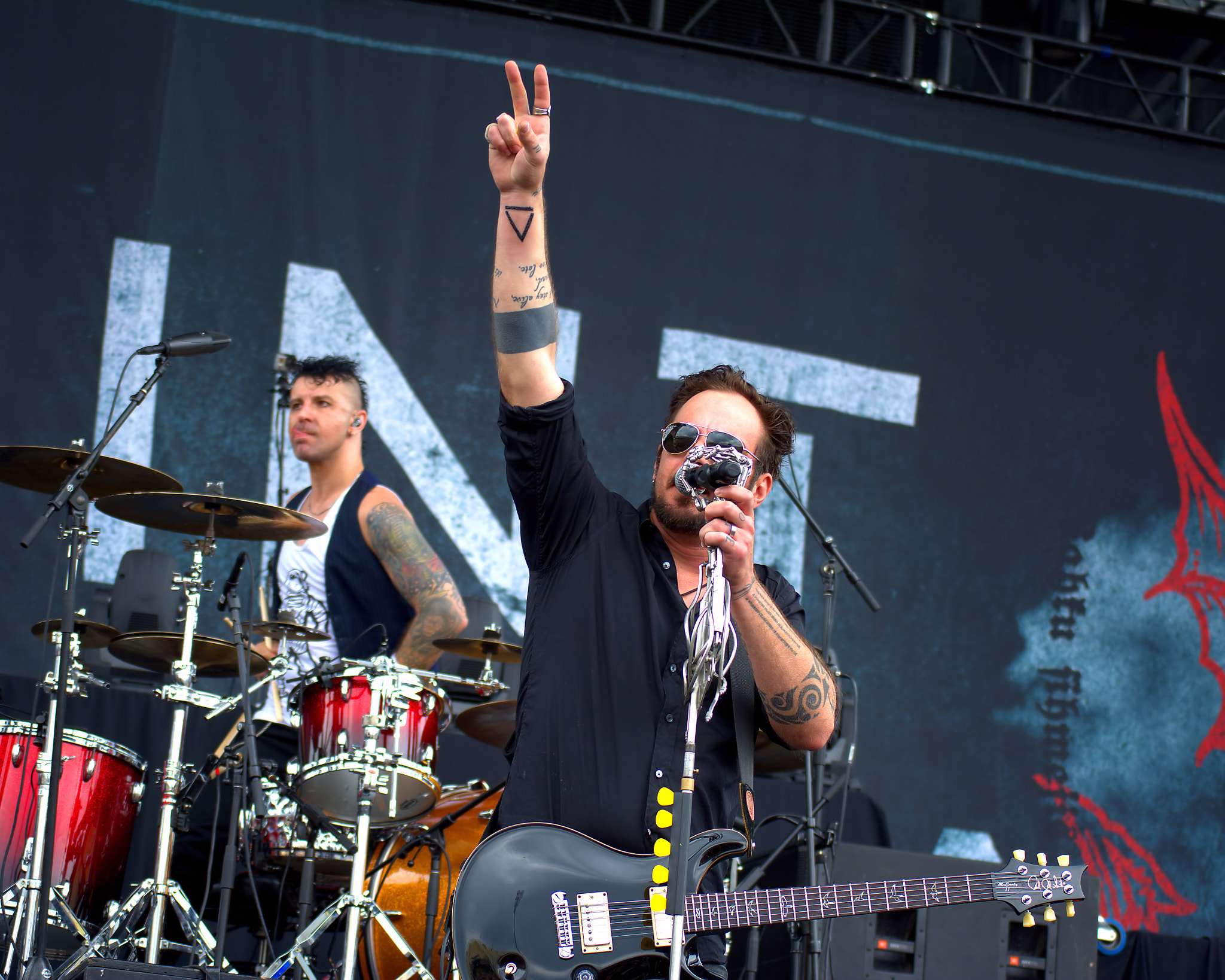
- Saint Asonia performing at Rock on the Range 2015

Background information
- Origin: Toronto, Ontario, Canada
- Genres: Post-grunge; hard rock; alternative metal
- Years active: 2015–2024 (Note: Currently on hiatus)
- Labels: RCA; Spinefarm
- Spinoff of: Three Days Grace; Staind; Finger Eleven; Art of Dying
- Members: Adam Gontier; Mike Mushok; Cale Gontier; Cody Watkins
- Past members: Rich Beddoe; Corey Lowery; Sal Giancarelli
- Website: saintasonia.com

Saint Asonia (stylized as SΔINT ΔSONIΔ) is a Canadian-American rock supergroup consisting of lead vocalist and rhythm guitarist Adam Gontier, lead guitarist Mike Mushok, bassist and backing vocalist Cale Gontier, and drummer Cody Watkins. In 2017, the band's original drummer, Rich Beddoe, left the band and was replaced by Mushok's Staind bandmate Sal Giancarelli, and one year later bassist and backing vocalist Corey Lowery left the band to join Seether and his place was taken by Adam Gontier's cousin Cale Gontier. The band formed in Toronto, Canada in 2015 after Adam Gontier's departure from Three Days Grace in 2013. Their second studio album, titled Flawed Design, was released on October 25, 2019. On January 26, 2020, Art of Dying drummer Cody Watkins became the new drummer for Saint Asonia replacing Sal Giancarelli.

The band went on hiatus after Adam Gontier rejoined Three Days Grace in October 2024.

== History ==
=== Formation and self-titled album (2015–2018) ===
In April 2014, Staind guitarist Mike Mushok and ex-Three Days Grace singer Adam Gontier began writing songs together, without the intention of creating a band. They ended up writing 11-12 tracks and were impressed with what they had written. They recorded a three-song demo and garnered the interest of RCA Records. The duo later enlisted former Finger Eleven drummer Rich Beddoe, and former Dark New Day bassist Corey Lowery to complete their lineup. The band released their first teaser early May 2015, which featured the fact that "25 Top Ten Rock Singles" were shared between each member, 17 of which are number ones, and teased the band's first single, logo and clips of the band. On May 15, 2015, the group released their debut single "Better Place". They made their debut live performance at Rock on the Range as the opening act for the main stage on May 16, and were billed as a special guest. When asked about the title of the band, Adam Gontier stated that they are "...more like refugees that just hit it off creatively."

In June 2015, the band announced that their debut self-titled album would be released on July 31 that same year via RCA Records featuring 11 tracks. Johnny K was secured as the producer for their debut album. The album's lead single, "Better Place", reached the US Mainstream Rock chart and the Canada Rock chart at number eight and number nine respectively. The band premiered a new track titled, "Blow Me Wide Open", on June 29. The album's second single "Let Me Live My Life" was released on July 17, 2015. Their debut self-titled album peaked at number 29 on the Billboard 200 and sold 13,000 copies in its first week. The album also topped the US Top Hard Rock Albums chart. Saint Asonia embarked on a headlining tour in August 2015 in support of the album. They also joined Seether in a fall 2015 tour. In February 2016, Saint Asonia joined the first part of the 2016 Disturbed tour, as an opening act.

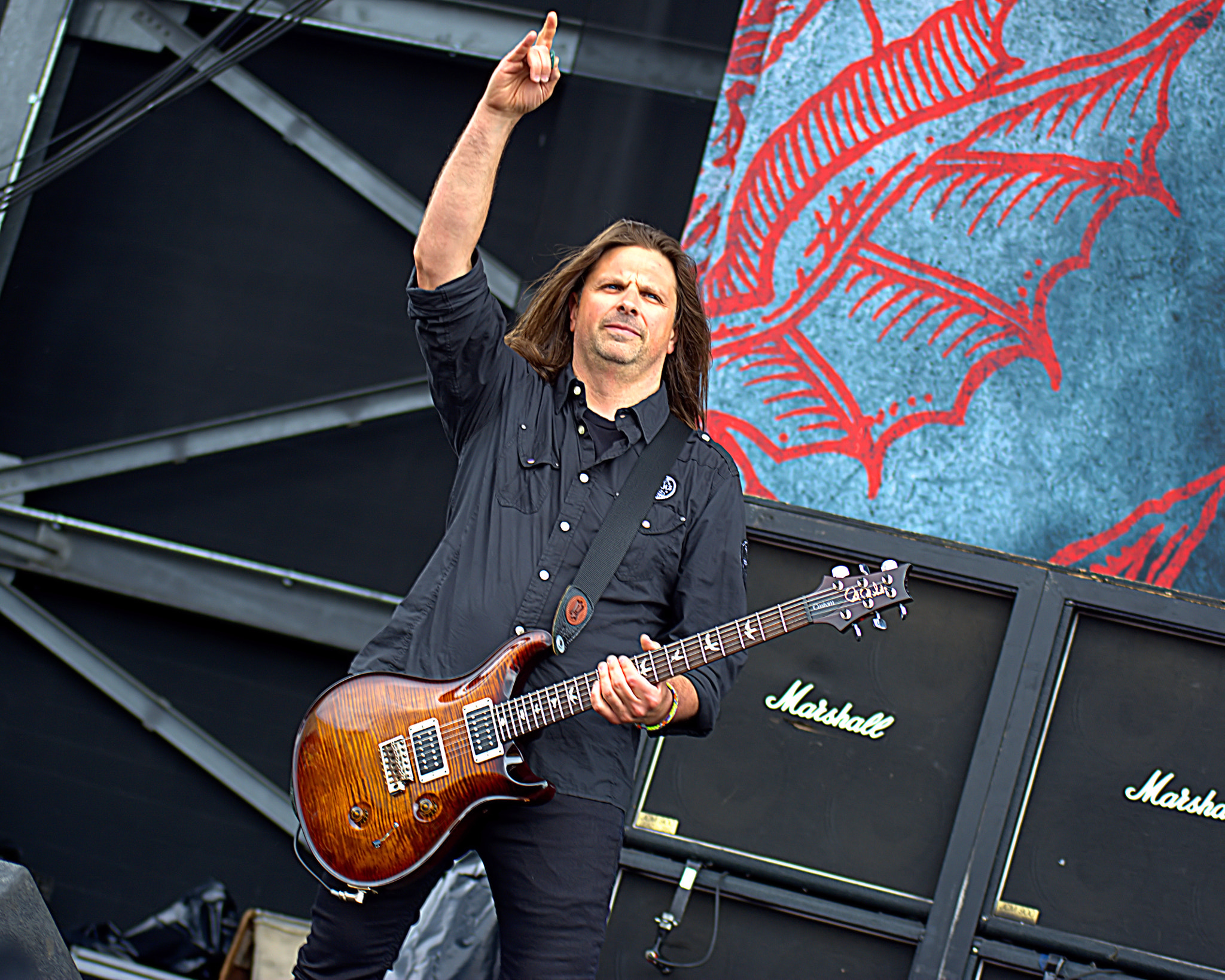
Guitarist Mike Mushok, 2015

On April 29, 2016, Saint Asonia released a cover of the Phil Collins song, "I Don't Care Anymore" on their YouTube channel, which was later released in the iTunes Store on May 6, 2016.

On June 5, 2017, drummer Rich Beddoe confirmed that he had left Saint Asonia on good terms to do other things. On July 12, 2017, the band played their first show with Mike Mushok's former Staind bandmate Sal Giancarelli on drums. Lowery departed the band during the summer of 2018 to join Seether full-time and was replaced by Art of Dying bassist and Adam Gontier's cousin Cale Gontier.

=== Flawed Design, Introvert/Extrovert and temporary hiatus (2019–present) ===
On February 21, 2019, Saint Asonia announced that they signed with Spinefarm Records and that a follow-up album to their first album was in the works. The group began recording their second studio album in 2019 with producer Brian Sperber.

On July 24, 2019, the band revealed their new single "The Hunted" featuring Sully Erna. The song serves as the lead single from their second studio album Flawed Design. On September 20, 2019, Saint Asonia released a new track, "Beast" and announced the release date of the album. Flawed Design was officially released on October 25, 2019. The album peaked at number 171 on the Billboard 200. On January 26, 2020, it was announced that Art of Dying drummer Cody Watkins had joined the band as their new drummer replacing Giancarelli. The group played three shows in Canada in March 2020 with The Standstills joining them. The band was set to open for Alter Bridge on their Walk the Sky tour in the spring of 2020, as well as Breaking Benjamin on their summer 2020 tour, but due to the COVID-19 pandemic, their tour with Alter Bridge was postponed and their tour with Breaking Benjamin was cancelled.

On November 18, 2021, the band released a cover of "Blinding Lights" by The Weeknd. On April 19, 2022, the band teased a new single on their Twitter account with an image taken from the new music video, along with the lyrics "We've been drowning for far too long." The group premiered the new single on May 6, 2022, titled, "Above It All". Along with this release, they announced an EP titled, Introvert, which was released on July 1, 2022. The group announced another EP, Extrovert that was released on November 18, 2022. In addition, the band released the lead single "Wolf". The band released both EPs physically as Introvert/Extrovert with bonus tracks on December 9, 2022. They joined Theory of a Deadman and Skillet on the Rock Resurrection tour from February to March 2023. A fall leg of the tour was later announced with the group re-joining them. The band also embarked on the Devastate Tour in May. In November 2023, the band released a new version of "Wolf", featuring John Cooper of Skillet. In December 2023, Adam Gontier was featured on Thousand Foot Krutch's 2023 version of their single, "Let the Sparks Fly".

The band joined Black Stone Cherry on a US co-headlining tour from February to March 2024. In July 2024, it was announced that the group was joining Theory of a Deadman on their Unplugged Tour in October and November. However, on September 13, 2024, the group dropped out of the tour citing "personal matters." Shortly after, on October 3, Adam Gontier returned to Three Days Grace full-time, with Matt Walst (who replaced him in 2013) remaining a lead vocalist as well. Saint Asonia promptly announced a temporary hiatus and that they would be back soon.

On October 10, 2025, the band released a cover of "Paranoid" by Black Sabbath, which had originally been recorded for Extrovert, but was released as a tribute to Ozzy Osbourne.

== Musical styles and influences ==
Their music has been described as post-grunge, hard rock, alternative metal and nu metal. Their debut studio album has been described as post-grunge and hard rock, blended with "catchy vocal melodies." The album was compared to their peers, including Filter and Nickelback. Their second studio album Flawed Design, has been described as alternative rock. The album's material was inspired by Gord Downie, Chris Cornell and Chester Bennington. The band's EP, Extrovert focuses on hooky and melodic riffs, and has been described as alternative rock.

== Band members ==
Current

- Adam Gontier – lead vocals, rhythm guitar (2015–2024)
- Mike Mushok – lead guitar (2015–2024)
- Cale Gontier – bass, backing vocals (2018–2024)
- Cody Watkins – drums, percussion (2020–2024)

Touring

- Tavis Stanley – lead guitar (2023–2024)

Former

- Rich Beddoe – drums, percussion (2015–2017)
- Corey Lowery – bass, backing vocals (2015–2018)
- Sal Giancarelli – drums, percussion (2017–2020)

Timeline

== Discography ==
Saint Asonia discography
- Studio albums: 2
- Compilation albums: 1
- Singles: 9
- Music videos: 6

=== Studio albums ===
List of studio albums, with selected chart positions
| Title | Details | Peak chart positions | | | | Sales |
| Title | Details | CAN | US | US Alt. | US Hard Rock | Sales |
|---|---|---|---|---|---|---|
| Saint Asonia | Released: July 31, 2015; Label: RCA Records | 9 | 29 | 2 | 1 | US: 13,000 |
| Flawed Design | Released: October 25, 2019; Label: Spinefarm Records | 68 | 171 | 14 | 7 | |

=== Compilation albums ===
List of compilation albums with selected details
| Title | Album details |
|---|---|
| Introvert/Extrovert | Released: December 9, 2022; Label: Spinefarm Records |

=== Extended plays ===
List of extended plays with selected details
| Title | EP details |
|---|---|
| Introvert | Released: July 1, 2022; Label: Spinefarm Records |
| Extrovert | Released: November 18, 2022; Label: Spinefarm Records |

=== Singles ===
List of singles, with selected chart positions
| Title | Year | Peak chart positions | | | | Album |
| Title | Year | CAN Rock | CIS | US Main. | US Rock | Album |
|---|---|---|---|---|---|---|
| "Better Place" | 2015 | 9 | 247 | 8 | 31 | Saint Asonia |
| "Let Me Live My Life" | 2015 | 23 | — | 10 | 33 | Saint Asonia |
| "The Hunted" (featuring Sully Erna) | 2019 | 43 | — | 7 | 40 | Flawed Design |
| "Blind" | 2020 | — | — | 22 | — | Flawed Design |
| "Ghost" | 2020 | — | — | — | — | Flawed Design |
| "Above It All" | 2022 | 34 | — | 21 | — | Introvert/Extrovert |
| "Devastate" | 2023 | 35 | — | 22 | — | Introvert/Extrovert |
| "Let the Sparks Fly" (with Thousand Foot Krutch) | 2023 | — | — | — | — | The End is Where We Begin: Reignited |
| "Wolf" (original or featuring John Cooper) | 2024 | 11 | — | 21 | — | Introvert/Extrovert |
"—" denotes a recording that did not chart.

=== Promotional singles ===
| Title | Year | Album |
|---|---|---|
| "Blow Me Wide Open" | 2015 | Saint Asonia |
| "Fairy Tale" | 2015 | Saint Asonia |
| "Trying to Catch Up with the World" | 2015 | Saint Asonia |
| "I Don't Care Anymore" | 2016 | —N/a |
| "Beast" | 2019 | Flawed Design |
| "This August Day" | 2019 | Flawed Design |
| "Blinding Lights" | 2021 | Introvert/Extrovert |
| "Better Late Than Never" | 2022 | Introvert/Extrovert |
| "Chasing the Light" | 2022 | Introvert/Extrovert |

=== Music videos ===
| Title | Year | Album | Director(s) |
|---|---|---|---|
| "Better Place" | 2015 | Saint Asonia | P. R. Brown and Adam Gontier |
| "Fairy Tale" | 2017 | Saint Asonia | Unknown |
| "The Hunted" | 2019 | Flawed Design | P. R. Brown |
| "Ghost" | 2020 | Flawed Design | Unknown |
| "Above It All" | 2022 | Introvert/Extrovert | Justin Reich |
| "Devastate" | 2023 | Introvert/Extrovert | Justin Reich |
| "Wolf" | 2024 | Introvert/Extrovert | Justin Reich |

== Awards ==
Loudwire Music Awards

| Year | Nominee / work | Award | Result |
|---|---|---|---|
| 2015 | Saint Asonia | Best New Artist of 2015 | Won |

Canadian Radio Music Awards

| Year | Nominee / work | Award | Result |
|---|---|---|---|
| 2016 | "Better Place" | Best New Group or Solo Artist: Mainstream Rock | Nominated |
