= Introvert/Extrovert =

Compilation album by Saint Asonia
- Released: December 9, 2022
- Recorded: 2020
- Genres: Alternative metal; hard rock
- Length: 50:32
- Label: Spinefarm
- Producer: Anton DeLost

Saint Asonia chronology
Flawed Design (2019)	Introvert/Extrovert (2022)

Singles from Introvert/Extrovert
- 1. "Above It All" Released: May 6, 2022; 2. "Wolf" Released: October 21, 2022; 3. "Devastate" Released: February 7, 2023

Introvert/Extrovert is a compilation album by Canadian-American rock supergroup Saint Asonia. It was released on December 9, 2022 through Spinefarm Records. The album was released physically and combines both their previous EPs Introvert and Extrovert. It is the band's last release before they entered a temporary hiatus in October 2024, following Adam Gontier's return to Three Days Grace.

== Background and recording ==
=== Introvert EP ===
The Introvert EP was released on July 1, 2022. The EP was announced on May 6, 2022 along with the lead single "Above It All". The EP also includes a cover of The Weeknd's "Blinding Lights" and promotional single "Better Late Than Never". The EP was written during the height of the COVID-19 pandemic. Speaking about Introvert, Adam Gontier stated, "The title was fitting with the way the songs were written. We wrote and recorded individually. It's a weird situation to make a record and not to be in the same room as your band. I felt like an introvert when I was working on these songs." The EP was recorded outside of Toronto, which was produced by Anton DeLost. Guitarist Mike Mushok recorded his parts from his home studio in Connecticut.

=== Extrovert EP ===
The Extrovert EP was released on November 18, 2022. The lead single "Wolf" was released on October 21, 2022. "Devastate" was released as the second single from the EP on February 7, 2023. A music video for the song premiered on March 16, 2023. The group embarked on the Rock Resurrection Tour in March and April 2023, with support from Theory of a Deadman and Skillet. They later headlined the Devastate Tour in May.

A seventh song was recorded for the EP, a cover of Black Sabbath's "Paranoid". It went unreleased until October 10, 2025, following Ozzy Osbourne's death in July that same year.

== Critical reception ==
Professional ratings
Review scores
Source	Rating
Blabbermouth.net	5/10 stars
The Front Row Report	9/10 stars

Taylor Markarian of Blabbermouth.net gave a mixed review on the Introvert EP. He criticized the EP for its predictability and stated that the tracks were "difficult to distinguish from one another." He did however, praise the song "So What", calling it the standout track. He also complimented the track, "Left Behind" for its guitar solo. Despite the mixed review, he remarked, "each song is just catchy enough to keep listening."

Reggie Edwards of The Front Row Report gave a positive review on Extrovert, calling the EP, "a hard-hitter from front to back and has no filler whatsoever." He praised the lead track, "Devastate", as well as the second track, "Break the Mold", stating, "an emotion-filled epic track with some of the catchiest guitars Mushok has ever laid down." He ended off noting, "Saint Asonia continue to prove why they shouldn't be remembered just for what they've done in the past but that their legacy continues to be built." Samuel Stevens of Crucial Rhythm stated, "The six tracks on Extrovert are quite in-your-face, heavier, and are a more technical set of tunes. Whereas the seven tracks on Introvert were more straight to the point, more stripped back in a sense, and more 'radio friendly'."

== Track listing ==
All tracks are written by Adam Gontier, except "Blinding Lights", with additional writers where noted.

Introvert/Extrovert
No.	Title	Writer(s)	Length
1.	"Above It All"	Anton DeLost; Bill Watkins; Cale Gontier; Cody Watkins; Mike Mushok	3:19
2.	"Better Late Than Never"	DeLost; C. Gontier; C. Watkins	3:31
3.	"Chew Me Up" (featuring Terrible Johnny)	Johnny Stevens; Mushok	3:39
4.	"So What"	DeLost; C. Gontier; C. Watkins	3:11
5.	"Left Behind"	B. Watkins; C. Watkins; Mushok	3:33
6.	"Bite the Bullet"		3:32
7.	"Blinding Lights" (The Weeknd cover)	Abel Tesfaye; Ahmad Balshe; Jason Quenneville; Max Martin; Oscar Holter	3:03
8.	"Devastate"	DeLost; Keith Wallen	3:32
9.	"Break the Mold"	Cody Quistad	3:00
10.	"Over It"	C. Gontier; Mark Holman	3:05
11.	"Wolf"	Johnny Andrews	3:18
12.	"Better Now"	Chris Dawson; James Beattie	3:38
13.	"Chasing the Light"	Blair Daly; Zac Maloy	3:22
14.	"Above It All" (acoustic)	DeLost; B. Watkins; C. Gontier; C. Watkins; Mushok	3:21
15.	"Devastate" (acoustic)	DeLost; Wallen	3:28
Total length:			50:32

Introvert EP
No.	Title	Length
1.	"Above It All"	3:19
2.	"Better Late Than Never"	3:31
3.	"Chew Me Up" (featuring Terrible Johnny)	3:39
4.	"So What"	3:11
5.	"Left Behind"	3:33
6.	"Bite the Bullet"	3:32
7.	"Blinding Lights"	3:03
Total length:		23:50

Extrovert EP
No.	Title	Length
1.	"Devastate"	3:32
2.	"Break the Mold"	3:00
3.	"Over It"	3:05
4.	"Wolf"	3:18
5.	"Better Now"	3:38
6.	"Chasing the Light"	3:22
Total length:		19:55

== Personnel ==
Credits for Introvert/Extrovert adapted from AllMusic.

Saint Asonia

- Adam Gontier – lead vocals, rhythm guitar
- Cale Gontier – bass guitar, backing vocals
- Mike Mushok – lead guitar
- Cody Watkins – drums

Additional musicians

- Terrible Johnny – guest vocals on "Chew Me Up"

Production

- Anton DeLost – mixing, producer, recording
- Ted Jensen – mastering engineer
