= The Hunted (song) =

Single by Saint Asonia featuring Sully Erna

from the album Flawed Design
- Released: July 24, 2019
- Recorded: 2019
- Genre: Alternative metal; hard rock
- Length: 3:43
- Label: Spinefarm
- Songwriters: Adam Gontier; Mike Mushok; Sully Erna; Johnny K; Brian Sperber
- Producer: Sperber

Saint Asonia singles chronology
"Let Me Live My Life" (2015)	"The Hunted" (2019)	"Blind" (2020)

Music video
- "The Hunted" on YouTube

"The Hunted" is a song by Canadian-American rock supergroup Saint Asonia. It was released on July 24, 2019, as the lead single from their second studio album Flawed Design. The song features Sully Erna, the lead singer from American rock band Godsmack.

== Background and composition ==
The band teased the song on July 17, 2019, which features a guest appearance by Godsmack frontman, Sully Erna. They recorded the song with producer Brian Sperber in New York earlier that year. Lead singer Adam Gontier spoke about the meaning behind the song stating, "'The Hunted' is a song about struggling to find your place in life." Guitarist Mike Mushok added, "I think that having 'The Hunted' as our first single is a great representation of where the band is going." The track runs at 100 BPM and is in the key of D minor.

== Music video ==
The band previewed the music video through a new Snapchat Lens which puts fans right into the video's key scene. The video for "The Hunted" was released on September 23, 2019 and was directed by P.R. Brown. Gontier spoke about the music video:

"I'm super excited to share 'The Hunted' video with our fans. We worked with PR Brown, who did our 'Better Place' video from the first record, again. He's also done all of Saint Asonia's record artwork and is absolutely brilliant. He's an amazing photographer and his vision always seems to line up perfectly with ours. 'The Hunted' video sort of has a Little Red Riding Hood vibe to it. But it's a little more 'creepy,' if you will. It's kind of a straightforward song, and I really wanted the video to be simple and visually intriguing. I think we've achieved that."

As of October 2022, the music video for "The Hunted" has over 1 million views on YouTube.

== Credits and personnel ==
Credits for "The Hunted" adapted from the album's liner notes.

Saint Asonia

- Adam Gontier – lead vocals, rhythm guitar
- Mike Mushok – lead guitar
- Cale Gontier – bass
- Sal Giancarelli – drums

Additional musicians

- Sully Erna – vocals, featured artist
- Brian Sperber – bass
- Tim Roe – keyboards

Production

- Brian Sperber – producer
- Tim Roe – recording engineer, programming

== Charts ==
=== Weekly charts ===
Weekly chart performance for "The Hunted"
Chart (2019)	Peak position
Canada Rock (Billboard)	43
US Mainstream Rock (Billboard)	7

=== Year-end charts ===
Year-end chart performance for "The Hunted"
Chart (2020)	Position
US Mainstream Rock (Billboard)	47

== Release history ==
Release history and formats for "The Hunted"
Region	Date	Format	Label	Ref.
Various	July 24, 2019	Digital download; streaming	Spinefarm	
United States	August 6, 2019	Active rock	Spinefarm	
