= Going to a Disco =

"Going to a Disco" is an electro-funk-dance song written by Lynsey de Paul and Mike Moran, and released as the duo's second penned single for Martyn Ford on Mountain Records (catalog number TOP30), released on the 12 August 1977 in the UK and Europe. This was the first Mountain label single to be distributed by Phonogram and had the characteristic moulded plastic label. The recording was produced by Ford and John Punter, and was the follow-up release to Ford's UK hit single, "Let Your Body Go Downtown". It was also released as a 12 inch single with the catalog number "MOUNT 1". The record received generally good reviews in the music as well as the mainstream press, with the Kent Evening News music correspondent writing "follow-up to the funk single Let Your Body Go Downtown and should provide another hit for the orchestra". It recently received plays at Seven by Seven, an open decks vinyl playing club based in Leeds, U.K.
