= AnnaSophia Robb =

American actress, model, and singer (born 1993)

- Robb in 2026
- Born: December 8, 1993 (age 32); Denver, Colorado, U.S.
- Education: New York University
- Occupations: Actress; model; singer
- Years active: 2003–present
- Spouse: Trevor Paul (m. 2022)
- Website: annasophiarobb.com

AnnaSophia Robb (born December 8, 1993) is an American actress, model, and singer. She began her career as a child actress making her feature film debut in Because of Winn-Dixie (2005). Robb then starred in a string of successful films playing notable roles such as Violet Beauregarde in Tim Burton's Charlie and the Chocolate Factory (2005), Leslie Burke in Bridge to Terabithia (2007), Sara in Race to Witch Mountain (2009), and surfer Bethany Hamilton in Soul Surfer (2011). She has also acted in Jumper (2008), Sleepwalking (2008), The Way Way Back (2013), Rebel Ridge (2024), and I Play Rocky (2026).

On television, Robb took the lead role of Carrie Bradshaw on The CW's series The Carrie Diaries (2013–2014). She portrayed Samantha Parkington in the television movie Samantha: An American Girl Holiday (2004). Robb has acted in the PBS period series Mercy Street (2016–2017), the Hulu limited series The Act (2019), Hulu miniseries Little Fires Everywhere (2020), the Peacock drama series Dr. Death (2021), and the NBC drama series Grosse Pointe Garden Society (2025).

== Early life ==
Robb was born on December 8, 1993, in Denver, Colorado, the only child of Janet, an interior designer, and David Robb, an architect. She was named after her maternal great-grandmother, Anna Sophie, and her paternal grandmother, Anna Marie. Robb is of Danish, English, Irish, Scottish, German, and Swedish descent. She grew up in a devout Christian home and was homeschooled. Robb started taking an interest in acting and began by performing in front of people on her church stage. She competed in dance and gymnastics for four and a half years, but quit to focus on acting. Robb attended Arapahoe High School in Centennial, Colorado, and graduated in 2012.

== Career ==
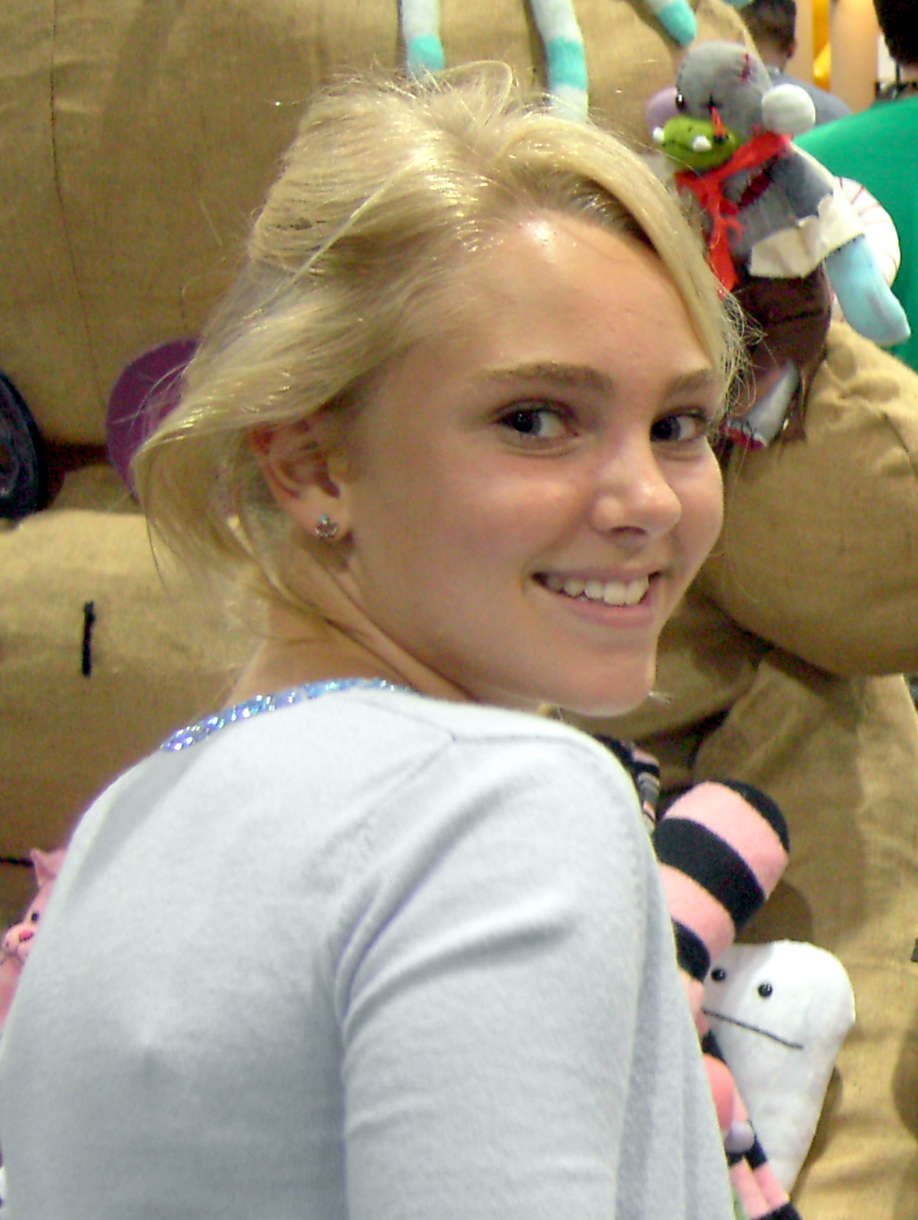
Robb's portrayal of Leslie Burke in Bridge to Terabithia was highly praised; one critic enjoyed her "engaging" performance", and thought "only the story's vibrant young heroine [...] draws us in enough to care"

At age eight, Robb was scouted by an agent, and she and her mother drove to Los Angeles. After several auditions, Robb was invited to appear in a national commercial for Bratz dolls. After appearing in a commercial for McDonald's, Robb had a small role in "Number One Fan", an episode of the television series Drake & Josh. Her first major role was the title character in the television special Samantha: An American Girl Holiday.

Robb's two big-screen appearances in 2005 were adaptations of popular children's books. She starred as Opal in Because of Winn-Dixie, and as Violet Beauregarde in Tim Burton's adaptation of Charlie and the Chocolate Factory. The latter was a major box office success worldwide and helped escalate Robb's popularity among preteen audiences.

In 2005, Robb was the face of Trad Clothing, helping to design and model a fashion line for girls. The following year, she had a guest role on the cartoon show Danny Phantom as the voice of Danielle "Dani" Fenton. Robb played Leslie Burke in Bridge to Terabithia with Josh Hutcherson, which opened in U.S. theaters on February 16, 2007. She recorded a song for the soundtrack titled, "Keep Your Mind Wide Open", and the accompanying video received rotation on the Disney Channel. The song peaked at number 90 on the Billboard Hot 100 during the week of March 1, 2007, giving Robb her first charting single. Robb was a fan of the book before being cast in the role, saying that it "touched me in a way I hadn't been touched by a book before".

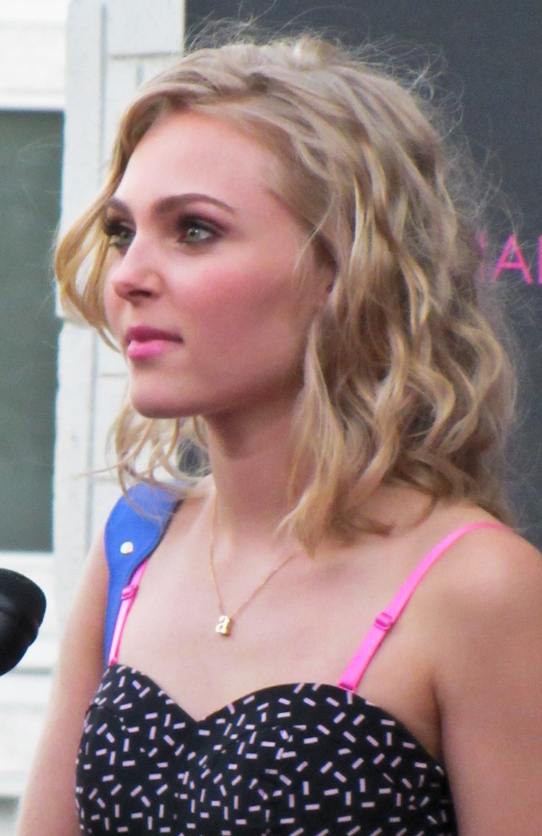
Robb at an event for Material Girl in 2013

Robb went on to appear in The Reaping; Have Dreams, Will Travel; Jumper; and Spy School. Despite negative reviews of the film overall, Robb's performance in Sleepwalking garnered praise. Time film critic Richard Schickel said: "There is a wonderful range to Robb's work...this is extraordinarily mature acting from someone this young, and she wins our sympathy without once begging for it." In 2008, Robb recorded the voice of Mary Magdalene in The Word of Promise: Next Generation – New Testament: Dramatized Audio Bible. She also starred in Race to Witch Mountain (2009). In 2010, she appeared in The Space Between. Robb then starred in Soul Surfer, playing Bethany Hamilton, who continued to surf after losing her arm in a shark attack.

In May 2011, Robb was announced to star as Wendy Darling in Pan, but later dropped out of the project. On February 3, 2012, it was reported that Robb had landed a role in Life at These Speeds. Later that month, she was cast as the young Carrie Bradshaw in The CW's Sex and the City prequel, The Carrie Diaries, and appeared in the teen comedy, The Way, Way Back.

In October 2013, Robb started filming for A Conspiracy on Jekyll Island, playing the cancer-stricken daughter of lead characters played by Frank Grillo and Minnie Driver; it was released as The Crash in 2017.

Robb played the role of Alice Green in the PBS Civil War historical drama series Mercy Street from 2016 to 2017.

In February 2023, Robb was attached to the film A Confederacy of Thelma, which, as of September 2024, has yet to go into production. In April 2024, she was attached to Grosse Pointe Garden Society, a new series ordered by NBC;, which debuted in February 2025 to "mixed or average" reviews, according to metacritic.

In 2026, Robb appeared in the films Magazine and I Play Rocky.

== Personal life ==
Robb enrolled at New York University in 2014 and graduated in 2018. On September 7, 2021, she announced her engagement to her boyfriend Trevor Paul on Instagram. They got married on September 10, 2022, in a three-day celebration within the Catskill and Shawangunk Mountains in New York state.

Robb participated in the 2023 Hollywood labor disputes.

== Filmography ==
Key
†	Denotes films that have not yet been released

=== Film ===
Year	Title	Role	Notes	Ref.
2003	Daddy's Day	Anna	Short film	
2005	Because of Winn-Dixie	India Opal Buloni		
2005	Charlie and the Chocolate Factory	Violet Beauregarde		
2007	Bridge to Terabithia	Leslie Burke		
2007	The Reaping	Loren McConnell		
2007	Have Dreams, Will Travel	Cassie "Cass" Kennington		
2008	Jumper	Young Millie Harris		
2008	Sleepwalking	Tara Reedy		
2008	Spy School	Jackie "Jack" Hoffman	Direct-to-video	
2009	Race to Witch Mountain	Sara		
2010	The Space Between	Samantha "Sam" Jean McLeod		
2011	Soul Surfer	Bethany Hamilton		
2013	The Way, Way Back	Susanna Thompson		
2013	Khumba	Tombi	Voice role	
2014	Sofia Coppola's The Little Mermaid	Ariel		
2015	Jack of the Red Hearts	Jacqueline "Jack" Ferguson		
2017	The Crash	Creason Clifton	Direct-to-video	
2017	Freak Show	Mary Jane (Blah Blah Blah)		
2018	Down a Dark Hall	Katherine "Kit" Gordy		
2019	Jewels to Shoes	Aspiring Actress		
2020	Words on Bathroom Walls	Rebecca		
2021	Goodnight Darling	Eldest Daughter		
2021	Lansky	Anne Lansky		
2024	Holiday House	Shelley		
2024	Rebel Ridge	Summer McBride		
2025	Jean Jacket	Jean Jacket		
2026	Magazine	Beatrice		
2026	I Play Rocky	Sasha Czack		
2027	Supermax †	FBI Agent		
2027	ESC †	Mallory		
2027	A Confederacy of Thelma †	Patricia		

=== Television ===
Key
†	Denotes television productions that have not yet been released

Year	Title	Role	Notes	Ref.
2004	Drake & Josh	Liza	Episode: "Number One Fan"	
2004	Samantha: An American Girl Holiday	Samantha Parkington	TV movie	
2006	Danny Phantom	Danielle "Dani" Fenton / Phantom	Voice role; episode: "Kindred Spirits"	
2013–2014	The Carrie Diaries	Carrie Bradshaw	Title role	
2014	Robot Chicken	Yasmin, Cleo	Voice role; episode: "Catdog on a Stick"	
2016–2017	Mercy Street	Alice Green	Main cast	
2019	The Act	Lacey Hutches	Main cast	
2020	Little Fires Everywhere	Young Elena Richardson	2 episodes	
2020	The Expecting	Emma Fortner	Main cast; also known as "Emma"	
2021	Dr. Death	Michelle Shughart	Main cast (Season 1)	
2022	Ziwe	Jane Knight	Episode: "Juneteenth"	
2025	Grosse Pointe Garden Society	Alice Morris	Main cast	
TBD	Overcompensating †	Chels	Recurring (Season 2)	

=== Theater ===
Year	Title	Role	Venue	Ref.
2019	Mac Beth	Witch 1	Lucille Lortel Theatre, Off-Broadway	
2025	All Nighter	Darcie (replacement)	The Newman Mills Theater, Off-Broadway	

=== Video games ===
Year	Title	Role	Notes	Ref.
2005	Charlie and the Chocolate Factory	Violet Beauregarde	Voice	

=== Audio ===
Year	Title	Role	Notes	Ref.
2008	The Word of Promise: Next Generation – New Testament	Mary Magdalene	Voice; Dramatized Audio Bible	
2020	Marvels	Marcia Hardesty	Voice; 10 episodes (Podcast)	
2020	Day by Day	Riley O'Malley	Voice; 2 episodes (Podcast)	

=== Music videos ===
Year	Title	Artist	Role	Ref.
2007	"Keep Your Mind Wide Open"	AnnaSophia Robb	Herself	
2020	"She's Lost Control"	Joy Division	Housewife	
2021	"Shivers"	Ed Sheeran	Sophie	
2023	"Guiding Light (Anniversary Edition)"	Foy Vance	Grace	

== Discography ==
=== Soundtrack ===
Year	Single	Album	Chart position
Year	Single	Album	US
2007	"Keep Your Mind Wide Open"	Music from and Inspired by Bridge to Terabithia	90

== Awards and nominations ==
On March 30, 2008, Robb won her first career award when she was named Leading Young Actress at the Young Artist Awards for her role in Bridge to Terabithia. The film itself won a Young Cast award. On April 24, 2009, she received the Horizon Award at the 14th Annual Palm Beach International Film Festival. She was awarded the Rising Star Award at the Denver Film Festival on November 12, 2009.

Year	Association	Category	Work	Result	Ref.
2005	Young Artist Awards	Best Performance in a TV Movie, Miniseries or Special – Leading Young Actress	Samantha: An American Girl Holiday	Nominated	
2006	Young Artist Awards	Best Performance in a Feature Film – Leading Young Actress	Because of Winn-Dixie	Nominated	
2007	Young Artist Awards	Best Performance in a Feature Film – Leading Young Actress	Bridge to Terabithia	Won	
2007	Young Artist Awards	Best Performance in a Feature Film – Young Ensemble Cast	Bridge to Terabithia	Won	
2008	Critics' Choice Movie Awards	Best Young Actress	Bridge to Terabithia	Nominated	
2008	OFTA Film Award	Best Youth Performance	Bridge to Terabithia	Nominated	
2009	Denver Film Festival	Rising Star Award	—N/a	Won	
2011	Teen Choice Awards	Choice Movie Actress: Drama	Soul Surfer	Nominated	
2012	MovieGuide Awards	Most Inspiring Performance in Movies	Soul Surfer	Nominated	
2013	Teen Choice Awards	Breakout Star	The Carrie Diaries	Nominated	
2013	Young Hollywood Awards	Superstar of Tomorrow	—N/a	Won	
2013	Phoenix Film Critics Society Awards	Best Acting Ensemble	The Way Way Back	Nominated	
2025	Astra Television Awards	Best Supporting Actress in a Limited Series or Streaming Movie	Rebel Ridge	Nominated	
