= No Way Out (Phil Collins song) =

Single by Phil Collins

from the album Brother Bear: An Original Walt Disney Records Soundtrack
- Released: March 22, 2004
- Recorded: 2003
- Genre: Pop; pop rock; soft rock; adult contemporary; gospel
- Length: 4:18 (single version); 2:37 (album version)
- Label: Walt Disney Records
- Songwriter: Phil Collins
- Producers: Phil Collins; Mark Mancina

Phil Collins singles chronology
"On My Way" (2003)	"No Way Out" (2004)	"Don't Let Him Steal Your Heart Away" (2004)

Audio
- "No Way Out" on YouTube

Audio
- "No Way Out" on YouTube

"No Way Out" is a 2003 song by English drummer and singer-songwriter Phil Collins from the Brother Bear film soundtrack released in 2004 as the second and final single from the soundtrack.

Two different versions of the song are placed onto the Brother Bear soundtrack. One is 4:18 minutes long and rock-driven, while the other is 2:37 minutes long and a more mellow keyboard-driven version.

== Background ==
The scene where the song is heard is when Kenai remorsefully admits to Koda that he killed his mother when he was a human. Koda runs away, heartbroken by the loss of his mother.

== International versions ==
The song was also performed by Phil Collins in various other languages besides English, namely German, French, Spanish, Italian and Japanese.

== Critical reception ==
GenesisNews said the song is a "compact...strong ballad" and reminiscent of older Phil Collins songs such as "I Wish It Would Rain Down" due to its "speed, harmonies and female backing vocals". AllMusic deemed it "forgettable". Some critics were not fond of its use in the final film, as it drowned out the dialogue in what was supposed to be the movie's emotional highpoint.

== Track listing ==
1. "No Way Out"
2. "No Way Out" (Radio Edit)
3. "No Way Out" (Instrumental)

== Charts ==
Chart (2004)	Peak position
German Singles Chart	74
Hungary (Rádiós Top 40)	26
