= One Nation Under =

Studio album by From Zero
- Released: May 15, 2001
- Recorded: 2000
- Studio: Mad Dog Studios (North Hollywood, California)
- Genres: Nu metal; alternative metal; hard rock
- Length: 44:27
- Label: Arista
- Producer: David Bianco

From Zero chronology
From Zero (1999)	One Nation Under (2001)	My So-Called Life (2003)

Singles from One Nation Under
- 1. "Check Ya" Released: 2001; 2. "Smack" Released: 2001; 3. "The Other Side" Released: 2001

Professional ratings
Review scores
Source	Rating
AllMusic	2.5/5 stars
melodic.net	3.5/5 stars
The Daily Vault	A

One Nation Under is the debut album by the Chicago-based nu metal music group From Zero. The album was released on May 15, 2001 via Arista Records. The songs "Check Ya" and "Erase" received a good deal of radio airtime on rock stations in the Midwest. As well, the video for "Check Ya" received moderate rotation on the short-lived MTVX channel. However, neither song gained nationwide hit status.

== Track listing ==
All tracks are written by From Zero.

No.	Title	Length
1.	"Smack"	3:19
2.	"Check Ya"	3:21
3.	"Erase"	3:28
4.	"The Other Side"	4:32
5.	"Circumstances"	3:33
6.	"Jeer"	4:10
7.	"Horrors"	3:57
8.	"Tomorrow's Light"	3:41
9.	"Suffering"	4:18
10.	"Undeniable"	3:15
11.	"Gone"	4:21
Total length:		44:27

Bonus tracks
No.	Title	Length
12.	"Mind Justice"	2:47
13.	"Pressure"	4:55
Total length:		52:09

== Personnel ==
- Jett – vocals
- Joe Pettinato – lead guitar
- Pete Capizzi – rhythm guitar, backing vocals
- Rob Likey – bass, backing vocals
- Kid – drums
- David Bianco – producer, mixing, engineering, mastering
