= Don't Let Him Steal Your Heart Away =

- Cover art. NOTE: 3D red cyan glasses are recommended to view this image correctly.

Single by Phil Collins

from the album Hello, I Must Be Going!
- B-side: "Thunder and Lightning"; "And So to F" (Live version)
- Released: 11 March 1983
- Recorded: 1982
- Genre: Soft rock
- Length: 4:47
- Label: Virgin (UK); Atlantic (International)
- Songwriter: Phil Collins
- Producers: Phil Collins; Hugh Padgham

Phil Collins singles chronology
"I Don't Care Anymore" (1983)	"Don't Let Him Steal Your Heart Away" (1983)	"I Cannot Believe It's True" (1983)
No Way Out (2004)	Don't Let Him Steal Your Heart Away (2004)	(Love Is Like a) Heatwave (2010)

Music video
- "Phil Collins – Don't Let Him Steal Your Heart Away (Official Music Video)" on YouTube

"Don't Let Him Steal Your Heart Away" is a song by Phil Collins from his second solo album Hello, I Must Be Going!. The song was the third single released from the album in the UK and charted at No. 45. The song was written around 1978–1979 during sessions for Face Value.

It was released to adult contemporary radio stations in the United States in 2004 to promote Collins's compilation album, Love Songs, and peaked at No. 5 on the Billboard Adult Contemporary chart.

== Critical reception ==
David Hepworth of Smash Hits called the song "marvelous", stating: "Phil Collins' steady improvement as a songwriter is highlighted here by the way he effectively welds three distinct musical sections into a piece that's guaranteed to become a late night radio regular." In a retrospective review of the album Hello, I Must Be Going!, Tim Sendra of AllMusic called the song "lovely".

Two other reviews were negative. Simon Tebbutt of Record Mirror wrote, "if the last single led you to believe the bloke had any get up and go, this will assure that it has all got up and gone. This is a song for elderly gentlemen who sit in exclusive clubs sipping brandy and mithering on about the good old days of the Sixties and Seventies." In Melody Maker, Edwyn Collins said, "I think this record should be dismissed. It's beneath my contempt. That's all. It's just not very good."

== Track listing ==
=== 7": Virgin / VS 572 (UK) ===
1. "Don't Let Him Steal Your Heart Away"
2. "Thunder and Lightning"

=== 12": Virgin / VS 572-12 (UK) ===
1. "Don't Let Him Steal Your Heart Away"
2. "And So to F" (Live)

== Personnel ==
- Phil Collins – vocals, acoustic piano, drums
- Daryl Stuermer – electric guitar
- John Giblin – bass guitar
- The Mountain Fjord Orchestra – strings
- Martyn Ford – string arrangements and conductor
- Gavyn Wright – orchestra leader

== Charts ==
Chart (1983)	Peak position
Ireland (IRMA)	18
UK Singles Chart	45

Chart (2004)	Peak position
US Adult Contemporary (Billboard)	5
