= Like China =

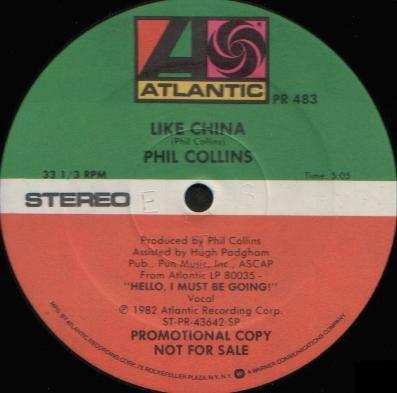

Promotional single by Phil Collins

from the album Hello, I Must Be Going!
- B-side: "I Cannot Believe It's True"
- Released: 1982
- Recorded: 1982
- Genre: Progressive rock
- Length: 5:05
- Label: Virgin Records (UK)
- Songwriter: Phil Collins
- Producers: Phil Collins, Hugh Padgham

Phil Collins singles chronology
"I Cannot Believe It's True" (1983)	"Like China" (1982)	"Against All Odds (Take a Look at Me Now)" (1984)

"Like China" is a song written and performed by the English singer and drummer Phil Collins from his second solo album Hello, I Must Be Going!. It was produced by Collins and Hugh Padgham.

== Song background ==
The song, the third track on the album, takes a cheerful rock music tone. It opens with Collins singing with a British Cockney accent. The song takes an upbeat tempo and features a discordant guitar introduction, as well as a guitar solo by Daryl Stuermer midway through the song.

The title is a traditional English expression meaning "gently and with great care". The lyrics portray an infatuated teenager attempting to convince a girl to date him despite their different social backgrounds — as emphasized by the singer's affected Cockney accent and his reference to being from "the other side of town". In doing this, the narrator says he will treat her as gently as china.

== Single release ==
The song was released as a US promo single from Hello, I Must Be Going! in 12" format. It entered the Billboard Mainstream Rock Tracks chart in December 1982, reaching #17.

"Like China" was also released as the B-side for the UK single "Why Can't It Wait 'Til Morning?" in 1983.

== Track listing ==
=== U.S. 12" Promotional single (Atlantic) ===
1. "Like China"
2. "I Cannot Believe It's True"

== Charts ==
Chart (1982)	Peak position
U.S. Billboard Mainstream Rock Tracks	17

== Personnel ==
- Phil Collins – keyboards, drums, vocals, handclaps
- Daryl Stuermer – guitars
- John Giblin – bass
