= Saint Asonia (album) =

Studio album by Saint Asonia
- Released: July 31, 2015
- Studio: Groovemaster Studios
- Genres: Post-grunge; hard rock
- Length: 40:32
- Label: RCA
- Producer: Johnny K

Saint Asonia chronology
Saint Asonia (2015)	Flawed Design (2019)

Singles from Saint Asonia
- 1. "Better Place" Released: May 16, 2015; 2. "Let Me Live My Life" Released: July 17, 2015

Saint Asonia is the debut studio album by Canadian-American rock supergroup Saint Asonia. The album was released on July 31, 2015, through RCA Records. It was released in European countries with two additional tracks on November 23, 2015.

== Background ==
In April 2014, Staind guitarist Mike Mushok and ex-Three Days Grace singer Adam Gontier began writing songs together, without the intention of creating a band. They ended up writing 11–12 tracks and were impressed with what they had written. They recorded a three-song demo and garnered the interest of RCA Records. The duo later enlisted former Finger Eleven drummer Rich Beddoe, and former Dark New Day bassist Corey Lowery to complete their lineup.

First announced via YouTube through a teaser in early May 2015, the first single "Better Place" was released on May 16, 2015. They announced the release date and track list for the album on June 18, 2015, via Billboard. On June 29, the album was made available for pre-order and those who ordered would get an instant download of "Blow Me Wide Open". The second single, "Let Me Live My Life" was released digitally on July 17, 2015.

Saint Asonia embarked on a headlining tour in August 2015 in support of the album. They also joined Seether in a fall 2015 tour. In February 2016, Saint Asonia joined the first part of the 2016 Disturbed tour, as an opening act.

This is also the only studio album from the band to feature drummer Rich Beddoe before he confirmed his departure in 2017, as well as the only studio album to feature bassist Corey Lowery before he confirmed his departure in 2018.

== Composition and recording ==
The album was produced by Johnny K at Groovemaster Studios in Chicago, Illinois. Gontier and Mushok were already writing songs and melodies before entering the studio with drummer Rich Beddoe to record the album. Gontier's uncle Tom Duffy provided the bass tracks for some of the songs from the album, while Lowery was hired afterward. The group originally opted to release a demo EP, however, they decided to put out a few singles and tour, while spending more time to put together "a solid record with good songs and not overthink it." According to Gontier, half of the album was written while they were in the studio recording. He also felt that he had more creative freedom writing the record, opposed to having to work with other writers and have them "tweaked and dissected." He described the record as "raw, real, and straight from our hearts," avoiding outside influences. The group finished recording in five weeks. Following production and recording for the album, Mushok stated, "I think it definitely exceeded what we were trying to accomplish; we definitely did it. I mean, the record kind of runs the gamut — there's some pretty heavy stuff, and there's a couple of songs on there that are just beautiful songs."

== Critical reception ==
Professional ratings
Review scores
Source	Rating
AllMusic	2.5/5 stars
Melodic	3/5 stars
Ultimate Guitar	7/10

The album was received with mixed reviews. James Christopher Monger of AllMusic gave the album a 2.5 out of 5 star rating. He criticized the songs for feeling like, "cast-offs from prior projects, with recycled melodies and lyrics that sound like they were derived from an angst-centric magnetic poetry kit." However he complimented some songs such as, "Better Place," "Dying Slowly," and "Blow Me Wide Open". Johan Wippsson of Melodic called the tracks, "Better Place" and "Happy Tragedy" a "harder and more straightforward version of Three Days Grace." Michael Smith of Renowned for Sound stated that the album, "is obviously and unashamedly a heavy rock album at its core" and "highlights all of the best qualities of its members." However, he was critical on the track "Fairy Tale" for its repetitiveness both in sound and lyrics, as well as criticizing "King of Nothing" calling it "an especially noticeable low point on the album." Ultimate Guitar said that the album is, "ready to please mainstream rock radio and guitarists alike with its brand of hard rock peppered with soulful (not kidding) ballads to boot."

== Commercial performance ==
The album debuted at number nine on the Canadian Albums Chart. It also reached number 29 on the Billboard 200, as well as topping the US Hard Rock Albums chart, selling 13,000 copies in its first week.

== Track listing ==
All tracks are written by Adam Gontier & Mike Mushok.

No.	Title	Length
1.	"Better Place"	3:36
2.	"Blow Me Wide Open"	3:44
3.	"Let Me Live My Life"	3:11
4.	"Even Though I Say"	4:08
5.	"Fairy Tale"	3:59
6.	"King of Nothing"	3:34
7.	"Waste My Time"	3:14
8.	"Dying Slowly"	3:32
9.	"Trying to Catch Up with the World"	4:29
10.	"Happy Tragedy"	3:38
11.	"Leaving Minnesota"	3:28
Total length:		40:32

European bonus tracks
No.	Title	Length
12.	"No Tomorrow"	3:27
13.	"Voice in Me"	3:42

=== Notes ===
- The titles of tracks 12 and 13 are swapped on streaming services

== Personnel ==
Credits for Saint Asonia adapted from AllMusic.

Saint Asonia

- Adam Gontier – lead vocals, rhythm guitar
- Mike Mushok – lead guitar
- Corey Lowery – bass guitar, backing vocals
- Rich Beddoe – drums

Additional musicians

- Thomas Duffy – bass guitar (tracks 3–6, 9, 12)
- Johnny K – bass guitar (tracks 1, 2, 8, 10)
- Alan Berliant – bass guitar (tracks 7, 11)
- Graham Czach – bass guitar (track 13)

Production

- Johnny K – producer, engineer, mixing
- Matt Dougherty – assistant engineer, digital editing
- Bradley Cook – second assistant engineer
- Pete Murray – programming (tracks 3, 5, 6)
- Ted Jensen – mastering
- David Wolter – A&R
- Ryan Clark – art direction and design

== Charts ==
Chart performance for Saint Asonia
Chart (2015)	Peak position
Canadian Albums (Billboard)	9
US Billboard 200	29
US Alternative Albums (Billboard)	2
US Top Hard Rock Albums (Billboard)	1
