= Spy School =

2008 American comedy-drama film

- Theatrical poster
- Directed by: Mark Blutman
- Written by: Mark Blutman; David DuBos
- Produced by: Robert Abramoff & Bill Lykins
- Starring: Forrest Landis; AnnaSophia Robb; Lea Thompson; D. L. Hughley
- Cinematography: Paul Elliott
- Edited by: Richard Halsey
- Music by: Robert Bayless
- Distributed by: Screen Media
- Release date: March 1, 2008
- Running time: 83 minutes
- Country: United States
- Language: English
- Budget: $3 million

Spy School (known internationally as Doubting Thomas or Lies and Spies) is a 2008 American comedy-drama film, released on March 1, 2008. Even though it was a 2008 release, it was first filmed in Albuquerque, New Mexico, in the summer of 2005. The film stars Forrest Landis and AnnaSophia Robb as the lead characters. The movie focuses on the adventures of Thomas Miller, in his efforts to save the President's daughter from being kidnapped.

== Plot ==
A twelve-year-old boy named Thomas Miller is a school troublemaker. He gets into fights, causes distractions in class, and tells lies. At the beginning of the movie, Thomas is seen fighting another student until Principal Hampton intervenes. He is next seen in class with Mrs. Bleckner, where he is assigned detention for goofing off.

While in detention, Mrs. Bleckner leaves to finish her nails and hair. Thomas sneaks out and goes to the library to read and talk with other students instead. On his way to the library, he overhears an unseen figure discussing a plot to kidnap the president's daughter on a cellphone. Petrified by this thought, Thomas leaves.

Thomas then encounters an FBI agent named Randal. Randal claims to be involved in researching the case and trying to stop it. Thomas explains what happened, and the two meet up with Albert, a fellow FBI Agent.

Randal, Albert, and Thomas all perceive that the kidnapper plans to strike during the school dance that weekend. Thomas invites his best friend Jackie to accompany him, but Principal Hampton and Mrs. Bleckner kick them out. They sneak in any way and continue to search to discover the kidnapper.

Albert joins Thomas and Jackie in their search. Meanwhile, Randal looks on his own and comes across the unseen kidnapper. The kidnapper, fearing being exposed, attacks Randal using a broom and drags him away.

Albert, Thomas, and Jackie continue searching the dance floor for clues, but none arise. However, there is a suspicious feeling lurking about. Meanwhile, Mrs. Bleckner is seen walking down the hall, patrolling as a hall monitor, where she hears banging on the door of the janitor's closet. Now suspicious, she opens the closet door and finds Randal inside, bound and gagged. She sets him free, and the two go to stop the janitor, who Randal reveals to be the villain.

Mrs. Bleckner and Randal arrive and run onto the dance floor. Mrs. Bleckner exclaims that the janitor is the kidnapper and that she just saved Randal's life. The janitor is outraged, grabs the president's daughter, and flees. Albert, Randal, Thomas, and Jackie chase him down and follow him onto a helicopter. Thomas jumps onto it, sneaks up on the janitor, and knocks him out before putting the helicopter on autopilot. A SWAT team and the National Guard appear with military-style assault rifles and get Thomas and the president's Daughter to safety. Thomas is worshiped as a hero, and everyone throws a huge celebration.

== Cast ==
- Forrest Landis as Thomas Miller
- AnnaSophia Robb as Jackie Hoffman
- Rider Strong as Mr. Randall
- Roger Bart as Principal Hampton
- Brian Posehn as Grissom
- Taylor Momsen as Madison Kramer
- Timmy Deters as Drake Chapman
- Mitch Rouse as Kip Miller
- Suzy Nakamura as Mrs. Bleckner
- Ezra Buzzington as Mr. Bailey
- Lea Thompson as Claire Miller
- D. L. Hughley as Albert

== Reception ==
Brian Costello of Common Sense Media gave the film three stars out of five, describing it as a "madcap tween story has cartoonish violence, some bullying."
