= Better Place (Saint Asonia song) =

Single by Saint Asonia

from the album Saint Asonia
- Released: May 16, 2015
- Genre: Alternative metal; alternative rock
- Length: 3:36
- Label: RCA
- Songwriters: Adam Gontier; Mike Mushok
- Producer: Johnny K

Saint Asonia singles chronology
"Better Place" (2015)	"Let Me Live My Life" (2015)

Music video
- "Better Place" on YouTube

"Better Place" is a song by Canadian-American rock supergroup Saint Asonia. It was released as the first single from their self-titled debut studio album. The song was released digitally on May 16, 2015, via Spotify and iTunes. It was nominated at the 2016 Canadian Radio Music Awards for the "Best New Group or Solo Artist: Mainstream Rock" award.

== Background and composition ==
After teasing the group's lineup, which was revealed to consist of lead vocalist and rhythm guitarist Adam Gontier, lead guitarist Mike Mushok, bassist Corey Lowery and drummer Rich Beddoe, they released their debut single on May 16, 2015. Gontier explained the meaning and writing behind "Better Place":

The song is about not letting other people around you drag you down after a number of years of being dragged down. And it's about getting out of that, breaking out, and getting to a better place. And there is a lot of that that I had to do over the last couple of years. And the writing process was great, it was a song that Mike had for a long time, beginning with the riff, and then I laid down some melodies and it was done.

The song also gives an insight as to why Gontier originally left Three Days Grace and his thoughts on how things played out.

"Better Place" was written by Adam Gontier and Mike Mushok, while production was handled by Johnny K. The song runs at 188 BPM and is in the key of F♯ major.

== Critical reception ==
Graham Finney of V13.net gave the track a positive review stating, "'Better Place' is an angsty slice of alt-rock that could quite easily have been lifted from the Three Days Grace back catalogue. As was the case with their other bands, 'Better Place' may be full of fuck you-angst but it has that radio-friendly twist to it that has not only seen it fly up the rock radio charts, but also hints that, come the July 31st release date for their self-titled debut album, Saint Asonia have a ready-made audience who are quite willing to lap this sort of thing up all day long."

== Chart performance ==
The song debuted at number 36 on the US Mainstream Rock chart for the week ending June 13, 2015. The song later peaked at number eight on the chart. "Better Place" also reached number 31 on the US Rock Airplay chart. The song reached the top 20 on the Active Rock Radio chart on its second week of release, making it one of the fastest growing songs of the year at the format. Speaking about the song's success, lead guitarist Mike Mushok told Guitar World, "From beginning to end I'm proud of how it came out. I don't think there's any filler."

== Music video ==
The band filmed a video for the song in Los Angeles with director P. R. Brown and it's been co-directed by Adam Gontier. The music video was released on July 31, 2015, the same day that Saint Asonia's debut album was released via RCA. The clip features the band performing at an abandoned building with singer Adam Gontier venturing out on a very narrow ledge to sing while the band performs inside. Speaking about creating the video, Gontier stated:

"I had a very clear vision of what I was trying to convey with this song and working together with P.R. Brown was a great experience. This video really makes the song come to life and is very meaningful to me personally, as I hope it will be to those who watch it."

== Personnel ==
Credits for "Better Place" adapted from album's liner notes.

Saint Asonia

- Adam Gontier – lead vocals, rhythm guitar
- Mike Mushok – lead guitar, backing vocals
- Corey Lowery – bass
- Rich Beddoe – drums

Additional musicians

- Johnny K – bass

Production

- Johnny K – producer, mixing, engineer
- Matt Dougherty – editing, assistant engineer
- Bradley Cook – assistant engineer
- Ted Jensen – mastering

== Charts ==
=== Weekly charts ===
Weekly chart performance for "Better Place"
Chart (2015)	Peak position
Canada Rock (Billboard)	9
US Mainstream Rock (Billboard)	8

=== Year-end charts ===
Year-end chart performance for "Better Place"
Chart (2015)	Position
US Mainstream Rock Songs (Billboard)	29

== Release history ==
Release history and formats for "Better Place"
Region	Date	Format	Label	Ref.
Various	May 16, 2015	Digital download; streaming	RCA	
