= Let Your Body Go Downtown =

1977 single by the Martyn Ford Orchestra

"Let Your Body Go Downtown" is a song co-written by Lynsey de Paul and Mike Moran, and recorded by the Martyn Ford Orchestra as a single on 18 March 1977 on the Mountain record label. A 12-inch single was also released. In an interview in 2024, Ford revealed he had asked close friends De Paul and Moran to write the song for him.

The single was also released in France, Germany, Italy and The Netherlands on Vertigo Records. It was a BBC Radio 1 "Record of the Week" and playlist by a number of UK regional radio stations. As noted by Record World magazine, it took the single three months to enter the UK Singles Chart. However, the song reached No. 38 on that chart, No. 34 on the NME singles chart, No. 37 on the EveryHit Retrocharts and No. 11 on the UK Disco Chart, published by Record Mirror. It was also released as a track on the album Ronnie Jones Presents Let-Your-Body-Go-With-The-Disco released on the Phillips record label in Italy and it received numerous radio plays there as listed in "Radiocorrier". A live performance of the song featuring Ford, his orchestra and backing singers was shown on the 12 May 1977 edition of Top of the Pops.

The song was followed by another de Paul/Moran penned release, "Going to a Disco", in a similar vein, also released on the Mountain record label in 1977 as a 7 inch and 12 inch single but did not chart although it received a positive reviews, for example from the British DJ James Hamilton, as well as in the British mainstream press. It is also mentioned alongside "Let Your Body Go Downtown" in the books The Virgin Encyclopedia of 70s Music and Complete UK Hit Singles 1952-2006.

"Let Your Body Go Downtown" is still played on the radio, most recently on the Ana Matronic Disco Devotion radio show on BBC Radio 2, on Funky Tuesday and on Disco Magic.
