= My So-Called Life (From Zero album) =

Studio album by From Zero
- Released: May 6, 2003
- Recorded: Morning View, Malibu, California; Village Studios, Los Angeles, California
- Genres: Nu metal, alternative metal
- Length: 41:31
- Label: Arista
- Producer: Warren Riker

From Zero chronology
One Nation Under (2001)	My So-Called Life (2003)

Singles from My So-Called Life
- 1. "Sorry" Released: 2003; 2. "Fleeting Glimpse" Released: 2003

Professional ratings
Review scores
Source	Rating
AllMusic	1.5/5 stars
melodic.net	3.5/5 stars

My So-Called Life is the second and final album by the Chicago-based nu metal music group From Zero. The album was released on May 6, 2003 via Arista Records. Due to a lack of promotion by Arista Records, poor reviews, and general changes in mainstream music tastes, the album did not sell many copies. The album features a cover of Phil Collins' "I Don't Care Anymore".

== Track listing ==
All tracks are written by From Zero except where noted.

No.	Title	Writer(s)	Length
1.	"Myself"		3:27
2.	"Lines"		4:17
3.	"Sorry"		3:50
4.	"My So-Called Life"		3:04
5.	"Sold Out"		4:01
6.	"I Don't Care Anymore"	Phil Collins	3:58
7.	"Time of Day"		3:28
8.	"Drama Queen"		3:03
9.	"Fleeting Glimpse"		4:36
10.	"Free Without a Struggle"		4:13
11.	"Believe"		3:34

== Personnel ==
- Jett – vocals, bass
- Pete Capizzi – rhythm guitar, backing vocals
- Joe Pettinato – lead guitar
- Kid – drums
- Warren Riker - producer, mixing, engineering, mastering
