= Above It All (song) =

Single by Saint Asonia

from the EP Introvert
- Released: May 6, 2022
- Recorded: 2020
- Genre: Hard rock
- Length: 3:19
- Label: Spinefarm
- Songwriters: Adam Gontier; Bill Watkins; Cody Watkins; Anton DeLost; Cale Gontier; Mike Mushok
- Producer: Anton DeLost

Saint Asonia singles chronology
"Ghost" (2020)	"Above It All" (2022)	"Wolf" (2022)

Music video
- "Above It All" on YouTube

"Above It All" is a song by Canadian-American rock supergroup Saint Asonia. It was released on May 6, 2022 as the lead single from the EP Introvert. The song was written by members of the band and Bill Watkins and was produced by Anton DeLost.

== Background ==
On April 19, 2022, the band teased the song on their Twitter account with an image taken from the music video, along with the lyrics "We've been drowning for far too long." The song is about rising above chaos, negativity, judgment and living the life you want to and not the life that is expected by others. Lead singer Adam Gontier wrote the song during the first lockdown in Canada after COVID hit. Gontier states:

"None of us had ever been through anything like this in our lifetimes and no one really knew how we as a society should act and deal with a global pandemic. I really felt it gave people a great opportunity to search inside themselves about how best to deal with these crazy circumstances and choose how they want to live their lives coming out of this."

Along with the song's release, the band announced the Introvert EP that was released on July 1, 2022.

== Music video ==
The video for "Above It All" premiered via YouTube on May 6, 2022 and was directed by Justin Reich.

== Credits and personnel ==
Credits for "Above It All" adapted from AllMusic.

Saint Asonia

- Adam Gontier – lead vocals, guitar
- Cale Gontier – bass guitar, backing vocals
- Mike Mushok – guitar
- Cody Watkins – drums

Production

- Anton DeLost – mixing, producer
- Ted Jensen – mastering engineer

== Charts ==
=== Weekly charts ===
Weekly chart performance for "Above It All"
Chart (2022)	Peak position
Canada Rock (Billboard)	34
US Mainstream Rock (Billboard)	21

=== Year-end charts ===
Year-end chart performance for "Above It All"
Chart (2022)	Position
Canada Active Rock (Mediabase)	47

== Release history ==
Release history and formats for "Above It All"
Region	Date	Format	Label	Ref.
Various	May 6, 2022	Digital download; streaming	Spinefarm	
United States	May 10, 2022	Active rock	Spinefarm	
