= Brother Bear (soundtrack) =

Brother Bear: An Original Walt Disney Records Soundtrack

Soundtrack album by Phil Collins, Mark Mancina and various artists
- Released: October 21, 2003
- Recorded: 2002–March 2003
- Studios: Firehouse Studios (Pasadena, CA); Signet Sound Studios and Image Recording Studios (Los Angeles); Capitol Studios and Conway Recording Studios (Hollywood); Piety Street Recording (New Orleans, LA); Todd-AO Scoring Stage (Los Angeles); Studio Academia; Greenwood Studios (Nunningen, Switzerland); Bulgarian National Radio
- Genre: Soundtrack
- Length: 48:50
- Label: Walt Disney Records
- Producers: Phil Collins; Mark Mancina; Rob Cavallo; Chris Montan

Phil Collins chronology
Testify (2002)	Brother Bear: An Original Walt Disney Records Soundtrack (2003)	The Platinum Collection (2004)

Singles from Brother Bear: An Original Walt Disney Records Soundtrack
- 1. "Look Through My Eyes" Released: October 13, 2003; 2. "On My Way" Released: 2003; 3. "No Way Out" Released: March 22, 2004

Brother Bear: An Original Walt Disney Records Soundtrack is the soundtrack to Disney's 2003 animated feature film Brother Bear. It contains the film's score composed by Mark Mancina and Phil Collins, as well as songs written by Collins, and performed by Tina Turner, The Blind Boys of Alabama, Oren Waters, The Bulgarian Women's Choir, and even Collins himself. Much of the soundtrack in the film consists of the songs performed by Collins as a montage, much like what was done with the earlier Disney soundtrack to film Tarzan, but not entirely. The album was released on October 21, 2003 by Walt Disney Records.

"On My Way" was featured prominently in commercials for the film. The song is about going off to new places with new friends, and Collins sings it during a montage when Kenai befriends Koda. The number is also sometimes listed as "Send Me on My Way".

As with Tarzan, Collins also performed French, German, Italian and Spanish versions of the songs featured.

== Track listing ==
All music is composed by Mark Mancina and Phil Collins; all songs written by Collins.

No.	Title	Performer(s)	Length
1.	"Look Through My Eyes"	Phil Collins	4:01
2.	"Great Spirits"	Tina Turner	3:23
3.	"Welcome"	Collins	3:38
4.	"No Way Out (Theme from Brother Bear)"	Collins	4:18
5.	"Transformation"	The Bulgarian Women's Choir	2:29
6.	"On My Way"	Collins	3:40
7.	"Welcome"	The Blind Boys of Alabama and Phil Collins with Oren Waters	3:14
8.	"No Way Out (Theme from Brother Bear)"	Collins	2:37
9.	"Transformation"	Collins	2:26
10.	"Three Brothers" (score)	Mark Mancina and Collins	6:44
11.	"Awakes as a Bear" (score)	Mancina and Collins	6:48
12.	"Wilderness of Danger and Beauty" (score)	Mancina and Collins	5:32
Total length:			48:50

"Welcome" was also featured as the theme for Walt Disney's Parade of Dreams at Disneyland.

Collins performed "Look Through My Eyes" on the British show Top Of The Pops when it was charted at number 20

== Personnel ==
Credits (Track 1)

- Phil Collins – vocals, drums, arrangements
- Jamie Muhoberac – keyboards
- Carmen Rizzo – programming
- Dan Chase – programming
- Tim Pierce – guitars
- Paul Bushnell – bass
- Rob Cavallo – arrangements
- David Campbell – string arrangements and conductor

Credits (Tracks 2–13)

- Phil Collins – instruments, vocal arrangements, arrangements (2–9), vocals (3, 4, 6–9), score composing (10–12)
- Mark Mancina – instruments, vocal arrangements, arrangements (2, 5–8), score composing (10–12)
- Jamie Muhoberac – keyboards
- Tim Heintz – acoustic piano, Hammond B3 organ
- Frank Marocco – accordion
- George Doering – guitars
- Tim May – guitars
- Dean Parks – guitars
- Tim Pierce – guitars
- Nathan East – bass guitar
- Trey Henry – bass guitar
- Jimmy Johnson – bass guitar
- Kenny Wild – bass guitar
- Luis Conte – percussion
- Michael Fisher – percussion
- Louis Mollino III – percussion
- Tommy Morgan – bass harmonica
- Pedro Eustache – world woodwinds
- Chris Montan – arrangements (4)
- Eddie Jobson – choral arrangements (5)
- Tanja Andreeva – choir coordinator (5)
- Lorena Williams – Inuit translation (5)
- Tina Turner – vocals (2)
- The Bulgarian Women's Choir – choir (5)
- The Blind Boys of Alabama – vocals (7)
- Oren Waters – vocals (7)
- David Metzger – orchestrations, vocal arrangements
- Ralph Morrison – concertmaster
- Don Harper – orchestra conductor
- Sandy de Crescent – score contractor
- Reggie Wilson – song contractor
- Carmen Carter – vocal contractor
- Bobbi Page – vocal contractor
- Booker White – supervising music copyist for Walt Disney Music Library

== Production ==
Track 1

- Rob Cavallo – producer
- Cheryl Jenets – production coordinator
- Allen Sides – recording
- Chris Lord-Alge – mixing
- Keith Armstrong – recording assistant
- Jimmy Hoyson – recording assistant
- John Morrical – recording assistant
- Tom Sweeney – recording assistant
- Tal Herzberg – Pro Tools engineer
- Doug McKeon – Pro Tools engineer
- Bernie Grundman – mastering at Bernie Grundman Mastering (Hollywood, California)

Tracks 2–13

- Phil Collins – producer (2–9, 13)
- Mark Mancina – producer (2, 5–8, 10, 11, 12)
- Chris Montan – producer (4)
- Chris Goldsmith – additional vocal production (7)
- Frank Wolf – recording and mixing (songs)
- Steve Kempster – recording and mixing (scores and songs)
- Chris Lord-Alge – mixing (4)
- Jimmy Hoyson, Ivo Keremidchiev, Ron Kurz and Andrew Page – additional engineers
- Kremena Anguelova, Vladislav Boyadjiev, Brian Dixon, Roumen Enchev, Steve Genewick, Mike Glines, Tom Hardisty, Tim Lauber, Evan Lloyd, Jason Locklin, Carsten Schmid, Ed Woolley – assistant engineers
- Johnny Whieldon – score assistant engineer
- Seth Dockstader, Marc Gebauer, David Marquette, Jay Selvester and Richard Wheeler – scoring crew
- Earl Ghaffari – music editing
- Daniel Gaber – music editing assistant
- Geoff Callingham, Danny Gillen and Steve Jones – technical crew for Phil Collins
- Rich Toenes – technical support
- Chuck Choi – technical consultant
- Bernie Grundman – mastering (4) at Bernie Grundman Mastering (Hollywood, California)
- Tom MacDougall – music production supervisor
- Deniece Hall – music production coordinator
- Andrew Page – music production manager
- Joel Berke and Jill Iverson – music production assistants

Other Credits

- Chris Montan – executive producer
- Patricia Sullivan Fourstar – album mastering at Bernie Grundman Mastering (Hollywood, California)
- Federico F. Tio – creative director
- John Blas and Arnaldo D'Alfonso – cover art
- Luis M. Fernández – art direction
- Marcella Wong – design
- Glen Lajeski – creative marketing
- Lorenzo Aguis – photos of Phil Collins
- Richard McLaren – photo of Tina Turner
- Steve Sherman – photo of The Blind Boys of Alabama

== Charts ==
Album

Year	Chart	Position
2003	U.S. Billboard 200	52
2003	U.S. Billboard Soundtracks	2

Singles

Year	Single	Artist	Chart	Position
2003	"Look Through My Eyes"	Phil Collins	Adult Contemporary	5

== Reception ==
- AllMusic link
- Common Sense Media link
