= Thru These Walls =

"Thru' These Walls"

Single by Phil Collins

from the album Hello, I Must Be Going!
- B-side: "Do You Know, Do You Care?"
- Released: 15 October 1982
- Recorded: May–September 1982 at Old Croft On 1" 8 track
- Genre: Art pop; art rock
- Length: 5:05
- Label: Virgin (UK); Atlantic (International)
- Songwriter: Phil Collins
- Producers: Phil Collins; Hugh Padgham

Phil Collins singles chronology
"If Leaving Me Is Easy" (1981)	"Thru' These Walls" (1982)	"You Can't Hurry Love" (1982)

Music video
- "Thru' These Walls" on YouTube

"Thru' These Walls" is a song by the English drummer Phil Collins. It was released as the UK lead-single in October 1982, from Collins' second solo studio album, Hello, I Must Be Going!, released on 5 November of the same year. The song is dark, which follows a vast majority of songs from the album, and is about a man listening through the wall to his neighbours partaking in sexual activities.

== Recording ==
The song has distinct similarities to Collins's debut solo single, "In the Air Tonight", featuring similar atmospheric opening chords on a Sequential Circuits Prophet-5 and also using the same gated reverb drum fill. In an interview with Melody Maker, Collins said that he exercised a "distinct lack of judgment" in copying the drum fill from "In the Air Tonight". The song also features one of Collins's attempts at a "Ringo Starr drum part", Starr being one of his biggest influences as a drummer.

== Release ==
The song was the first single by Collins that did not reach the Top 20 in the UK, peaking at No. 56 in the UK Singles Chart (it was not released as a single in the US)

== Music video ==
The music video for the song was directed by Stuart Orme, who also directed the video for "In The Air Tonight" and was photographed by DP Peter Mackay, and in 1983 it was released on the home video Phil Collins available on Video Home System (VHS) and LaserDisc (LD) which received a Grammy nomination for Best Video, Short Form.

Although the video appeared on Phil Collins "The Singles Collection" VHS, the music video itself did not appear officially for Internet streaming on Phil Collins' YouTube channel until June 2018.

== Track listing ==
7": Virgin / VS 524 (UK)

1. "Thru' These Walls"
2. "Do You Know, Do You Care?"

== Credits ==
1. "Thru' These Walls"
  - Phil Collins – keyboards, drums, vocals, marimba
  - Daryl Stuermer – guitars
  - Mo Foster – bass
2. "Do You Know, Do You Care?"
  - Phil Collins – vocals, keyboards, bass pedals, drums, timpani, trumpet
  - Daryl Stuermer – guitars
- Gavin Cochrane – photography

== Chart performance ==
Chart (1982)	Peak position
France (IFOP)	15
Ireland (IRMA)	27
Italy (FIMI)	17
Netherlands (Single Top 100)	48
Poland (Polish Music Charts)	21
Spain (AFYVE)	15
UK Singles (OCC)	56
UK Airplay (Record Business)	74
