= Look Through My Eyes =

Single by Phil Collins

from the album Brother Bear: An Original Walt Disney Records Soundtrack
- B-side: "Transformation"
- Released: 13 October 2003
- Recorded: 2002
- Genre: Pop; pop rock; adult contemporary
- Length: 4:00
- Label: Walt Disney
- Songwriter: Phil Collins
- Producer: Rob Cavallo

Phil Collins singles chronology
"Home" (2003)	"Look Through My Eyes" (2003)	"On My Way" (2004)

Audio
- "Look Through My Eyes (From "Brother Bear"/Soundtrack Version)" on YouTube

"Look Through My Eyes" is a song by English recording artist Phil Collins from the Brother Bear film soundtrack released in 2003 as the first single. It was later recorded by Everlife for the Bridge to Terabithia soundtrack and the Disneymania 4 album.

== Critical reception ==
Allmusic said of song "That's not to say that middle-of-the-road pop... and future American Idol standards such as "Look Through My Eyes" are devoid of craftsmanship -- they positively radiate Hollywood gloss -- it's simply indicative of pop culture's voracious appetite for audio fast food.". Commonsensemedia noted that Brother Bear songs like "Look Through My Eyes," "could prop the soundtrack of any number of movies about a young boy's self-discovery" due to not specifically evoking Inuit culture.

== Track listing ==
1. "Look Through My Eyes" – 4:00
2. "Look Through My Eyes" (Instrumental) – 4:00

== Personnel ==
- Phil Collins – vocals, drums, arrangements
- Jamie Muhoberac – keyboards
- Carmen Rizzo – programming
- Dan Chase – programming
- Tim Pierce – guitars
- Paul Bushnell – bass
- Rob Cavallo – arrangements
- David Campbell – string arrangements and conductor

== Charts ==
=== Weekly charts ===
Chart (2003–04)	Peak position
Belgium (Ultratip Bubbling Under Flanders)	12
Belgium (Ultratip Bubbling Under Wallonia)	4
Germany (GfK)	51
Hungary (Rádiós Top 40)	1
Italy (FIMI)	37
Netherlands (Dutch Top 40)	14
Netherlands (Single Top 100)	18
Switzerland (Schweizer Hitparade)	31
UK Singles (Official Charts)	61
US Adult Contemporary (Billboard)	5

=== Year-end charts ===
Chart (2003)	Position
Netherlands (Dutch Top 40)	95
Chart (2004)	Position
US Adult Contemporary (Billboard)	20
