= From Zero (band) =

American nu metal band

- Origin: Chicago, Illinois, U.S.
- Genres: Nu metal; alternative metal; hard rock
- Years active: 1998–2005
- Label: Arista
- Past members: Paulie Weiner; Peter Capizzi; Joe Pettinato; Avi Kopernik; Johnny Dinu; Rob Ruccia; Sonny DeLuca

From Zero was an American nu metal band formed in Chicago, Illinois in 1998. They were known for a more melodic approach to the genre compared to their rap metal peers. They released two major-label albums under Arista Records: One Nation Under (2001) and My So-Called Life (2003). Their most recognized single is "Check Ya", which peaked at number 37 on the Billboard Mainstream Rock Track chart. The band disbanded in 2005.

== History ==
=== Formation and major label debut ===
From Zero was formed in 1998. From Zero's music was distinguished from many earlier nu metal groups with its greater focus on melodies and correspondingly fewer elements of rap metal. Singer Sonny Deluca left in 1999, before shortly being replaced by Paul "Jett" Weiner from the band Faceman.

In 1999, the band independently released their self-titled EP (referred to as "The Green Album"). The album locally sold over 6,000 copies and attracted the attention of major record labels. They later signed with Arista Records and began opening for bands such as Disturbed.

Their first album, One Nation Under, was released in 2001. The band promoted the album using a self-published website, allowing fans to personally communicate with band members while they were on tour. They began touring with bands such as Amen, Nickelback, Godsmack, Deftones, and Puddle of Mudd. The song "Check Ya" from the album peaked at number 37 on the Mainstream Rock chart.

The band was promoted by the Real World: Back to New York residents while the cast were working for Arista. Their song was panned as being "overproduced".

=== Sophomore album and breakup ===
In 2003, the band released the album My So-Called Life on Arista. Bassist Rob Ruccia left the band before the release of the album to pursue a career in music production, and the band recruited Avi Kopernik to play bass. Ruccia, along with members of Nonpoint, would later launch the independent record label 361 Degrees Records.

After being dropped by Arista less than a month after the release of My So-Called Life, they went to work preparing for their third album. Song writing did not progress, so Jett began to concentrate on a day job to support his family. Joe Pettinato, who already had a construction business, then left the band, and the rest of the group followed. Two songs from the intended album, "Middle of the Road" and "My Own Destiny", were able to be streamed on their official PureVolume page before the service shut down.

=== DIEM and Fate Accomplis ===
In late 2007, it was revealed that Jett (vocals), Pete Capizzi (guitars), and Joe Pettinato (guitars) reunited to form a new band called Diem. The project was also planned to include Keith Dailey on bass and backup vocals, and Pete Capizzi, instead of playing guitar, was planned to be playing drums for the band. This project, after releasing a couple demos on MySpace, ended after Jett left, and various lead singer changes throughout 2008. Around 2008, after leaving DIEM, Jett formed a project called Fate Accomplis in 2008 with former member of Faceman, Aaron Bright. They recorded music for an EP titled "Illusion of Reprieve" in the early 2010s, although it was never released until 2022.

== Members ==
=== Final members ===
- Paulie Gervasio Weiner "Jett" - lead vocals, keyboards, bass guitar (1999–2005)
- Peter Capizzi - rhythm guitar, backing vocals (1998–2005)
- Joe Pettinato "BOD" - lead guitar (1998–2005)
- Avi Kopernik - bass guitar (2002–2005)
- Johnny Dinu "Kid" - drums (1998–2005)

=== Former members ===
- Rob Ruccia "Likey" - bass guitar, backing vocals (1998–2002)
- Sonny DeLuca - lead vocals (1998–1999)

== Discography ==
=== Albums ===
- From Zero (1999)
- One Nation Under (2001)
- My So-Called Life (2003)

=== Singles ===
- "Check Ya" (2001) No. 37 on Mainstream Rock Tracks
- "The Other Side" (2001)
- "Erase" (2001)
- "Smack" (2001)
- "Sorry" (2003)
- "Fleeting Glimpse" (2003)
