= Martyn Ford =

English musician (born 1944)

Martyn Ford (born 28 April 1944) is an English musician, best known for his orchestral contributions to rock music albums of the 1970s and 1980s.

Born in Rugby, Warwickshire, Ford was originally classically trained; he studied French horn at the Royal Academy of Music. While in his senior year there, he formed his own orchestra, which debuted at the Royal Albert Hall a few months after he graduated. He then found work as an arranger and conductor for releases by Caravan, Barclay James Harvest, Bryan Ferry, Ginger Baker, Johnny Nash, Three Man Army, Japan and Elton John, as well as for the soundtrack for the film Tommy. He also played horn for the Spencer Davis Group early in the decade. He also recorded on his own as the Martyn Ford Orchestra; his 1976 album Smoovin featured Mike Moran, Ann Odell, Simon Phillips, Morris Pert, John Gustafson and Mel Collins. It also spawned a hit in the UK Singles Chart, "Let Your Body Go Downtown", which peaked at No. 38 in 1977 and No. 34 on the NME singles chart. The song was written by Lynsey de Paul and Moran, who also wrote the follow-up single "Going to a Disco", which failed to reach the UK chart in the summer of 1977.

In the 1980s, he worked with Kate Bush, Phil Collins and Dave Davies, amongst others.
