= Both Sides =

1993 studio album by Phil Collins

Studio album by Phil Collins
- Released: 8 November 1993
- Recorded: 1992–1993
- Studios: Lakers Lodge (Loxwood, West Sussex); The Farm (Chiddingfold, Surrey, England)
- Genre: Art rock
- Length: 67:10
- Labels: Virgin, Atlantic
- Producer: Phil Collins

Phil Collins chronology
Serious Hits... Live! (1990)	Both Sides (1993)	Dance into the Light (1996)

Singles from Both Sides
- 1. "Both Sides of the Story" Released: 18 October 1993; 2. "Everyday" Released: 3 January 1994; 3. "We Wait and We Wonder" Released: 25 April 1994

Professional ratings
Review scores
Source	Rating
AllMusic	4/5 stars
Entertainment Weekly	B−
Goldmine	3.5/5 stars
The Irish News	4/5 stars
PopMatters	6/10 stars
Powermetal.de	9/10
Rolling Stone	2.5/5 stars
Scunthorpe Telegraph	10/10

Both Sides is the fifth studio album by the English singer-songwriter Phil Collins. Featuring an adult-oriented soft rock-based sound, released on 8 November 1993 by Virgin in the UK and Atlantic in the US. Collins created the album entirely by himself, without any collaborations from outside songwriters and performers. The record received generally positive critical reviews, with Stephen Thomas Erlewine of AllMusic stating that the album's "artistically satisfying" songs feature "troubled, haunting tales".

The album achieved commercial success, reaching no. 1 in the United Kingdom, no. 8 in Australia, and no. 13 in the United States. Collins also went on the highly successful Both Sides of the World Tour upon its release. That effort involved over a hundred performances in a tour that went over a year.

A special two-disc edition of the album, featuring the Live from the Board – Official Bootleg EP, as a second disc, titled Far Side... of the World: Gold Souvenir Tour Edition, was released in Southeast Asia and Australia in 1995. It peaked at no. 13 in Australia. A newly remastered, two-disc deluxe edition of the album was released on 29 January 2016, as part of the Take a Look at Me Now series of Collins's studio album reissues.

In a 2016 interview with The Guardian, Collins named Both Sides as his "favourite album from a songwriting and creative perspective". Collins also said: "It was very much a solo album. I played everything, the songs just streamed out of me, and as a writer, that's the kind of thing that you dream of. It was the second divorce! Personal relationships at that time were tangled, is a better way of saying it, and it all came very spontaneously."

== Development ==
Both Sides was made by Collins entirely on his own, without usual collaborators producer Hugh Padgham, guitarist Daryl Stuermer, bassist Leland Sklar and the Phenix Horns. After recording demos at home, the album was finished in six weeks at the Farm with the help of producer/engineer Paul Gomersall. It is mistakenly thought that Phil physically played all the instruments on this album but the guitars were computer generated sounds played through a keyboard. As a result, it is seen as his most personal album. "In the end I had 17 songs, and kicked out all those that did not fit that mood. As far as performance is concerned this has more heart and soul than anything I have done before."

In addition, Collins wrote sleeve notes explaining the meaning of each song, another first. Collins expresses both his feelings and personal problems and addresses political issues over the course of the album. He touches on politics and "the daily cloud of terrorism Britain seems to live under" on "We Wait and We Wonder", as well as a maturing disenchantment with the youth culture on "We're Sons of Our Fathers". The overall sound of Both Sides marked a return to the dark and melancholy style of his early albums Face Value and Hello, I Must Be Going!, which were largely grounded on the themes of relationship breakdown and loss. Mirroring the circumstances in which those albums were conceived, Collins' marriage to Jill Tavelman was also failing around the time that Both Sides was written. About the influence of his emotions on his songs, he adds: "I have reached this point. Very intimate, very private songs seem to flow easily. I suddenly felt I had a lot to say."

== Critical response ==
Both Sides was initially met with lukewarm reviews, particularly on adult contemporary radio, being criticised for its over-reliance on slow, dark and downbeat songs. The album was preceded by the title track as the first single, reaching no. 7 in the UK and no. 25 in the US (in a disappointing chart performance considering the lead singles from his two previous albums were no. 1 hits in America). The album itself was released weeks later, reaching to no. 13 in the US, though it still went platinum there. Both Sides was a hit in other European countries such as the UK (where it was the 8th biggest-selling album of 1993, despite only being available for the final eight weeks of the year), Germany & Switzerland, reaching no. 1 all over Europe, but with a limited success, due to the lack of hit singles. The ballad "Everyday", released in early 1994, was another Top 20 hit in the UK, peaking at no. 15, and became the biggest hit single from the album in the US, reaching no. 24 on the Billboard Hot 100 and no. 2 on the Adult Contemporary chart. The third and last single, "We Wait and We Wonder" — a political anthem — reached no. 45 in the UK.

However, over time the album's reputation gradually improved, and reviews for the 2016 reissue were considerably more positive, AllMusic's Stephen Thomas Erlewine rated it 4 out of 5 stars and commended Collins' stepping out of big pop hooks and embracing an introspective art rock style for this album, which he saw as "quietly compelling". On Goldmine magazine's review, Patrick Prince gave the album 3.5 stars, praising the melancholic style of the album as a welcome return to material similar to Face Value, although he criticized the ballads "Everyday" and "There's a Place for Us", saying they are "as bad as any sappy movie soundtrack cut ready to be forgotten".

== Track listing ==
All tracks are written by Phil Collins, except where noted.

No.	Title	Length
1.	"Both Sides of the Story"	6:42
2.	"Can't Turn Back the Years"	4:40
3.	"Everyday"	5:43
4.	"I've Forgotten Everything"	5:15
5.	"We're Sons of Our Fathers"	6:24
6.	"Can't Find My Way"	5:09
7.	"Survivors"	6:05
8.	"We Fly So Close"	7:33
9.	"There's a Place for Us"	6:52
10.	"We Wait and We Wonder"	7:01
11.	"Please Come Out Tonight"	5:46

Live from the Board – Official Bootleg bonus disc (Disc two of Far Side... of the World: Gold Souvenir Tour Edition 1995)
No.	Title	Writer(s)	Length
1.	"Sussudio"		7:09
2.	"Easy Lover" (featuring Nathan East and Arnold McCuller)	Collins; Philip Bailey; East	5:02
3.	"Separate Lives" (featuring Amy Keys and McCuller)	Stephen Bishop	6:15
4.	"My Girl"	Smokey Robinson; Ronald White	3:48

Extra Sides bonus disc (Disc two of 2016 deluxe edition)
No.	Title	Length
1.	"Take Me with You" (B-side)	5:22
2.	"Both Sides of the Story" (live 1994)	8:11
3.	"Can't Turn Back the Years" (live 1994)	6:54
4.	"Survivors" (live 1994)	6:42
5.	"Everyday" (live 1994)	6:03
6.	"We Wait and We Wonder" (live 2005)	7:42
7.	"Can't Find My Way" (demo)	4:48
8.	"I've Been Trying"	5:01
9.	"Both Sides of the Story" (MTV Unplugged 1994)	5:20
10.	"Hero" (demo)	4:47

== Unreleased tracks ==
Several instrumental tracks were recorded and subsequently released as extra tracks on both singles for "Everyday" and "We Wait and We Wonder". These instrumental tracks include "Rad Dudeski" and "Don't Call Me Ashley". In addition, there were other various B-sides that were released from the Both Sides sessions ("Take Me with You", "For a Friend") and a few cover songs that made it on other various albums. "For a Friend" was written as a tribute to Collins's longtime friend, saxophonist Don Myrick, who was wrongfully killed by a policeman in Los Angeles while Collins was composing the album. Myrick had played sax solos on Collins's songs "If Leaving Me Is Easy", "The West Side", "One More Night" and "All of My Life".

Another song that originated from these sessions was "Hero", which Collins gave to his friend David Crosby, who had provided backing vocals on some tracks on Collins' previous studio album, "...But Seriously". The finished version of the song, with Collins on backing vocals and with added drums, appeared on Crosby's 1993 album "Thousand Roads", and was released as a single. A demo of the track, without Crosby, was released as a B-side.

There has been discussion about a song called "Deep Water Town". It is from the Both Sides sessions and did not make the cut, was never released nor widely circulated amongst collectors. A very early "demo" of it was released on the official fanclub website in 2011. It is more of an improvisation from which only the first part of the chorus was eventually adapted into the "completed" track. This supposed final version, which surfaced on YouTube around the time of Collins' 75th birthday in January 2026, features an atmospheric drum machine, keyboard sounds (no piano), and lyrics telling a story about a disaster at sea and families left behind.

In November 2004, Collins himself commented on the song on the forum of his old official website: "DEEP WATER TOWN...again I scratch my head and ask how did someone get it... I don't think it was ever released, or am I going slowly senile. It was a pretty song about a disaster at sea, and the families left behind. Obviously one of my more cheerful pre-divorce moments. Circa Both Sides...."

== Personnel ==
=== Musicians ===
- Phil Collins – all instruments

=== Production ===
- Produced by Phil Collins
- Engineered by Paul Gomersall
- Assistant engineer – Mark Robinson
- Recorded at home on 12 tk (PC engineering) with additional overdubs recorded at The Farm (Surrey, England).
- Mastered by Bob Ludwig at Gateway Mastering (Portland, Maine, US).
- Continuous surveillance by Geoff Callingham and Mike Bowen
- Cover photography by Trevor Key
- Artwork – Hills Archer Ink

== Charts ==
=== Weekly charts ===
Chart (1993)	Peak position
Australian Albums (ARIA)	8
Austrian Albums (Ö3 Austria)	1
Canada Top Albums/CDs (RPM)	6
Danish Albums (Hitlisten)	6
Dutch Albums (Album Top 100)	1
Estonian Albums (Eesti Top 10)	10
European Albums (Music & Media)	1
Finnish Albums (The Official Finnish Charts)	6
French Albums (SNEP)	1
German Albums (Offizielle Top 100)	1
Italian Albums (Musica e Dischi)	1
Japanese Albums (Oricon)	21
New Zealand Albums (RMNZ)	7
Norwegian Albums (VG-lista)	4
Portuguese Albums (AFP)	1
Spanish Albums (AFYVE)	3
Swedish Albums (Sverigetopplistan)	3
Swiss Albums (Schweizer Hitparade)	1
UK Albums (Official Charts)	1
US Billboard 200	13
US Cashbox Top 100 Albums	10

Chart (2016)	Peak position
Belgian Albums (Ultratop Flanders)	106
Belgian Albums (Ultratop Wallonia)	103
Hungarian Albums (MAHASZ)	23
Spanish Albums (Promusicae)	68

=== Year-end ===
Chart (1993)	Position
Canada Top Albums/CDs (RPM)	64
Dutch Albums (Album Top 100)	29
German Albums (Offizielle Top 100)	37
UK Albums (OCC)	8

Chart (1994)	Position
Austrian Albums (Ö3 Austria)	31
Canada Top Albums/CDs (RPM)	81
Dutch Albums (Album Top 100)	43
German Albums (Offizielle Top 100)	5
Swiss Albums (Schweizer Hitparade)	10
US Billboard 200	85

== Certifications ==
Region	Certification	Certified units/sales
Australia (ARIA)	Platinum	70,000^{^}
Austria (IFPI Austria)	Platinum	50,000^{*}
Brazil (Pro-Música Brasil)	Gold	100,000^{*}
Chile	Platinum	25,000
France (SNEP)	Platinum	300,000^{*}
Germany (BVMI)	3× Platinum	1,500,000^{^}
Japan (RIAJ)	Gold	100,000^{^}
Netherlands (NVPI)	Platinum	100,000^{^}
New Zealand (RMNZ)	Platinum	15,000^{^}
Norway (IFPI Norway)	Platinum	50,000^{*}
Spain (Promusicae)	2× Platinum	200,000^{^}
Sweden (GLF)	Gold	50,000^{^}
Switzerland (IFPI Switzerland)	Platinum	50,000^{^}
United Kingdom (BPI)	2× Platinum	600,000^{^}
United States (RIAA)	Platinum	1,000,000^{^}
^{*} Sales figures based on certification alone.^{^} Shipments figures based on certification alone.
