= Take It On Up (album) =

Studio album by Pockets
- Released: 1978
- Genres: Soul, funk
- Label: Columbia
- Producers: Verdine White, Robert Wright

Pockets chronology
Come Go with Us (1977)	Take It On Up (1978)	So Delicious (1979)

Take It On Up is the second album by the American band Pockets, released in 1978 by Columbia Records. The album reached No. 22 on the Billboard Top R&B Albums chart. Maurice White served as the executive producer.

== Critical reception ==
Professional ratings
Review scores
Source	Rating
AllMusic	3/5 stars
The Washington Post	(favourable)

The Toronto Star called Pockets "a post-Motown soul group mixing sweet falsetto ballads with raunchy funk numbers."

Alex Henderson of AllMusic wrote that "Pockets' second album Take It On Up isn't as strong as its predecessor Come Go with Me, but it's still enjoyable."

== Track listing ==
No.	Title	Writer(s)	Length
1.	"Heaven Only Knows"	Leroy Bell, Casey James	3:29
2.	"Take It On Up"	Kevin Barnes, Louis Satterfield, Robert Wright, Verdine White	3:14
3.	"Tell Me Why"	James Burke, Keni Burke	4:21
4.	"Got to Find My Way"	Al McKinney, Gary Grainger, Satterfield, Wright, White	3:34
5.	"Happy for Love"	Wright, White	4:50
6.	"Funk It Over"	Dorian Holley, Pockets, Wright, White	3:55
7.	"You and Only You"	Ray Parker Jr.	3:43
8.	"Sphinx"	Grainger	1:55
9.	"Lay Your Head (On My Shoulder)"	Allee Willis, Wright, White	5:48
10.	"In Your Eyes"	Jacob Shaffer, Larry Jacobs, Wright, White	2:22
