= The Phenix Horns =

Horn section of Earth, Wind & Fire

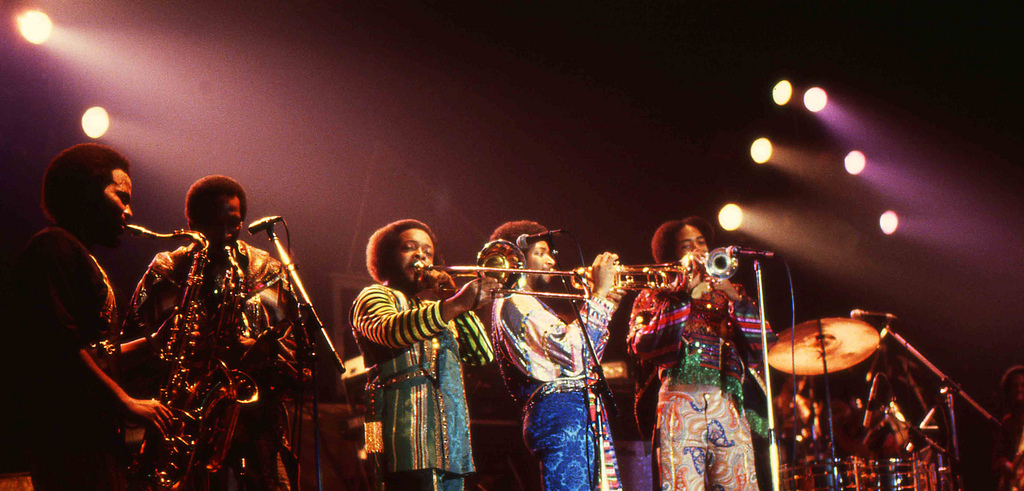
- The Phenix Horns in 1982. L–R: Andrew Woolfolk on tenor saxophone, Don Myrick on alto saxophone, Louis Satterfield on trombone, Michael Harris on trumpet and Rahmlee Michael Davis on trumpet.

Background information
- Also known as: EWF Horns
- Origin: Chicago, Illinois, U.S.
- Genres: Funk; pop; soul; R&B
- Labels: ARC; Columbia
- Past members: Don Myrick († 1993); Louis Satterfield († 2004); Rahmlee Michael Davis; Michael Harris; Elmer Brown; Harry Kim († 2026)
- Website: thephenixhorns.com

The Phenix Horns, originally known as the EWF Horns, were the main horn section for the band Earth, Wind & Fire. The horn section was composed of Don Myrick on saxophone, Louis "Lui Lui" Satterfield on trombone, Rahmlee Michael Davis on trumpet, Michael Harris on trumpet and Harry Kim on trumpet.

The Phenix Horns are also known for their work with Phil Collins and the band Genesis. They have also performed with other artists, such as the Chi-Lites, Ramsey Lewis, Deniece Williams and the Emotions.

The horn section should not be confused with the Earth, Wind & Fire Horns, which were established in 1987.

== History ==
=== The Pharaohs ===
Don Myrick, Louis Satterfield, and Rahmlee Michael Davis recorded in the early 1970s with the formation the Pharaohs, from which two albums have been re-issued on CD: The Awakening, recorded in 1971, and a live album, In the Basement, recorded in 1972.

=== Formation ===
Maurice White met trombonist and bassist Louis Satterfield while performing at Chicago's Chess Studios. At that time Satterfield was working at Chess as a musician, where he played on hit songs such as Fontella Bass's "Rescue Me." The duo later collaborated as part of the Pharaohs. After leaving Chess to play in the Ramsey Lewis Trio, White went on to start up a band known as Earth, Wind & Fire. He eventually expanded the band's sound to include a horn section called the Phenix Horns. Two of Satterfield's bandmates from the Pharaohs, saxophonist Don Myrick and trumpeter Rahmlee Michael Davis, joined the horn section, along with trumpeter Michael Harris.

It was Harris' control and precision in the instrument's upper register that helped define the section's sound. The group was less beholden to middle register three and four-part harmonies (the trademark of Chicago's Lee Loughnane, Walter Parazaider, and Jimmy Pankow), instead favoring a more staccato, rhythmic, borderline percussive approach similar to the sound being popularized by trumpeter/arranger Greg Adams in Tower Of Power (though notably excluding the contrapuntal baritone saxophone spits favored by Adams). This sound was ideally suited for White's increasingly dance-oriented songs. Examples are 1974's "Mighty Mighty" from Open Our Eyes and "September", which prominently features a fast-moving unison line played in three octaves (Satterfield in the lower octave, Myrick and Davis doubling in the middle octave, and Harris in the upper octave).

Myrick was also developing a distinctive solo voice. Though Ronnie Laws and later Andrew Woolfolk, Laws' replacement, were intended to play the featured instrumentalist role in the band's live shows, Myrick eventually won over some of those duties for himself.

1979 saw the arrival and almost immediate departure of trumpeter Elmer Brown, who plays lead trumpet in the 1979 live concerts in Rotterdam, Netherlands, and Budokan, Japan.

=== Collaboration with Phil Collins ===
In 1981, the foursome joined Genesis drummer Phil Collins and producer Hugh Padgham in the studio for the recording of Collins' debut solo album, Face Value. Five of the album's 12 tracks featured horns, with a sixth (a rendition of the Beatles' "Tomorrow Never Knows") featuring electronically manipulated samples of the section. Myrick's alto playing is featured on "If Leaving Me Is Easy", as are Harris' and Davis' signature flugelhorn lines. The section also joined Genesis at Fisher Lane Farm Studios, in Surrey, England, on the song "No Reply at All" on their album Abacab, as well as on "Paperlate", a song from the band's EP 3×3 which was also included on the US release of the album Three Sides Live.

The foursome developed a strong kinship with Collins and elected to join him on tour and for the recording of subsequent albums, while still intermittently performing and recording with Earth, Wind & Fire. 1982's Hello, I Must Be Going! saw a feature instrumental piece, "The West Side," penned for Myrick by Collins. Prior to 1989 Collins did not use dedicated backing vocalists in his live band, relying instead on instrumentalists. While guitarist Daryl Stuermer and bassists Mo Foster and Leland Sklar sing sporadically, the horn section sings and plays percussion on virtually every song that does not feature horns. During the extended intro to "Hand In Hand", the foursome join Collins at the front of the stage for a vocal call and response. Harris also contributed a brief co-lead vocal on the closing number, a rendition of the Isley Brothers's "It's Alright". Myrick is seen playing a sax solo at the end of Collins's video for "One More Night".

Following the 1985–86 tour, Harris departed the group and was replaced by Harry Kim. The horn section saw a diminished role in the live show. Collins began employing backing vocalists and occasionally dedicated percussionists. Following the 1990 live album/video Serious Hits… Live! Myrick also departed, largely due to continued struggles with drug addiction. He was replaced by erstwhile EWF co-saxophonist Andrew Woolfolk. By the time of the recording of 1996's Dance into the Light, the Phenix Horns had dissolved. They were replaced by the Vine Street Horns, featuring Phenix Horns replacements Woolfolk and Kim along with 2nd trumpet Daniel Fornero and trombonist Arturo Velasco.

In 2000, Collins sued two members of the Phenix Horns, Louis Satterfield and Rahmlee Davis, to recover overpayment of royalties over 6.5 years. Due to an accounting error, Satterfield and Davis had been paid a 0.5% royalty for their contributions to the Serious Hits... Live! album while Collins' management contended that the pair should have been paid only for their contributions on five tracks of the 15-track album. The court ruled in favor of Collins but awarded only half of the $384,000 he sought. Satterfield and Davis were not required to pay back any money already paid out, and the $192,000 damages were to be paid from future royalties.

== Breakup of the group ==
Band leader Don Myrick was shot to death in his home by a Santa Monica Police Department officer who mistook a grill lighter for a weapon. Myrick is buried in the Inglewood Park Cemetery in Inglewood, Los Angeles, across the street from the Forum, former home of the Los Angeles Lakers. Phil Collins wrote the song "For a Friend" as a tribute to Myrick, which was released on the single "We Wait and We Wonder" (1994). Louis Satterfield returned to performing until his death in September 2004.

Rahmlee Michael Davis ultimately resumed a career as a solo jazz artist and occasional sideman/session player. Kim and Woolfolk did session work with Fornero and Velasco under the Vine Street Horns moniker. Ronnie Laws performs primarily as a solo jazz artist. Michael Harris has toured with the Al McKay All Stars, performing classic Earth, Wind & Fire hits.
