= Come Go with Us =

Studio album by Pockets
- Released: 1977
- Genres: R&B; soul
- Label: Columbia
- Producer: Verdine White

Pockets chronology
Come Go with Us (1977)	Take It On Up (1978)

Professional ratings
Review scores
Source	Rating
AllMusic	4/5 stars

Come Go with Us is the debut album by R&B band Pockets released in 1977 by Columbia Records. The album reached No. 17 on the Billboard Top Soul Albums chart.

== Overview ==
Th track, "Come Go with Me" peaked at No. 17 on the Billboard Hot R&B Singles chart and No. 32 on the Disco chart.

== Track listing ==
No.	Title	Writer(s)	Length
1.	"Come Go with Me"	Al McKinney, Robert Wright, Verdine White	4:22
2.	"Pasado"	Clarence Burke, James Burke, Ricardo Marrero	5:42
3.	"One Day at a Time"	Robert Wright, Verdine White	5:33
4.	"Doin' The Do"	Gary Grainger	2:58
5.	"In the Pocket"	Al McKinney, Kevin Barnes, Robert Wright, Verdine White	3:51
6.	"Nothing is Stronger"	Al McKinney, G. Stekler, Jacob Sheffer, Robert Wright, Verdine White	4:00
7.	"Elusive Lady"	Al McKinney, Kevin Barnes	6:58
8.	"Wizzard Wuzzit"	Gary Grainger	2:35

== Personnel ==
- Jacob Sheffer - guitar, percussion, vocals
- Gary Grainger - bass
- Al McKinney - keyboards, vocals
- George Gray - drums, percussion, vocals
- Larry Jacobs - percussion, vocals
- Kevin Barnes - trombone, percussion, vocals
- Irving Madison - saxophone, percussion, vocals
- Charles Williams - trumpet, percussion, vocals

=== Additional players on select tracks ===
- Andrew Smith Jr., Gary Grant, Steve Madaio - trumpet
- George Bohanon, Louis Satterfield - trombone
- Assa Drori, Rosemary McLean - cello
- Arnold Belnick, Charles Veal Jr., Dorothy Wade, Israel Baker, Janice Gower - violin
- Denyse Buffum, Kenneth Yerke, Paul Polivnick, Rollice Dale - viola
- Don Myrick - woodwind
- Tom Tom 84 (Thomas Washington) - arrangements
