= Take It On Up =

Take It On Up may refer to:

- Take It On Up (song), a 1978 single by Pockets
- Take It On Up (album), a 1978 album by Pockets
