= So Delicious (song) =

Single by Pockets

from the album So Delicious
- B-side: "La La (Means I Love You)"
- Released: October 1979
- Genre: Soul
- Length: 3:59
- Label: ARC 1-11121
- Songwriter(s): Verdine White, Robert Wright, Charles Fearing, Fred White
- Producer(s): Verdine White, Robert Wright; Arranger: Jerry Hey

Pockets singles chronology
""Catch Me""	"So Delicious"

So Delicious was a hit for the Baltimore soul/funk group Pockets. It was the 3rd hit for the group which had previously had hits with "Come Go With Me" and "Take It On Up".

== Background ==
The song was backed with a cover of the Delfonics 1968 hit "La-La (Means I Love You)". It appeared on the B side of their album So Delicious which was released in August 1979 on the Arc label. The single, like the album was a joint co-production by Verdine White, and Robert Wright. The arrangements were handled by Jerry Hey.

== Charts ==
The song was a recommended Top Single Pick in the November 3, 1979, issue of Billboard. The song was their third hit. It peaked at No 34 during an 11-week chart run on the R&B singles chart.
