= The Awakening (The Pharaohs album) =

Awakening

Studio album by The Pharaohs
- Released: 1971
- Studio: RCA Studios, Chicago
- Genre: Jazz
- Length: 39:12
- Label: Luv N' Haight
- Producer: E. Rodney Jones, Hillery Johnson, The Pharaohs

The Pharaohs chronology
Awakening (1971)	In the Basement (1996)

Professional ratings
Review scores
Source	Rating
Allmusic	4.5/5 stars
DownBeat	4/5 stars
Jazz Times	(favourable)

Awakening is an album by The Pharaohs which was originally released in 1971 on Scarab Records, Chicago. It was reissued by Luv N' Haight Records in 1996.

== Track listing ==
1. "Damballa" (Louis Satterfield) 7:50
2. "Ibo" (Oye Bisi Nalls, Fred Walker) 3:43
3. "Tracks of My Tears" (Smokey Robinson, Pete Moore, Marv Tarplin) 3:45
4. "Black Enuff" (Pharaoh Don "Hippmo") 2:55
5. "Somebody's Been Sleeping" (Lamont Dozier, Brian Holland) 3:30
6. "Freedom Road" (Pharaoh Ki) 5:15
7. "Great House" (Pharaoh Don "Hippmo", Pharaoh Ki) 12:14

== Personnel ==
- Pharaoh Don "Hippmo" (Don Myrick) - alto, tenor and baritone saxophones, flute, cowbell
- Pharaoh Black Herman - alto saxophone, quinto drum
- Pharaoh Ki (Charles Handy) - trumpet, backing vocals, flugelhorn, alto horn, African shawm, percussion
- Pharaoh (Big) Willie Woods (Willie Woods) - trombone, bassoon, baritone horn, big black drum
- Pharaoh Aaron Ifah Dodd (Aaron Dodd) - tuba, baritone horn, tambourine
- Pharaoh Yehudah Ben Israel (Yackov Ben Israel) - guitars, lead vocals
- Pharaoh Ealee Satterfield (Louis Satterfield) - bass, backing vocals, cowbell
- Pharaoh Alious (Alious C. Watkins, Jr.) - drums, tumba
- Pharaoh Derf Reklaw Raheem (Fred Walker) - African drums, backing vocals, tumba, flute, congas, cowbell
- Pharaoh Shango Njoko - African drums, backing vocals, tumba
- Pharaoh Oye Bisi (Oye Bis Nalls) - African drums, cowbells, congas, tambourine
