= So Delicious =

So Delicious may refer to:

- "So Delicious" (song), by Pockets, 1979
- So Delicious, a 2015 album by the Reverend Peyton's Big Damn Band
- "So Delicious", a 2023 song by the Celebs
- So Delicious, a vegan dessert and beverage company owned by Danone North America

== See also ==
- It's So Delicious, a 1983 album by Starpoint
