= Pockets (band) =

American band

- Also known as: The Pockets
- Origin: Baltimore, Maryland, United States
- Genres: Soul, funk
- Years active: 1970s to 1980s, 2016 to present
- Labels: Columbia, ARC Records
- Past members: Kevin Barnes; Gary Grainger; Glenn Grainger; George Gray; Larry Jacobs; Irving Madison; Al McKinney; Jacob Sheffer; Charles Williams
- Website: https://www.pocketsband.net

Pockets are an American R&B band. They had three top 40 R&B hits in the late 1970s. They are best known for their single "Come Go With Me".

== History ==
The Baltimore based band was firstly dubbed the Pockets by singer Luther Ingram as a description of their musical style. As a septet the band went on to record several demos at Sheffield Studios in 1975. Being mostly top 40 covers and four original songs these records didn't make much of an impact. With this being so band member Al McKinney eventually met up with John Mackey of the Baltimore Colts. Mackey happened to be Verdine White's next-door neighbor and thus a cassette of the group was passed along to White who became impressed. White went on to bring in Larry Jacobs from San Francisco to be the group's lead vocalist. As an eight-man band the Pockets got signed in 1977 to Columbia Records. The group then started recording their first album which was being produced by White.

Entitled Come Go with Us, the Pockets' debut LP was issued in October 1977 by Columbia. Come Go with Us reached No. 17 on the Billboard Top R&B Albums chart. The album's lead single "Come Go with Me" peaked at No. 17 and No. 32 on the Billboard Hot R&B Singles and Disco Action charts, respectively.

The Pockets' second album, Take It On Up, was released in 1978 on Columbia Records. The LP was executively produced by Maurice White with Verdine White and Robert Wright also serving as producers. The album reached No. 22 on the Billboard R&B Albums chart. The LP's title track reached No. 24 on the Billboard R&B singles chart.

"So Delicious" gave the group their third top 40 R&B single, reaching No. 34. Lower charting singles include "Catch Me" (No. 69 R&B) and "Happy for Love" (No. 79 Disco/Dance).

The band eventually reformed and along with another classic R&B act Breakwater went about a tour of the United Kingdom in 2016 and 2017.

== Members ==
=== Original lineup ===
- Kevin Barnes - trombone, vocals, percussion
- Gary Grainger - bass, vocals
- Gregory Grainger - percussionist, vocals, aux drummer
- George Gray - drums, vocals, percussion
- Larry Jacobs - vocals, percussion
- Albert McKinney - keyboards, vocals
- Irving Madison - saxophone, vocals, percussion
- Jacob Sheffer - guitar, percussion
- Charles "Chuck" Williams - trumpet, flugelhorn, trombone, vocals, percussion

=== 2016/2017 line up ===
- Craig Alsten
- Rick Aspel
- Greg Boyer
- Chris Fischer
- Gary Grainger
- Greg Grainger
- Freedom Imani
- Larry Jacobs
- Marshall Keyes
- Robert Wawa Legrand
- Edgar Montalvo
- David Ylvisaker
- Bryan Fox (Special guest)

== Discography ==
=== Albums ===
Year	Title	Billboard 200	US R&B	Label
1977	Come Go with Us	57	17	Columbia
1978	Take It On Up	85	22	Columbia
1979	So Delicious	—	43	Columbia
1996	Golden Classics	—	—	Collectables

=== Singles ===
Year	Title	US Hot 100	US R&B	Label
1978	"Come Go with Me"	84	17	Columbia
1978	"Pasado"	—	65	Columbia
1978	"Take It On Up"	—	24	Columbia
1979	"Happy for Love"	—	51	Columbia
1979	"Catch Me"	—	69	Columbia
1980	"So Delicious"	—	34	Columbia
