= Come Go with Me (Pockets song) =

Single by Pockets

from the album Come Go With Us
- B-side: "Wizzard Wuzzit"
- Released: October 1977
- Genre: Soul
- Length: 3:33
- Label: Columbia
- Songwriter(s): A. McKinney, V. White, R. Wright
- Producer(s): Verdine White

Pockets singles chronology
"Come Go with Me" (1977)	""Pasado"" (1978)

"Come Go with Me" is a song by R&B group Pockets, released as a single in 1977 by Columbia Records. It reached No. 17 on the Billboard Hot R&B Singles chart and No. 32 on the Dance/Club Play chart.

== Critical reception ==
Billboard described the song as having "a definite R&B feel, featuring horns and strings with an Earth Wind & Fire influence coming from its co-writer and producer Verdine White". AllMusic described the song as having "a progressive rhythm track" with "energized vocals" that's "filled with zest".

== Charts ==
Chart (1977)	Peak position
US Billboard Hot 100	84
US Billboard Hot R&B Singles	17
US Billboard Dance/Club Play	38

== Other versions ==
=== Remixes and re-edits ===
A remixed version of the song is featured on the album, Remixed With Love By Joey Negro, Vol. 2 by Joey Negro, which also features remixes of "I Love Music" by The O'Jays, "Love Ballad" by George Benson, and "Ride Like the Wind by Christopher Cross.

The song appears as well upon side 1 of Eli Escobar's Money Lotion #8 - Escobar Edits on Money Studies Records, with Colonel Abrahams "Trapped", and Loleatta Holloway's "Catch Me On The Rebound" on the record's flip side.

=== Covers ===
The Occasions featuring Tyrone Henry released a cover of the song in 1996 on the Feetmove record label.
