= Swamp Ophelia =

Studio album by Indigo Girls
- Released: May 10, 1994
- Recorded: 1994
- Studio: Woodland (Nashville, Tennessee); Triclops Recording (Atlanta, Georgia); A Major (London, UK); Abbey Road (London, UK)
- Genre: Folk rock
- Length: 46:53
- Label: Epic
- Producer: Peter Collins (for Jill Music, Inc.) with Indigo Girls

Indigo Girls chronology
Rites of Passage (1992)	Swamp Ophelia (1994)	4.5: The Best of the Indigo Girls (1995)

Singles from Swamp Ophelia
- 1. "Least Complicated"; 2. "Touch Me Fall"; 3. "Power of Two"

Professional ratings
Review scores
Source	Rating
AllMusic	3/5 stars
Chicago Tribune	2/4 stars
Entertainment Weekly	B−
The Music Box	4/5 stars
Rolling Stone	4/5 stars

Swamp Ophelia is the fifth studio album by the Indigo Girls, released in 1994.

== Track listing ==
No.	Title	Writer(s)	Length
1.	"Fugitive"	Amy Ray	4:37
2.	"Least Complicated"	Emily Saliers	4:12
3.	"Language or the Kiss"	Saliers	5:35
4.	"Reunion"	Ray	3:27
5.	"Power of Two"	Saliers	5:22
6.	"Touch Me Fall"	Ray	6:11
7.	"The Wood Song"	Saliers	4:13
8.	"Mystery"	Saliers	4:04
9.	"Dead Man's Hill"	Ray	4:43
10.	"Fare Thee Well"	Saliers	4:01
11.	"This Train Revised"	Ray	4:38

== Personnel ==
Indigo Girls

- Amy Ray - vocals, acoustic and electric guitar (lead on Fugitive, rhythm elsewhere)
- Emily Saliers - vocals, acoustic, classical and electric guitar (rhythm and lead), bouzouki

Musicians

- Jerry Marotta - drums (all except 10 & 11), percussion, bongos, African drums, marimba
- Sara Lee - bass (all except 9–11)
- Michael Lorant - drums (11), guest/backing vocals (1, 2, 4, 8, 11)
- Jan Dykes - bass (6, 11)
- Danny Thompson - acoustic bass (4, 5, 7, 8)
- Tony Levin - Chapman stick (9)
- Chuck Leavell - piano (1, 3, 5), chimes (1)
- John Mark Painter - baritone guitar (1), flugelhorn (1, 5, 6), accordion (2), string arrangement (6, 11), electric guitar (11)
- Mike Batt - string and woodwind arrangement, conductor on "The Wood Song"
- Connie Grauer - melodica, bass synthesizer (9)
- Kim Zick - triangle, snare, tom tom, timpani (9)
- Lisa Germano - penny whistle (1), mandolin (1, 4, 5), violin (4, 7, 8)
- Jane Scarpantoni, Anthony Lamarchina - cello
- Jo-El Sonnier - accordion (2)
- Bill Newton - chromatic harmonica (5)
- James Hall - trumpet (1, 6)
- David Davidson, Sheila Doyle, Christian Teal - violin
- Kristin Wilkinson - viola
- Jane Siberry (3), The Roches (4, 8), Sam "Shake" Anderson (5), Larry Ray Sr. (9) - backing vocals

== Reception ==
The Allmusic review noted that "Amy Ray and Emily Saliers continue to hone their signature lush melodies .... The Indigo Girls are no longer afraid to hit upon past relationships and personal emotion. Saliers and Ray's incredible harmonies are most stylish .... [b]ut the duo also move beyond the sweet and tender by dipping into darker realms .... This album is another humanistic effort from the Indigo Girls' deep and indwelling passions and ideas."

In 2015, the Indigo Girls were invited by Justin Vernon of Bon Iver to perform Swamp Ophelia in its entirety at the inaugural Eaux Claires festival, which Vernon founded. Vernon has written that Swamp Ophelia was one of his sister Kim's favorite albums, and after she urged him to listen to it, it became one of his as well.

== Commercial performance ==
The album debuted at number nine on the US Billboard 200 and it spent 26 weeks on the chart. It was certified Platinum in the Us with sales of 1 million copies.

== Covers ==
David Crosby covered "Fare Thee Well" on the B-side to his 1993 single Hero.

The British mother-and-daughter folk duo Chris and Kellie While covered "Power of Two" on their self-titled 2004 album.

In 2009, Michael Feinstein covered "Power of Two" in his nightclub act and studio album The Power of Two with Cheyenne Jackson, using the song's title for both the album and act as well.

In 2010, Filipino pop rock singer Aiza Seguerra also covered the song. In 2012, Filipino acoustic pop singer Nyoy Volante and his acoustic band, "Rhythmic Circle" also covered the song on the OPM pop compilation album 90's Music Comes Alive.
