= After the Rain (Muddy Waters album) =

Studio album by Muddy Waters
- Released: May 12, 1969
- Recorded: January 1969
- Genre: Electric blues
- Length: 39:11
- Label: Cadet LPS 320
- Producer: Marshall Chess, Charles Stepney, Gene Barge

Muddy Waters chronology
Electric Mud (1968)	After the Rain (1969)	Fathers and Sons (1969)

After the Rain is the sixth studio album by Muddy Waters. It is the follow-up to the previous year's Electric Mud, and shares many of the same musicians. Unlike Electric Mud, After the Rain contained mostly Waters's own compositions; the songs, while still distorted, are less overtly psychedelic.

== Background ==
This album serves as a sequel to Electric Mud (1968), a previous release that was regarded as controversial. Players such as Phil Upchurch, Pete Cosey, Charles Stepney, Louis Satterfield, and Morris Jennings continued their participation. Unlike the previous album, however, Waters's own guitar playing is also prominently featured. Among Waters's original compositions, "Bottom of the Sea" is included exclusively on this album.

== Reception ==
Professional ratings
Review scores
Source	Rating
AllMusic	3.5/5 stars

In terms of sales, the album did not achieve the same level of success as its predecessor Electric Mud, failing to chart on the Billboard 200. Bruce Eder of AllMusic awarded the album 3.5 out of 5 stars, commenting in comparison to Electric Mud that "simply put, it is more Muddy Waters-like." A 2007 mini-review by CD Journal described the first half as being driven by the rock-oriented spirit carried over from the previous album, while noting that the latter half fully showcases bottleneck slide guitar and places the music firmly at the forefront of Chicago blues.

== Releases ==
On September 13, 2011, Get On Down Records digitally remastered and reissued the album on compact disc and vinyl. On November 22, 2011, After the Rain and Electric Mud were combined and reissued on a single disc by BGO Records.

== Track listing ==
No.	Title	Writer(s)	Length
1.	"I Am the Blues"	Willie Dixon	4:36
2.	"Ramblin' Mind"	McKinley Morganfield	4:44
3.	"Rollin' and Tumblin'"	McKinley Morganfield	4:47
4.	"Bottom of the Sea"	McKinley Morganfield	5:21
5.	"Honey Bee"	McKinley Morganfield	4:14
6.	"Blues and Trouble"	McKinley Morganfield	4:20
7.	"Hurtin' Soul"	Charles Williams	4:35
8.	"Screamin' and Cryin'"	McKinley Morganfield	4:59
Total length:			39:11

== Personnel ==
Musicians

- Muddy Waters – vocals, lead guitar tracks 3, 5, 6 & 8
- Phil Upchurch – guitar
- Morris Jennings – drums
- Otis Spann – piano
- Louis Satterfield – bass
- Pete Cosey – guitar
- Charles Stepney – organ
- Paul Oscher – harmonica

Production

- Stu Black – Engineer
- T.T. Swan – Re-mix production
- Marshall Chess – Production
- Charles Stepney – Production
- Gene Barge – Production
