= Everyday (Phil Collins song) =

1994 single by Phil Collins

- One of artwork variants

Single by Phil Collins

from the album Both Sides
- B-side: "Don't Call Me Ashley"; "Doesn't Anybody Stay Together Anymore" (live)
- Released: 3 January 1994
- Length: 5:43 (album version); 4:53 (radio edit)
- Label: Virgin
- Songwriter: Phil Collins
- Producer: Phil Collins

Phil Collins singles chronology
"Both Sides of the Story" (1993)	"Everyday" (1994)	"We Wait and We Wonder" (1994)

Music video
- "Phil Collins - Everyday (Official Music Video) [LP Version]" on YouTube

"Everyday" is a song written, produced and performed by English musician Phil Collins, released in January 1994, by Virgin Records, as the second single of his fifth studio album, Both Sides (1993). The single achieved success mostly in North America in early 1994 and its accompanying music video was directed by Jim Yukich, depicting Collins moving out of a New York City apartment. In 2004, "Everyday" was included as the seventh track on Collins' compilation album Love Songs: A Compilation... Old and New.

== Release ==
In Phil Collins' native UK, "Everyday" stalled outside the top 10 of the UK Singles Chart, peaking at number 15. In the United States, "Everyday" reached number 24 on the Billboard Hot 100 and peaked at number two on the Billboard Adult Contemporary chart. On the latter listing, the song finished 1994 as the most successful adult contemporary song. In Canada, "Everyday" reached number eight on the RPM 100 Hit Tracks chart and peaked atop the Adult Contemporary Tracks ranking on 18 April 1994. It ended 1994 as Canada's 59th-most-successful single and fourth-most-successful adult contemporary song. Elsewhere, the single reached number 17 in Iceland and Israel, and entered the top 40 in Flanders, Germany, Ireland, and the Netherlands.

== Critical reception ==
Larry Flick from Billboard magazine wrote, "Already making friends at AC radio, second single from Collins' Both Sides set is a familiar pop ballad, rife with lyrics and musical passages that have resided in past hits. Far easier to peg for top 40 play than his disappointing previous single, 'Everyday' should meet with a more welcoming response on all levels." Alan Jones from Music Week gave the song a score of four out of five and named it the "gentle highlight" from Collins' album, noting that it "has a low-key charm—plus non-album bonus tracks—to make it a substantial hit." Pan-European magazine Music & Media wrote, "'Who's sad?' The piano intro on the album version has been edited away on this minimalist and depressive ballad with chilly synthesiser and restrained drums."

== Music video ==
The song's music video, directed by Jim Yukich, features Collins moving out of a New York City luxury apartment he (presumably) shared with the person he's addressing in the song. Inside the apartment all of the items are covered and ready for the movers, and the walls are bare white. Collins' record label did not promote the single heavily, resulting in the video receiving minimal airplay on MTV and VH1, just as same as his previous single, "Both Sides of the Story."

== Track listings ==
- UK CD single
1. "Everyday"
2. "Don't Call Me Ashley"
3. "Everyday" (early demo)
- UK CD single (with calendar)
- European maxi-CD single
1. "Everyday"
2. "Don't Call Me Ashley"
3. "Everyday" (early demo)
4. "Doesn't Anybody Stay Together Anymore" (live)
- UK 7-inch and cassette single
- European and Australian CD single
- US cassette single
1. "Everyday"
2. "Don't Call Me Ashley"
- US maxi-CD single
1. "Everyday"
2. "Don't Call Me Ashley"
3. "Everyday" (early demo)
4. "Hang in Long Enough" (live)
5. "Hand in Hand" (live)
- Japanese mini-CD single
1. "Everyday" (edit)
2. "Doesn't Anybody Stay Together Anymore" (live)

== Charts ==
=== Weekly charts ===
Chart (1994)	Peak position
Australia (ARIA)	66
Belgium (Ultratop 50 Flanders)	26
Canada Top Singles (RPM)	8
Canada Adult Contemporary (RPM)	1
Europe (Eurochart Hot 100)	25
Europe (European Hit Radio)	2
France (SNEP)	44
Germany (GfK)	35
Iceland (Íslenski Listinn Topp 40)	17
Ireland (IRMA)	26
Israel (Israeli Singles Chart)	17
Netherlands (Dutch Top 40)	37
Netherlands (Single Top 100)	28
UK Singles (Official Charts)	15
UK Airplay (Music Week)	5
US Billboard Hot 100	24
US Adult Contemporary (Billboard)	2
US Pop Airplay (Billboard)	32

=== Year-end charts ===
Chart (1994)	Position
Canada Top Singles (RPM)	59
Canada Adult Contemporary (RPM)	4
Europe (European Hit Radio)	23
US Billboard Hot 100	86
US Adult Contemporary (Billboard)	1

== Release history ==
Region	Date	Format(s)	Label(s)	Ref.
United Kingdom	3 January 1994	7-inch vinyl; CD; cassette	Virgin	
United Kingdom	10 January 1994	CD (with calendar)	Virgin	
Australia	10 January 1994	CD; cassette	WEA	
Japan	25 January 1994	Mini-CD	WEA	
