= Electric Mud =

Studio album by Muddy Waters
- Released: October 1968
- Recorded: May 1968
- Studio: Ter Mar, Chicago
- Genre: Electric blues; blues rock; psychedelic rock
- Length: 36:42
- Label: Cadet/Chess
- Producer: Marshall Chess; Charles Stepney; Gene Barge

Muddy Waters chronology
The Super Super Blues Band (1968)	Electric Mud (1968)	After the Rain (1969)

Electric Mud is the fifth studio album by Muddy Waters, with members of Rotary Connection playing as his backing band. Released in 1968, it presents Muddy Waters as a psychedelic musician. Producer Marshall Chess suggested that Muddy Waters record it in an attempt to appeal to a rock audience.

The album peaked at number 127 on Billboard 200 album chart. It was controversial for its fusion of electric blues with psychedelic elements.

== History ==
The 1960s saw Marshall Chess seeking to introduce Muddy Waters' music to a younger audience; Chess Records, Waters' record label, founded by Marshall's father, Leonard Chess, released a series of compilation albums of Muddy Waters' older music repackaged with psychedelic artwork.

In 1967, Marshall Chess formed Cadet Concept Records as a subsidiary of Chess Records. The label's first release was the self-titled debut album of Rotary Connection, a psychedelic band.

The next project Chess conceived was Electric Mud, a psychedelic rock concept album; Marshall later stated, "I came up with the idea of Electric Mud to help Muddy make money. It wasn't to bastardize the blues. It was like a painting, and Muddy was going to be in the painting. It wasn't to change his sound, it was a way to get it to that market."

Electric Mud was recorded with members of the Rotary Connection, alongside a similar psychedelic concept recording by Howlin' Wolf. Chess hoped the new albums would sell well among fans of psychedelic rock bands influenced by these singers. According to Muddy Waters, "Quite naturally, I like a good-selling record. I was looking at it because I played for so many of these so-called hippies that I thought probably I could reach them."

== Production ==
To provide the psychedelic sound Chess sought for the album, he assembled "the hottest, most avant garde jazz rock guys in Chicago": Gene Barge, Pete Cosey, Roland Faulkner, Morris Jennings, Louis Satterfield, Charles Stepney and Phil Upchurch. According to one account of the album's recording, Cosey, Upchurch and Jennings joked about calling the group "The Electric Niggers". According to Marshall Chess, "We were going to call them the Electric Niggers, but my dad wouldn't let me."

The album incorporates use of wah-wah pedal and fuzzbox. Marshall Chess augmented the rhythm of Muddy Waters' live band with the use of electronic organ and saxophone. According to Marshall Chess, "It was never an attempt to make Muddy Waters a psychedelic artist; it was a concept album like David Bowie being Ziggy Stardust." Muddy Waters said of the album's sound, "That guitar sounds just like a cat – meow – and the drums have a loping, busy beat."

"I'm Your Hoochie Coochie Man" incorporates free jazz influences, with Gene Barge performing a concert harp. Muddy Waters performs the vocals of "Let's Spend the Night Together", a cover of the Rolling Stones' 1967 single, in gospel-soul style with heavy influence from Cream's “Sunshine of Your Love.”

The track "She's All Right" interpolates The Temptations' "My Girl".

According to Buddy Guy, "[Muddy Waters couldn't] feel this psychedelic stuff at all ... and if the feeling is gone, that's it. You can't get too busy behind a singer. You've got to let him sing it." Muddy Waters' previous albums replicated the sound of his live performances. Working with a studio band rather than his own was problematic for Muddy Waters, who could not perform material from the album live. He stated "What the hell do you have a record for if you can't play the first time it's out? I'm so sick of that ... If you've got to have big amplifiers and wah-wahs and equipment to make you guitar say different things, well, hell, you can't play no blues."

The title of the album did not refer to the use of electric guitar, as Muddy Waters had played the instrument since he first signed with Chess Records. The use of the term "electric" is used in a psychedelic context.

== Release ==
Electric Mud was released in 1968 with a simple black and white cover that did not make it obvious that the music on the album was psychedelic. The album's inner spread featured photographs of Muddy Waters having his hair processed at a beauty parlor.

On November 19, 1996, the album was reissued on compact disc by Chess Records. On November 22, 2011, Electric Mud and After the Rain were combined on a single compact disc by BGO Records. A new vinyl edition was released by Third Man Records in November 2017.

== Reception ==
Professional ratings
Review scores
Source	Rating
AllMusic	1.5/5 stars
The Penguin Guide to Blues Recordings	2/4 stars

Electric Mud sold 150,000 copies within the first six weeks of release. Peaking at number 127 on Billboard magazine's Billboard 200 album chart, it was Muddy Waters' first album to appear on the Billboard and Cash Box charts. However, among critics and blues purists, Electric Mud is Waters' "most polarizing record", according to Waters biographer Robert Gordon.

Blues purists criticized the album's psychedelic sound. In a Rolling Stone feature, Pete Welding wrote, "Electric Mud does great disservice to one of the blues' most important innovators, and prostitutes the contemporary styles to which his pioneering efforts have led." Although American critics panned the album, it was better received in England. According to Marshall Chess, "It was the biggest Muddy Waters record we ever had at Chess, and it dropped instantly. The English accepted it; they are more eccentric."

== Impact, influence and legacy ==
Muddy Waters recorded After the Rain the following year, incorporating elements of the sound of Electric Mud. According to Cosey, "I'll never forget, as soon as I walked into the studio for the follow-up and Muddy saw me, he threw his arms around me, said 'Hey, how you doing, boy, play some of that stuff you played on that last album.'"

While blues purists criticized the album, Cosey learned from Jimi Hendrix's valet that Hendrix would listen to "Herbert Harper's Free Press News" from the album for inspiration before performing live.

Waters later claimed that he disliked the album and its sound, and that he did not consider the album to be blues. He stated, "Every time I go into Chess, [they] put some un-blues players with me [...] If you change my sound, then you gonna change the whole man." In the biography The Mojo Man, Muddy Waters stated "That Electric Mud record was dogshit. But when it came out, it started selling like wild, but then they started sending them back. They said, 'This can't be Muddy Waters with all this shit going on, all this wha-wha and fuzztone.'" AllMusic reviewer Richie Unterberger panned the album as being "crass".

However, the album has attracted new admirers among the hip-hop scene; in Lost in the Grooves: Scram's Capricious Guide to the Music You Missed, Gene Sculatti wrote that "The rhythm seems to anticipate hip-hop by three decades." Rapper Chuck D said of the album, "to me it's a brilliant record. I've played it about a thousand times. The voice and character of Muddy Waters stand above the new music. Muddy's vocals project. That's what created a hook for me to get into it: these vocals are actually pulling the music." Chuck D stated that he had been introduced to Electric Mud by a member of Public Enemy, which sparked an interest in Muddy Waters' earlier work, and in roots-oriented blues. Chuck D explained, "It took me a while to warm up to traditional blues. A whole new world. But the automatic thing that struck me right away was the Electric Mud thing." The documentary series The Blues, produced by Martin Scorsese, depicts the recording band for Electric Mud performing with Chuck D and members of The Roots.

== Track listing ==
The original LP record cover listed the track times in seconds only.

Side A
No.	Title	Writer(s)	Length
1.	"I Just Want to Make Love to You"	Willie Dixon	4:24
2.	"I'm Your Hoochie Coochie Man"	Dixon	4:48
3.	"Let's Spend the Night Together"	Mick Jagger, Keith Richards	3:17
4.	"She's All Right"	McKinley Morganfield a.k.a. Muddy Waters	6:32
Total length:			19:03

Side B
No.	Title	Writer(s)	Length
5.	"I'm a Man (Mannish Boy)"	Morganfield	3:21
6.	"Herbert Harper's Free Press News"	Sidney Barnes, Robert Thurston	4:32
7.	"Tom Cat"	Charles Williams	4:02
8.	"Same Thing"	Dixon	5:44
Total length:			17:39

== Personnel ==
Musicians

- Muddy Waters – vocals
- Gene Barge – tenor saxophone, producer
- Phil Upchurch – guitars
- Roland Faulkner – guitars
- Pete Cosey – guitars
- Charles Stepney – organ, arranger, producer
- Louis Satterfield – bass guitar
- Morris Jennings – drums

Additional personnel

- Stu Black – engineer
- Marshall Chess – producer
- Meire Murakami – design
- Bill Sharpe – cover design
- Abner Spector – mixing
- Vartan – art direction

== Chart positions ==
Chart (1968)	Peak Position
Pop Albums	127

== See also ==
- The Howlin' Wolf Album
