= The Howlin' Wolf Album =

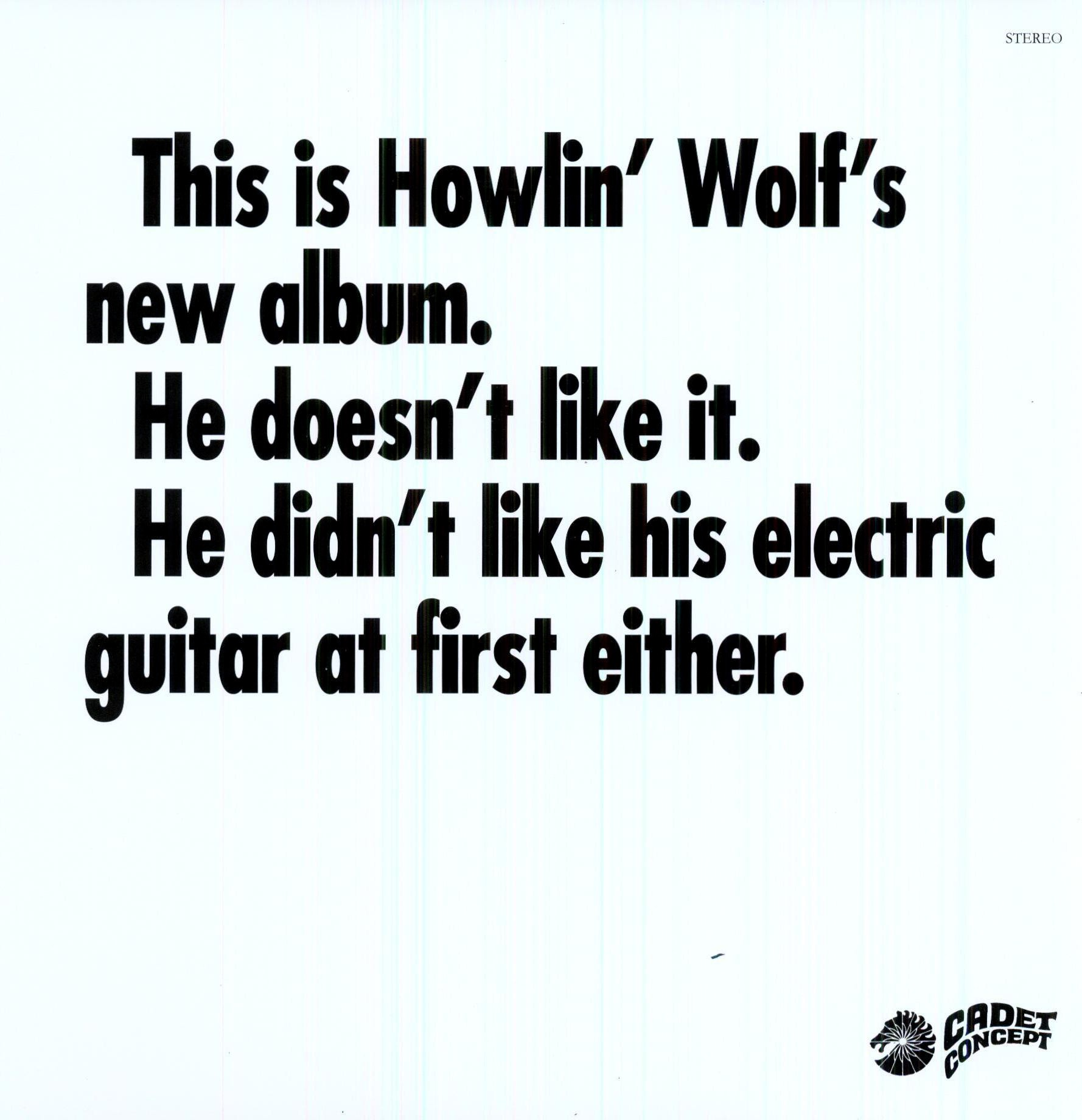

Studio album by Howlin' Wolf
- Released: 1969
- Recorded: November 1968
- Genre: Blues; psychedelic rock
- Length: 40:59
- Label: Cadet Concept/Chess
- Producer: Marshall Chess; Charles Stepney; Gene Barge

Howlin' Wolf chronology
The Super Super Blues Band (1968)	The Howlin' Wolf Album (1969)	Message to the Young (1970)

The Howlin' Wolf Album is a studio album by Howlin' Wolf, released in 1969. It features members of Rotary Connection as his backing band. The album mixed blues with psychedelic rock arrangements of several of Wolf's classic songs. Howlin' Wolf strongly disliked the album, which is noted on the album's cover art. The album peaked at number 69 on Billboard magazine's "Black Albums" chart.

== Production ==
In 1967, Marshall Chess formed Cadet Concept Records as a subsidiary of Chess Records. The label's first release was the self-titled debut album of the psychedelic band Rotary Connection, whose members Chess described as "the hottest, most avant garde rock guys in Chicago". As a result of the album's success, Chess felt that he could revive the career of bluesmen Muddy Waters and Howlin' Wolf by recording two albums of experimental, psychedelic blues with members of Rotary Connection as the backing band for the singers, producing the albums Electric Mud and The Howlin' Wolf Album. Chess hoped the new albums would sell well among fans of psychedelic rock bands influenced by Muddy Waters and Howlin' Wolf.

In place of Howlin' Wolf's regular musicians were Gene Barge, Pete Cosey, Roland Faulkner, Morris Jennings, Louis Satterfield, Charles Stepney and Phil Upchurch. Cosey, Upchurch and Jennings joked about calling the group "The Electric Niggers". Marshall Chess liked the suggestion, but Leonard Chess refused to allow the name.

The album incorporates use of wah-wah pedal and fuzzbox. Marshall Chess augmented the rhythm of Howlin Wolf's live band with the use of electronic organ and saxophone. Blues purists criticized the album's psychedelic sound. Howlin' Wolf disliked the sound, which he did not consider to be blues. According to guitarist Pete Cosey, during the recording sessions, Howlin' Wolf "looked at me and he said 'Why don't you take them wah-wahs and all that other shit and go throw it off in the lake – on your way to the barber shop?'"

== Release and reception ==
Professional ratings
Review scores
Source	Rating
AllMusic	2/5 stars
The Rolling Stone Album Guide	1/5 stars

Marshall Chess referred to Howlin' Wolf's dislike of the arrangements on the album's cover. Howlin' Wolf took exception to the blurb, as he had enthusiastically adopted the use of electric guitar, and had led the first entirely electric blues combo in West Memphis in the early 1950s. Howlin' Wolf stated that the album was "dog shit". According to Chess, the album's cover hurt its sales. Chess states that "I used negativity in the title, and it was a big lesson: You can't say on the cover that the artist didn't like the album. It didn't really sell that well. But it was just an attempt. They were just experiments."

The Howlin' Wolf Album did not sell as well as Electric Mud. The Howlin' Wolf Album peaked at number 69 on Billboard magazine's Black Albums chart. The album's single, "Evil", peaked at number 43 on the R&B Singles chart.

In 2007, a digitally remastered compact disc edition was released as a limited edition in Japan. Because of an error in remastering, the CD version cut 34 seconds from the last song, "Back-Door Man". Instead of a fade out, the song ends abruptly at 6:31. On March 22, 2011, Get On Down Records reissued the CD in the US with the same mastering error. The reason for the error is that the printed time for "Back-Door Man" printed on the back cover is 6:17, but this excludes the spoken intro. The correct timing for the full song with the spoken intro is 6:51. The album has never been released on CD in its complete form.

The singer Bilal names it among his 25 favorite albums. In 1998 The Wire included the album in a list of groundbreaking albums, where Sasha Frere-Jones wrote of how Chess' wish to put "the greatest shouter of all time" against an electric band to recut several of his early hits unusually resulted in a group that "was capable of outdoing both Funkadelic and The Meters at their own game, and unafraid to get very foreground and doubly black." He wrote that the same group's albums with Muddy Waters "came close to the majesty" of The Howlin' Wolf Album, but that ultimately "there's no topping Howlin's polytonal bellow. Combine that voice with the rhythm and noise here and you have evidence of the greatest rock group that never was."

== Track listing ==
Titles, writer's credits, and running times are taken from the original Cadet LP record cover and may differ from other releases.

All tracks written by Willie Dixon, except "Smokestack Lightning" and "Moanin' at Midnight", written by Howlin' Wolf.

Side 1
No.	Title	Length
1.	"Spoonful"	3:48
2.	"Tail Dragger"	4:20
3.	"Smokestack Lightning"	3:54
4.	"Moanin' at Midnight"	3:13
5.	"Built for Comfort"	5:07
Total length:		20:49

Side 2
No.	Title	Length
6.	"The Red Rooster"	3:48
7.	"Evil"	4:06
8.	"Down in the Bottom"	2:43
9.	"Three Hundred Pounds of Joy"	2:34
10.	"Back Door Man"	6:51
Total length:		20:09

== Personnel ==
- Howlin' Wolf – guitar, harmonica, vocals
- Gene Barge – horn, electric saxophone
- Pete Cosey – guitar, bowed guitar
- Hubert Sumlin – guitar
- Roland Faulkner – guitar
- Morris Jennings – drums
- Don Myrick – flute
- Louis Satterfield – bass guitar
- Phil Upchurch – bass, guitar

Technical

- Ron Malo – recording engineer
- Jeff Leowenthal – photography

== Chart positions ==
Chart (1969)	Peak Position
Black Albums	49

== See also ==
- Electric Mud
