= Both Sides of the Story =

1993 single by Phil Collins

- One of artwork variants, also used for the parent album

Single by Phil Collins

from the album Both Sides
- B-side: "Always"; "Rad Dudeski"
- Released: 18 October 1993
- Length: 6:43 (album version); 5:31 (radio edit)
- Label: Virgin
- Songwriter: Phil Collins
- Producer: Phil Collins

Phil Collins singles chronology
"Hero" (1993)	"Both Sides of the Story" (1993)	"Everyday" (1994)

Music video
- "Both Sides of the Story" on YouTube

"Both Sides of the Story" is a song performed by English singer-songwriter, drummer, actor and lead singer of English rock band Genesis, Phil Collins. The song was released in October 1993 by Virgin Records as the lead single from his fifth album, Both Sides (1993). The song reached number seven on the UK Singles Chart, and numbers 25 and 20 on the US Billboard Hot 100 and Cash Box Top 100. It charted the highest in Canada, peaking at number two on the RPM 100 Hit Tracks chart. The single's B-sides vary, as copies of the single include either "Always" or "Rad Dudeski".

== Critical reception ==
Larry Flick from Billboard magazine characterised "Both Sides of the Story" as a "rumbling, midtempo pop/rocker" with a "prominent, almost militaristic beat" that was "fleshed out with subtle guitar licks and contrasting keyboard lines that are by turns pillowy and reedy". He called "Both Sides of the Story" "one of Collins' stronger lyrical efforts in some time." Troy J. Augusto from Cashbox believed that the song carried a strong resemblance to Collins' work with Genesis, saying "it's difficult to tell the difference between Collins' solo work and music by Genesis, the progressive British trio that he's fronted since the late '70s, and never more so than on this majestic song which reminds one of the band's recent output."

== Music video ==
The accompanying music video for "Both Sides of the Story", mainly shot in New York, follows the lyrics of the song. The first section cuts between Collins singing and images of a gutter and homeless people. The second section shows Collins inside a house, sitting on the stairs. He watches a married couple arguing, while their children watch. After the chorus, a military unit is shown patrolling a town in Northern Ireland while children spray-paint IRA on the walls. The final section portrays the story of a confrontation with a ghetto kid threatening another man with a gun. (This scene was inspired by the 1991 Lawrence Kasdan film Grand Canyon.) The video ends with shots of New York and the people, cutting like the first section, again with Collins singing the closing lyrics.

== Charts ==
=== Weekly charts ===
Chart (1993–1995)	Peak position
Australia (ARIA)	41
Austria (Ö3 Austria Top 40)	22
Belgium (Ultratop 50 Flanders)	7
Canada Top Singles (RPM)	2
Canada Adult Contemporary (RPM)	7
Europe (Eurochart Hot 100)	11
Europe (European Hit Radio)	1
Finland (Suomen virallinen lista)	13
France (SNEP)	30
Germany (GfK)	12
Iceland (Íslenski Listinn Topp 40)	27
Ireland (IRMA)	21
Italy (Musica e dischi)	6
Netherlands (Dutch Top 40)	9
Netherlands (Single Top 100)	8
Peru (UPI)	8
Sweden (Sverigetopplistan)	31
Switzerland (Schweizer Hitparade)	11
UK Singles (Official Charts)	7
UK Airplay (Music Week)	2
US Billboard Hot 100	25
US Adult Contemporary (Billboard)	10
US Mainstream Rock (Billboard)	24
US Pop Airplay (Billboard)	8
US Cash Box Top 100	20
Zimbabwe (ZIMA)	7

=== Year-end charts ===
Chart (1993)	Position
Canada Top Singles (RPM)	55
Canada Adult Contemporary (RPM)	75
Europe (Eurochart Hot 100)	90
Netherlands (Dutch Top 40)	92
UK Airplay (Music Week)	41

Chart (1994)	Position
Canada Top Singles (RPM)	29
Canada Adult Contemporary (RPM)	79

== Release history ==
Region	Date	Format(s)	Label(s)	Ref.
United Kingdom	18 October 1993	7-inch vinyl; CD1; cassette	Virgin	
United Kingdom	25 October 1993	CD2	Virgin	
Australia	25 October 1993	CD; cassette	WEA	
Japan	28 November 1993	Mini-CD	WEA	
