= We Wait and We Wonder =

1994 single by Phil Collins

- Standard artwork

Single by Phil Collins

from the album Both Sides
- B-side: "Hero" (demo)
- Released: 25 April 1994
- Length: 7:01 (album version); 5:48 (single version)
- Label: Virgin
- Songwriter: Phil Collins
- Producer: Phil Collins

Phil Collins singles chronology
"Everyday" (1994)	"We Wait and We Wonder" (1994)	"Somewhere" (1996)

Music video
- "Phil Collins - We Wait And We Wonder (Official Music Video)" on YouTube

"We Wait and We Wonder" is a song by English musician Phil Collins from his fifth solo album, Both Sides (1993). Written and produced by Collins, the song was released as the album's third and final single in April 1994, by Virgin Records. The single reached number 45 on the UK Singles Chart but failed to appear on the US Billboard Hot 100. Its accompanying music video was directed by Jim Yukich and filmed in London, England. One of the UK B-sides, "Hero", originally appeared on American singer David Crosby's album Thousand Roads, with Collins singing backing vocals. The version on the "We Wait and We Wonder" single is a demo featuring only Collins on vocal.

== Background and lyrics ==
The early 1990s saw a high scale of terrorism witnessed within Britain, inspiring Collins to write about how someone lives under such circumstances.

"To the outsider it seems that we in Britain live daily under the cloud of terrorism. That familiarity sometimes makes you think of it as almost normal, then suddenly something will happen..." - Sleeve note from the album.

In the press kit for the album, Collins explained that the song was an attack on both sides of the Irish Troubles—the terrorists and the government—for not being able to find a resolution, and that it was specifically inspired by the Warrington bombings. "It's just asking, 'What does it take to work this out?' How much further are we going to let it escalate? I don't pretend to have the answers. But when I see a mother and two children blown to bits by a bomb, I think this just can't go on....It's an emotional song, as much as a political one. I look at it as a simple sentiment from an ordinary person, an angry statement. I write these songs not in a bid to change things, because I don't really believe that I can change things to that extent, but it's really just to say 'This bothers me - does it bother anyone else?'"

== Critical reception ==
Larry Flick from Billboard magazine named the song a "thought-provoking pearl" from the album, writing, "This is easily some of his best material to date, and it is executed with a deliciously textured arrangement of urgent drums, ringing guitars, and jarring bagpipes. Collins overflows with passion and energy that hopefully will prove contagious with programmers." Troy J. Augusto from Cash Box named it Pick of the Week, commenting, "Collins' latest Atlantic collection, Both Sides, may be near the bottom of the album chart these days, but that doesn't mean that the record is devoid of any good music. As proof, look no further than 'We Wait & We Wonder', just released as the title's third single. This one ranks as one of Phil's best efforts, both from a songwriting point of view—the solid arrangement and crafty hook will result in summer-long airplay for the song—and a delivery standpoint, as Collins comes through with all the drama and passion that have made his greatest songs so memorable. And the big, Sears-sponsored tour starts soon." Pan-European magazine Music & Media noted, "One of the few songs off the Both Sides album with a beat to it, although this doesn't change his depressive mood. The tone remains sad, fortified by Celtic overtones via synths in bagpipe mode."

== Music video ==
The music video for "We Wait and We Wonder" was directed by Jim Yukich and filmed in London. Paul Flattery and Elizabeth Flowers produced, and Tony Mitchell directed photography on the video. It features Collins and touring band members performing the song on the Both Sides stage set-up. The song is shortened down from the album length. The second song on the album, "Can't Turn Back the Years" featured the same set and idea for its video but did not receive an official single release.

== Live performances ==
As well as being performed during the entirety of the 1994–1995 tour promoting the album, "We Wait and We Wonder" was also performed as an encore/extra song during the 2005 leg of the First Final Farewell Tour.

== Track listings ==
UK CD1

1. "We Wait and We Wonder" – 5:48
2. "Take Me with You" – 5:24
3. "Stevies Blues" ("There's a Place for Us" instrumental) – 6:49

UK CD2

1. "We Wait and We Wonder" – 7:00
2. "For a Friend" – 6:04
3. "Hero" (demo) – 4:45

== Credits ==
- Phil Collins – vocals, keyboards, guitars, bass, drums, percussion, bagpipes

== Charts ==
Chart (1994)	Peak position
Belgium (Ultratop 50 Flanders)	38
Canada Top Singles (RPM)	43
Europe (European Hit Radio)	8
Germany (GfK)	52
Iceland (Íslenski Listinn Topp 40)	23
Netherlands (Single Top 100)	36
UK Singles (Official Charts)	45
UK Airplay (Music Week)	12

== Release history ==
Region	Date	Format(s)	Label(s)	Ref.
United Kingdom	25 April 1994	7-inch vinyl; CD1; cassette	Virgin	
United Kingdom	2 May 1994	CD2	Virgin	
Australia	9 May 1994	CD; cassette	WEA	
