= In the Basement =

Live album by The Pharaohs
- Released: 1996
- Recorded: 1972
- Venue: The High Chaparral, Chicago, Illinois
- Genre: Jazz
- Length: 47:41
- Label: Luv N' Haight
- Producer: The Pharaohs, E. Rodney Jones, Hillery Johnson

Professional ratings
Review scores
Source	Rating
Allmusic	4/5 stars

In the Basement is a live album by The Pharaohs which was recorded in 1972 and released on the Luv N' Haight record label in 1996.

== Track listing ==
1. "In the Basement" [live] (The Pharaohs, Don Whitehead) 10:50
2. "People Make the World Go Round" [live] (Thom Bell, Linda Creed) 11:18
3. "African Roots" [live] (L. Brown, T. Brown) 7:57
4. "The Pharaohs Love Y'All" (Charles Handy, The Pharaohs, Louis Satterfield, Fred Walker) 5:09
5. "Drum Suite" [live] (Kewu Gogins Oya, Alfred Nalls, The Pharaohs, Fred Walker) 10:49
6. "Love and Happiness" (Al Green, Teenie Hodges) 3:01

== Personnel ==
The Pharaohs

- Sue "Sulanya" Conway - vocals
- Ealee Satterfield - bass, cowbell, vocals
- Don "Hippmo" - alto, tenor and baritone saxophone, flute cowbell
- Warren Bingham - guitar
- "Big" Willie Woods - trombone, baritone horns, Indian snake charmer flute
- Rahmlee Michael Davis - trumpet
- Shango Njoko Adefumi - African drums, congas, gong, vocals
- Oye Bisi Nalls - African drums, cowbell, congas, tambourine
- Kewu "Gogins" Oya - quinto drums, congas
- Derrick Morris - trap drums
