= Take It On Up (song) =

Single by Pockets

from the album Take It On Up
- B-side: "Sphinx"
- Released: May 1978
- Genre: Soul
- Length: 3:13
- Label: Columbia 3-10755
- Songwriter(s): K. Barnes, V. White, R. Wright, L. Satterfield
- Producer(s): Verdine White, Robert Wright

Pockets singles chronology
""Prasado ""	"Take It On Up"	""Happy For Love""

"Take It On Up" was a song by the band Pockets issued as a single in 1978 on Columbia Records. The single reached No. 24 on the Billboard Hot Soul Songs chart.

== Overview ==
The song was produced by Verdine White and Robert Wright. Take It On Up was composed by White, Wright, K. Barnes and Louis Satterfield. The song is also the title track of the Pockets' 1978 album Take It On Up

Take It On Up spent a sum of eight weeks upon the Billboard Hot Soul Songs chart.

== Critical reception ==
The Washington Post called Take It On Up "a snappy brass accented uplifter".
