= Hero (David Crosby song) =

1993 single by David Crosby

Single by David Crosby featuring Phil Collins

from the album Thousand Roads
- B-side: "Coverage"; "Fare Thee Well"
- Released: April 15, 1993
- Length: 4:39
- Label: Atlantic
- Songwriters: Phil Collins; David Crosby
- Producer: Phil Collins

David Crosby singles chronology
"Drive My Car" (1989)	"Hero" (1993)	"Radio" (2014)

Phil Collins singles chronology
"Who Said I Would" (1991)	"Hero" (1993)	"Both Sides of the Story" (1993)

Audio
- "Hero" on YouTube

"Hero" is a single performed by American singer-songwriter David Crosby from his third studio album, Thousand Roads (1993). The recording, released in April 1993 by Atlantic, features English drummer Phil Collins, who co-wrote the song with Crosby, produced it, sang backing vocals, and played drums, keyboards, and drum machine. Collins released a demo version, featuring his vocals only, as a B-side to the "We Wait and We Wonder" single release.

== Critical reception ==
Billboard described "Hero" as a "soft and pillowy rock ballad that focuses on the interesting chemistry of voices and introspective lyrics". Writing for Music Week, Alan Jones called the single a "nagging and pleasant AOR song". He also highlighted its "subdued vocals" and Collins' "trademark drum sound". Music & Media labeled "Hero" as a "monumental ballad".

== B-sides ==
"Coverage" is an album track written by Bonnie Hayes, a cover of a song she recorded for her 1982 album, Good Clean Fun. "Fare Thee Well" is a non-album track written by Emily Saliers, who later recorded the song with her band Indigo Girls for their 1994 album, Swamp Ophelia.

== Track listing ==
1. "Hero" (LP version) – 4:39
2. "Coverage" (LP version) – 3:22
3. "Fare Thee Well" – 4:07

== Charts ==
=== Weekly charts ===
Chart (1993)	Peak position
Australia (ARIA)	128
Canada Top Singles (RPM)	4
Canada Adult Contemporary (RPM)	1
Europe (European Hit Radio)	10
Germany (GfK)	51
New Zealand (Recorded Music NZ)	32
UK Singles (Official Charts)	56
UK Airplay (Music Week)	25
US Billboard Hot 100	44
US Adult Contemporary (Billboard)	3
US Cash Box Top 100	35

=== Year-end charts ===
Chart (1993)	Position
Canada Top Singles (RPM)	48
Canada Adult Contemporary (RPM)	22
US Adult Contemporary (Billboard)	21

== Release history ==
Region	Date	Format(s)	Label(s)	Ref.
United States	April 15, 1993	7-inch vinyl; CD; cassette	Atlantic	
United Kingdom	May 3, 1993	7-inch vinyl; CD; cassette	Atlantic	
Australia	June 14, 1993	CD; cassette	Atlantic	
