= The Pharaohs =

American soul/jazz/funk band

- Origin: Chicago, Illinois, United States
- Genres: Jazz, Soul, Funk
- Years active: 1962–1973, 1998
- Label: Ubiquity Records (current label)
- Spinoff of: The Jazzmen
- Past members: Charles Handy; Louis Satterfield; Don Myrick; Maurice White; Fred Humphrey; Ernest McCarthy "Big" Willie Woods; Oye Bisi; Shango Njoko Adefumi; Black Herman Waterford; Yehudah Ben Israel; Alious Watkins; Derf Reklaw Raheem; Aaron Dodd; Derrick Morris; Warren Bingham; Rahm Lee; Richard A. Peterson; Billy Brimfield "Kewu" Goggins; Ron Dennis; Calvin Mayfield; Master Henry Gibson

The Pharaohs, an American soul/jazz/funk group, were formed in 1962 out of a student band, The Jazzmen, at Crane Junior College in Chicago, Illinois. This early incarnation comprised Louis Satterfield on trombone, Charles Handy on trumpet, and Don Myrick on alto saxophone. They were joined by Fred Humphrey on piano, Ernest McCarthy on bass guitar and Maurice White on drums. Satterfield, White, and Handy were studio musicians at Chess Records in Chicago.

== Affro Arts Theater ==
On the South Side of Chicago the Affro Arts Theater offered concerts, as well as classes in music and dance. As the name suggests the theater represented the strong African-American nature of the area and the times. It was here that the Jazzmen merged with the Artistic Heritage Ensemble to form The Pharaohs.

== Albums ==
In 1971 the band recorded The Awakening, and in 1972 In the Basement. With cuts like "The Pharaohs Love Y'all" and "In the Basement", these albums established The Pharaohs as a force, if only on the cult level, for several years. Many Afro-Sheen commercials from this period featured music of the Pharaohs.

By the early 1970s, Maurice White had had some success with the Ramsey Lewis Trio and recorded a demo with several Chicago musicians. After signing with Warner Bros. Records he assembled the band which was to become Earth, Wind & Fire.

In 1998 the Pharaohs marked their 30th anniversary by performing at the Kansas City Blues-Jazz festival, releasing the performance on CD the next year. For this recording, the band included Charles L. Handy (trumpet, percussion, vocals), Big Willie Woods (trombone, percussion, vocals), Black Herman Waterford (alto and tenor saxophones, percussion), Billy Brimfield (trumpet), Yehuda Ben Israel (lead vocals, guitar), Louis Satterfield (bass guitar, vocals), "Kewu" Goggins (percussion), Ron Dennis (percussion), Calvin Mayfield (drums), and Master Henry Gibson (percussion, vocals).
