= Thousand Roads =

Studio album by David Crosby
- Released: May 4, 1993
- Recorded: July 1992–January 1993
- Studios: Groove Masters (Santa Monica, California); Sunset Sound (Los Angeles, California); Ocean Way Recording (Los Angeles, California); The Power Station (New York City, NY); Warnham Lodge Farm (West Sussex, UK); The Farm (Chiddingfold, UK)
- Genre: Rock
- Length: 47:30
- Label: Atlantic
- Producers: Phil Collins: Don Was; Dean Parks; David Crosby; Glyn Johns; Stephen Barncard; Phil Ramone

David Crosby chronology
Oh Yes I Can (1989)	Thousand Roads (1993)	It's All Coming Back to Me Now... (1995)

Professional ratings
Review scores
Source	Rating
AllMusic	3/5 stars
Robert Christgau	C−

Thousand Roads is the third solo studio album by the rock artist David Crosby, a founding member of Crosby, Stills, Nash & Young. It was released on May 4, 1993 on Atlantic Records. It was the last solo studio album from Crosby until Croz in 2014.

== Background ==
Thousand Roads is Crosby's first solo studio album in four years following the release of Oh Yes I Can in 1989. At the time, Crosby was resuming his musical career after a difficult period that included drug addiction, imprisonment, and health problems, and the album was regarded as an important milestone in his comeback. In a 1993 interview, Crosby said that he resumed an active performing schedule alongside the release of Thousand Roads, and the album was considered a work that marked a new beginning in his solo career.

== Recording ==
The album was recorded from July 1992 to January 1993 at several studios in the United States and the United Kingdom. Recording took place at Groove Masters in Santa Monica, California, Sunset Sound and Ocean Way Recording in Hollywood, Power Station in New York City, and Warnham Lodge Farm and The Farm Studio in West Sussex, England.

Thousand Roads was produced as a collaborative project involving several producers. Phil Collins co-wrote and produced the album's opening track, "Hero", while Don Was, Glyn Johns, Phil Ramone, Dean Parks, John Leventhal, and Stephen Van Kunk each handled production duties on various tracks. Crosby himself also participated in the production of several songs.

The album's songs were written by a variety of songwriters. In addition to "Hero", which was co-written with Collins, the album includes Jimmy Webb's "Too Young to Die", Marc Cohn's "Old Soldier", John Hiatt's "Through Your Hands", and Paul Brady's "Helpless Heart". "Yvette in English" was co-written by Crosby and Joni Mitchell, while the title track, "Thousand Roads", is the only song on the album written solely by Crosby.

The recording sessions featured numerous prominent musicians. Collins contributed drums, keyboards, percussion, and backing vocals, while Graham Nash provided harmonies and harmonica on several tracks. Other session musicians included Jackson Browne, Stephen Bishop, Bernie Leadon, Benmont Tench, Leland Sklar, Pino Palladino, Jeff Porcaro, Jim Keltner, and Russ Kunkel. In particular, "Too Young to Die" was dedicated to drummer Jeff Porcaro, who died shortly after the album's recording sessions were completed.

== Track listing ==
No.	Title	Writer(s)	Length
1.	"Hero" (featuring Phil Collins)	Phil Collins, David Crosby	4:39
2.	"Too Young to Die"	Jimmy Webb	5:45
3.	"Old Soldier"	Marc Cohn	4:58
4.	"Through Your Hands"	John Hiatt	4:33
5.	"Yvette in English"	Joni Mitchell, David Crosby	5:53
6.	"Thousand Roads"	David Crosby	4:31
7.	"Columbus"	Noel Brazil	4:26
8.	"Helpless Heart"	Paul Brady	4:18
9.	"Coverage"	Bonnie Hayes	3:22
10.	"Natalie"	Stephen Bishop	4:55

== B-sides ==
Song	Single	Writer
"Fare Thee Well"	"Hero"	Emily Saliers

== Personnel ==
- David Crosby – lead and backing vocals
- Phil Collins – keyboards (1), drums (1), percussion (1), backing vocals (1)
- Benmont Tench – keyboards (2)
- Jimmy Webb – acoustic piano (2)
- Marc Cohn – acoustic piano (3)
- Craig Doerge – keyboards (4, 8, 9), arrangements (9)
- C.J. Vanston – keyboards (4, 5, 8, 10)
- Paul Wickens – keyboards (7), accordion (7)
- Bonnie Hayes – keyboards (9)
- Jeff Pevar – guitars (1)
- Michael Landau – electric guitar (2)
- Bernie Leadon – electric guitar (2, 9), acoustic guitar (2, 4, 6–8)
- John Leventhal – guitars (3)
- Dean Parks – guitars (5, 10), flute (5)
- Andy Fairweather Low – electric guitar (6, 7)
- Ethan Johns – additional electric guitar (6), drums (6, 7), percussion (6, 7)
- Pino Palladino – bass (1)
- Leland Sklar – bass (2–5, 8–10)
- David Watkins Clarke – bass (6, 7)
- Jim Keltner – drums (2)
- Jeff Porcaro – drums (4, 8)
- Russ Kunkel – drums (9, 10)
- Paulinho da Costa – percussion (4, 8)
- Luis Conte – percussion (5)
- Jackson Browne – harmony vocals (2)
- Graham Nash – harmony vocals (2, 3), harmonica (3)
- Kipp Lennon – harmony vocals (4, 8, 9, 10)
- Stephen Bishop – harmony vocals (10)

Strings on "Helpless Heart"

- David Campbell – arrangements
- Armen Garabedian – concertmaster
- Suzie Katayama – contractor
- David Young – string bass
- Larry Corbett, Suzie Katayama and Daniel Smith – cello
- Scott Haupert, Maria Newman and Evan Wilson – viola
- Armen Garabedian, Berj Garabedian, Ruth Johnson and Dimitrie Levici – violin

== Production ==
- Executive Producer – Jan Crosby
- Producers – Phil Collins (Track 1); Don Was (Tracks 2, 4 & 8); David Crosby (Tracks 3, 5 & 9); John Leventhal (Track 3); Dean Parks (Track 5); Glyn Johns (Tracks 6 & 7); Phil Ramone (Track 10).
- Co-Producers – Nick Davis (Track 1); Stephen Barncard (Track 9).
- Engineers – Nick Davis (Track 1); Rob Eaton (guitar overdub, Track 1); Rik Pekkonen (Tracks 2, 4 & 8); Paul Dieter (Tracks 3, 5 & 10); Glyn Johns (Tracks 6 & 7); Stephen Barncard and Ed Goodreau (Track 9).
- Assistant Engineers – Simon Metcalfe (Track 1); Dan Bosworth (Tracks 2, 4 & 8); Steve Onsuka (Track 5); Bob Salcedo (Tracks 5 & 10); Mike Kloster (Track 9).
- Mastered by Doug Sax at The Mastering Lab (Hollywood, CA).
- Art Direction – Graham Nash
- Cover Art – R. Mac Holbert
- Photography – Guido Harari
