= Don Myrick =

American saxophonist (1940–1993)

- Myrick performing in 1982

Background information
- Born: Donald Myrick; April 6, 1940; Chicago, Illinois, U.S
- Died: July 30, 1993 (aged 53) Los Angeles, California, U.S
- Genres: Blues; soul; jazz; pop; rock; R&B; funk
- Occupation: Musician
- Instrument: Saxophone
- Years active: 1960s–1990s
- Formerly of: The Jazzmen; The Pharaohs; The Phenix Horns; Earth, Wind & Fire

Donald Myrick (April 6, 1940 – July 30, 1993) was an American saxophonist. A member of the Phenix Horns, he was best known for his work with Earth, Wind & Fire and Phil Collins.

He played alto, tenor, and soprano sax as a member of Earth, Wind & Fire's original horn section, the Phenix Horns, from 1975 through 1982. Previously, Myrick had been a member of the musical group the Pharaohs. Myrick is also credited as a founding member of the Association for the Advancement of Creative Musicians.

Some of his most famous saxophone solos include Phil Collins' "All of My Life", "If Leaving Me Is Easy", and "One More Night", the latter featuring Myrick performing the sax solo in the official music video, filmed in a London pub. Another was the live recording of "Reasons", featured on the Earth Wind & Fire Gratitude album, and "After the Love Has Gone", from the album I Am. He performed with many prominent musicians, including Grover Washington, Jr. and Carlos Santana. Myrick appeared on records by artists including Bobby "Blue" Bland, The Dells, Regina Belle, the Mighty Clouds of Joy, and Heaven 17.

Earth, Wind & Fire's single "Runnin'" earned him the 1977/78 Grammy Award for Best R&B Instrumental.

== Early life ==
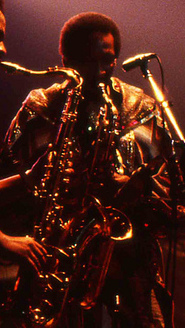
Don Myrick performing with Earth, Wind & Fire in 1982

Myrick attended Crane Junior College in Chicago, where he was part of a band called the Jazzmen with Louis Satterfield, who later joined him in the Phenix Horns, performing with Earth, Wind & Fire. Myrick and Satterfield played in the Pharaohs, with musicians from Chess Records, which included drummer Maurice White, who went on to found Earth, Wind & Fire.

== Death ==
Myrick was killed in Los Angeles, California by a Santa Monica police officer during a narcotics investigation. While attempting to serve a search warrant, police officer Gary Barbaro mistook a butane lighter in Myrick's hand for a weapon. He fired a single bullet that hit Myrick in the chest. Myrick died in the hospital shortly afterward, aged 53.

Following a funeral service at Bethany Baptist Church, his body was buried at Inglewood Park Cemetery in Los Angeles County.

Myrick was survived by his mother, Antoinette Myrick-Carr (now deceased), wife Barbara (now deceased), and three daughters: Shani, Lauren, Shirika Myrick, as well as a cousin, Elliot Myrick. In 1995, their wrongful death lawsuit against the city was settled for $400,000.

In 1994, Phil Collins released "For a Friend" as a B-side to "We Wait and We Wonder". The song describes the death of a male friend and includes Collins questioning what others knew and withheld.

As a tribute, Gary Bias performs the saxophone solos that originated with Myrick at Earth, Wind & Fire's live shows.

== Discography ==
With Howlin' Wolf

- The Howlin' Wolf Album (1969)

With Philip Cohran & The Artistic Heritage Ensemble

- The Malcolm X Memorial (A Tribute in Music) (1970)

With Donny Hathaway

- Everything Is Everything (1970)

With Odell Brown

- Free Delivery (1970)

With the Intentions

- Dig It / Blowing with the Wind – Single (1971)

With Jack McDuff

- The Heatin' System (1972)

With Terry Callier

- What Colour Is Love (1972)
- I Just Can't Help Myself (1973)

With Charles Bevel

- Meet "Mississippi Charles" Bevel (1973)

With Penny Goodwin

- Portrait of a Gemini (1974)

With Ramsey Lewis

- Sun Goddess (1974)

With Earth, Wind & Fire

- That's the Way of the World (1975)
- Gratitude (1975)
- Spirit (1976)
- All 'n All (1977)
- I Am (1979)
- Faces (1980)
- Raise! (1981)
- Powerlight (1983)
- The Eternal Dance (1992) – Compilation 3-CD boxset.
- The Essential Earth, Wind & Fire (2002) − Compilation
- Live in Rio (2002)
- The Essential Plus (2004) – Compilation 2 CD + DVD
- The Essential Earth, Wind & Fire (2008) – 3-CD Compilation limited edition

With the Emotions

- Flowers (1976)
- Rejoice (1977)
- Sunbeam (1978)
- Come into Our World (1979)
- New Affair (1981)

With Sky

- Sky (1979)

With Phil Collins

- Face Value ("Missed Again", "If Leaving Me Is Easy" 1981)
- Hello, I Must Be Going! ("I Cannot Believe It's True" 1982)
- Live at Perkins Palace (1983) – VHS video
- No Jacket Required ("One More Night", "Who Said I Would?", "Inside Out" 1985)
- No Ticket Required (1985) – VHS video
- ...But Seriously ("All of My Life" 1989)
- Serious Hits... Live! (1990)
- ...But Seriously, The Videos (1992) – VHS video
- ...Hits (1998)
- The Platinum Collection (2004) – 3-CD box set
- Love Songs: A Compilation... Old and New (2004)
- Hits Live 1990–1997 (2004) – DVD
- The Singles (2016)

With Frida

- Something's Going On (1982) – Album produced by Phil Collins, with Daryl Stuermer, Mo Foster, The Phenix Horns, etc.

With Philip Bailey

- The Wonders of His Love (1984) – Sax on I Will No Wise Cast You Out
- Chinese Wall (1984) – with Phil Collins, Nathan East, The Phenix Horns, etc.
- Chinese Wall / Inside Out (1988) – Double compilation album

With Heaven 17

- How Men Are (1984)
- "This Is Mine" (1984) – Single
- Pleasure One (1986)

With Shuybah

- Shuybah (1984)

With France Gall

- Le Tour de France (1988)

Various artists

- Knebworth (1990) – Plays with Phil Collins Band on Sussudio
- Live at Knebworth – Parts One, Two & Three (1990) – Plays with Phil Collins & The Serious Band on "In the Air Tonight" & "Sussudio" as well as with Genesis & The Serious Band on "Turn it on again Medley"
- El DeBarge – In the Storm (1991) Plays on the tracks, "Cry (Musical Interlude)", "Love Me Tonight", and "You Know What I Like"

== See also ==
- List of unarmed African Americans killed by law enforcement officers in the United States
