= Louis Satterfield =

American bassist and trombonist (1937–2004)

- Louis Satterfield in Pasadena, 1982

Background information
- Born: Louis Edward Satterfield; April 3, 1937; Shaw, Mississippi, U.S.
- Died: September 27, 2004 (aged 67) Chicago, Illinois, U.S.
- Genres: Blues; soul; jazz; pop; rock, R&B; funk
- Occupation: Musician
- Instruments: Bass; trombone; vocals
- Years active: 1971–2004

Louis Edward Satterfield (April 3, 1937 – September 27, 2004) was an American bassist and trombonist. Satterfield was a member of both the Pharaohs and the Phenix Horns. He also collaborated with prominent artists such as Earth, Wind & Fire, Muddy Waters, Phil Collins, B. B. King, the Emotions, Ramsey Lewis, the Whispers, and the Gap Band.

== Early life ==
Satterfield was born on April 3, 1937, in Shaw, Mississippi, a city in Bolivar and Sunflower counties, Mississippi, in the Mississippi Delta region.

== Career ==
In the late 1950s–early 1960s, Satterfield, Charles Handy on trumpet, and Don Myrick on alto saxophone formed the Jazzmen, a student jazz trio at Crane Junior College in Chicago, Illinois. They were backed by Fred Humphrey on piano, Ernest McCarthy on bass guitar, and Maurice White on drums. Satterfield as a session bassist, White, and Handy were studio musicians at Chess Records in Chicago. Satterfield most memorable contribution being the bassline to Fontella Bass's "Rescue Me" with White on drums. The Jazzmen collaborations and live concerts with Philip Cohran and the Artistic Heritage Ensemble at the Affro Arts Theater on the south side of Chicago went on to form the Pharaohs. In 1971, the band recorded its first and only studio album The Awakening, and in 1972 In the Basement, an album reissued by Luv N' Haight in November 1996 that features four tracks recorded live at High Chaparral in Chicago, a track from the original master tapes for The Awakening album, and "Love and Happiness", which was the B-side of "Freedom Road" single for Scarab Records. After leaving an early incarnation of the Pharaohs to play in the Ramsey Lewis Trio, White went on to start the band Earth, Wind & Fire. While at Chess Records, Satterfield was also teacher to up and coming electric bassists, most notably, White's younger brother Verdine White.

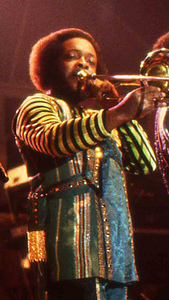
Louis Satterfield in 1982

The inception of the Phenix Horns, as the main horn section for Earth, Wind & Fire, originally known as the EWF Horns, came about in 1975 when White expanded the band's timbral palette to include more horns. At first the horn section included Satterfield and his bandmate from The Pharaohs, saxophonist Don Myrick along with lead trumpet player Michael Harris. They started touring with the band in 1975 and played on all EWF albums from 1975 until 1983. Satterfield and Earth, Wind & Fire bass player and Maurice White's younger brother Verdine White wrote a book, Playing the Bass Guitar, first published by Almo in 1978. 1979 saw the arrival of trumpeter Rahmlee Michael Davis for the recording of the album I Am. In 1981, the foursome joined Genesis drummer Phil Collins and producer Hugh Padgham in the studio for the recording of Collins's debut solo album, Face Value. Five of the musically diverse album's 12 tracks featured horns, with a sixth, a rendition of the Beatles' "Tomorrow Never Knows", featuring electronically manipulated samples of the section. The group's extreme precision was put to good use in up-tempo numbers like "Behind the Lines" and the mostly instrumental "Hand in Hand". The section also joined Collins's band Genesis on the song "No Reply at All" on their album Abacab, as well as on "Paperlate", a song from the band's EP 3×3, which was also included on the U.S. release of the album Three Sides Live.

The foursome developed a strong kinship with Collins and elected to join him on tour and for the recording of subsequent albums, while still performing and recording with EWF intermittently. Early concert footage shows the section doing considerably more than playing their instruments by singing and playing percussion on virtually every song that does not feature horns. During the extended intro to "Hand in Hand", the foursome join Collins at the front of the stage for a vocal call and response. Satterfield played baritone saxophone to brighten the section's sound for certain parts. Following the 1985–1986 tour, Michael Harris departed the group and was replaced by Harry Kim, and the horn section saw a diminished role in Collins' live shows. Following the 1990 live album and video Serious Hits... Live! Don Myrick also departed, largely due to continued struggles with drug addiction. Myrick was shot to death by a Santa Monica Police Department officer in the doorway of his home in 1993. He was replaced by erstwhile EWF co-saxophonist Andrew Woolfolk. By the time of the recording of 1996's Dance into the Light, the Phenix Horns had dissolved. They were replaced by the Vine Street Horns, featuring Phenix Horns replacements Woolfolk and Harry Kim along with 2nd trumpet Daniel Fornero, and trombonist Arturo Velasco.

Satterfield performed until his death on September 27, 2004, in Chicago. He was 67.

== Discography ==
Year	Album	Artist	Genre	Type	Label	Credit
1965	Soul Sounds	The 3 Souls	Soul	Studio	MCA	Electric bass
1967	Blues Is King	B.B. King	Blues, rock	Live	BluesWay, MCA	Bass
1967	Rotary Connection	Rotary Connection	Electronic, jazz, rock	Studio	Cadet, Chess, MCA	Bass
1967	Groovin' with the Soulful Strings	The Soulful Strings	Funk, soul	Studio	Cadet, Chess	Bass
1967	Mellow Yellow	Odell Brown & The Organ-izers	Blues, funk, soul, jazz, Latin	Studio	Chess	Bass
1967	The James Cotton Blues Band	The James Cotton Blues Band	Blues	Studio	Verve Forecast	Trombone
1968	Electric Mud	Muddy Waters	Blues	Studio	Cadet	Bass
1968	His Best - The Electric B.B. King	B.B. King	Blues	Compilation	MCA	Bass
1968	On the Beach	Philip Cohran and the Artistic Heritage Ensemble	Jazz	Studio	Zulu	Bass, trombone
1969	Upchurch	Phil Upchurch	Funk, soul, jazz	Studio	Cadet	Bass
1969	After the Rain	Muddy Waters	Blues	Studio	Cadet	Bass
1969	The Howlin' Wolf Album	Howlin' Wolf	Blues, rock	Studio	Cadet	Electric bass
1969	The Way I Feel	Upchurch, Phil	Studio	Cadet	Bass	
1970	Everything Is Everything	Donny Hathaway	Soul	Studio	Atco	Bass
1970	Free Delivery	Odell Brown	Funk, soul, jazz	Studio	Cadet	Bass
1971	Willie Dixon's Peace?	Willie Dixon	Blues	Studio	Yambo	Bass
1971	The Awakening	The Pharaohs	Funk, soul, jazz	Studio	Scarab	Bass, Cowbell, vocals, mixing
1972	Back in the Alley: The Classic Blues of B.B. King	B.B. King	Blues	Studio	Bluesway, MCA	Electric bass
1972	What Color Is Love	Terry Callier	Funk, soul	Studio	Cadet	Bass
1972	The Dells Sing Dionne Warwicke's Greatest Hits	The Dells	Funk, soul	Studio	Cadet	Bongos, congas
1972	The New Chicago Blues	Clarence Wheeler	Funk, soul	Studio	Atlantic	Electric bass
1973	I Just Can't Help Myself	Terry Callier	Funk, soul, jazz	Studio	Cadet	Bass
1973	Watch Out	Geoffrey Stoner	Folk, world, country, funk, soul	Studio	Ovation	Bass
1973	Catalyst	Willie Dixon	Blues	Studio	Ovation	Bass
1973	Crouching on the Outside	Shel Silverstein	Rock, folk, world, country	Compilation (2×LP)	Janus	Bass
1974	Chicken Heads	Mighty Joe Young	Blues, funk, soul	Studio (promo)	Ovation	Bass
1975	Gratitude	Earth, Wind & Fire	R&B, jazz	Live (2×LP)	Columbia, CBS	Trombone
1976	Flowers	The Emotions	R&B	Studio	Columbia	Trombone
1976	Mighty Joe Young	Mighty Joe Young	Blues	Compilation	Ovation	Bass
1976	Spirit	Earth, Wind & Fire	Funk, soul, jazz	Studio	Columbia, CBS	Trombone
1976	Moods and Grooves	Ju-Par Universal Orchestra	Funk, soul	Studio	Ju-Par	Bass
1976	Happy Being Lonely	The Chi-Lites	Funk, soul	Studio	Mercury	Trombone
1977	Rejoice	The Emotions	Soul	Studio	Columbia, CBS	Trombone
1977	Family Tree	The Staple Singers	Funk, soul	Studio	Warner Bros.	Trombone
1977	Just a Stone's Throw Away	Valerie Carter	Funk, soul, rock	Studio	Columbia, CBS	Bass
1977	For the First Time Out	Teresa Wiater	Funk, soul, pop	Studio	United Artists	Trombone
1977	Song Bird	Deniece Williams	R&B	Studio	Columbia, CBS	Trombone
1977	The Eugene Record	Eugene Record	Funk, soul	Studio	Warner Bros.	Horn
1977	The Gap Band	The Gap Band	Soul, funk	Studio	Tattoo	Horn
1977	Come Go With Us	Pockets	Funk, soul	Studio	Columbia, CBS	Trombone
1977	All 'n All	Earth, Wind & Fire	Electronic, funk, soul, pop, rock	Studio	Columbia, CBS	Trombone
1978	Closer to the Source	Leroy Hutson	Electronic, jazz	Studio	Curtom	Bass, horn
1978	Chanson	Chanson	Disco	Studio	Ariola	Horn
1978	Heaven and Earth	Heaven & Earth	Funk, soul	Studio	Mercury	Bass
1978	Music of the Sun	LaMont Johnson	Funk, soul	Studio	Tabu	Horn
1978	Sunbeam	The Emotions	R&B	Studio	Columbia	Trombone
1978	You Fooled Me	Grey and Hanks	Funk, soul	Studio	RCA Victor	Horn
1978	Trying to Get to You	Eugene Record	Funk, soul	Studio	Warner Bros.	Bass, trombone
1979	Bad for Me	Dee Dee Bridgewater	Disco	Studio	Elektra	Trombone
1979	I Am	Earth, Wind & Fire	Soul, disco, funk	Studio	CBS	Horn section, trombone
1979	The Changing of the Gard	Stargard	Funk, soul	Studio	Warner Bros.	Horn
1979	The Gap Band	The Gap Band	Soul, funk	Studio	Mercury	Horn
1979	Whisper in Your Ear	The Whispers	Soul, funk	Studio	S.O.L.A.R.	Trombone
1979	Sky	Sky	Soul, funk, jazz	Studio	EMI	Trombone, lead vocals, writer
1979	So Delicious	Pockets	Funk, soul	Studio	ARC, Columbia	Trombone
1979	Come into Our World	The Emotions	Electronic, funk, soul	Studio	ARC, Columbia, CBS	Trombone
1979	Welcome to My Fantasy	Eugene Record	Funk, soul	Studio	Warner Bros.	Saxophone
1980	Back for More	Al Johnson	Funk, soul	Studio	Columbia	Brass
1980	Faces	Earth, Wind & Fire	R&B	Studio	ARC, Columbia	Soloist, trombone
1980	La Toya Jackson	La Toya Jackson	Pop, dance, soul, R&B, disco	Studio	Polydor	Horn
1980	Routes	Ramsey Lewis	Soul, funk, jazz	Studio	Columbia, CBS	Trombone, musical assistance
1980	Celestial Sky	Starship Orchestra	Funk, soul	Studio	CBS	Trombone
1980	Love Uprising	Tavares	Funk, soul	Studio	Capitol	Trombone
1981	Face Value	Phil Collins	Pop, rock, R&B	Studio	Virgin, Atlantic	Trombone
1981	New Affair	The Emotions	Funk, soul	Studio	ARC	Trombone
1981	Tender Togetherness	Stanley Turrentine	Jazz	Studio	Elektra	Horns arrangements, trombone
1981	Raise!	Earth, Wind & Fire	Soul, R&B, funk	Studio	CBS	Trombone
1981	The Electric Collection	Ramsey Lewis	Jazz	Compilation	Columbia	Trombone
1981	Blues for the Night Owl	Ramsey Lewis	Jazz	Compilation	Columbia	Trombone
1981	Whatever Turns You On	The Dells	Funk, soul	Studio	20th Century Fox	Trombone
1981	Me and You	The Chi-Lites Featuring Eugene Record	Funk, soul	Studio	20th Century Fox	Trombone
1981	Endless Flight	Rodney Franklin	Funk, soul	Studio	Columbia	Horn
1981	This Kind of Lovin'	The Whispers	Funk, soul	Studio	RCA	Trombone
1982	Live at the Savoy	Ramsey Lewis	Jazz	Live	Columbia, CBS	Trombone
1982	Earland's Jam	Charles Earland	Jazz	Studio	CBS	Trombone
1982	Changes	Keni Burke	Studio	RCA	Electronic, funk, soul	Horn
1982	Something's Going On	Frida	Pop	Studio	Polar Music, Epic, Atlantic	Trombone
1982	Hello, I Must Be Going!	Phil Collins	Pop rock, soft rock	Studio	Virgin, Atlantic, WEA	Horn, trombone
1982	Weekend Fly to the Sun	Toshiki Kadomatsu	Funk, soul, pop, reggae	Studio (promo)	RCA	Trombone
1982	The Key to Your Heart	Superior Movement	Funk, soul	Studio	C.I.M.	Horn
1983	Earth, Wind & Fire: In Concert	Earth, Wind & Fire	Electronic, funk, soul, jazz	Video	Vestron	Bass, trombone
1983	Powerlight	Earth, Wind & Fire	R&B	Studio	Columbia	Trombone
1983	The Luxury Gap	Heaven 17	Synthpop	Studio	Virgin	Trombone
1983	MCB	MCB	Funk, soul	Studio	Epic	Trombone
1983	The Greatest Sides	Billy Stewart	Funk, soul	Compilation	Chess	Bass
1983	Live at Perkins Palace	Phil Collins	Rock, pop	Video	Picture Music International, Palace Benelux, EMI	Trombone
1983	Hot on a Thing	The Chi-Lites	R&B	Compilation	BR Music	Trombone
1984	My Rhythm	George Kranz	Electronic	Studio	Pool, Ariola	Trombone
1984	How Men Are	Heaven 17	Synthpop	Studio	Virgin	Trombone
1984	Chinese Wall	Philip Bailey	Pop, soul, rock	Studio	Columbia	Trombone
1984	His Greatest Sides	Little Milton	Blues	Compilation	Chess	Bass
1985	No Jacket Required	Phil Collins	Pop, rock	Studio	Virgin, Atlantic, WEA	Trombone
1985	Souljazzz	Rahmlee Michael Davis	Soul, jazz	Studio	Honest	Violin
1985	Between a Rock and a Hard Place	Australian Crawl	Rock	Studio	Freestyle	Trombone
1986	Pleasure One	Heaven 17	Synthpop	Stucio	Virgin	Trombone
1986	From Cotton with Verve	James Cotton	Blues	Compilation	Black Magic	Trombone
1987	Vini Pou	Kassav'	Zouk	Studio	Columbhia	Trombone
1988	The Best of Earth, Wind & Fire, Vol. 2	Earth, Wind & Fire	R&B	Compilation	Columbia	Trombone
1988	Le Tour De France	France Gall	Chanson	Live	Apache	Trombone
1988	The Best of Chess Rhythm & Blues Volume Two	Various artists	Funk, soul	Compilation	Chess	Bass, electric bass
1988	One More Time: The Chess Years	Billy Stewart	Funk, soul	Compilation	Chess	Electric bass
1989	...But Seriously	Phil Collins	Pop rock, soft rock	Studio	Virgin, Atlantic, WEA	Trombone
1989	Majestik Zouk	Kassav'	Zouk	Studio	Columbia, CBS	Trombone
1990	Serious Hits... Live!	Phil Collins	Pop, rock	Live	Virgin, Atlantic, WEA	Trombone
1990	Live at Knebworth	Various artists	Rock	Live (2×CD)	Eagle	Trombone
1990	Knebworth: The Album	Various artists	Rock	Live (2×CD)	Polydor	Trombone
1991	Music of Quality and Distinction Volume Two	British Electric Foundation	Electronic, funk, soul	Studio	Virgin	Trombone
1991	Milans	Jocelyne Béroard	Zouk	Studio	Columbia, CBS	Horn
1991	What It Takes: The Chess Years	Koko Taylor	Blues, funk, soul	Compilation	Chess	Bass
1991	Atlantic Rhythm & Blues 1947–1974	Various artists	R&B	Box set	Atlantic	Bass
1991	The Ballads	Earth, Wind & Fire	R&B	Compilation	Sony Music Distribution	Trombone
1992	The Best of Ronnie Laws	Ronnie Laws	Jazz	Compilation	Blue Note	Electric bass
1992	...But Seriously, The Videos	Phil Collins	Pop, rock	Video	Warner Music Vision	Trombone
1992	Chess Blues	Various artists	Blues	Compilation	Chess, MCA	Bass
1992	King of the Blues	B.B. King	Blues	Box set	MCA	Bass
1992	Din Daa Daa: The Album	George Kranz	Electronic, pop, rock	Compilation	Hot Productions	Trombone, trumpet
1992	None But the Righteous: Chess Gospel Greats	Various artists	Gospel	Compilation	Chess	Bass
1992	Rescued: The Best of Fontella Bass	Fontella Bass	R&B	Compilation	Chess, MCA	Bass
1992	Shake It All About	Little Richard	Rock and roll	Studio	Disney	Trombone
1992	The Eternal Dance	Earth, Wind & Fire	R&B	Box set	Columbia	Trombone
1994	3 Harp Boogie	James Cotton	Blues	Compilation	Tomato	Trombone
1994	Chess Rhythm & Roll	Various artists	R&B, pop, rock	Compilation	Chess	Bass
1994	Welcome to the Club: The Essential Chess Recordings	Little Milton	Blues, R&B	Compilation	Chess, MCA	Bass
1994	The Best of Gap Band	The Gap Band	Funk, soul	Compilation	PolyGram, Mercury, Chronicles	Horn
1995	Best of the Verve Years	James Cotton	Blues, pop, rock	Compilation	Verve	Trombone
1995	Dance Tracks	Earth, Wind & Fire	Dance	Compilation	TriStar Music	Trombone
1996	Best of My Love: The Best of the Emotions	The Emotions	R&B	Compilation	Columbia	Trombone
1996	Gonna Take a Miracle: The Best of Deniece Williams	Deniece Williams	R&B, pop, eocj, soul	Compilation	Sony Music Distribution	Trombone, trumpet
1996	The Best of Walter Jackson: Welcome Home - The OKeh Years	Walter Jackson	Soul	Compilation	Sony Music Distribution	Bass
1996	Elements of Love: Ballads	Earth, Wind & Fire	R&B	Compilation	Columbia	Trombone
1996	How Blue Can You Get? Classic Live Performances 1964 to 1994	B.B. King	Blues, R&B	Live compilation	MCA, Interscope	Bass
1996	Feelin' Good	James Cotton	Blues	Compilation	Eclipse	Trombone
1996	History of Chess Jazz	Various artists	Jazz	Compilation	Chess	Bass
1996	In the Basement	The Pharaohs	Funk, soul, jazz	Live	Luv N' Haight	Bass, Cowbell, vocals, mixeding
1997	It Only Takes a Minute: A Lifetime with Tavares	Tavares	R&B	Compilation	EMI, Capitol	Trombone
1997	Chess Blues Classics: 1957–1967	Various artists	Blues	Compilation	Chess	Bass
1997	This Is Jazz, Vol. 27	Ramsey Lewis	Jazz	Compilation	Sony	Trombone
1997	Greatest Hits (Chess 50th Anniversary Collection)	Little Milton	Blues, R&B	Compilation	Chess, MCA	Bass
1997	Chess Soul: A Decade of Chicago's Finest	Various artists	Soul	Compilation (2×CD)	Chess	Bass, guitar
1998	...Hits	Phil Collins	Pop, rock	Compilation	Face Value, Virgin, Atlantic, WEA	Trombone
1998	By George & Ira: Red Hot on Gershwin	Various artists	Jazz	Compilation	Verve	Bass
1998	Greatest Hits	Earth, Wind & Fire	R&B	Compilation	Legacy	Trombone
1998	I Think I Got the Blues	Willie Dixon	Blues	Studio	Prevue	Bass
1998	Leavin' the Plantation	Gashouse Dave	Pop, rock, blues	Studio	Terra Nova	Photography
1998	More Where that Came From: The Best of Leroy Hutson, Vol. 2	Leroy Hutson	R&B	Compilation	Deep Beats	Bass, Horn
1999	Essential Blues, Vol. 3	Various artists	Blues	Compilation (2×CD)	House of Blues	Bass
2000	20th Century Masters – The Millennium Collection: The Best of Billy Stewart	Billy Stewart	R&B	Compilation	Chess, MCA	Bass, electric bass
2000	Anthology	B.B. King	Blues, R&B	Compilation (2×CD)	MCA	Bass
2002	That's the Way of the World: Alive in 75	Earth, Wind & Fire	R&B	Live	Columbia	Percussion, trombone
2002	The Essential Earth, Wind & Fire	Earth, Wind & Fire	R&B	Compilation	Columbia	Flugelhorn, trombone
2002	Live in Rio	Earth, Wind & Fire	R&B	Live	Kalimba	Trombone
2003	Martin Scorsese Presents the Blues: Godfathers and Sons	Various artists	Blues, R&B	Compilation	Hip-O	Bass
2004	Chicago Soul	Various artists	Soul, blues, R&B	Compilation	Soul Jazz	Bass
2004	Love Songs	Earth, Wind & Fire	R&B	Compilation	Columbia	Trombone
2004	The Platinum Collection	Phil Collins	Pop, pop rock	Box set	Virgin	Trombone
2004	Hits Live 1990/1997	Phil Collins	Rock	Live compilation (CD+DVD)	WEA	Trombone
2004	Anthology: Sound+Vision	B.B. King	Blues, R&B	Compilation, video (2×CD + DVD)	MCA, Geffen	Bass
2005	Chronicles: Live at the Regal / Blues Is King / Live in Cook County Jail	B.B. King	Blues, R&B	Live box set	MCA, Geffen	Bass
2005	Chess Northern Soul	Various artists	Funk, soul	Compilation	Chess	Bass
2006	Beautiful Ballads	Earth, Wind & Fire	R&B	Compilation	Columbia	Trombone
2006	Best of B.B. King	B.B. King	Blues	Compilation (3×CD)	Madacy	Bass
2007	The Malcolm X Memorial (A Tribute in Music); A 1968 recording at the Afro Arts Theater in Chicago of Philip Cohran's tribute to the life of Malcolm X. Originally self-released on LP in 1968, in an edition of 1000.	Philip Cohran and the Artistic Heritage Ensemble	Jazz	Live compilation	Mississippi	Bass
2007	Singles	Philip Cohran and the Artistic Heritage Ensemble	Jazz	Compilation	Midday Music	Bass
2008	Original Album Classics	Earth, Wind & Fire	R&B	Box set	Columbia, Sony	Trombone
2009	The Music of Earth, Wind & Fire	Earth, Wind & Fire	R&B	Box set	Columbia, Sony	Trombone
2009	Ultimate Blues	Various artists	Blues	Compilation	Decca	Electric bass
2011	The Columbia Masters	Earth, Wind & Fire	R&B	Box set	Sony	Trombone
2011	Unbelievable / Cross My Heart: Chess Recordings 1964–1969	Billy Stewart	Pop, rock, R&B	Compilation	Shout!, UMC	Bass
2011	Armageddon; Album conceived in 1958 and written down in 1963. This performance was recorded live at the Affro Arts Theatre, Chicago, on February 11, 1968.	Philip Cohran and the Artistic Heritage Ensemble	Funk, soul, jazz	Live compilation	Tizona	Bass
2012	Atlantic Soul Legends: 20 Original Albums from the Iconic Atlantic Label	Various artists	Soul	Box set	Rhino, Warner Bros.	Bass
2012	Ladies and Gentlemen… Mr. B.B. King	B.B. King	R&B, blues	Box set	Universal, Hip-O	Bass
2012	The Spanish Suite (Martina, Delores & Marguirite); Live performance at the Afro Arts Theatre, Chicago, in February 1968.	Philip Cohran and the Artistic Heritage Ensemble	Folk, world, country, jazz	Live compilation	Tizona	Bass

== Bibliography ==
- White, Verdine; Satterfield, Louis (1978). Norman Schwartz (ed.). Playing the Bass Guitar. Hollywood: Almo. ISBN 0897050118. OCLC 6606541.
