= Verdine White =

American bassist (born 1951)

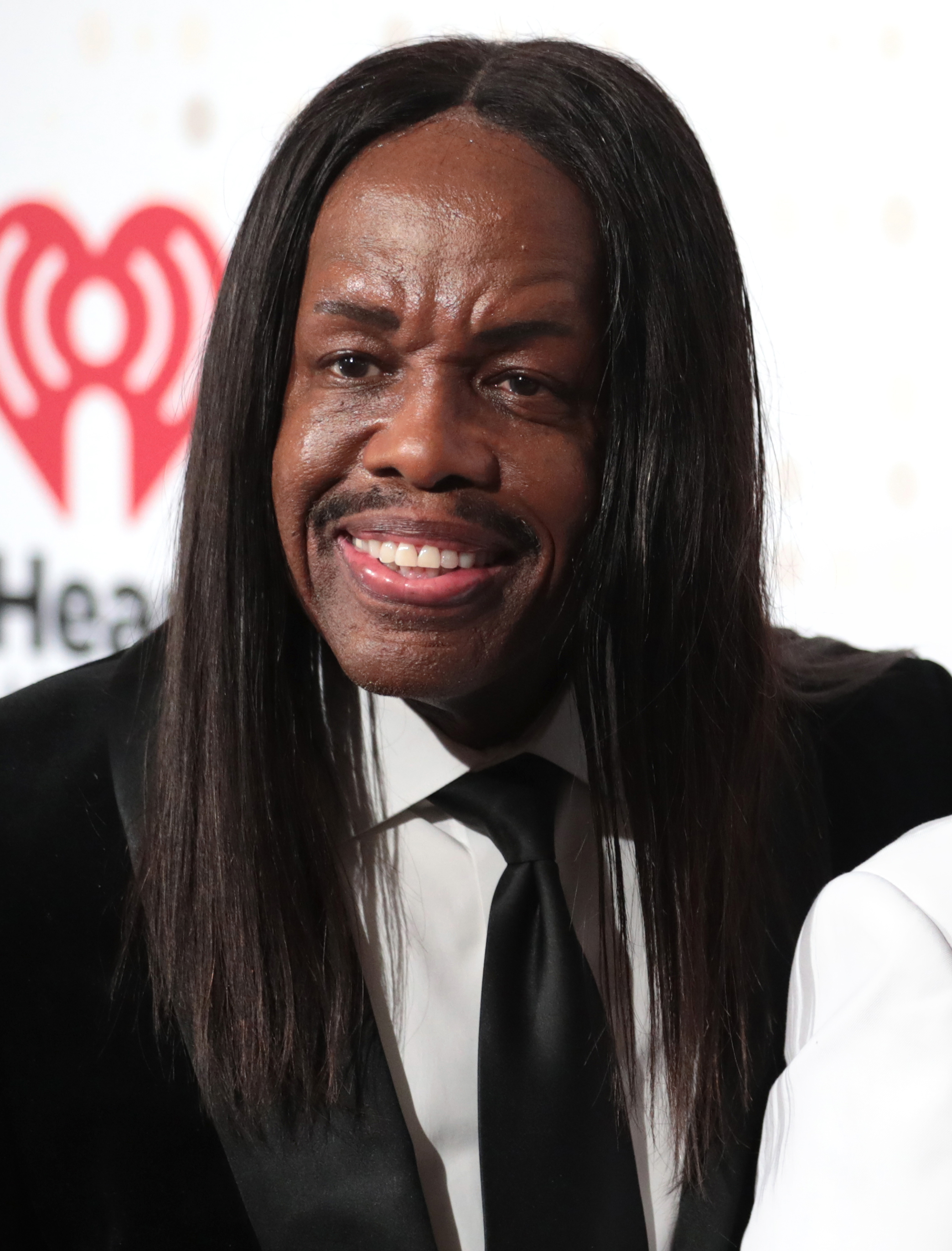
- White in 2023

Background information
- Born: Verdine Adams Jr. July 25, 1951 (age 75); Chicago, Illinois, U.S.
- Genres: R&B; funk; soul; jazz fusion
- Occupations: Musician; songwriter; record producer
- Instrument: Bass guitar
- Years active: 1969–present
- Formerly of: Earth, Wind & Fire, Level 42, The Emotions
- Website: verdinewhite.com

External videos
- "Superman" 2024 solo project

Verdine Adams White (born Verdine Adams Jr.; July 25, 1951) is an American musician, best known as a founding member and bassist for the band Earth, Wind & Fire. White was placed at No. 19 on Rolling Stone's list of "The 50 Greatest Bassists of All Time".

== Early life ==
Verdine was born Verdine Adams, Jr. in Chicago, Illinois, on July 25, 1951. His father, Verdine Sr., was a doctor who also played the saxophone. He grew up listening to recordings of Miles Davis, John Coltrane, and other jazz musicians. He was also influenced by Cleveland Eaton, The Beatles, the Motown sound, and his two drummer brothers, Fred and Maurice. When he was 15, he saw a double bass in his high school orchestra class and decided that he wanted to play bass.

He soon got a red electric bass and, taking the advice of brother Maurice and his father, took private lessons from Radi Velah of the Chicago Symphony Orchestra, learning the Billè double bass method, and on weekends learned the electric bass with Chess Records session bassist and trombonist Louis Satterfield, who would later become a member of Earth, Wind & Fire's famed horn section, The Phenix Horns. Verdine says he learned everything about the bass guitar from Louis Satterfield, and some of his early bass influences were James Jamerson, Paul McCartney, and Gary Karr.

Moving toward a newly bought Fender Telecaster Bass instead of the upright bass, Verdine began working the Chicago club scene with local bands. Meanwhile, brother Maurice, who was a former session drummer at Chess Records and a member of pianist Ramsey Lewis' trio, had formed the Salty Peppers, scoring a local hit that caught the ears of Capitol Records.

In early 1970 Maurice moved to Los Angeles, hoping to record the group, which he had renamed Earth, Wind & Fire and called up Verdine asking whether he would like to join, which he did, arriving in Los Angeles on June 6, 1970.

== Career ==
=== Earth, Wind & Fire ===
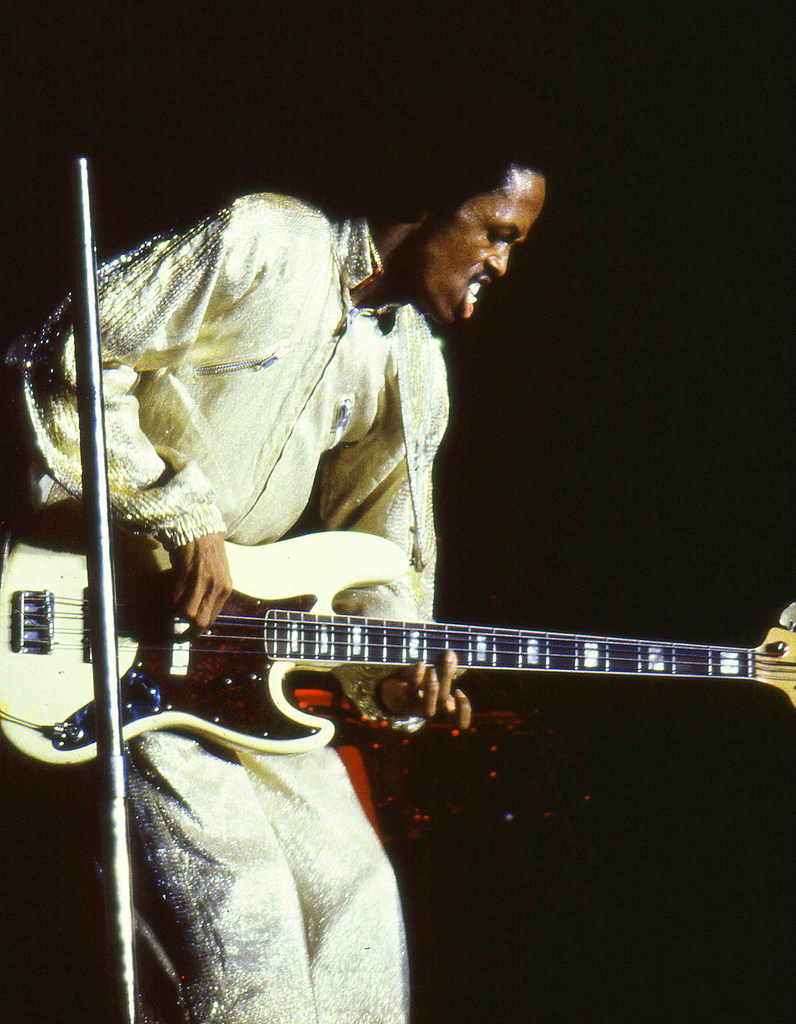
White performing in the Netherlands, 1982

As Earth, Wind & Fire's bassist since the band's inception, White has won six and received two honoree Grammy Awards, has been Grammy nominated eighteen times and has also been inducted into the Rock and Roll Hall of Fame and the Vocal Group Hall of Fame, to name a few honors. The band has also earned more than 50 gold and platinum albums and have sold over 90 million albums worldwide.

In November 2008 White was presented with Bass Player magazine's Lifetime Achievement Award by Nathan East. On Friday, February 26, 2010, Verdine was inducted as a member of Phi Beta Sigma fraternity at the ceremony held at the Crowne Plaza Beverly Hills Hotel in Los Angeles, California. Verdine White holds an honorary doctorate degree from the American Conservatory of Music.

On July 2, 2020, Rolling Stone Australia ranked White number 19 on "The 50 Greatest Bassists of All Time".

On December 19, 2024, White released his first ever solo project entitled, "Superman", in honor of his late brother and founder of Earth, Wind & Fire Maurice White. The song was written by White, Motown songwriter Janie Bradford and Carnell Harrell. The song was produced by White's wife Shelly Clark who is a member of the 70s group Honey Cone. It's White's first time out as lead singer. Honey Cone members Shelly Clark, Kathy Merrick and Wendy Smith-Brune are on background vocals. Earth, Wind & Fire's drummer John Paris did all of the musical arrangements.

=== Songwriter ===
White's credits as a songwriter date back to Earth, Wind & Fire's self-titled debut studio album, on which White co-wrote "C'mon Children" and "Bad Tune". White co-wrote three songs on their third album, Last Days and Time. He had one writing credit on their fourth album, Head To The Sky. On their fifth album, Open Our Eyes, White co-wrote the group's first top 5 R&B/Soul hit (No. 4), "Mighty, Mighty" along with his brother Maurice. They also co-wrote, "Kalimba Story", a top 10 R&B/Soul hit (No. 6). These two songs along with their single, "Devotion" (No. 23), helped the album top Billboard's Soul Album Chart, given them their first No. 1 album. White's co-writes include some of Earth, Wind & Fire's biggest hits, such as "That's the Way of the World".

White is credited on many artist's songs as heard in commercials, film soundtracks, and televisions shows.

== Other work ==
=== Philanthropy ===
White is the co-founder and director of the Verdine White Foundation, which aims to provide musical education to underprivileged and gifted students. During 2007 he was as well inducted into the Boys and Girls Club's Alumni Hall of Fame.

White is the founder of the non profit organization, The Verdine White Performing Arts Center (VWPAC), located in Los Angeles. Founded in 2010, VWPAC encourages students to reach their fullest potential as artists and people, equipped with a well-rounded performing arts education and the confidence to take on whatever path they choose within the arts.

=== Author ===
In 1978, White co-authored a book with Louis Satterfield, Playing the Bass Guitar.

== Personal life ==
Verdine White lives in Los Angeles in a house built in 1919, with his wife of 45 years Shelly Clark. She was once a member of R&B groups The Ikettes and Honey Cone. They have a son and a granddaughter. He also has a twin sister by the name of Geraldine. He is the younger half-brother of Earth, Wind, and Fire band founder Maurice White (December 19, 1941 – February 4, 2016), and older brother of drummer Fred White (January 13, 1955 – January 1, 2023), and Monte White, (October 16, 1953 - April 21, 2020). Both were members of Earth, Wind & Fire. Fred played drums and percussion as a band member from 1974 to 1984 and was inducted with the band into the Rock & Roll Hall of Fame in 2000. Monte served as the group's tour manager from 1974 to 1984.

== Discography ==
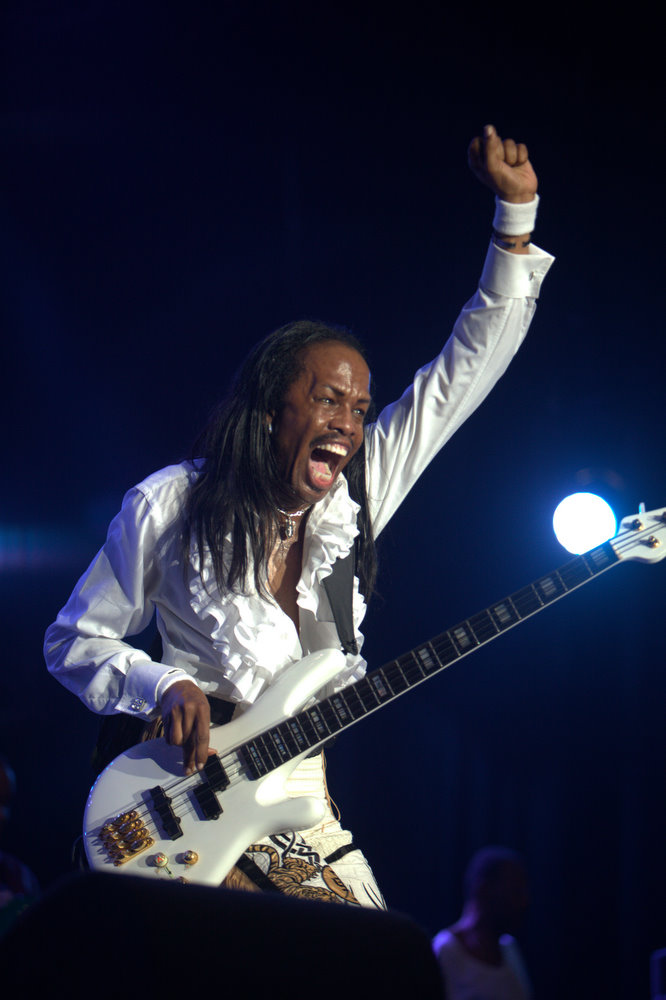
White with Earth Wind, and Fire performing in 2010 in the Netherlands

=== Solo project ===
- 2024 Verdine White: "Superman" – (Co-writer, Lead vocals and bass)

=== Backing musician and production credits ===
- 1974 Ramsey Lewis: Sun Goddess – (bass, vocals)
- 1975 Ramsey Lewis: Electric Collection – (bass, vocals)
- 1976 Gene Harris: In a Special Way – (bass)
- 1976 The Emotions: Flowers – (bass)
- 1976 Deniece Williams: This Is Niecy – (bass)
- 1977 The Emotions: Rejoice – (bass)
- 1977: Gene Harris: Tone Tantrum – (bass)
- 1977: Lenny White: Big City
- 1977: Harvey Mason: Funk in a Mason Jar
- 1977: Pockets: Come Go With Us – (producer)
- 1977 Deniece Williams: Song Bird – (bass)
- 1978 The Emotions: Sunbeam – (bass)
- 1978 Valerie Carter: Wild Child - (bass)
- 1978 Eumir Deodato: Love Island – (bass)
- 1979 Harvey Mason: Groovin You – (bass)
- 1979 Stargard: The Changing of the Gard – (bass, producer)
- 1983 Level 42: Standing in the Light – (producer)
- 1992 Norman Brown: Just Between Us
- 1995 Freddie Ravel: Sol to Soul – (bass, associate producer)
- 1997 Urban Knights: Urban Knights II – (bass, producer)
- 2002 Jennifer Lopez: This Is Me... Then – (bass)
- 2012 Solange: True – (bass)
- 2015 Flo Rida: I Don't Like It, I Love It – (bass)
- 2017 Nathan East: Reverence – (bass)
- 2017 Kelly Clarkson: Meaning of Life – (bass)
- 2023 Victoria Monet: Jaguar II – (bass)

== Awards ==
=== RIAA Awards ===
Multi-Platinum Albums

- 1975 - That's The Way Of The World
- 1975 - Gratitude
- 1976 - Spirit

Platinum Albums

- 1973 - Head To The Sky
- 1974 - Open Our Eyes
- 1981 - Raise!

Gold Albums

- 1980 - Faces
- 1983 - Powerlight
- 1987 - Touch The World
- 1988 - The Best Of Earth, Wind & Fire Vol. II
- 2003 - The Essential Earth, Wind & Fire

Gold Singles

- 1975 - "Shining Star"
- 1975 - "Singasong"
- 1976 - "Getaway"
- 1978 - "September"
- 1978 - "Got To Get You Into My Life"
- 1979 - "Boogie Wonderland"
- 1979 - "After The Love Has Gone"
- 1981 - "Let's Groove"

=== Inductions ===
- 1995 - Star on Hollywood's Walk Of Fame
- 2000 - Rock & Roll Hall Of Fame
- 2003 - Inducted into Hollywood's RockWalk
- 2003 - Inducted into The Vocal Group Hall Of Fame
- 2010 - Songwriters Hall Of Fame
- 2012 - Beacon of Change award at the Beacon Awards Banquet
- 2019 - Kennedy Center Honors
- 2026 - California American Entertainment Hall of Fame

=== Grammy Awards ===
- 2016 - Lifetime Achievement Award
- 2008 - GRAMMY Hall Of Fame, "Shining Star"
- 2004 - NARAS Signature Governors Award
- 1982 - Best R&B Performance By A Duo Or Group With Vocals, "Wanna Be With You"
- 1979 - Best R&B Vocal Performance By A Duo, Group Or Chorus, "After The Love Has Gone"
- 1979 - Best R&B Instrumental Performance, "Boogie Wonderland"
- 1978 - Best R&B Vocal Performance By A Duo, Group Or Chorus, "All 'n All"
- 1978 - Best R&B Instrumental Performance, "Runnin'"
- 1975 - Best R&B Vocal Performance By A Duo, Group Or Chorus, "Shining Star"

=== American Music Awards ===
- 1976 - Favorite Band, Duo Or Group - Soul/Rhythm & Blues
- 1977 - Favorite Band, Duo Or Group - Soul/Rhythm & Blues
- 1978 - Favorite Band, Duo Or Group - Soul/Rhythm & Blues
- 1980 - Favorite Band, Duo Or Group - Soul/Rhythm & Blues

=== Other awards ===
- 1994 - NAACP Hall Of Fame Image Award
- 2002 - BET Lifetime Achievement Award
- 2002 - ASCAP Rhythm & Soul Heritage Award
- 2002 - TV Land's Entertainer Award
- 2002 - The Daniel L. Stephenson Humanitarian Award for Lifetime Achievement in Music
- 2008 - Bass Player Lifetime Achievement Award
- 2008 - Honorary Doctorates in the arts from Columbia College in Chicago
- 2016 - Induction into The Soul Music Hall of Fame.
- 2021 - Mayor John Hamilton proclaimed February 1, 2021, Verdine White and Shelly Clark day in Bloomington, Indiana.
