= Songs (Rotary Connection album) =

Studio album by Rotary Connection
- Released: May 1969
- Recorded: March 1969
- Studio: Ter Mar Studios, Chicago, Illinois, US
- Label: Cadet (LPS-322)
- Producer: Marshall Chess, Charles Stepney

Rotary Connection chronology
Peace (1968)	Songs (1969)	Dinner Music (1970)

Professional ratings
Review scores
Source	Rating
Allmusic	4/5 stars
Muzik	4/5 stars

Songs is the fourth album by the American psychedelic soul group Rotary Connection issued in May 1969 on Cadet Records.

== Covers ==
Rotary Connection covered artists such as Cream, The Band, Otis Redding, Muddy Waters, The Rolling Stones and Jimi Hendrix on the album. The album is also noted for including a song written for the band by Stevie Wonder, titled "This Town." The song was the very first one written by the then-18-year-old Wonder for a non-Motown artist, and would be performed by him in live concerts.

== Track listing ==
1. "Respect" (Otis Redding) – 3:05
2. "The Weight" (Robbie Robertson) – 3:24
3. "Sunshine of Your Love" (Pete Brown, Jack Bruce, Eric Clapton) – 5:07
4. "I've Got My Mojo Working" (Preston "Red" Foster) – 2:38
5. "Burning of the Midnight Lamp" (Jimi Hendrix) – 4:40
6. "Tales of Brave Ulysses" (Eric Clapton, Martin Sharp) – 4:28
7. "This Town" (Stevie Wonder) – 3:25
8. "We're Going Wrong" (Jack Bruce) – 3:20
9. "Salt of the Earth" (Mick Jagger, Keith Richards) – 4:55

== Personnel ==
Rotary Connection

- Sidney Barnes
- Minnie Riperton
- John Stocklin
- Kenny Venegas
- Bobby Simms
- John Jeremiah
- Mitch Aliotta

Technical personnel

- Marshall Chess, Charles Stepney – producer
- Charles Stepney – arranger
- Ron Malo – engineer
- Linn Erlich – photography
- Randy Harter – album design
