= Jeff St John =

Australian musician (1946–2018)

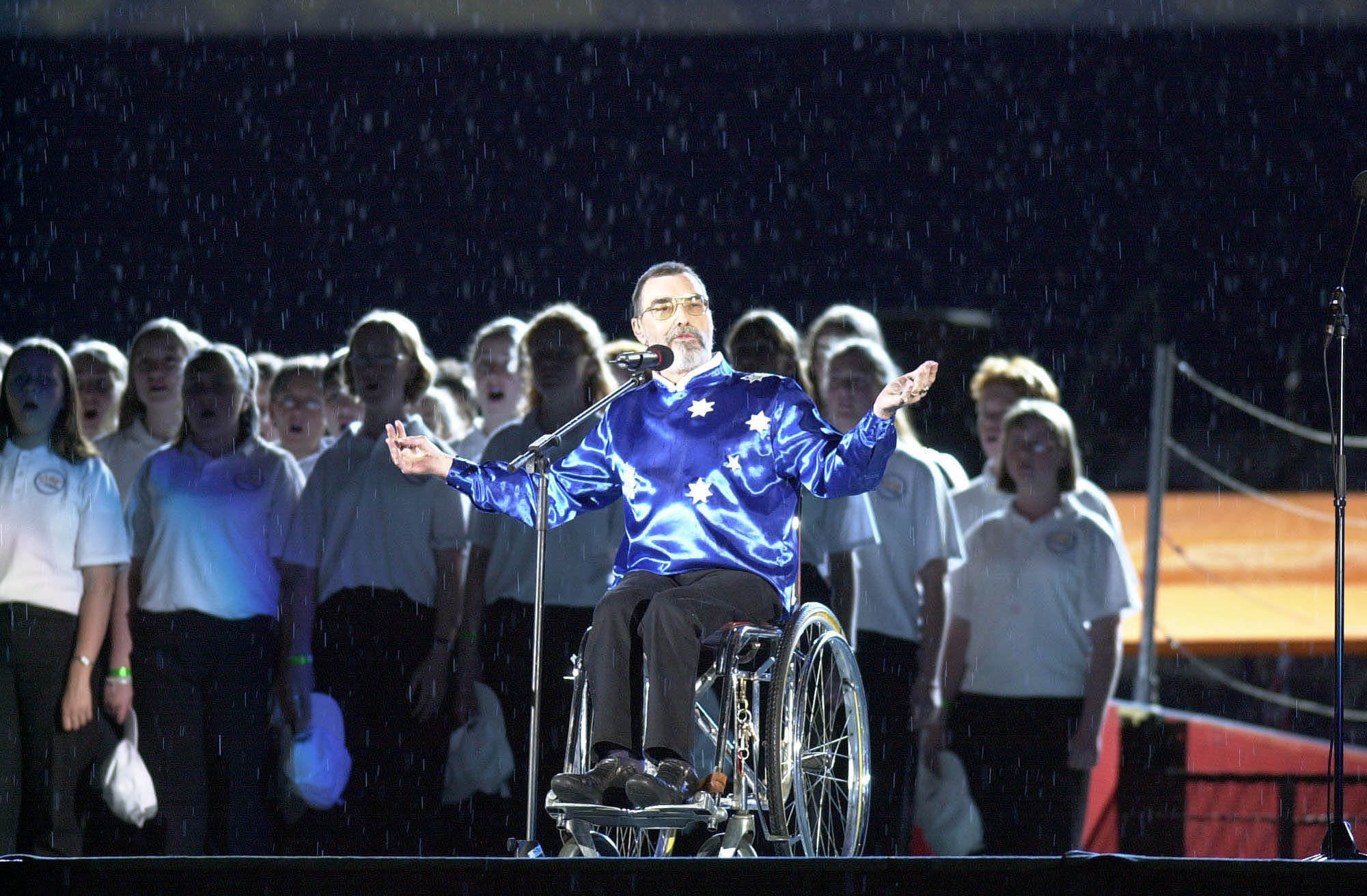
- Jeff St John performing at the opening ceremony of the 2000 Sydney Paralympic Games

Background information
- Born: Jeffrey Leo Newton; 22 April 1946; Newtown, New South Wales, Australia
- Origin: Sydney, Australia
- Died: 6 March 2018 (aged 71) Perth, Western Australia
- Genres: Soul, R&B, rock
- Occupation: Singer
- Instrument: Vocals
- Years active: 1961–1983, 1999–
- Labels: Spin, Asylum/Warner

Jeff St John (born Jeffrey Leo Newton; 22 April 1946 – 6 March 2018), was an Australian musician known for his local hit singles, "Big Time Operator" (1967), "Teach Me How to Fly" (1970) and "A Fool in Love" (1977). He was born with spina bifida and was an advocate for disabled people, he died in 2018, aged 71.

== Early life ==
St John was born Jeffrey Leo Newton on 22 April 1946, in Newtown, Sydney. He was the only child of father Leo, a linesman and mother Carmel, a secretary. He was born with spina bifida and underwent numerous operations to improve his mobility. St John attended Cleveland Street Boys High School in Surry Hills, New South Wales. At 15-years-old he appeared on the television talent show, Opportunity Knocks and became a regular during 1961 to 1963. Due to loss of lower limb mobility he wore orthoses (leg calipers) and from early 1965 he used crutches. By the late 1960s, after surgeries and further mobility loss he used a wheelchair.

== Music career ==
St John was lead vocalist for various soul, R&B and rock bands in Sydney during the late 1960s and early 1970s: the Syndicate a.k.a. the Wild Oats (1965), The Id (1966–67) with Bob Bertles (tenor sax 1967), Jeff St John & Yama (1967–68), Jeff St John & Copperwine (1969–72), with Harry Brus (bass 1970–72) and Wendy Saddington (co-lead vocals 1970–71), Jeff St John Band (1972–73) and Red Cloud (1975–76).

St John's first recording was the Id's debut single, "Lindy Lou", which was issued in February 1966 via Spin Records, but it did not chart. Alongside St John on lead vocals the line-up was Peter Anson on guitar, King Fisher on trumpet, John Helman on bass guitar, Bruce Johnson on tenor sax, Don McCormack on drums and Ian Walsh on organ and flute. The group's fourth single, "Big Time Operator", was released in December of that year, which is a cover version of Zoot Money's Big Roll Band's 1966 United Kingdom hit. The Id's rendition peaked at No. 12 on the Go-Set National Top 40 in March 1967, and No. 11 on the Kent Music Report (KMR) singles chart (retro-calculated in 1993).

His next charting single, "Teach Me How to Fly", which was a track on Aladdin (1968), the second album for United States band Rotary Connection. Jeff St John & Copperwine's version was issued in November 1970 and reached No. 16 on Go-Set National Top 60 and No. 11 on KMR. Copperwine were more rock-orientated and had formed in 1969 with Peter Figures on drums, Ross East on guitar, Barry Kelly on piano, organ and backing vocals and Alan Ingram on bass guitar and vocals. Brus replaced Ingram on bass guitar and Saddington joined on co-lead vocals in 1970. Copperwine were compared favourably by Australian musicologist, Ian McFarlane with Sydney's "head music" contemporaries, Tully and Tamam Shud. St John left Copperwine in January 1972 after arguments over his songwriting contributions.

With his self-titled band, St John issued further singles from 1972, but none charted. They supported tours by visiting international artists, Bo Diddley, Chuck Berry and then Gary Glitter. He disbanded the group in late 1973 prior to relocating to the UK as a solo artist. St John performed a few "low key gigs" in London and returned to Sydney in August 1974. By 1975 his backing band was Red Cloud comprising Neil Bamford on drums, Tony Lyon on bass guitar and Russell Moran on guitar. In mid-1976 they supported Diddley on his Australian tour. As a solo artist, in 1977, St John signed with Asylum Records/Warner Music, which issued his single, "A Fool in Love" (1977) – it peaked at No. 10 on KMR in August. The song was written by Frankie Miller and Andy Fraser. St John had top 100 singles with "Rock 'n' Roll Man" (1977) and "Starbrite" (1978).

In 1980, St John was the subject of an episode, "Jeff St. John - Rock 'n' Roll Man" of the documentary series The Australians, presented by Peter Luck. In 1983 he announced his retirement from live performances. Music journalist Glenn A. Baker described St John's singing with a "roaring, finely controlled voice", while McFarlane rated him as "Australia's finest rock vocalist" from the 1960s and 1970s. In 1985, St John had a guest role as himself on TV soap opera, A Country Practice. He portrayed a hospital patient who performs a charity concert at the local club.

In 1988, as part of Australian Bicentenary celebrations along with many other Australian celebrities, St John took part in a video shoot at Uluru (once called Ayers Rock), Celebration of a Nation. In the late 1990s he relocated to Perth, Western Australia and resumed his singing career by 1999.

St John was involved in educating people about disabilities and was a member of spina bifida support group MOSAIC. He appeared at the opening of the 2000 Summer Paralympics in Sydney where he sang the Australian National Anthem (see infobox above), and a song written for the opening ceremony, "The Challenge". In the early 2000s he fronted Jeffrey St John & the Embers with Bill Blissett on keyboards and vocals, Ace Follington on drums, Peter Slatter on bass guitar and vocals and Russell Smith on guitar and vocals. The group issued an album, Will the Real Jeff St. John Please Stand Up. in 2001.

St John's autobiography, The Jeff St John Story: The Inside Outsider, edited by James Anfuso, was published by Starman Books in 2015.

== Death ==
Jeff St John died on 6 March 2018, at Fiona Stanley Hospital in Perth, Western Australia. His death was caused by a bacterial infection following surgery.

== Discography ==
=== Albums ===
List of albums, with Australian chart positions
Title	Album details	Peak chart positions
Title	Album details	AUS
Joint Effort (as Jeff St John's Copperwine)	Released: 1971; Format: LP; Label: Spin (SEL-933742)	-
The Best of Jeff St. John	Released: 1972; Format: LP; Label: Spin (SEL-934500)	-
Jeff St. John Live	Released: 1974; Format: LP; Label: Infinity (L 35083)	-
Survivor 1965-75	Released: 1977; Format: LP; Label: Infinity (L 36478)	-
So Far So Good	Released: 1978; Format: LP; Label: Asylum Records (600037)	66
Will the Real Jeff St. John Please Stand Up. (with the Embers)	Released: 2001; Format: CD; Label: Asylum Records (600037)	-

=== Singles ===
Year	Title	Peak positions	
Year	Title	AUS Go-Set	AUS KMR
1966	"Lindy Lou" (by the Id featuring Jeff St John)	–	–
1966	"The Jerk" (by the Id featuring Jeff St John)	–	–
1966	"Black Girl" (by the Id featuring Jeff St John)	–	–
1966	"Big Time Operator" (by the Id featuring Jeff St John)	12	11
1967	"You Got Me Hummin'" (by the Id featuring Jeff St John)	–	–
1967	"Nothing Comes Easy" (by the Id featuring Jeff St John)	–	–
1970	"Cloud Nine" (by Jeff St John & Copperwine)	–	–
1970	"Teach Me How to Fly" (by Jeff St John & Copperwine)	16	11
1971	"Hummingbird" (by Jeff St John & Copperwine)	–	–
1972	"Yesterday's Music" (by Jeff St John & Copperwine)	–	–
1973	"Yesterday's Music" (by Jeff St John, US release)		
1975	"Mr Jones"		–
1975	"Blood Brother"		–
1977	"A Fool in Love"		10
1977	"Rock 'n' Roll Man"		81
1978	"Starbrite"		85
