= Aladdin (Rotary Connection album) =

Studio album by Rotary Connection
- Released: October 1968
- Recorded: August 1968
- Studio: Ter Mar Studios, Chicago, Illinois, US
- Genre: Psychedelic soul
- Length: 42:28
- Language: English
- Label: Cadet
- Producer: Marshall Chess; Charles Stepney

Rotary Connection chronology
Rotary Connection (1967)	Aladdin (1968)	Peace (1968)

Aladdin is a 1968 studio album by American psychedelic soul group Rotary Connection, released on Cadet Records

== Reception ==
Editors at AllMusic rated this album 3 out of 5 stars, with critic Andy Kellman writing this album "ushered in a bigger and bolder Rotary Connection" with music that is "more streamlined and less scatterbrained without shedding the limitless approach that made its predecessor such an intrepid undertaking". Kellman also reviewed a single-CD compilation of Aladdin and Dinner Music, also rating it three stars, noting that this is the only way to get this music on CD, but critiquing that these are the band's two weakest albums. In a review for retailers, Billboard called this "another fine swinging album" and spotlighted several tracks as particularly strong and the magazine also recommended the "Paper Castle" single as being "loaded... with sales appeal".

== Track listing ==
1. "Life Could" (Bobby Simms) – 4:10
2. "Teach Me How to Fly" (Sidney Barnes) – 3:20
3. "V.I.P." (Simms) – 3:04
4. "Let Them Talk" (Simms) – 4:25
5. "I Took a Ride (Caravan)" (Ando) – 6:06
6. "Aladdin" (Steven William Duboff and Artie Kornfeld) – 4:25
7. "Magical World" (Barnes) – 4:23
8. "I Must Be There" (Keith Anderson and Simms) – 3:34
9. "I Feel Sorry" (Mitch Aliotta) – 4:10
10. "Paper Castle" (Maurice Dollison) – 4:17

== Personnel ==
Rotary Connection

- Mitch Aliotta – vocals
- Sidney Barnes – vocals
- Judy Hauff – vocals
- Minnie Riperton – vocals
- Bobby Simms – vocals
- Charles Stepney – arrangement, production
- Tommy Vincent – vocals

Additional personnel

- Marshall Chess – production
- Don Holden – mastering
- Hurvis, Binzer & Churchill, Inc. – cover design
- Mel Kaspar – photography
- Ron Malo – recording

== Chart performance ==
Aladdin peaked at 176 on the Billboard 200.

== See also ==
- List of 1968 albums
