= Hey, Love =

Studio album by Rotary Connection
- Released: 1971
- Studio: Ter-Mar, Chicago, Illinois, US
- Genre: Psychedelic soul
- Length: 39:45
- Language: English
- Label: Cadet
- Producer: Charles Stepney

Rotary Connection chronology
Dinner Music (1970)	Hey, Love (1971)	Black Gold: The Very Best of Rotary Connection (2006)

Hey, Love is a 1971 studio album by American psychedelic soul group Rotary Connection released by Cadet Records.

== Reception ==
Editors at AllMusic rated this album 4 out of 5 stars, with critic Andy Kellman writing that this is "one of Rotary Connection's best records" and recommends to listeners that this is as vital to the band's discography as their debut album, furthermore stating that "I Am the Black Gold of the Sun" "is the apex, the brightest moment in the group's discography". In The Rough Guide to the Best Music You've Never Heard, Nigel Williamson credits this track with resurrecting the band's career. In a review for retailers, Billboard called the group a "sweeping soul combo" and highlighted the vocals as well as Charles Stepney's work as particularly strong. In Psychedelia and Other Colours, Rob Chapman states that this album is stronger than predecessor Dinner Music and credits Stepney for being "at the top of his game".

== Track listing ==
All songs written by Richard Rudolph and Charles Stepney unless otherwise stated.

Side One
No.	Title	Writer(s)	Length
1.	"If I Sing My Song"		3:39
2.	"The Sea and She"	Rudolph	3:30
3.	"I Am the Black Gold of the Sun"		5:44
4.	"Hanging Round the Bee Tree"	Rudolph	3:38
5.	"Hey, Love"		4:10

Side Two
No.	Title	Writer(s)	Length
6.	"Love Has Fallen on Me"	Stepney, Andrew Lloyd Webber	4:10
7.	"Song for Everyman"	Terry Callier	5:32
8.	"Love Is"		5:17
9.	"Vine of Happiness"		4:05
Total length:			39:45

== Personnel ==
Rotary Connection

- Pat Ferreri – guitar
- Henry Gibson – congas
- Kitty Haywood – alto and soprano vocals
- Dave Scott – tenor vocals
- Donny Simmons – percussion
- Sydney Simms – bass guitar
- Charles Stepney – piano, harpsichord, organ, electric piano, horn arrangement, vocal arrangement
- Minnie Riperton – soprano vocals
- Phil Upchurch – guitar
- Shirley Wahls – contralto vocals

Additional personnel

- Peter Amft – photography
- Maurer Productions – design
- Michael Mendel – design
- Gary Starr – engineering

== See also ==
- List of 1971 albums
