= Peace (Rotary Connection album) =

Studio album by Rotary Connection
- Released: December 1968
- Recorded: 1968
- Studio: Ter Mar Studios, Chicago, Illinois, US
- Genre: Christmas music; psychedelic soul
- Length: 43:18
- Language: English
- Label: Cadet
- Producer: Marshall Chess; Charles Stepney

Rotary Connection chronology
Aladdin (1968)	Peace (1968)	Songs (1969)

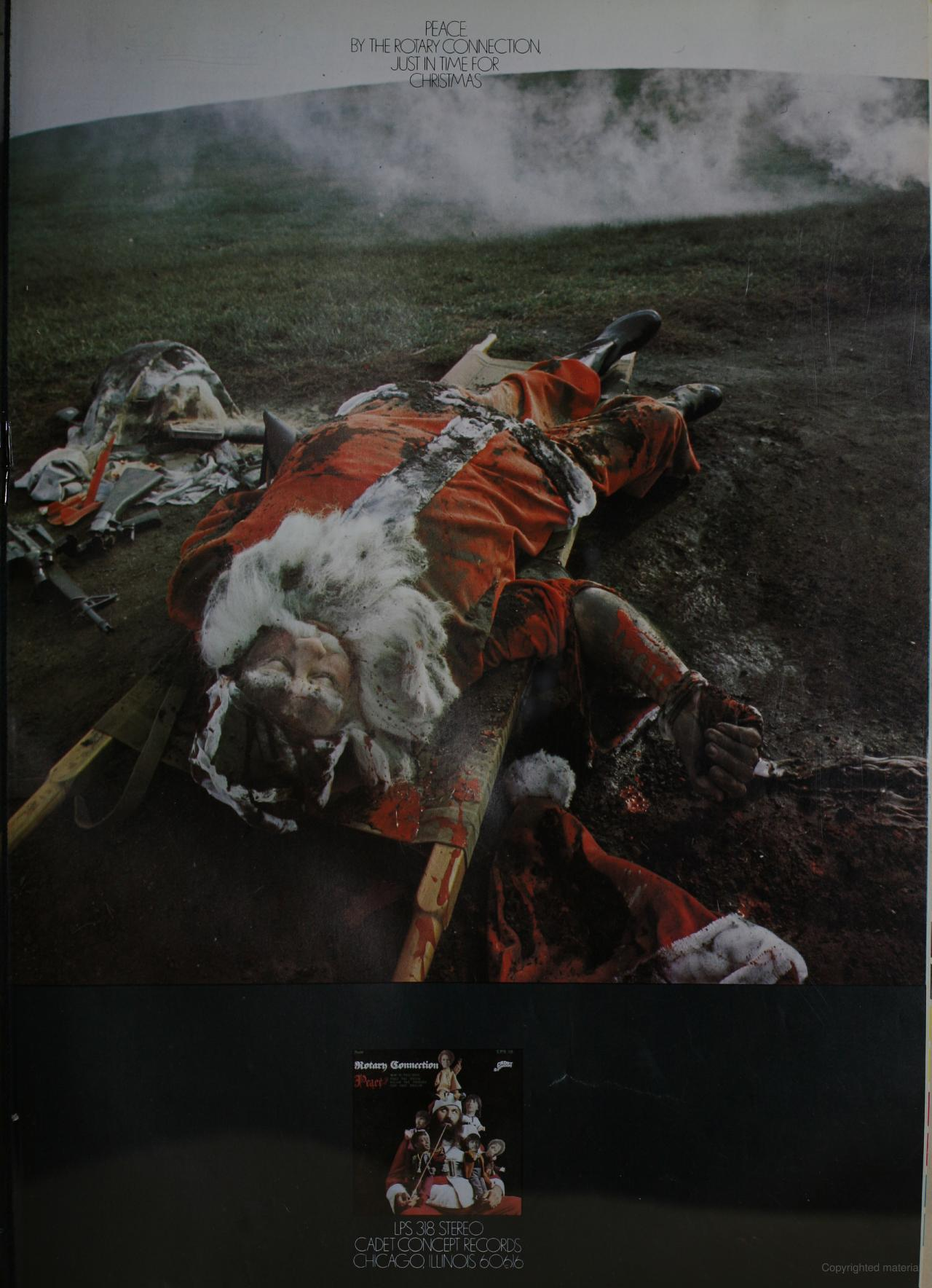
A Billboard ad for the album which generated more controversy than any other in the publication to date.

Peace is a 1968 studio album by American psychedelic soul group Rotary Connection, released on Cadet Records

== Reception ==
Editors at AllMusic rated this album 4 out of 5 stars, with critic Rodney Batdorf writing that this "is a terrific, soulful Christmas album" that "has all the hallmarks of a late-'60s pop-soul record". In a review for retailers, Billboard recommended this release as "a holiday package filled with Christmas" with a "marketable style".

== Track listing ==
1. "Opening Round" (Mitch Aliotta) – 1:52
2. "Silent Night" (Franz Gruber and Joseph Mohr) – 5:57
3. "Christmas Love" (Morris Dollison) – 3:09
4. "Last Call for Peace" (Arthur Feldman and H. White) – 2:52
5. "Shopping Bag Menagerie" (Sidney Barnes) – 3:49
6. "Silent Night" (Marshall Paul and Charles Stepney) – 3:41
7. "Christmas Child" (Dollison and Stepney) – 2:42
8. "Peace at Least" (Feldman) – 4:11
9. "Santa's Little Helpers" (Jim Donlinger and Jim Nyeholt) – 0:34
10. "Sidewalk Santa" (Barnes) – 4:21
11. "If Peace Was All We Had" (J. Donlinger and Tim Donlinger) – 4:49
12. "Silent Night Chant" (Paul and Stepney) – 4:33
13. "Silence" – 0:30

== Personnel ==
Rotary Connection

- Mitch Aliotta – vocals
- Sidney Barnes – vocals
- Jim Donlinger – vocals
- Tom Donlinger – vocals
- Jim Nyeholt – vocals
- Minnie Riperton – vocals
- Bobby Simms – vocals
- Charles Stepney – vocals, arrangement, production

Additional personnel

- Marshall Chess – production
- Don Holden – mastering
- Jerry Griffith – design
- Ron Malo – recording
- Warren Meyer – photography

== Chart performance ==
Peace peaked at 24 on the Billboard 200.

== See also ==
- List of 1968 albums
