= Jamar Chess =

American music publisher

- Born: 1980 or 1981 (age 44–45)
- Occupation: Music publisher
- Organization(s): Sunflower Entertainment Group, Spirit Music Latino
- Spouse: Shana Renée Scala
- Relatives: Marshall Chess (father); Leonard Chess (grandfather)

Jamar Chess is an American music publisher. He is president and co-founder of Sunflower Entertainment Group, a music publishing firm and record label that focuses on independent Latin music and manages a catalogue of music, including work from Lionel Hampton, Count Basie, Ike Turner, Jackie Wilson, Otis Redding, Frank Sinatra, Thelonious Monk, Marvin Gaye, Alan O'Day, Duke Ellington, and Charles Stepney.

== Early life ==
Jamar Chess is the son of Robin and Marshall Chess. His grandfather is Leonard Chess, who started Chess Records in Chicago in 1950. Chess Records was the label of artists including Chuck Berry, Etta James, Bo Diddley, Buddy Guy, John Lee Hooker, Howlin' Wolf, and Muddy Waters. Chess's father, Marshall Chess, is a record producer who formed Rolling Stones Records in 1970, which he ran for seven years. He helped create The Rolling Stones tongue and lip logo, and was executive producer on seven Rolling Stone albums.

As a young man, Chess worked at Arc Music Group, the publishing arm of Chess Records, managing the blues catalog. He later became creative director of the company, He also held the Creative A&R International position where he managed the company's international operations. He worked with the company's catalog and focused on remix projects, digital licensing and synchronization licensing.

== Career ==
In 2002, Chess co-founded Sunflower Entertainment Group, a specialty music publishing house that focuses on independent Latin music and classic publishing catalogs, with Marshall Chess and Juan Carlos Barguil. Sunflower was established under Arc Music.

Chess was featured in Billboard's annual "30 Under 30 Power Player" list for 2009.

In 2015, Chess worked with music producer Liza Richardson to include over 40 songs from Sunflower's Columbian catalog in the Netflix series Narcos.

In April 2016, Chess and business partner Juan Carlos Barguil started Spirit Music Latino, a joint venture with indie music publisher Spirit Music Group. Spirit Music Latino is a division of Spirit Music focused on Latin songwriters, artists and catalogs.

== Personal life ==
In 2018, he married Shana Renée Scala. Together, they have a son, Jackson Leo Chess (b. 2019).

== Discography ==
Year	Album	Artist	Role
2015	Los Bravos de la Cumbia	La Sonora Dinamita	Compiled
2013	Puro Caribe 2013	Various artists	Producer
2011	En Barranquilla Me Quedo	Jo Arroyo Y La Verdad	Executive Producer
2011	Tropicialisimo Mega Mix	Various artists	Producer
2009	Heavy on the Salsa!	Various artists	Producer, Mastering
2008	Chess Moves: Future Blues	Keith LeBlanc	Executive Producer, Digital Editing
