= Mother Nature's Son (disambiguation) =

"Mother Nature's Son" is a song by the Beatles.

Mother Nature's Son may also refer to:

- Mother Nature's Son (album), an album by Ramsey Lewis
- "Mother Nature's Son" (Only Fools and Horses), an episode in the TV series Only Fools and Horses
