= Dinner Music (Rotary Connection album) =

Studio album by Rotary Connection
- Released: 1970
- Recorded: November 1969
- Studio: Ter-Mar, Chicago, Illinois, US
- Genre: Psychedelic soul
- Length: 34:43
- Language: English
- Label: Cadet
- Producer: Marshall Chess; Charles Stepney

Rotary Connection chronology
Songs (1969)	Dinner Music (1970)	Hey, Love (1971)

Dinner Music is a 1970 studio album by American psychedelic soul group Rotary Connection, released by Cadet Records.

== Reception ==
Editors at AllMusic rated this album 2.5 out of 5 stars, with critic Andy Kellman writing that "the only accurate prediction one could have made before going into a Rotary Connection record was that it would be unpredictable" and continued that this is "the least-uniform Rotary Connection record", which "comes off like a series of tangents with little in the way of cohesion". Kellman also reviewed a single-CD compilation of Aladdin and Dinner Music, also rating it three stars, noting that this is the only way to get this music on CD, but critiquing that these are the band's two weakest albums. In a review for retailers, Billboard recommended this album for having "topnotch performances" and specifically praised Minnie Riperton's vocals.

"Want You to Know" peaked at 96 on the Billboard Hot 100.

== Track listing ==
All songs written by Jon Stocklin unless otherwise stated. No writing credits are given for tracks 1, 4, 12, or 14.

Side One
No.	Title	Writer(s)	Length
1.	"Pointillism"	N/A	0:20
2.	"We Will Be Free"	Bobby Simms, Stocklin	3:00
3.	"Living Alone"		2:53
4.	"Lektricks #1"	N/A	0:45
5.	"Country Things"		3:04
6.	"Quartet"	Brian Heller	0:58
7.	"May Our Amens Be True"	Sidney Barnes, Stocklin	3:00
8.	"Stormy Monday Blues"	Robert Crowder, Billy Eckstine, Earl Hines	3:57

Side Two
No.	Title	Writer(s)	Length
9.	"Love Me Now"	Cash McCall	2:45
10.	"Lonely Summer"	Simms	2:40
11.	"Amuse"		4:00
12.	"Lektricks #2"	N/A	0:41
13.	"Merry Prankster"		2:33
14.	"Pump Effect"	N/A	0:05
15.	"Want You to Know"		3:02
Total length:			34:43

== Personnel ==
None of the band members are credited on official releases. The following are members who likely featured on the album based on the cover photo and work on previous albums.

Rotary Connection

- Minnie Riperton – vocals
- Bobby Simms – guitar
- Jon Stocklin – guitar
- Mitch Aliotta – bass, vocals
- Sidney Barnes – vocals
- Tom Donlinger – drums

Additional personnel

- Charles Stepney – arrangement, production
- Marshall Chess – production
- Robb Baker – liner notes
- Stu Black – engineering
- Dick Fowler – art direction
- Mel Kasper – photography
- Dick LaPalm – supervision

== See also ==
- List of 1970 albums
