= Sidney Barnes (disambiguation) =

Sidney Barnes (1916–1973) was an Australian cricketer and cricket writer.

Sidney or Sydney Barnes may also refer to:

- Sidney Barnes (musician) (born 1941), American singer and songwriter
- Sydney Barnes (1873–1967), English cricketer
