= The Piano Player (Ramsey Lewis album) =

Studio album by Ramsey Lewis
- Released: March 1970
- Recorded: November 1969
- Studios: Ter Mar Studios, Chicago
- Genre: Jazz
- Label: Cadet
- Producers: Charles Stepney, Ramsey Lewis, Richard Evans

Ramsey Lewis chronology
Another Voyage (1969)	The Piano Player (1970)	Them Changes (1970)

The Piano Player is a jazz album by Ramsey Lewis, released in March 1970 on Cadet Records. The album reached No. 9 on the US Billboard Best Selling Jazz LPs chart.

== Overview ==
The Piano Player was produced by Charles Stepney, Ramsey Lewis and Richard Evans and arranged by Stepney with Evans. The album was also recorded during November 1969 at Ter Mar Studios, Chicago.

== Critical reception ==
Professional ratings
Review scores
Source	Rating
MusicHound Jazz	(favourable)

According to MusicHound Jazz, "The fourth collaboration between Ramsey Lewis and Charles Stepney...has yet to be reissued in the CD format, but it was their best."

== Track listing ==
=== Side 1 ===
1. "The Distant Dreamer" (Stevie Wonder)
2. "A Rainy Day in Centerville" (Charles Stepney)
3. "Everybody's Talkin'" (Fred Neil)
4. "Didn't We" (Jimmy Webb)
5. "Whenever, Wherever" (Charles Stepney)

=== Side 2 ===
1. "Close Your Eyes and Remember" (Charles Stepney)
2. "You've Made Me So Very Happy" (Berry Gordy, Frank Wilson, Brenda Holloway, Patrice Holloway)
3. "The Love I Feel for You" (Cleveland Eaton)
4. "Time and Space" (Richard Evans)
5. "Golden Slumbers" (John Lennon, Paul McCartney)
6. "Do I Love Her" (Sylvia Moy, Stevie Wonder)

== Personnel ==
- Cleveland Eaton - bass
- Ramsey Lewis - piano, keyboards
- Maurice White - drums

== Charts ==
Chart	Peak position
US Billboard Best Selling Jazz LPs	9
US Billboard 200	157
