= Step on Step =

Compilation album by Charles Stepney
- Released: September 9, 2022
- Length: 77:46
- Label: International Anthem
- Producer: Eibur Stepney; Charlene Stepney; Chanté Stepney

Charles Stepney chronology
| Step on Step (2022) | Eternal Journey (2026) |

Singles from Step on Step
- 1. "Step on Step" Released: March 23, 2022; 2. "Daddy's Diddies" Released: May 11, 2022

Step on Step is a compilation album by American musician Charles Stepney. It was released posthumously on September 9, 2022, through International Anthem Recording Company.

== Background ==
Charles Stepney was an American arranger, record producer, multi-instrumentalist, and songwriter from Chicago. Step on Step is a compilation of previously unreleased Stepney demos, consisting of 23 tracks. It serves as the official debut for him as a solo artist.

Stepney died in 1976 at the age of 45. Before his death, he intended to release a solo album. He left behind 90 reels of unreleased solo material. They were recorded in his Chicago home studio, as four-track demos. After his death, his daughters Eibur, Charlene, and Chanté uncovered the tapes.

Step on Step was released on September 9, 2022, through International Anthem Recording Company.

== Critical reception ==
Professional ratings
Review scores
| Source | Rating |
|---|---|
| AllMusic | 4.5/5 stars |
| Mojo | 3/5 stars |
| Pitchfork | 8.0/10 |
| Record Collector | 4/5 stars |
| Spectrum Culture | 80% |

Andrew Male of Mojo commented that "It's the music equivalent of finding a great author's journals or an artist's sketchbook." He added, "It feels vital, personal, vulnerable but also incomplete." Paul Bowler of Record Collector wrote, "Accompanied by spoken word reminiscences from his daughters, it makes for an illuminating insight into the working methods of a musical genius."

=== Accolades ===
Year-end lists for Step on Step
| Publication | List | Rank | Ref. |
|---|---|---|---|
| AllMusic | Favorite Archival Releases | — | |
| Bandcamp Daily | The Best Albums of 2022 | — | |

== Track listing ==
All tracks are written by Charles Stepney, except where noted.

Step on Step track listing
| No. | Title | Writer(s) | Length |
|---|---|---|---|
| 1. | "Roll Tape" | — | 0:19 |
| 2. | "Gimme Some Sugar" | | 2:33 |
| 3. | "Daddy's Diddies" | | 2:00 |
| 4. | "Gotta Dig It to Dig It" | | 3:31 |
| 5. | "No Credit for This" | | 3:29 |
| 6. | "Roadtrip" | | 5:18 |
| 7. | "On Your Face" | Stepney; Maurice White; Philip Bailey | 2:39 |
| 8. | "That's the Way of the World" | Stepney; White | 4:22 |
| 9. | "Imagination" | Stepney; White; Bailey | 5:52 |
| 10. | "In the Basement" | | 5:12 |
| 11. | "Business" | | 1:24 |
| 12. | "Look B4U Leap" | | 5:58 |
| 13. | "Around the House" | | 4:14 |
| 14. | "Funky Sci Fi" | | 4:10 |
| 15. | "Mini Mugg" | | 2:26 |
| 16. | "Chicago Independent" | | 1:31 |
| 17. | "Surround Stereo" | — | 0:46 |
| 18. | "Black Gold" | | 2:56 |
| 19. | "Denim Groove" | | 4:13 |
| 20. | "Notes from Dad" | | 4:40 |
| 21. | "Rubie & Charles" | | 4:42 |
| 22. | "Greatness" | | 1:29 |
| 23. | "Step on Step" | | 4:02 |
| Total length: | | | 77:46 |

== Personnel ==
Credits adapted from liner notes.

- Charles Stepney – performance, recording
- Eibur Stepney – production, narration
- Charlene Stepney – production, narration
- Chanté Stepney – production, narration
- Scott McNiece – editing, sequencing
- Dave Vettraino – additional recording, treatment, mixing
- David Allen – mastering
- Rubie Stepney – photography
- Ayana Contreras – liner notes
- Craig Hansen – design, layout

== Charts ==
Chart performance for Step on Step
| Chart (2022) | Peak position |
|---|---|
| UK Album Downloads (OCC) | 25 |
| UK Independent Albums (OCC) | 19 |
