= Charles Stepney =

American record producer

- Born: March 26, 1931; Chicago, Illinois, U.S.
- Died: May 17, 1976 (aged 45) Chicago, Illinois, U.S.
- Genres: Soul; R&B
- Occupations: Record producer; arranger; conductor
- Instruments: Vibraphone; piano; keyboards; guitar; drums
- Years active: 1957–1976
- Labels: Chess; Columbia

Charles Stepney (March 26, 1931 – May 17, 1976) was an American record producer, arranger, songwriter and musician. Stepney is noted for his work with artists such as The Dells, Ramsey Lewis, Rotary Connection, and Earth, Wind & Fire.

== Career ==
Charles Stepney started his musical career as a jazz musician and vibraphone player, and began work for Chess Records as a musician and arranger. In 1966, he and Marshall Chess, son of Chess Records' co-founder Leonard Chess, established a new soul rock band called the Rotary Connection. Stepney was eventually appointed as the band's producer, to appear on Chess' subsidiary label Cadet Records. He went on to produce their 1967 self titled debut album and Aladdin, their 1968 follow up release. As well as 1968's Peace and their 1969 album Songs. He also produced the group's 1970 album Dinner Music and 1971 LP Hey, Love. Paul Bowler of Record Collector proclaimed, "The six albums that Rotary Connection recorded under Stepney's guidance proved revolutionary; a glorious fusion of styles made essential by the simpatico nature of Stepney's lush string arrangements and [Minnie] Riperton's multi-octave, quasi-operatic vocals." Stepney went on to produce Rotary Connection lead singer Minnie Riperton's 1970 debut album Come to My Garden. In a November 1970 interview with DownBeat, Stepney exclaimed Minnie "has a soprano range of about four octaves, a whole lot of soul, she's good-looking and she's got the experience of Rotary behind her."

What's more he produced soul group The Dells on their 1968 album There Is, 1969 release Love Is Blue and their 1971 LPs Like It Is, Like It Was, and Freedom Means. Stepney also produced blues musician Muddy Waters' 1968 album Electric Mud and his 1969 release After the Rain. As well Howlin' Wolf's 1969 LP The Howlin' Wolf Album and Marlena Shaw's 1969 album The Spice of Life. Along with Phil Upchurch's 1969 album Upchurch and 1970 LP The Way I Feel. Stepney later produced Terry Callier on his albums Occasional Rain (1972), What Color Is Love (1973) and I Just Can't Help Myself (1974).

Stepney began to collaborate with Ramsey Lewis as a producer on his 1968 LP Maiden Voyage. The album included the song "Les Fleur" written by Stepney and later recorded by Riperton in 1970. He also arranged on the Trio's 1968 album Mother Nature's Son and 1969 LP Another Voyage, and co-produced the 1970 album The Piano Player. With the Trio was a young drummer named Maurice White who previously worked as a session musician at Chess Records. White went on to found and lead a new band called Earth, Wind & Fire. Stepney eventually worked as an associate producer on the band's 1974 album Open Our Eyes. He then performed on Lewis' 1974 album Sun Goddess and produced his 1975 LP Don't It Feel Good. Stepney also coproduced with White, Earth, Wind & Fire's 1975 albums That's the Way of the World and Gratitude. Thereafter with White he started producing EWF's 1976 album Spirit, Lewis' 1976 LP Salongo, The Emotions 1976 album Flowers and Deniece Williams's 1976 LP This Is Niecy.

== Death ==
On the morning of May 17, 1976, Earth, Wind & Fire's Maurice White spoke with Stepney about a new song the band had written in tribute to Stepney, titled "Spirit". Stepney died of a heart attack later that day.

== Influence and legacy ==
Artists such as Ramsey Lewis, Stevie Wonder, Deniece Williams, Chaka Khan, 4hero, Jean-Paul 'Bluey' Maunick, Zero 7, Marc Mac and Terry Callier have been influenced by Stepney.

Step on Step, a compilation of previously unreleased Stepney demos, was released in 2022 through International Anthem Recording Company.

== Personal life ==
Stepney was survived by his wife Rubie and three daughters Eibur, Charlene, and Chante.

== Discography ==
=== Compilation albums ===
- Step on Step (International Anthem, 2022)
- Eternal Journey (BGP, 2026)

=== As producer or co-producer ===
- The Dells – There Is (Cadet, 1968)
- Muddy Waters – Electric Mud (Cadet Concept, 1968)
- Howlin' Wolf – The Howlin' Wolf Album (Cadet Concept, 1969)
- Marlena Shaw – The Spice of Life (Cadet, 1969)
- Minnie Riperton – Come to My Garden (GRT, 1970)
- Terry Callier – Occasional Rain (Cadet, 1972)
- Terry Callier – What Color Is Love (Cadet, 1973)
- Earth, Wind & Fire – Open Our Eyes (Columbia, 1974)
- Earth, Wind & Fire – That's the Way of the World (Columbia, 1975)
- Earth, Wind & Fire – Gratitude (Columbia, 1975)
- The Emotions – Flowers (Columbia, 1976)
- Deniece Williams – This Is Niecy (Columbia, 1976)
- Earth, Wind & Fire – Spirit (Columbia, 1976)
- Ramsey Lewis - Salongo (Columbia,1976)

=== As performer in Rotary Connection ===
- Rotary Connection (Cadet, 1967)
- Aladdin (Cadet, 1968)
- Peace (Cadet, 1968)
- Songs (Cadet, 1969)
- Dinner Music (Cadet, 1970)
- Hey, Love (Cadet, 1971)

=== As sideman ===
With Bunky Green

- Playin' for Keeps (Cadet, 1966)

With Eddie Harris

- Jazz for "Breakfast at Tiffany's" (Vee-Jay, 1961)
- For Bird and Bags (Exodus, 1963)
- Groovin' with the Soulful Strings (Cadet, 1967)
- Plug Me In (Atlantic, 1968)

With Ramsey Lewis

- Back to the Roots (Cadet, 1971)
- Sun Goddess (Columbia, 1974)

With Muddy Waters

- Electric Mud (Cadet Concept, 1968)

=== As arranger ===
With Eddie Harris

- Plug Me In (Atlantic, 1968)

With Ramsey Lewis

- Maiden Voyage (Cadet, 1968)
- Mother Nature's Son (Cadet, 1968)

With Minnie Riperton

- Come to My Garden (GRT, 1970)

With Rotary Connection

- Rotary Connection (Cadet, 1968)
- Aladdin (Cadet, 1968)
- Peace (Cadet, 1968)
- Dinner Music (Cadet, 1970)
- Hey, Love (Cadet, 1971)

== See also ==
- Albums produced by Charles Stepney
