= Rotary Connection (album) =

Studio album by Rotary Connection
- Released: February 1968
- Length: 36:08
- Label: Chess; Cadet; MCA
- Producer: Marshall Chess, Charles Stepney

Rotary Connection chronology
Rotary Connection (1968)	Aladdin (1968)

Rotary Connection is the debut album of the American psychedelic soul band Rotary Connection. It was released in 1968 on Cadet Concept Records. The album rose to No. 37 on the Billboard 200 chart.

== Critical reception ==
Professional ratings
Review scores
Source	Rating
Allmusic	4/5 stars
Billboard	Favorable

== Track listing ==
All tracks written by Marshall Paul and Charles Stepney unless otherwise stated.

1. "Amen" – 4:03
2. "Rapid Transit" – 0:38
3. "Turn Me On" (Sidney Barnes, Greg Perry) – 3:19
4. "Pink Noise" – 0:22
5. "Lady Jane" (Mick Jagger, Keith Richards) – 5:00
6. "Like a Rolling Stone" (Bob Dylan) – 4:51
7. "Soul Man" (Isaac Hayes, David Porter) – 3:01
8. "Sursum Mentes" – 0:43
9. "Didn't Want to Have to Do It" (John Sebastian) – 3:11
10. "Black Noise" – 0:22
11. "Memory Band" (Richard Rudolph, Stepney) – 3:20
12. "Ruby Tuesday" (Jagger, Richards) – 4:27
13. "Rotary Connection" – 2:51

== Personnel ==
Rotary Connection

- Mitch Aliotta – vocals (lead vocals on "Lady Jane" and "Soul Man")
- Minnie Riperton – vocals (lead vocals on "Memory Band")
- Sidney Barnes – vocals
- Bobby Simms – vocals (lead vocals on "Amen", "Turn Me On" and "Didn't Want to Have to Do It")
- Kenny Venegas – vocals
- Judy Hauff – vocals (lead vocals on "Amen", "Turn Me On", "Lady Jane", "Like a Rolling Stone", "Soul Man" and "Ruby Tuesday")
- Charles Stepney – keyboards
- Marshall Chess – Theremin

Additional musicians

- Bill Bradley – electronic effects
- David Chausow – leader
- Bobby Christian – guitar
- Pete Cosey – guitar
- Morris Jennings – drums
- Louis Satterfield – bass
- Phil Upchurch – bass
- Chuck Barksdale – bass vocals

Technical personnel

- Marshall Chess – producer
- Doug Brand – engineer
- Andy McKaie – reissue producer
- Mark Omann – remastering
- Charles Stepney – arranger, producer
- Curt Cole Burkhart – photography
- Robert Pruter – liner notes

== Charts ==
Chart performance for Rotary Connection
Year	Chart	Peak
1968	Pop Albums	#37
