= The Movie Album =

The Movie Album may refer to:

- The Movie Album (Barbra Streisand album), 2003
- The Movie Album (Ramsey Lewis album), 1966
- The Movie Album: As Time Goes By, a 1998 album by Neil Diamond

== See also ==
- Soundtrack album, an album that incorporates music from the soundtrack of a particular feature film
