= Mother Nature's Son (album) =

Mother Nature’s Son

Studio album by Ramsey Lewis
- Released: 1968
- Genre: Jazz
- Length: 40:24
- Labels: Cadet; LPS-821
- Producer: Charles Stepney

Ramsey Lewis chronology
| Maiden Voyage (1968) | Mother Nature’s Son (1968) | Ramsey Lewis Live in Tokyo (1968) |

Mother Nature's Son is a studio album recorded by Ramsey Lewis which was released on Cadet Records in 1968. The album peaked at No. 3 on the Billboard Top Jazz Albums chart and No. 10 on the Billboard Top Soul Albums chart.

== Overview ==
Mother Nature's Son was produced by Charles Stepney and consists of ten instrumental versions of songs from the Beatles' album The Beatles, also known as "the White Album".

== Recording ==
The album was recorded at Ter Mar Studio, Chicago, in December 1968, a short time after the 22 November 1968 release of The Beatles album. It was recorded live with members from the Chicago Symphony Orchestra with Lewis on piano. Offering a potential clue as to why Lewis had recorded an album of Beatles songs, producer and arranger Charles Stepney expressed his admiration for the sounds achieved by Beatles producer George Martin in a 1970 interview with Down Beat. Lewis in Mojo magazine said "I wasn't a Beatles fan. I'd recorded A Hard Day's Night, Day Tripper and And I Love Her before, but I didn't really get them. But my producer Charles Stepney told me to think about doing a Beatles covers album. I didn't think that they had enough songs to do an entire album but he gave me a copy of the White Album and told me to listen. I did, but couldn't see how I could do anything with it. He was like 'You didn't really listen.' So he arranged a few songs for me and then it was, I get it now." In the Down Beat interview Lewis said that he produced the "electronic texture" effect on the album using the Moog synthesizer, an instrument he anticipated "working with for about 10 years". During the following year the Beatles used the Moog synthesizer in the recording of their final studio album, Abbey Road.

== Cover art ==
The album cover was designed by Jerry Griffith and depicts Lewis sitting at a grand piano in a tropical garden feeding a rabbit with his right hand while holding another rabbit with his left.

== Critical reception ==
Professional ratings
Review scores
| Source | Rating |
|---|---|
| Allmusic | 3/5 stars |
| Wax Poetics | (favourable) |

Bruce Eder of Allmusic called the album "an enjoyable excursion".

== Track listing ==
All tracks are written by Lennon–McCartney.

Side 1
| No. | Title | Length |
|---|---|---|
| 1. | "Mother Nature's Son" | 4:55 |
| 2. | "Rocky Raccoon" | 2:39 |
| 3. | "Julia" | 4:20 |
| 4. | "Back in the U.S.S.R." | 3:16 |
| 5. | "Dear Prudence" | 4:55 |

Side 2
| No. | Title | Length |
|---|---|---|
| 6. | "Cry Baby Cry" | 3:51 |
| 7. | "Good Night" | 5:55 |
| 8. | "Everybody's Got Something to Hide Except Me and My Monkey" | 3:14 |
| 9. | "Sexy Sadie" | 2:45 |
| 10. | "Blackbird" | 4:34 |
| Total length: | | 40:24 |

== Personnel ==
- Ramsey Lewis – keyboards
- Cleveland Eaton – double bass
- Maurice White – drums
- Charles Stepney – producer, conductor, orchestra arrangement, Moog synthesizer
- Ron Malo – engineer
- Ray Komorski – photography
- Jerry Griffith – cover design
- Marshall Chess – album supervision
- Woodwind amplification by MAESTRO, Chicago musical instrumental company, Lincolnwood, Illinois

== Charts ==
| Chart | Peak position |
|---|---|
| US Billboard Best Selling Jazz LPs | 3 |
| US Billboard Best Selling Soul LP's | 10 |
| US Billboard Top LPs | 156 |
