= Goin' Latin =

Studio album by Ramsey Lewis
- Released: February 1967
- Recorded: December 21–23, 1966
- Genre: Jazz
- Label: Cadet
- Producer: Esmond Edwards

Ramsey Lewis chronology
Wade in the Water (1966)	Goin' Latin (1967)	The Movie Album (1967)

Professional ratings
Review scores
Source	Rating
Allmusic	3/5 stars

Goin' Latin is a studio jazz album with Latin percussion and style by Ramsey Lewis which was released by Cadet Records in 1967. The album reached No. 2 on the Billboard Jazz Albums chart and No. 16 on the Billboard Soul Albums chart.

== Critical reception ==
Thom Jurek of Allmusic noted Richard Evans' "arrangements and bottom-heavy soulful sound mix well with Lewis' indulgence in bossa nova, discotheque boogaloo, and Latin soul-lite on this set."

== Track listing ==
=== Side 1 ===
1. "Hey, Mrs. Jones" (Marion Miller, Robert L. Reagan) 4:01
2. "Summer Samba" (Marcos Valle, Norman Gimbel, Paulo Sérgio Valle) 3:09
3. "One, Two, Three" (David White, John Medora, Leonard Borisoff) 3:26
4. "Free Again" (Joss Baselli, Armand Canfora, Robert Colby, Michel Jourdan) 2:56
5. "Down by the Riverside" (Traditional; adapted by Esmond Edwards) 3:43

=== Side 2 ===
1. "Blue Bongo" (Richard Evans) — 4:19
2. "I'll Wait for You" (Richard Evans) — 3:17
3. "Function at the Junction" (Edward Holland, Jr., Shorty Long, Lamont Dozier) — 3:04
4. "Spanish Grease" (Willie Bobo, Melvin Lastie) — 3:11
5. "Lara's Theme (Somewhere My Love)" [from Doctor Zhivago] (Maurice Jarre, Paul Francis Webster) — 2:36
6. "Cast Your Fate to the Wind" (Vince Guaraldi) — 3:12

== Charts ==
Year	Chart	Position
1967	Billboard Soul Albums	16
1967	Billboard Jazz Albums	2
1967	Billboard 200	95

Year	Single	Chart	Position
1967	"One, Two, Three"	Billboard Hot 100	67

== Personnel ==
- Cleveland Eaton - Bass
- Ramsey Lewis - Piano, Keyboards
- Maurice White - Drums
- Doug Brand - Supervising Engineer
- Don Bronstein - Photography
- Brian Christian - Engineer
- Esmond Edwards - Producer, Adaptation, Supervisor
- Richard Evans - Arranger
- Tom Gorman - Cover Design
- Hollis King - Art Direction
- Erick Labson - Mastering
- Andy McKaie - Reissue Supervisor
- Shigeo Miyamoto - Mastering
- Cameron Mizell - Production Coordination
- Isabelle Wong - Design
