= Maiden Voyage (Ramsey Lewis album) =

Studio album by Ramsey Lewis
- Released: July 1968
- Recorded: April 1968
- Studios: Universal Recording Studio, Chicago
- Genre: Jazz
- Labels: Cadet; LPS-811
- Producer: Richard Evans

Ramsey Lewis chronology
Up Pops Ramsey Lewis (1967)	Maiden Voyage (1968)	Mother Nature's Son (1968)

Maiden Voyage is an album by jazz pianist Ramsey Lewis which was recorded in 1968 and released on the Cadet label. The album peaked at No. 3 on the US Billboard Best Selling Jazz LPs and No. 14 on the US Billboard Best Selling Soul LPs charts.

== Covers ==
Lewis recorded covers of Dionne Warwick's "Do You Know The Way to San Jose", The Beatles' "Lady Madonna" and Herbie Hancock's "Maiden Voyage" for the album.

== Track listing ==
1. "Maiden Voyage" (Herbie Hancock) - 4:45
2. "Mighty Quinn" (Bob Dylan) - 3:10
3. "Sweet Rain" (Mike Gibbs) - 3:00
4. "Lady Madonna" (John Lennon, Paul McCartney) - 2:25
5. "Do You Know the Way to San Jose" (Burt Bacharach, Hal David) - 3:40
6. "Ode" (Charles Stepney) - 4:40
7. "Les Fleur" (Stepney) - 4:35
8. "Since You've Been Gone" (Aretha Franklin, Ted White) - 2:55
9. "In The Heat of the Night" (Quincy Jones) - 3:47
10. "Afro-Boogaloo Twist" (Cleveland Eaton) - 2:30
11. "Only When I'm Dreaming" (Stepney, Alex Dino) - 3:55
12. "Eternal Journey" (Stepney, Ramsey Lewis) - 6:26

== Personnel ==
- Ramsey Lewis – piano
- Cleveland Eaton – bass, arranger
- Maurice White – drums
- Charles Stepney – arranger

== Charts ==
Chart	Peak position
US Billboard Best Selling Jazz LPs	3
US Billboard Best Selling Soul LP's	14
US Billboard Top LPs	55
