= Dancing in the Street (album) =

Live album by Ramsey Lewis Trio
- Released: October 1967
- Recorded: July 1967
- Venues: Basin Street West, San Francisco, California
- Genre: Jazz
- Length: 49:50
- Label: Cadet
- Producer: Esmond Edwards

Ramsey Lewis chronology
The Movie Album (1967)	Dancing in the Street (1967)	Up Pops Ramsey Lewis (1968)

Professional ratings
Review scores
Source	Rating
Allmusic	4/5 stars

Dancing in the Street is a live album by jazz group the Ramsey Lewis Trio released in 1967 on Cadet Records. The album got to No. 3 on the Billboard Top Jazz Albums chart and No. 16 on the Billboard Hot R&B LPs chart.

== Overview ==
Produced by Esmond Edwards, Dancing in the Street was recorded at famed jazz nightclub Basin Street West, San Francisco in July 1967.

== Critical reception ==
Amy Hanson of Allmusic noted a "somewhat formative vibe that makes this particular performance such a complete and utter joy. Dancing in the Street is this trio's recorded debut and, across a wide range of covers and styles, it's a captivating portrait of contemporary jazz."

== Singles ==
The album's title track, a cover of Martha and the Vandellas' Dancing in the Street rose to No. 36 on the Billboard Adult Contemporary Songs chart.

== Track listing ==
=== Side 1 ===
No.	Title	Writer(s)	Length
1.	"Dancing in the Street"	Marvin Gaye, William "Mickey" Stevenson, Ivy Jo Hunter	5:05
2.	"Mood for Mendes"	Billy Taylor	3:06
3.	"Struttin' Lightly"	Cleveland Eaton	4:48
4.	"You Don't Know Me"	Cindy Walker, Eddy Arnold	4:48
5.	"Django"	John Lewis	4:50

=== Side 2 ===
No.	Title	Writer(s)	Length
1.	"Black Orpheus Medley: Manha Da Carnaval/Felicidade/Samba de Orfeu"	Luiz Bonfá	8:27
2.	"What Now My Love"	Gilbert Bécaud	8:27
3.	"Quiet Nights of Quiet Stars (Corcovado)"	Antônio Carlos Jobim	3:39

== Personnel ==
- Cleveland Eaton - bass
- Ramsey Lewis - piano, keyboards
- Maurice White - drums

== Charts ==
Album –
Year	Chart	Position
1967	US Billboard Top Soul Albums	16
1967	US Billboard Top Jazz Albums	3
1967	US Billboard 200	59

Singles – Billboard
Year	Single	Chart	Position
1967	"Dancing In The Street"	Adult Contemporary Songs	36
