= The Spice of Life (Marlena Shaw album) =

Studio album by Marlena Shaw
- Released: November 1969
- Recorded: February & July 1969
- Studios: Ter Mar Studios, Chicago, Illinois
- Genres: Soul, jazz
- Label: Cadet (LPS-833)
- Producers: Richard Evans, Charles Stepney

Marlena Shaw chronology
Out of Different Bags (1967)	The Spice of Life (1969)	Marlena (1972)

The Spice of Life is the second album by Marlena Shaw. It was her last studio album with Cadet Records and contains her famous version of the Ashford & Simpson song "California Soul" and first cover of "Go Away Little Boy."

== Track listing ==
1. "Woman of the Ghetto" (Bobby Miller, Marlena Shaw, Richard Evans) 6:02
2. "Call it Stormy Monday" (T-Bone Walker) 3:01
3. "Where Can I Go?" (Leo Fuld, Sigment Berland, Sonny Miller) 2:21
4. "I'm Satisfied" (Morris Dollison) 2:48
5. "I Wish I Knew (How It Would Feel To Be Free)" (Billy Taylor, Dick Dallas) 3:12
6. "Liberation Conversation" (Bobby Miller, Marlena Shaw) 2:03
7. "California Soul" (Nickolas Ashford, Valerie Simpson) 2:59
8. "Go Away Little Boy" (Gerry Goffin, Carole King) 2:45
9. "Looking Through the Eyes of Love" (Barry Mann, Cynthia Weil) 3:00
10. "Anyone Can Move a Mountain" (Johnny Marks) 3:03

(Note: times are taken from the original album sleeve.)

Bonus tracks on Chess Legendary Master Series (2CD set with Out of Different Bags, also with bonus tracks)

- 11. "Mercy, Mercy, Mercy"
- 12. "Waiting for Charlie to Come Home"
- 13. "The House that Jack Built"
- 14. "Brother, Where are You?"
- 15. "We Could Have Been Fine"

=== Technical personnel ===
- Arranged & produced by: Richard Evans & Charles Stepney
- Recordings engineers: Stu Black & Dave Purple
- Album supervision: Bobby Miller
- Cover photo: Bob Crawford
- Album design: Jerry Griffith

Additional AllMusic credits

- Nick Ashford – Composer
- Ken Druker – Executive Producer
- Gerry Goffin – Composer
- Bob Irwin – Reissue Mastering
- Carole King – Composer
- Hollis King – Reissue Art Director
- Bryan Koniarz – Reissue Producer
- Johnny Marks – Composer
- Loonis McGlohon – Liner Notes
- Bobby Miller – Composer
- Bobby Lee Miller – Album Supervision
- Jayme Pieruzzi – Reissue Mastering
- Valerie Simpson – Composer
- Charles Stephens – Arranger
- T-Bone Walker – Composer
