= Up Pops Ramsey Lewis =

Studio album by Ramsey Lewis
- Released: February 1968
- Recorded: July and October 1967
- Studios: Ter Mar Recording Studio, Chicago, Illinois
- Genre: Jazz
- Length: 32:49
- Label: Cadet
- Producer: Richard Evans

Ramsey Lewis chronology
Dancing in the Street (1967)	Up Pops Ramsey Lewis (1968)	Maiden Voyage (1968)

Up Pops Ramsey Lewis is an album by pianist Ramsey Lewis which was issued in February 1968 on Cadet Records. The album reached No. 7 on the US Billboard Best Selling Jazz LPs and No. 25 on the Billboard Best Selling Soul LPs charts.

== Reception ==
Professional ratings
Review scores
Source	Rating
AllMusic	2/5 stars
Record Mirror	4/5 stars

AllMusic gave the album a 2/5 stars rating. With a 4/5 stars rating, Norman Jopling and Peter Jones of Record Mirror declared, "Ramsey gives his own distinctive jazz piano stylings to these soul-tinged pop tunes (hence the title kiddies) and makes a very good job of them."

== Track listing ==
1. "Soul Man" (David Porter, Isaac Hayes) - 2:50
2. "The Look of Love" (Burt Bacharach, Hal David) - 4:22
3. "Respect" (Otis Redding) - 3:00
4. "Goin' Out of My Head" (Teddy Randazzo, Bobby Weinstein) - 3:42
5. "Party Time" (Richard Evans) - 3:40
6. "Bear Mash" (Evans) - 3:00
7. "I Was Made to Love Her" (Henry Cosby, Sylvia Moy, Lula Mae Hardaway, Stevie Wonder) - 3:15
8. "Alfie" (Bacharach, David) - 2:45
9. "Why Am I Treated So Bad" (Roebuck Staples) - 2:50
10. "Jade East" (Evans) - 3:25

== Personnel ==
- Ramsey Lewis - piano
- Cleveland Eaton - bass
- Maurice White - drums
- Orchestra arranged and conducted by Richard Evans

== Charts ==
Chart	Peak position
US Billboard Best Selling Jazz LPs	7
US Billboard Best Selling Soul LP's	25
US Billboard Top LPs	52
