= Maurice White =

American musician (1941–2016)

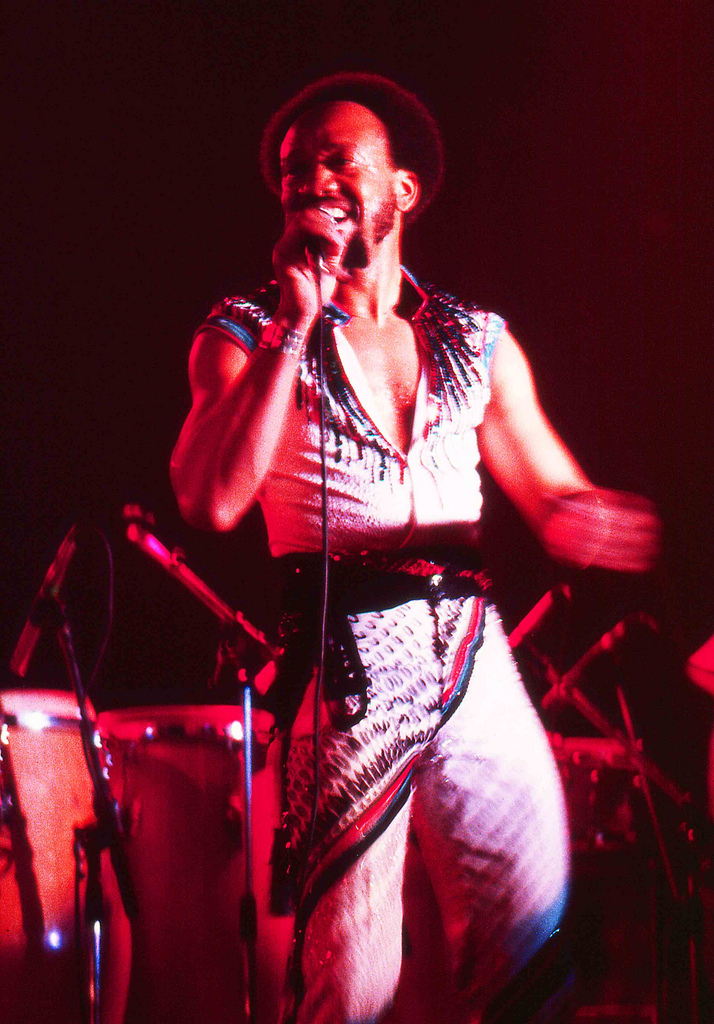
- White performing in 1982

Background information
- Born: December 19, 1941; Memphis, Tennessee, U.S.
- Origin: Chicago, Illinois, U.S.
- Died: February 4, 2016 (aged 74) Los Angeles, California, U.S.
- Genres: Soul; funk; R&B; jazz
- Occupations: Singer; musician; songwriter; record producer
- Instruments: Vocals; drums; kalimba
- Years active: 1962–2016
- Labels: Columbia; Kalimba Music
- Spouse: Marilyn White (m. 1970)
- Website: mauricewhite.com

Maurice White (December 19, 1941 – February 4, 2016) was an American musician, best known as the founder, leader, main songwriter and chief producer of the band Earth, Wind & Fire, also serving as the band's co-lead singer with Philip Bailey.

Described as a "visionary" by Vibe and a "mastermind" by Variety, White was nominated for a total of 22 Grammys, of which he won seven. He was inducted into the Rock and Roll Hall of Fame and the Vocal Group Hall of Fame as a member of Earth, Wind & Fire, and was also inducted individually into the Songwriters Hall of Fame. White also worked with musical acts such as Deniece Williams, Cher, The Emotions, Barbra Streisand, Ramsey Lewis, and Neil Diamond.

== Biography ==
=== Early career ===
Maurice White was born in Memphis, Tennessee, on December 19, 1941. He grew up in South Memphis, where he lived with an elderly neighbor Mrs. Robinson in the Foote Homes Projects and was a childhood friend of Booker T. Jones and David Porter. Along with Jones, White formed a "cookin' little band" while attending Booker T. Washington High School. He also made frequent trips to Chicago to visit his mother, Edna Parker, and stepfather, Dr. Verdine Adams, who was a doctor and occasional saxophonist. During his teenage years, White moved to Chicago where he studied at the Chicago Conservatory of Music, and played drums in local nightclubs. In 1962 he joined The Jazzmen, a student jazz trio at Crane Junior College in Chicago, Illinois formed by Louis Satterfield on trombone, Charles Handy on trumpet, and Don Myrick on alto saxophone. The Jazzmen later became the Pharaohs. Satterfield, White, and Handy became studio musicians at Chess Records in Chicago. At Chess, he played the drums on records of Etta James, Chuck Berry, Rotary Connection, Betty Everett and Junior Wells, along with the likes of Sonny Stitt, Muddy Waters, the Impressions, the Dells, Willie Dixon, Sugar Pie DeSanto and Buddy Guy. White also played the drums on Fontella Bass's "Rescue Me" (with Satterfield on bass), Billy Stewart's, "Summertime", Betty Everett's You're No Good and Little Milton's We're Gonna Make It".

In June 1966, he left Chess and the Pharaohs to join the Ramsey Lewis Trio, replacing Isaac "Red" Holt as the group's drummer. Holt and bassist Eldee Young left to form Young-Holt Unlimited. Young was also replaced by Cleveland Eaton. As a member of the Trio, Maurice first played on 1966's Wade in the Water. A song from that album called "Hold It Right There" won a Grammy Award for Best Rhythm & Blues Group Performance, Vocal or Instrumental. White later played the drums on 1966's The Movie Album along with 1967's Dancing in the Street and Goin' Latin. He also performed on the Trio's 1968 LPs Up Pops Ramsey Lewis, Mother Nature's Son and Maiden Voyage. Around this time, he encountered the African thumb piano (kalimba), in a Chicago drum store. A tune entitled "Uhuru", from the Trio's 1969 album Another Voyage, marks the first recording of White playing the kalimba.

In 1969, White joined his two friends, Wade Flemons and Don Whitehead, to form a songwriting team who wrote songs for commercials in the Chicago area. The three friends got a recording contract with Capitol Records and called themselves the Salty Peppers. They had a moderate hit in the Midwest area with their single "La La Time", but their second single, "Uh Huh Yeah", was not as successful. White then left the trio, moved from Chicago to Los Angeles, and altered the name of the band to Earth, Wind & Fire. With the band's new name reflecting the elements in his own astrological chart.

=== Earth, Wind & Fire ===
Along with being the leader, Maurice also performed as co-lead singer and produced most of the group's albums. EWF eventually became one of the most acclaimed bands of all time, winning six Grammy Awards out of 17 nominations. The group was bestowed with a star on the Hollywood Walk of Fame and four American Music Awards. EWF's albums have collectively sold over 90 million copies worldwide. Maurice was also inducted, with the band, into the Rock and Roll Hall of Fame, the Vocal Group Hall of Fame, The Songwriters Hall of Fame and The NAACP Image Awards Hall of Fame.

White brought a sense of eclecticism to the band's recordings, at the same time shaping their signature vibrant stage portrayals and crafting the vocal interplay between his tenor and Philip Bailey's falsetto. As a musician he aided the kalimba being brought into wider circles by incorporating its sound into the band's music. He was also responsible for the inclusion of a full horn section, at first, the Phenix Horns and later on the Earth, Wind & Fire Horns. During 1994 he halted his regular tours with the band, but still occasionally appeared on stage. White retained executive control of Earth, Wind and Fire and remained active in the music business as he produced and performed on EW&F and other musical artists' records.

Prior to the band's 2000 induction into the Rock & Roll Hall of Fame, Maurice revealed an ongoing affliction with Parkinson's disease. A website entitled Startalk.org was also established a year earlier in his honor where artists such as Steven Tyler of Aerosmith, Boyz II Men, Smokey Robinson, Isaac Hayes, Michael Jackson, Eric Clapton and Tom Morello of Rage Against the Machine posted complimentary messages. Other noted artists who posted messages were Brian McKnight, Al Jarreau, Kenny G, Seal, Chick Corea, Carly Simon and Dionne Warwick.

Along with the band White notably performed at the 2002 BET Awards and the 2004 Grammy Awards' Tribute to Funk. As well as upon stage, with EW&F and special guest Alicia Keys, at Clive Davis' 2004 pre-Grammy party where they all sang "September".

=== Deniece Williams ===
In May 1976, White & Charles Stepney were co-producing Deniece Williams' debut album This Is Niecy when Stepney died unexpectedly during the sessions. Maurice finished producing the LP himself, which was released in August 1976 on Columbia Records. Williams was a former backup vocalist for Stevie Wonder's band Wonderlove. The album was the first for Kalimba Productions, a production company also established by White and Stepney in 1976. This Is Niecy rose to No. 3 on the US Billboard Top Soul Albums and No. 33 on the US Billboard 200 charts. A song off the LP called "Free" got to No. 25 on the US Billboard Hot 100, No. 2 on the US Billboard Hot Soul Songs chart and No. 1 on the UK Pop Singles chart. This Is Niecy has also been certified Gold in the US by the RIAA and Silver in the UK by the BPI.

Maurice also produced Williams' sophomore album Songbird, released in 1977. The album rose to No. 23 on the US Billboard Top Soul Albums chart and No. 5 on the UK Blues & Soul Top British Soul Albums chart. A single entitled "Baby, Baby My Love's All for You" got to No. 13 on the US Billboard Hot Soul Songs chart, No. 5 on the UK Blues & Soul Top British Soul Singles chart and No. 32 on the UK Pop Singles chart.

Williams later issued 1978's That's What Friends Are For on Columbia records for Kalimba Productions. She then released 1979's When Love Comes Calling on ARC Records, Maurice's subsidiary label on Columbia. Maurice featured as a guest artist on the LP, which peaked at No. 27 on the US Billboard Top Soul Albums chart. The single, "I've Got the Next Dance", also reached No. 1 on the Billboard Dance Club Play chart.

Williams thereafter issued two studio albums, being 1981's My Melody and 1982's Niecy on ARC Records. She later revealed in a 2007 interview that she "loved working with Maurice White ... he taught me the business of music, and planning and executing a plan and executing a show."

=== The Emotions ===
After Stax Records became embroiled in financial problems, the girl group the Emotions looked for a new contract and found one with Columbia Records. With Charles Stepney co-producing with White, their third studio album entitled Flowers was issued in 1976. The album got to No. 5 on the Billboard Top Soul albums chart. Flowers has also been certified Gold in the US by the RIAA.

The album's title track got to No. 16 on the Billboard Hot Soul Songs chart. Another single being "I Don't Wanna Lose Your Love" got to Nos. 4 & 13 on the Billboard Dance Club Songs and Hot Soul Songs charts respectively.

Following Charles Stepney's sudden death from a heart attack in May 1976, White took over producing the Emotions. During 1977 the group issued their follow up album Rejoice. The album reached No. 1 on the Billboard Top R&B Albums chart and No. 7 on the Billboard 200 chart. Rejoice has also been certified Platinum in the US by the RIAA.

With the LP came the single "Don't Ask My Neighbors" which got to the top ten on the Billboard R&B singles charts. Another song, "Best of My Love", reached No. 1 on the Billboard Pop and R&B charts. "Best of My Love" won a Grammy for Best R&B Performance By a Duo or Group with Vocals, and an American Music Award for Favorite Soul/R&B Single. "Best of My Love" has also been certified Platinum in the US by the RIAA.

In 1978 The Emotions released their third Columbia album, Sunbeam. The album rose to No. 12 on the Billboard Top Soul Albums chart and No. 40 on the Billboard 200 chart. An album cut called "Smile" reached No. 6 on the Billboard Hot Soul Songs chart. Sunbeam has been certified Gold in the US by the RIAA. The Emotions also received an American Music Award nomination in 1978 for Favorite Soul/R&B Band, Duo or Group.

During 1979 Earth, Wind & Fire collaborated with the Emotions on the single "Boogie Wonderland". The song reached No. 6 on the Billboard Hot 100 chart and No. 2 on the Billboard Hot Soul Songs chart. "Boogie Wonderland" has also been certified Gold in the US by the RIAA. White produced the girl group's 1979 LP Come into Our World which was released on his own Columbia imprint ARC Records. The album rose to No. 35 on the Billboard Top Soul Albums chart. A song from the LP called "What's the Name of Your Love?" also rose to No. 30 in the Billboard Hot R&B Songs chart. White went on to be Grammy nominated in the category of Producer of the Year Non-Classical.

The Emotions went on to guest upon Earth, Wind & Fire's 2003 single "All in the Way". "All in the Way" rose to No. 13 on the Billboard Adult R&B Songs chart and No. 25 on the Billboard Adult Contemporary Songs chart. This track featured upon EWF's 2003 album The Promise which was also produced by Maurice White.

=== Work with other artists ===
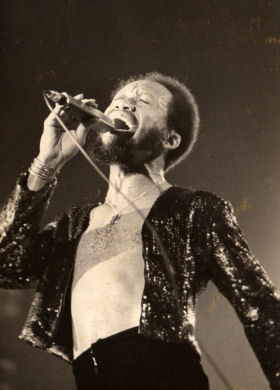
White performing in 1975

White also worked with several other famous recording artists. He played the drums on poet Shel Silverstein's album, Drain My Brain. White also played the drums on former Rotary Connection lead singer Minnie Riperton's 1970 debut album, Come to My Garden. White later co-produced Ramsey Lewis' 1974 album Sun Goddess. That album reached No. 1 on the Billboard Top Soul Albums chart and No. 12 on the Billboard Top Pop Albums chart. Sun Goddess has also been certified Gold in the US by the RIAA. Alongside Charles Stepney he also produced Lewis' 1976 LP Salongo. The album rose to No. 7 on the Billboard Jazz Albums & No. 17 on the Billboard Top Soul Albums charts.

White composed a song called Tahiti Hut with Eumir Deodato on his 1978 studio album Love Island. That album got to No. 20 on the Billboard Jazz Albums charts. White later served as the executive producer of the R&B band Pockets' album Take It On Up released in 1978 on Columbia. That album reached No. 22 on the Billboard Top R&B Albums chart. A duet with Deniece Williams called And Then featured on Weather Report's 1978 album Mr. Gone. That album was released on ARC Records, Maurice's subsidiary label at Columbia. Mr. Gone rose to No. 1 on the Billboard Jazz Albums chart. Weather Report's follow up albums 8:30, Night Passage and Weather Report were also released on ARC/Columbia.

White then appeared as a guest artist on Ramsey Lewis' 1980 LP Routes and gospel artist Walter Hawkins' 1980 Grammy nominated album The Hawkins Family. He also wrote a song called Only In Chicago with Barry Manilow on his 1980 album Barry. That album was certified Platinum in the US by the RIAA He also appeared as a guest artist on the Tubes' 1983 album Outside Inside. White later produced Jennifer Holliday's Grammy nominated 1983 LP Feel My Soul.

White went on to co-produce Barbra Streisand on her 1984 album Emotion. Emotion has been certified Platinum in the US by the RIAA. He also produced on Ramsey Lewis' 1985 album Fantasy. That album reached No. 13 on the Cashbox Jazz Albums chart. He also appeared as a guest artist on Lee Ritenour's Grammy nominated 1986 album Earth Run. White later co-produced with Lenny White Pieces of a Dream's 1986 album Joyride. This reached No. 3 on the Billboard Traditional Jazz Albums chart and No. 18 on the Billboard Top Soul Albums chart.

White also produced on Neil Diamond's 1986 album Headed for the Future. This album has been certified Gold in the US by the RIAA. He worked as a producer with Atlantic Starr on the band's 1987 LP All in the Name of Love. The album has been certified Platinum in the US by the RIAA. He then appeared a guest artist on Cher's 1987 self-titled LP. That album has been certified Platinum in the US by the RIAA. As well he performed as a percussionist and co-produced on Ramsey Lewis's 1987 album Keys to the City. That album got to No. 22 on the Billboard Top Contemporary Jazz Albums chart. White co-wrote a tune entitled "Can't Sit Down" upon jazz guitarist Stanley Jordan's 1988 album Flying Home. Alongside singer El DeBarge, he co-produced, his 1992 album In The Storm. The album got to No. 22 on the Blues & Soul Top UK Soul Albums chart.

White collaborated with the Japanese band Dreams Come True on two songs. "Wherever You Are" from their 1994 album Delicious, and "Eternity", which appeared on the soundtrack for the 1994 animated film The Swan Princess.

As well he produced on Ramsey Lewis's 1993 album Sky Islands. That album rose to No. 4 on the Billboard Contemporary Jazz Albums chart and No. 6 on the Billboard Top Jazz Albums chart. He also appeared as a guest artist on Marcus Miller's 1993 album The Sun Don't Lie. That album rose to No. 10 on the Billboard Jazz Albums chart. White went on to produce the debut album of jazz group Urban Knights released in 1995 by GRP Records. Urban Knights I featured Ramsey Lewis, percussionist Omar Hakim, trumpeter Freddie Hubbard, The Emotions and saxophonist Grover Washington, Jr. That album rose to No. 5 on the US Billboard Jazz Albums chart and No. 9 on the UK Jazz & Blues Albums chart. He also made a guest appearance on a song called Midnite by British R&B group D'Influence's 1995 album Prayer 4 Unity. "Midnite" reached No. 11 on the UK R&B Singles chart and No. 24 on the UK Dance Singles chart. During 1996 White launched his own record label dubbed Kalimba Records.

The Urban Knight's second album, Urban Knights II was again produced by Maurice. Urban Knights II featured artists such as Ramsey Lewis, Paulinho Da Costa, Verdine White, singer-songwriter and guitarist Jonathan Butler and jazz saxophonist Najee. The album got to No. 7 on the US Billboard Jazz Albums chart and No. 24 on the UK Jazz & Blues Albums chart. White also arranged on British girl group Cleopatra's 1998 album Comin' Atcha!. Comin' Atcha peaked at number 20 on the UK Pop albums chart and was certified Silver in the UK by the BPI.

White co-produced saxophonist Paul Taylor's 2000 album Undercover. The album peaked at No. 3 on the US Billboard Top Contemporary Jazz Albums chart and at No. 27 on the US Billboard Top Independent Albums chart. He also appeared as a guest artist on Jazz saxophonist Kirk Whalum's 2003 album Into My Soul. As well White collaborated with French jazz band Nojazz on tunes "Nobody Else" and "Kool" from their 2006 album Have Fun. "Kool" marked the first time White performed with his friend Stevie Wonder on record.

White later executively produced an EWF tribute album entitled Interpretations: Celebrating the Music of Earth, Wind & Fire, released in March 2007 by Stax Records. The album rose to no. 28 on the Billboard Top R&B/Hip-Hop Albums chart. On the LP were featured artists such as Chaka Khan, Musiq Soulchild, Mint Condition, Kirk Franklin and Angie Stone. Kirk Franklin's cover of "September" reached No. 17 on the Billboard Adult R&B Songs chart and No. 26 on the Billboard Hot Gospel Songs chart. As well Dwele's remake of "That's The Way Of The World" and Meshell Ndegeocello's cover of "Fantasy" were both Grammy nominated for Best Urban/Alternative Performance.

He then executively produced jazz musician Brian Culbertson's album Bringing Back The Funk, released in 2008 on GRP Records. Bringing Back the Funk rose to No. 3 on the Billboard Jazz Albums chart and No. 18 on the Top R&B/Hip Hop Albums chart. This album featured guest artists such as Ray Parker Jr., Sheldon Reynolds, Bootsy Collins, Larry Graham, Ledisi, Ronnie Laws, Musiq Soulchild, Bernie Worrell, Maceo Parker, Larry Dunn and Gerald Albright. A song from the album called "Always Remember" got to No. 1 on the Billboard Smooth Jazz Songs chart. Culbertson revealed in an interview that he is "...still in disbelief. I have learned so much from (Maurice) and he actually said that he learned a lot from me. It was incredible to work with him." Maurice also co-wrote a tune called "Eye to Eye", that eventually appeared on British soul singer Jaki Graham's 2018 album When a Woman Loves.

=== Solo albums ===
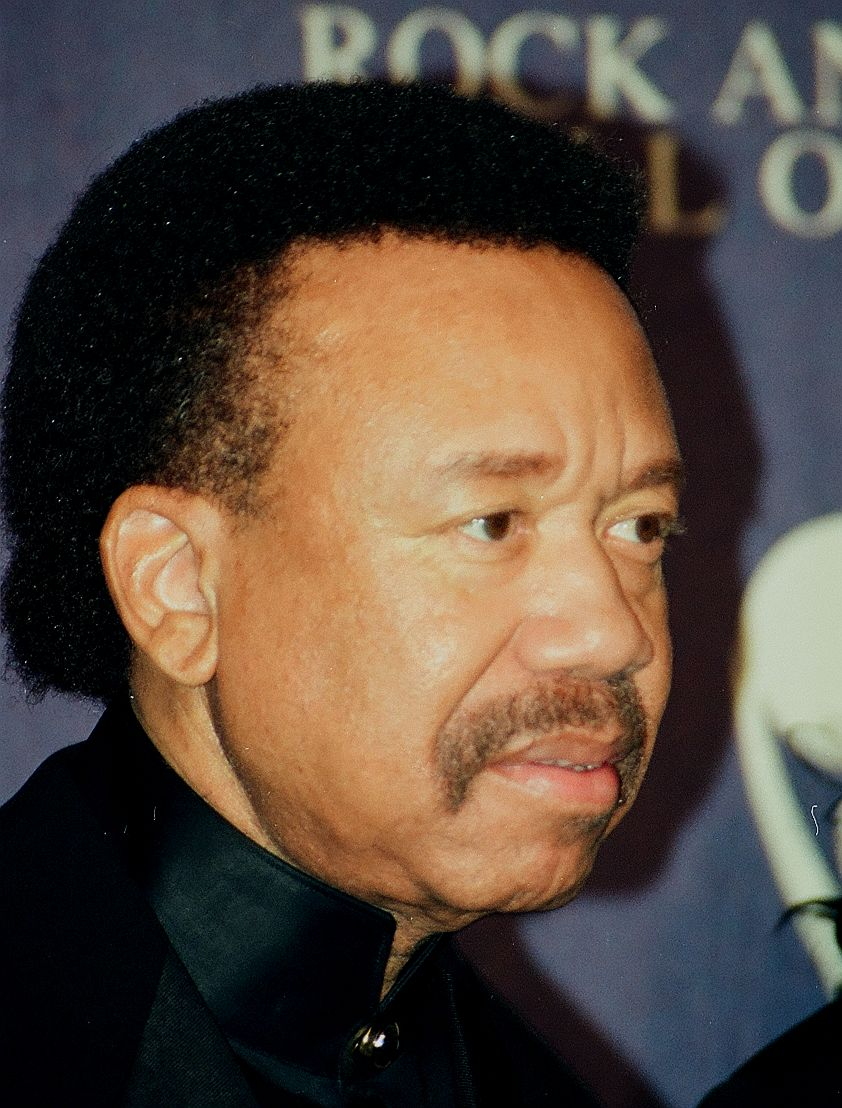
White at the 2000 Rock and Roll Hall of Fame ceremony

During 1985, White released a self titled solo album on Columbia. Robin Denselow of The Guardian called the album a "lush collection of self produced dance tracks, and the occasional ballad, with synths and drum programming immaculately in place, and the vocals as classy as ever". J.D. Considine of Musician also said the "Given his status as Earth, Wind & Fire's Shining Star, it comes as no surprise that White's first solo project sounds a lot like classic EW&F: tight, focused and punchy. But while White remembers to sink a hook into every verse and chorus, the emphasis here is on subtlety and sophistication as he works his way from R&B basics, from the studio mechanics of 'Switch on Your Radio' to the modified doo wop of 'Stand by Me', with a sense of craft that makes slickness irrelevant".

The album rose to number 12 on the Billboard Top Soul Albums chart. A cover of Ben E. King's "Stand by Me", feat. jazz saxophonist Gerald Albright got to No. 6 on the Billboard Hot Soul Singles and No. 11 on the Billboard Adult Contemporary Songs chart.

Another single from the album called "I Need You" rose to No. 20 on the Billboard Adult Contemporary Songs chart and No. 30 on the Billboard Hot Soul Singles chart.

In 2019, an album of previously unreleased recordings, titled Manifestation, was released. This album consists of selected tracks worked on by White and songwriter/producer Preston Glass over a period of nearly 30 years.

=== Screen and stage ===
White wrote and produced songs for the feature films Coming to America, A Low Down Dirty Shame, and Gatchaman OVA. He also composed music for the television series Life Is Wild. During 2006 he worked with Gregory Hines' brother, Maurice on the Broadway play Hot Feet. White and Allee Willis also wrote several new songs for the play.

In the movie BAADASSSSS!, the actor Khalil Kain portrayed a young Maurice White leading the early incarnation of Earth, Wind & Fire. Released at the 2004 Sundance Film Festival, the film was based on Melvin Van Peebles' struggles to film and distribute the movie Sweet Sweetback's Baadasssss Song. His son, Mario Van Peebles both directed the film and portrayed his father in the lead role. White also won an ASCAP Award as a composer of "That's The Way Of The World", with it being a theme song of the sitcom Hearts Afire.

== Personal life ==
White was a father of three children: one daughter, Hemeya and two sons, Kahbran and Eden. He owned two homes in California, one in Carmel Valley and the other a four-level condominium in Los Angeles. He was a fan of basketball and tennis. He went by the nickname of "Reese". His younger half-brother, Verdine White, an original member of Earth, Wind & Fire, still tours with the band as its bassist and a backing vocalist. Another half-brother, Fred White, was a member of EW&F from 1971 to 1984.

== Death ==
On the morning of February 4, 2016, White died in his sleep at his Los Angeles home from the effects of Parkinson's disease, at the age of 74. His brother Verdine said, "My brother, hero and best friend Maurice White passed away peacefully last night in his sleep. While the world has lost another great musician and legend, our family asks that our privacy is respected as we start what will be a very difficult and life-changing transition in our lives. Thank you for your prayers and well-wishes."

== Legacy ==
Along with EW&F, Maurice White was posthumously bestowed with a Grammy Lifetime Achievement Award at the annual Grammy Awards ceremony on February 15, 2016, at the Staples Center, Los Angeles, California. At the ceremony Stevie Wonder and Pentatonix performed a rendition of "That's the Way of the World" in tribute to White.

Artists such as Stokley Williams, Richard Marx, Raphael Saadiq, Larry Blackmon, and Nate Dogg have also named White as an influence.

== Awards and honors ==
=== Grammy Awards ===
The Grammy Awards are awarded annually by the National Academy of Recording Arts and Sciences of the United States. White received seven Grammys from 22 nominations.

Year	Nominee / work	Award	Result
1976	Earth, Wind & Fire	Best Instrumental Composition	Nominated
1976	Best of My Love	Best Rhythm & Blues Song	Nominated
1978	Got to Get You into My Life	Best Instrumental Arrangement Accompanying Vocalist(s)	Won
1978	Fantasy	Best R&B Song	Nominated
1979	Maurice White	Producer of the Year	Nominated

=== Other awards ===
- Four American Music Awards.
- The BET Lifetime Achievement Award
- An ASCAP Rhythm And Soul Award
- An ASCAP Pop Music Award
- Three NAACP Image Awards
- An ASCAP Rhythm and Soul Heritage Award
- Honoured by the Jazz Foundation of America.
- Inducted into the Rock and Roll Hall of Fame
- Inducted into the Memphis Music Hall of Fame
- A Star on the Hollywood Walk Of Fame
- On May 16, 2005, Maurice was honored by Los Angeles Valley College as the first recipient of their Cultural Achievement Award Of Excellence.
- On May 10, 2008, Maurice White and Philip Bailey received honorary doctorates from the Berklee College of Music.
- On May 20, 2008, Maurice, Phillip Bailey, Ralph Johnson and Verdine White received honorary doctorates from Columbia College of Chicago.

== Autobiography ==
On September 13, 2016, White's autobiography, Maurice White: My Life With Earth, Wind & Fire, by Maurice White and Herb Powell, was released. The book featured a foreword by Steve Harvey and an afterword by David Foster. Maurice White: My Life With Earth, Wind & Fire was also nominated for an NAACP Award in the category of Outstanding Literary Work, Biography/Auto-Biography.

== See also ==
- Albums produced by Maurice White
