= Another Voyage =

Studio album by Ramsey Lewis
- Released: August 1969
- Recorded: May 12–14, 1969
- Studios: Ter Mar Studios, Chicago
- Genre: Jazz-funk
- Labels: Cadet; LPS-827
- Producer: Ramsey Lewis

Ramsey Lewis chronology
Ramsey Lewis Live in Tokyo (1968)	Another Voyage (1969)	The Piano Player (1969)

Another Voyage is a studio album by the Ramsey Lewis Trio issued in 1969 on Cadet Records. The album peaked at No. 5 on the US Billboard Top Jazz Albums chart and No. 34 upon the US Billboard Top R&B Albums chart.

== Critical reception ==
Professional ratings
Review scores
Source	Rating
AllMusic	3/5 stars
The Guardian	3/5 stars
The Penguin Guide to Jazz Recordings	3.5/4 stars

Record Mirror found "Ramsey Lewis's mixture of jazz with pop and soul music never varies from his own well-developed style - and on this album there are another ten examples of his piano playing." Ed Hogan of AllMusic declared that "Another Voyage is one of the Ramsey Lewis Trio's best efforts" which "serves as a prime example of the muscular Chicago sound while preserving the pianist's trademark elegance". John Fordham of The Guardian also noted that Lewis' "licks-playing is undeniably engaging, his sense of dynamics and drama acute, and the drumming of Maurice White, before his departure to Earth, Wind & Fire, very tight and commanding."

== Track listing ==
All compositions by Ramsey Lewis except as indicated

=== Side 1 ===
1. "If You've Got It, Flaunt It, Pt. 1" (Lewis, Cleveland Eaton, Maurice White) - 2:49
2. "Wanderin' Rose" (Neal Creque) - 4:55
3. "How Beautiful Is Spring" (Eddie Harris) - 4:33
4. "Do What You Wanna" - 2:41
5. "My Cherie Amour" (Henry Cosby, Sylvia Moy, Stevie Wonder) - 3:49

=== Side 2 ===
1. "Bold and Black" (Harris) - 4:07
2. "Opus Number 5" (Charles Stepney) - 5:38
3. "Uhuru" (White) - 2:20
4. "Cecile" (Eaton) - 3:04
5. "If You've Got It, Flaunt It, Pt. 2" (Eaton, Lewis, White) - 2:18

== Personnel ==
- Stu Black - engineer
- Frank Chaplin - photography
- Ken Druker - executive producer
- Cleveland Eaton - bass
- Randy Harter - design
- Bob Irwin - mastering
- Hollis King - art direction
- Bryan Koniarz - producer
- Ramsey Lewis - piano, keyboards, electric piano, producer, original recording producer
- Jayme Pieruzzi - mastering
- Roger Poznan - cover photo
- Mark Cooper Smith - production assistant
- Sherniece Smith - art producer
- Charles Stepney - supervisor
- Phil Upchurch - electric guitar
- Maurice White - percussion, drums, kalimba

== Charts ==
Album
Year	Chart	Position
1969	US Billboard Top R&B Albums	34
1969	US Billboard Top Jazz Albums	5
1969	US Billboard 200	139
