= Salongo =

- designed by John Berg

Studio album by Ramsey Lewis
- Released: 1976
- Recorded: 1975–1976
- Studios: Wally Heider Recording, Burbank Studios, Los Angeles, California
- Genre: Jazz
- Label: Columbia
- Producers: Charles Stepney, Maurice White

Ramsey Lewis chronology
Don't It Feel Good (1975)	Salongo (1976)	Love Notes (1977)

Salongo is a studio album by jazz pianist Ramsey Lewis, released in 1976 by Columbia. The album rose to No. 7 on the US Billboard Top Jazz Albums chart and No. 17 on the US Billboard Top Soul Albums chart.

== Overview ==
Salongo was produced by Maurice White and Charles Stepney.

The album cover was designed by John Berg, who conceived the idea of painting Ramsey Lewis’ face.

== Critical reception ==
Professional ratings
Review scores
Source	Rating
AllMusic	3.5/5 stars
The Rolling Stone Jazz Record Guide	3/5 stars
Stereo Review	(favourable)
Variety	(favourable)

Variety wrote: "More excellent jazz and jazz-rock from Ramsey Lewis and other fine musicians. Hear Slick, Aufu Oodu, Rubato, Brazilica, Nicole and the title tune, much with Brazilian and/or African rhythms running wild."

Jason Elias of AllMusic wrote: "Those shocked or even dismayed by the lack of jazz on 1975's Don't It Feel Good would no doubt be pleasantly surprised by this. Released in 1976 and produced by Maurice White and Charles Stepney, Salongo offers a more substantial look at African and Latin styles." Elias added that "Salongo earns most of its raves by being one of the few albums of the time to sidestep commercial considerations. The effort is also one of Lewis's best at getting his eclectic nature and is more enjoyable than the better-selling Sun Goddess."

Chris Albertson of Stereo Review called the album "very good" and described Lewis' performance as "sly." Albertson also stated: "Sure, Ramsey Lewis has a commercial that is, salable-sound, but it's a good one, and he still plays dynamic, funky piano. The influences here range from Sly Stone to Weather Report. This is by no means music that will live forever, but neither is it stillborn, which is more than can be said for much of what we hear today."

== Track listing ==
Side one
No.	Title	Writer(s)	Length
1.	"Slick"	Charles Stepney, Maurice White	6:22
2.	"Aufu Oodu"	Derf Reklaw-Raheem	4:51
3.	"Rubato"	George Gershwin, Charles Stepney	0:42
4.	"Salongo"	Byron Gregory	4:42

Side two
No.	Title	Writer(s)	Length
5.	"Brazilica"	Maurice White, Martin Yarbrough	7:16
6.	"Nicole"	Jon Lind	3:49
7.	"Seventh Fold"	Charles Stepney	7:54

== Personnel ==
- Ramsey Lewis – piano
- Derf Reklaw Raheem – flute, percussion, vocals
- Jimmy Bryant – clavinet
- Byron Gregory – guitar
- Ron Harris – bass guitar
- Steve Cobb – drums, vocals
- Tang – vocals
- Ndugu Leon Chancler – drums (on "Slick" only)
- Ernie Watts – saxophone (on "Brazilica" only)

== Charts ==
Chart (1976)	Peak position
US Top LPs & Tape	77
US Top Soul LPs	17
US Top Jazz LPs	7

=== Singles ===
Year	Single	Chart positions
Year	Single	US R&B
1976	"Brazilica"	88
