= Sidney Barnes (musician) =

- Birth name: Sidney Alexander Barnes Jr.
- Born: February 6, 1941 (age 84); Welch, West Virginia, United States
- Origin: Welch, West Virginia, United States
- Genres: Rhythm and blues, blues, jazz
- Occupation(s): Singer-songwriter, musician
- Instrument: Vocals
- Years active: 1958–present
- Labels: Motown, Golden World Records
- Website: www.sidneybarnes.net

Sidney Alexander Barnes Jr. (born February 6, 1941) is an American singer, songwriter, and producer. He has been active in music since the early 1960s with Rotary Connection and as a staff writer with Motown during their time with the New York office and credits on albums with George Clinton, The Jackson 5, The Supremes, and B.B. King. Barnes has appeared on more than 150 albums and CD compilations.

== Early life ==
Barnes was born in Virginia, USA.

== Career ==
Barnes formed several doo-wop groups in high school, and sang with Marvin Gaye and Herb Heemster of Peaches & Herb. He released a solo recording, "Wait My Love". In 1963 he and his group The Serenades were signed with Berry Gordy. They made a few recordings, but the group was not financially successful. Sidney joined Motown Records staff as a songwriter. In 1964 Barnes composed and recorded with J.J. Jackson. Barnes and Jackson became a freelance songwriting team in 1964, following Barnes' term as a lead writer, producer and talent scout for the recently opened New York office of Motown Records and Jobete Music Barnes and Jackson wrote songs for several R & B solo artists of the period, including Sandra Phillips and Billy Prophet, formerly of The Jive Five. Barnes and Jackson also wrote for The Soul Sisters, and became staff writers at Sue Records, one of the few black-owned record labels based in New York at the time. Barnes and Jackson were soon thereafter signed to exclusive contracts with Red Bird Records and Trio Music Publishing, owed by Leiber and Stoller. Through the Blue Cat Records subsidiary of Red Bird Records, Barnes and Jackson worked on songs for The Shangri-Las. Barnes also recorded for the label.

By 1965, Barnes had emerged as a solo performer, recording songs written by Barnes and Jackson, including "I Hurt On The Other Side", and "I Don't Know Why".

In 1966, Barnes returned to Detroit and joined George Clinton at Golden World Records. During this partnership Barnes worked on "I Bet You" for The Jackson 5. When Golden World Records was sold to Motown, Barnes signed with Chess Records and was signed onto Rotary Connection.

Between 1971 and 1999 Barnes worked on TV, radio jingles, recordings and occasionally toured in the west and midwest United States. He took part in a project with Jerry Goldsmith on the soundtrack for Love at First Bite as well as Baby: Secret of the Lost Legend. Barnes has continued writing and performing on a smaller scale since 2000.

== Personal life ==
In 2000 Barnes married and moved to North Carolina. He currently resides in Asheville, where he performs locally when not travelling and performing with George Clinton.

== Writing credits ==
- "Come See Me" The Pretty Things
- "I'll Bet You" Funkadelic
- "I Can't Shake it Loose" The Supremes
- "I'll Bet You" The Jackson 5, Michael Jackson
- Long Live Our Love The Shangri-Las
- "Watch Yourself" B.B. King

== Releases ==
- I Have My Faith EP, 2005
- Foot Stompin' Music LP, 1978 on Parachute Records
- "Then & Now" cassette, 2004 on Widwest International Entertainment
- "Prelude 2" digital download, 2012 on Sids Kids recordings

== Contributions ==
- 1966 Get the Phone The Pretty Things Composer
- 1968 Lucille B.B. King Composer
- 1967 Rotary Connection Rotary Connection Vocals and composer
- 1968 Aladdin Rotary Connection Vocals and composer
- 1968 Peace Rotary Connection Vocals & Composer
- 1968 Love Child The Supremes Composer
- 1969 Songs Rotary Connection Vocals
- 1970 ABC The Jackson 5 Composer
- 1970 Dinner Music Rotary Connection Composer and Vocals
- 1976 MotherShip Connection Parliament Voices
- 1978 Love at First Bite Original Soundtrack Voices
- 1993 Go Fer You Funk George Clinton Vocals
- 1996 Best of the Shangri-Las The Shangri-Las Composer
- 1996 Testing Positive George Clinton Vocals, producer
- 2002 Journey Jerry Brunskill Vocals
- 2003 Black Midnight Sun Lucky Peterson Composer
