= Mitch Aliotta =

American musician (1944–2015)

Background information
- Born: May 30, 1944
- Origin: Chicago, Illinois
- Died: July 21, 2015 (aged 71)
- Genres: Psychedelic soul
- Occupation: Musician
- Instruments: Singing, bass
- Formerly of: Rotary Connection, Aliotta Haynes Jeremiah, The Proper Strangers

Mitchell A. Aliotta (May 30, 1944 – July 21, 2015), known professionally as Mitch Aliotta, was an American vocalist and bassist, known for being a member of the bands Rotary Connection and Aliotta Haynes Jeremiah.

== Musical career ==
Aliotta was involved in the psychedelic soul movement. He played bass guitar in Rotary Connection, and later formed the trio Aliotta Haynes Jeremiah. He was also a member of the band The Proper Strangers.

== Death ==
Aliotta died of complications from diabetes and chronic obstructive pulmonary disease in 2015, at the age of 71.

== Discography ==
With Rotary Connection

- Rotary Connection, 1967
- Aladdin, 1968
- Peace, 1968
- Dinner Music, 1970
- Hey Love, 1971 (as the New Rotary Connection)

With Aliotta–Haynes–Jeremiah

- Songs
- Slippin Away, 1977
- Lake Shore Drive, 1973
- Lake Shore drive at 25, 1997

=== With Minnie Ripperton ===
- Her Chess years, 1997

=== With Steve Goodman ===
- Gathering at the earl of Oldtown, 1970
