= American Gypsy =

American funk music group

American Gypsy is a funk music group formed in Los Angeles that achieved its greatest success in the Netherlands. In 1974, they had a top ten hit on the Single Top 100 Dutch pop music chart.

The group has performed under various names, including: Blue Morning, Orpheus and Pasadena Ghetto Orchestra.

== Members ==
Musicians who appeared in this band include:
1971 lineup

- Oliver Brown (percussion)
- Stephen Clisby (saxophone)
- Dale Harrell (guitar and vocals)
- Mike Hamane (guitar)
- Ricardo Louis James "Panama" (drums)
- Lorenzo Mills (lead vocals)
- Jose Skeet, Jr. (bass)

- Elout Smit (drums) 1977
- Omar Dupree (vocals) 1978
- Jetty Weels (vocals) 1978
- Lisa Schulte (vocals) 1979
- Steve Yellick (keyboards) 1981
- Dennis Whitbread (drums) 1981

== Discography ==
- American Gypsy discography at Discogs
