= The Movie Album (Ramsey Lewis album) =

Studio album by Ramsey Lewis
- Released: June 1967
- Recorded: July 1966
- Studio: Universal Recording Studio, Chicago
- Genre: Jazz
- Label: Cadet
- Producer: Esmond Edwards

Ramsey Lewis chronology
Goin' Latin (1967)	The Movie Album (1967)	Dancing in the Street (1967)

The Movie Album is a studio album by jazz pianist Ramsey Lewis released in June 1967 on Cadet Records. The album peaked at No. 5 on the US Billboard Best Selling Jazz LPs chart.

== Background ==
Produced by Esmond Edwards and recorded in 1966, the album features theme music from several feature films.

== Critical reception ==
Professional ratings
Review scores
Source	Rating
AllMusic	2/5 stars

AllMusic gave the album a 2 out of 5 stars.

== Track listing ==
1. "Theme from The Pawnbroker" (Quincy Jones) - 2:25
2. "Saturday Night After the Movies" (Richard Evans) - 2:55
3. "The Gentle Rain" (Luiz Bonfá) - 3:28
4. "China Gate" (Harold Adamson, Victor Young) - 2:43
5. "Emily" (Johnny Mandel, Johnny Mercer) - 2:57
6. "Goin' Hollywood" (Evans) - 3:30
7. "From Russia With Love" (Lionel Bart) - 2:39
8. "The Shadow of Your Smile" (Mandel, Paul Francis Webster) - 3:52
9. "Girl Talk" (Bobby Troup, Neil Hefti) - 3:25
10. "Matchmaker, Matchmaker" (Jerry Bock, Sheldon Harnick) - 3:01
11. "Return to Paradise" (Dimitri Tiomkin, Ned Washington) - 2:56

== Personnel ==
- Ramsey Lewis - piano
- Cleveland Eaton - bass
- Maurice White - drums
- Orchestra and voices arranged and conducted by Richard Evans

== Charts ==
Chart	Peak position
US Billboard Top LPs	124
US Billboard Best Selling Jazz LPs	5
