= Cleveland Eaton =

American jazz musician (1939–2020)

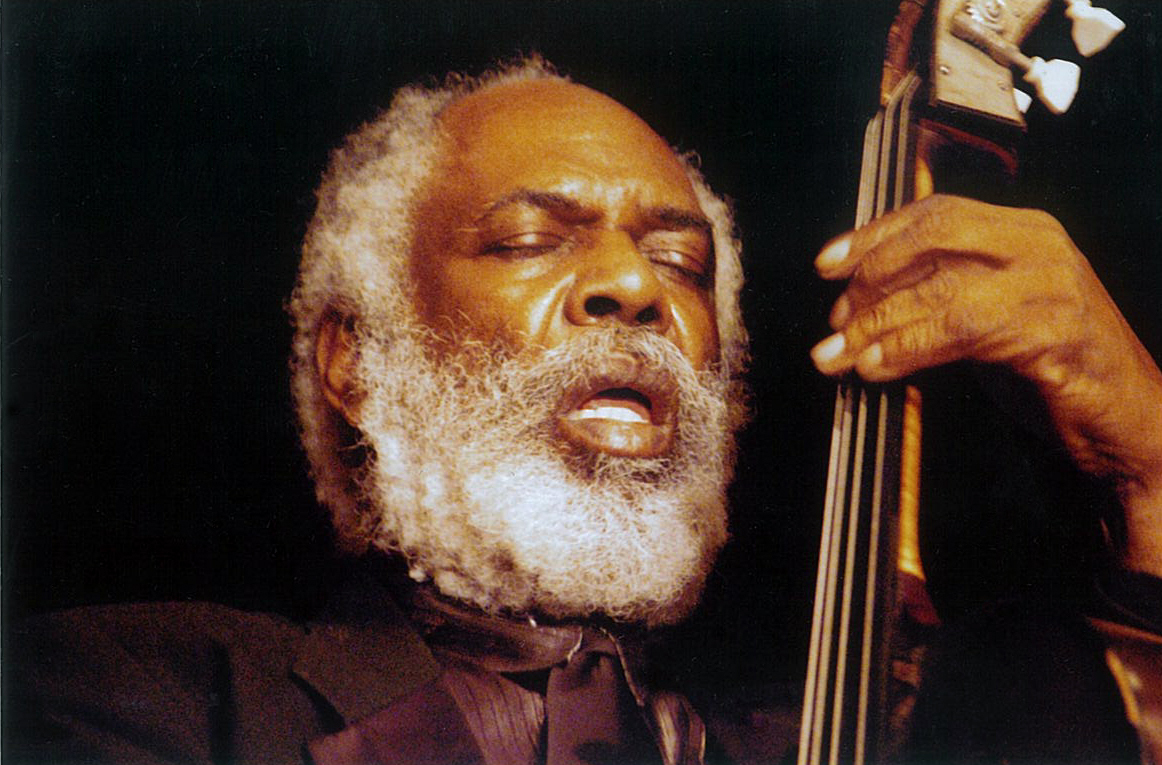

Background information
- Born: Cleveland Josephus Eaton II; August 31, 1939; Fairfield, Alabama, U.S.
- Died: July 5, 2020 (aged 80) Birmingham, Alabama, U.S.
- Genres: Jazz, swing, funk, R&B, pop
- Occupations: Musician, composer, arranger, bandleader, record producer
- Instrument: Double bass
- Years active: 1960–2020
- Formerly of: Count Basie Orchestra
- Website: www.clevelandeatonmusic.com

Cleveland Josephus Eaton II (August 31, 1939 – July 5, 2020) was an American jazz double bassist, producer, arranger, composer, publisher, and head of his own record company in Fairfield, Alabama, south of Huntsville. His most famous accomplishments were playing with the Ramsey Lewis Trio and the Count Basie Orchestra. His 1975 recording Plenty Good Eaton is considered a classic in the funk music genre. He was inducted into both the Alabama Jazz Hall of Fame and the Alabama Music Hall of Fame.

During the early 1960s Eaton taught music at Chicago Public Schools. He was the music teacher at George Washington Carver Upper Grade (7th - 8th grade).

== Early life and education ==
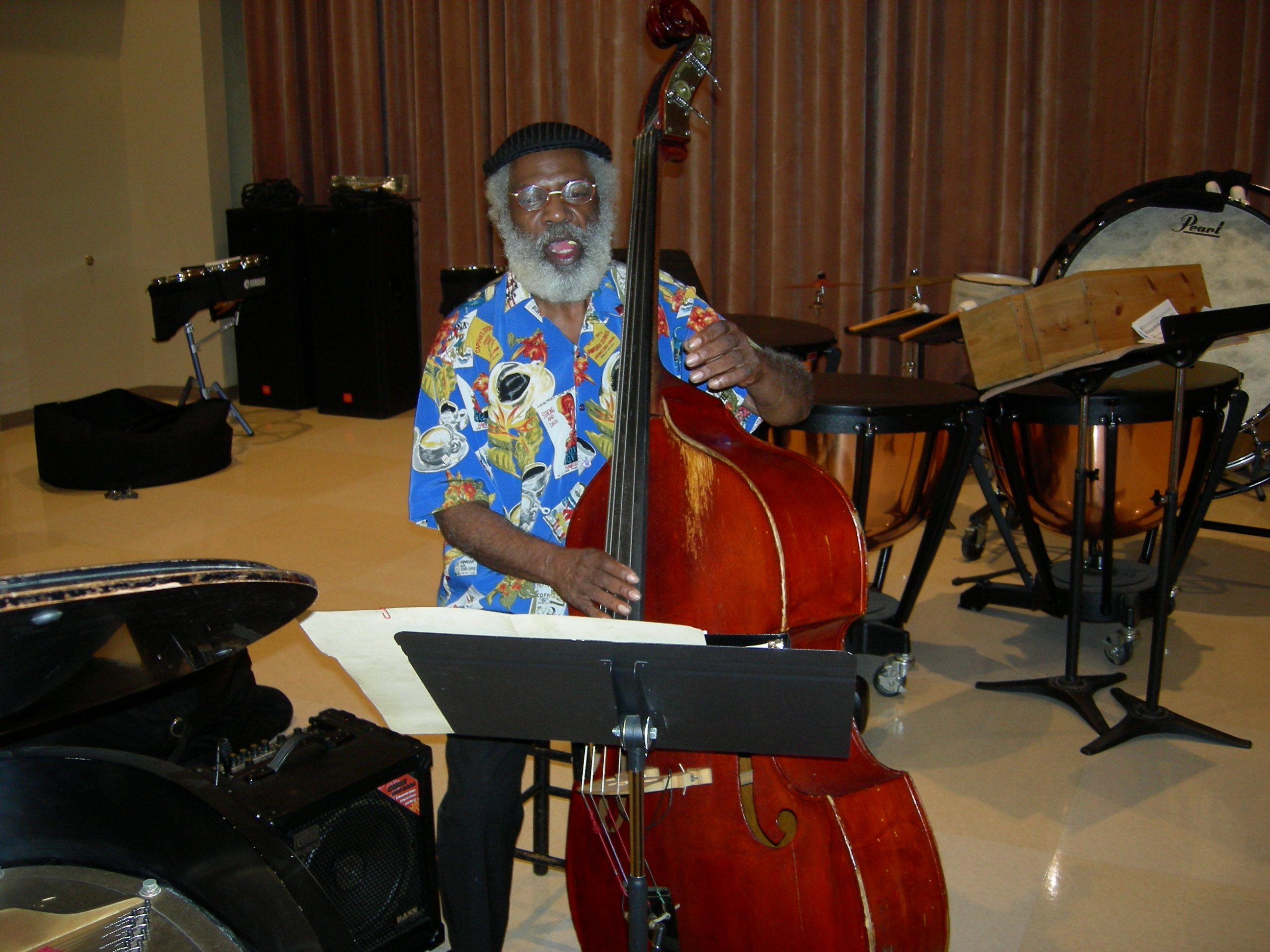
Eaton at a rehearsal before performing at the 2008 Taste of 4th Avenue Jazz Festival in Birmingham, Alabama

Eaton began studying music at the age of five, and by the time he was 15, he had mastered the piano, trumpet, and saxophone. He began playing bass when a teacher allowed him to take one home, spending nearly every waking hour learning the instrument. This led him to become what many called one of the best and most versatile jazz bassists in the business. Eaton came from a music-loving family, including an elder sister who studied at both Fisk University and the Juilliard School of Music in New York. He was a student of John T. "Fess" Whatley, one of the most influential and well-known educators in American jazz music during the 1920s and 1930s. who also mentored Sun Ra and Erskine Hawkins. Eaton played in a jazz group in college at Tennessee A & I State University, where he earned his bachelor's degree in music.

== Career ==
After graduation, Eaton left Alabama for Chicago, Illinois in 1960. He played an early gig with the Ike Cole Trio and recorded with the Donald Byrd & Pepper Adams Quintet (which also included Herbie Hancock). "I knew Herbie Hancock, who was with Donald Byrd and Pepper Adams," Eaton explained in an interview in Oxford American, "and he got me a job with them for a year and a half. I played the first 'Watermelon Man,' in fact; it was scribbled on a piece of paper at a club in East St. Louis, called Joseph's Coffee House." After working the Chicago jazz circuit, Eaton replaced bassist Eldee Young in the Ramsey Lewis Trio from 1964 to 1974. Eaton performed on 30 recordings with the trio, netting three Grammys and five Gold Records -- The In Crowd, Hang On Ramsey!, and Wade in the Water in 1966, Sound of Christmas in 1968 and Sun Goddess in 1974. Ramsey Lewis Trio also netted four gold-certified singles during this period.

Eaton made his debut as a leader on Half and Half on Gamble Records in 1973. Two years later he recorded the jazz-funk classic Plenty Good Eaton, often sampled by contemporary artists. After signing to Ovation, he issued Instant Hip, a pioneering exercise in free funk fusion and Afro-futurist disco. In 1974, he began performing and touring with his group Cleve Eaton and Co. In September, 1978 Eaton released a disco-themed track on Gull Records GULS63 called "Bama Boogie Woogie" which reached number 35 in the BBC Top 75 chart in the UK and proved very popular on the UK club scene at the time.

As Eaton relays it in a 1997 interview, he was teaching, playing clubs, and writing his own music in 1979 when Count Basie called, asking if he could fill in for a bass player who was ill. He was told that his services with the Count Basie Orchestra would be needed for about two weeks. "After the two weeks," Eaton recalls, "he took me aside and said he was cutting the other guy loose, and did I want the job?" And so Eaton's two-week road trip ultimately stretched to 17 years. The jazz piano legend would refer to Eaton as "The Count's Bassist." He performed on Basie's final albums and continued playing with the orchestra into the '90s, which netted him ten albums.

After spending years on the road as a musician and arranger with a list of artists who form a virtual Who's Who of jazz, Eaton returned to Birmingham, Alabama, to join UAB's music department in 1996. In 2004 he formed the group Cleve Eaton and the Alabama All Stars.

Eaton lent his talents to over 100 albums, and composed about three times as many songs. He played on notable recording sessions with Dexter Gordon, Gene Ammons, John Klemmer, Ike Cole, Bunky Green, The Dells, Bobby Rush, Minnie Riperton, Jerry Butler and Rotary Connection, George Benson, Henry Mancini, Frank Sinatra, Joe Williams, Billy Eckstine, Sarah Vaughan, Ella Fitzgerald. He also performed with Nancy Wilson, Peggy Lee, Mimi Hines, Sammy Davis Jr., Julie London, Bobby Troup, Brook Benton, Lou Rawls, Nipsey Russell, Morgana King, Gloria Lynne, Herbie Hancock, Magic City Jazz Orchestra, The Platters, Temptations, and The Miracles.

== Personal life ==
Eaton died on July 5, 2020, in Birmingham, Alabama. He was 80, and had been hospitalized during the last four months of his life. He was survived by his wife, Myra Eaton, two sons, Lothair Eaton and Andre Eaton; and a daughter, Keena Eaton Kelley. Eaton was predeceased by a son, Cleveland Eaton III, and a daughter, Margralita Eaton. Eaton was also survived by stepchildren from his marriage to Myra Eaton: stepdaughters Tania Adams and Kwani Dickerson Carson, and stepson Kole Anderson. He was blessed with grandsons Ben Adams, Kameron Dickerson, Kasey Dickerson and Karden Dickerson.

== Discography ==
=== As leader ===
- Half and Half (Gamble, 1973)
- Plenty Good Eaton (Black Jazz, 1975)
- Instant Hip (Ovation, 1976)
- Bama Boogie Woogie (single) (Gull Records, 1978)
- Keep Love Alive (Ovation, 1979)
- Strolling with the Count (Ovation, 1980)

=== With Ramsey Lewis ===
- More Sounds of Christmas (Argo, 1964)
- You Better Believe Me (Argo, 1965)
- Wade in the Water (Cadet, 1966)
- The Movie Album (Cadet, 1966)
- Goin' Latin (Cadet, 1967)
- Dancing in the Street (Cadet, 1967)
- Up Pops Ramsey Lewis (Cadet, 1967)
- Maiden Voyage (Cadet, 1968)
- Another Voyage (Cadet, 1969)
- The Piano Player (Cadet, 1970)
- Them Changes (Cadet, 1970)
- Back to the Roots (Cadet, 1971)
- Upendo Ni Pamoja (Columbia, 1972)
- Funky Serenity (Columbia, 1973)
- Ramsey Lewis' Newly Recorded All-Time Non-Stop Golden Hits (Columbia, 1973)
- Sun Goddess (Columbia, 1974)
- Solar Wind (Columbia, 1974)

=== With the Soulful Strings ===
- Groovin' with the Soulful Strings (1967)
- The Magic of Christmas (1968)

=== With Gene Ammons & Dexter Gordon ===
- The Chase! (Prestige, 1970)
- Chicago Concert (Prestige, 1971)

=== With the Count Basie Orchestra ===
- Kansas City Shout (Pablo, 1980)
- Warm Breeze (1981)
- 88 Basie Street (Fantasy, 1983)
- Me and You (Pablo, 1983)
- Fancy Pants (1983)
- The Legend, the Legacy (1989)
- George Benson/Count Basie Orchestra Big Boss Band (1990)
- Best of the Count Basie Big Band (1991)
- Live at El Morocco (1992)

=== With Bunky Green ===
- Playin' for Keeps (Cadet, 1966)
