= Cadet Records =

American record label

- Parent company: Chess Records
- Founded: 1955
- Defunct: 1974
- Status: Inactive
- Genre: Jazz, blues, rock
- Country of origin: U.S.

Cadet Records was an American record label that began as Argo Records in 1955 as the jazz subsidiary of Chess Records. Argo changed its name in 1965 to Cadet to avoid confusion with the similarly named label in the UK. Cadet stopped releasing records around 1974, when its artists were moved to Chess.

Over its nearly 20-year lifespan, Cadet released more than 500 albums, establishing itself as a major force in soul-jazz and jazz-funk. The label's commercial peak came during 1965-1969, when pianist Ramsey Lewis became its most successful artist with hits like "Wade in the Water" (1966), while key producers and arrangers such as Esmond Edwards, Richard Evans, and Charles Stepney shaped its distinctive sound

There was also Cadet Concept Records, for rock and more adventurous music, such as the Rotary Connection, and the experimental psychedelic Electric Mud album by Muddy Waters. The label had a Top 20 hit in 1968 with the single "Pictures of Matchstick Men" by the British band Status Quo through a licensing arrangement with Pye Records in London. A St. Louis band known as The Truth a.k.a. The Acid Sette were signed and recorded for this label under the guidance of Abner Spector.

Notable Cadet releases included Dorothy Ashby's influential harp-jazz album Afro-Harping (1968), Etta James' Tell Mama (1967), and Terry Callier's soul-folk recordings Occasional Rain and What Color Is Love (1972). The label's parent company Chess Records was sold to GRT Corporation in 1969, which led to Cadet's gradual decline and eventual closure

The masters are now owned by Universal Music.

== Discography (1965–1975) ==
=== Continuation of the Argo 600 Jazz Series ===
Cadet was established in 1965 following a name change of the Argo label. When the name was changed, a new logo of a chessman's horse was introduced to replace the previous chess piece logo. Cadet continued the Argo 600 Jazz series and the 4000 Blues series.

Catalog number	Title	Artist
LPS-628	But Not For Me	Ahmad Jamal Trio
LPS-637	Jug Turn From Overbrook	James Moody
LPS-646	Jamal At The Penthouse	Ahmad Jamal
LPS-679	Moody With Strings	James Moody
LPS-687	Sound Of Christmas	Ramsey Lewis Trio
LPS-693	Sound Of Spring	Ramsey Lewis Trio
LPS-722	The Message	Illinois Jacquet
LPS-723	Barefoot Sunday Blues	Ramsey Lewis Trio
LPS-741	At The Bohemian Caverns	Ramsey Lewis Trio
LPS-745	More Sounds Of Christmas	Ramsey Lewis Trio
LPS-754	Spectrum	Illinois Jacquet
LPS-755	Choice! The Best of the Ramsey Lewis Trio	Ramsey Lewis Trio
LPS-756	Cookin' the Blues	James Moody
LPS-757	The In Crowd	Ramsey Lewis Trio
LPS-758	Extensions	Ahmad Jamal
LPS-759	Musty Rusty	Lou Donaldson
LPS-760	Inter-Action	Sonny Stitt and Zoot Sims
LPS-761	Hang On Ramsey!	Ramsey Lewis Trio
LPS-762	The Knack	The Interpreters
LPS-763	Smoking with Willis	Willis Jackson
LPS-764	Rhapsody	Ahmad Jamal with Strings
LPS-765	The Wailer	Sonny Cox
LPS-766	Playin' for Keeps	Bunky Green
LPS-767	Gotta Travel On	Ray Bryant Trio
LPS-768	Rough House Blues	Lou Donaldson
LPS-769	Man at Work - Reissue of Argo LP-655	Kenny Burrell
LPS-770	Soul in the Night	Sonny Stitt and Bunky Green
LPS-771	Swingin' - Reissue of Argo LP-611.	Ramsey Lewis Trio
LPS-772	The Tender Gender	Kenny Burrell
LPS-773	Go Power!	Illinois Jacquet
LPS-774	Wade in the Water	Ramsey Lewis
LPS-775	Raising the Roof	Odell Brown and the Organ-izers
LPS-776	Paint It Black	The Soulful Strings
LPS-777	Heat Wave	Ahmad Jamal
LPS-778	Lonesome Traveler	Ray Bryant
LPS-779	Have Yourself a Soulful Little Christmas	Kenny Burrell
LPS-780	The Latinization of Bunky Green	Bunky Green
LPS-781	Slow Freight	Ray Bryant
LPS-782	The Movie Album	Ramsey Lewis
LPS-783	Gene Ammons Makes it Happen - Reissue Of Chess LP 1442	Gene Ammons
LPS-784	Mood to Be Wooed	Various Artists
LPS-785	Jug and Sonny - Edited Reissue Of Chess LP 1445	Gene Ammons and Sonny Stitt
LPS-786	Standard Eyes	Ahmad Jamal
LPS-787	Goin' Down Home	Don Patterson
LPS-788	Mellow Yellow	Odell Brown and the Organ-izers
LPS-789	Blowing in the Wind	Lou Donaldson
LPS-790	Goin' Latin	Ramsey Lewis
LPS-791	Feature Spot	Eldee Young and Red Holt
LPS-792	Cry Young	Ahmad Jamal with Voices
LPS-793	The Ray Bryant Touch	Ray Bryant
LPS-794	Dancing in the Street	Ramsey Lewis
LPS-795	Ain't Doing Too B-A-D, Bad	Bobby Bryant
LPS-796	Groovin' with the Soulful Strings	The Soulful Strings
LPS-797	Involvement	John Klemmer Quartet
LPS-798	Ode to 52nd Street	Kenny Burrell
LPS-799	Up Pops Ramsey Lewis	Ramsey Lewis
LPS-800	Ducky	Odell Brown and the Organ-izers
LPS-801	Take a Bryant Step	Ray Bryant
LPS-802	Tell Mama	Etta James
LPS-803	Out of Different Bags	Marlena Shaw
LPS-804	There Is	The Dells
LPS-805	Another Exposure	The Soulful Strings
LPS-806	Brand New Morning	Frank D'Rone
LPS-807	The Bright, the Blue and the Beautiful	Ahmad Jamal with Voices
LPS-808	And We Were Lovers	John Klemmer Quartet with Strings
LPS-809	Afro-Harping	Dorothy Ashby
LPS-810	Her Point of View	Clea Bradford
LPS-811	Maiden Voyage	Ramsey Lewis
LPS-812	The Natural Thing	Brother Jack McDuff
LPS-813	The Peace-Maker	Harold Land Quintet
LPS-814	The Magic of Christmas	The Soulful Strings
LPS-815	Lou Donaldson at His Best	Lou Donaldson
LPS-816	Yusef Lateef - Reissue of Argo LP 634	Yusef Lateef
LPS-817	Getting Our Thing Together	Brother Jack McDuff
LPS-818	Up Above the Rock	Ray Bryant
LPS-819	Light My Fire	Woody Herman
LPS-820	Back By Demand: The Soulful Strings in Concert	The Soulful Strings
LPS-821	Mother Nature's Son	Ramsey Lewis
LPS-822	The Dells Musical Menu: Always Together	The Dells
LPS-823	Odell Brown Plays Otis Redding	Odell Brown
LPS-824	The Dells' Greatest Hits	The Dells
LPS-825	Dorothy's Harp	Dorothy Ashby
LPS-826	Upchurch	Phil Upchurch
LPS-827	Another Voyage	Ramsey Lewis Trio
LPS-828	The Third Cup	The Eddie Fisher Quintet
LPS-829	Love Is Blue	The Dells
LPS-830	Sound Ray	Ray Bryant
LPS-831	Gin and Orange	Brother Jack McDuff
LPS-832	Etta James Sings Funk	Etta James
LPS-833	The Spice Of Life	Marlena Shaw
LPS-834	String Fever	The Soulful Strings
LPS-835	Heavy Exposure	Woody Herman
LPS-836	The Piano Player	Ramsey Lewis
LPS-837	Like It Is, Like It Was	The Dells
LPS-838	Free Delivery	Odell Brown
LPS-839	The Best of Ramsey Lewis	Ramsey Lewis
LPS-840	The Way I Feel	Phil Upchurch
LPS-841	The Rubaiyat of Dorothy Ashby	Dorothy Ashby
LPS-842	Fried Buzzard	Lou Donaldson
LPS-843	S.O.B.	Shades of Brown
LPS-844	Them Changes	Ramsey Lewis
LPS-845	Woody	Woody Herman
LPS-846	Soulful Strings Play Gamble and Huff	The Soulful Strings
LPS-847	Losers Weepers	Etta James
LPS-848	Eddie Fisher & the Next Hundred Years	Eddie Fisher

=== Continuation of the Argo 4000 Blues Series ===
Catalog number	Title	Artist
LPS-4025	Top Ten	Etta James
LPS-4036	The Three Souls	Dangerous Dan Express
LPS-4046	Bob Hope on the Road to Vietnam	Bob Hope
LPS-4047	Jammin' with the Windjammers	The Windjammers
LPS-4048	Feeling Good	Jean DuShon
LPS-4049	Tough!	Art Blakey and The Jazz Messengers
LPS-4050	Fred Wacker Big Band Swings Cool	Fred Wacker Big Band
LPS-4051	The Blues, Volume 5	Various Artists
LPS-4052	I'm So Good That I Don't Have to Brag!	Shel Silverstein
LPS-4053	Weary Traveler	King Fleming
LPS-4054	Drain My Brain	Shel Silverstein
LPS-4055	Call My Name	Etta James
LPS-4056	I Cried for You	Johnny Watson
LPS-4057	Carryin' On	Milt Trenier and Micki Lynn
LPS-4058	Fighting Back	Greig McRitchie Band

=== Cadet Concept ===
Cadet Concept was established by Marshall Chess in 1967 with the first album by Rotary Connection and issued five albums by the group out of the 18 albums released on the label up until 1970 as well as featuring British band Status Quo, saxophonist John Klemmer and blues legends Muddy Waters and Howlin' Wolf.

Catalog No.	Album	Artist
LPS-312	Rotary Connection	Rotary Connection
LPS-314	Electric Mud	Muddy Waters
LPS-315	Messages from the Status Quo	Status Quo
LPS-316	Salloom, Sinclair and the Mother Bear	Salloom & Sinclair
LPS-317	Aladdin	Rotary Connection
LPS-318	Peace	Rotary Connection
LPS-319	The Howlin' Wolf Album	Howlin' Wolf
LPS-320	After the Rain	Muddy Waters
LPS-321	Blowin' Gold	John Klemmer
LPS-322	Songs	Rotary Connection
LPS-323	In Due Time...	Aesop's Fables
LPS-325	What I Did on My Vacation	Joel Vance
LPS-326	All the Children Cried	John Klemmer
LPS-327	Salloom and Sinclair	Salloom & Sinclair
LPS-328	Dinner Music	Rotary Connection
LPS-329	Archie Whitewater	Archie Whitewater
LPS-330	Eruptions	John Klemmer
LPS-331	Aesop's Fables	Aesop's Fables

=== GRT consolidated Chess/Cadet album discography (1971–1975) ===
Following the death of Leonard Chess in 1971, Chess Records was purchased by General Recorded Tape, GRT Records, which consolidated both the Chess and Cadet labels into a single labeling number sequence and used the artists and labels until 1975.

Catalog number	Title	Artist
Chess CH-50001	Another Dimension	Bo Diddley
Chess CH-50002	Message to the Young	Howlin' Wolf
Cadet CA-50004	Freedom Means	The Dells
Cadet CH-50005	Great Female Soul Vocalists	Various Artists
Cadet Concept CC-50006	Hey Love	The New Rotary Connection
Cadet CA-50007	Occasional Rain	Terry Callier
Chess CH-50008	San Francisco Dues	Chuck Berry
Cadet CA-50009	Mystical Lady	Shirley Scott
Cadet Concept CC-50010	Oh What a Lovely War	Colonel Bagshot
Cadet CA-50011	Swahili Strut	Bobby Bryant Sextet
Chess CH-50012	Live at Mr. Kelly's	Muddy Waters
Chess CH-50013	Greatest Hits	Little Milton
Chess CH-50014	Power and Light	Power & Light
Chess CH-50015	Live and Cookin'	Howlin' Wolf
Chess CH-50016	Where it All Began	Bo Diddley
Cadet CA-50017	The Dells Sing Dionne Warwick's Greatest Hits	The Dells
Chess CH-50018	Basic Soul	Koko Taylor
Cadet CA-50019	What Color Is Love	Terry Callier
Cadet CA-50020	The Groover	Ramsey Lewis
Cadet CA-50021	Sweet as Funk Can Be	The Dells
Cadet 2CA-50022	The Best of the Soulful Strings	The Soulful Strings
Chess CH-50023	Can't Get No Grindin'	Muddy Waters
Cadet CA-50024	Check This Out	Jack McDuff
Cadet CA-50025	Lean on Me	Shirley Scott
Cadet CA-50026	Mr. Bojangles	Sonny Stitt
Chess 2CH-50027	This Is My Story	Sonny Boy Williamson
Chess CH-50029	The London Bo Diddley Sessions	Bo Diddley
Chess 2CH-50030	The Golden Age of Rhythm and Blues	Various Artists
Chess CH-50031	Love More Than Pride	Laura Lee
Chess CH-50032	Ghettos of the Mind	Bama the Village Poet
Chess 2CH-50033	Fathers and Sons	Muddy Waters
Cadet CA-50034	Teardrops in the Rain	Johnny Nash
Cadet 2CA-50035	Inspiration	Ahmad Jamal
Cadet CA-50036	Superstition	Shirley Scott
Cadet CA-50037	Give Your Baby a Standing Ovation	The Dells
Cadet 2CA-50038	It Was a Very Good Year	Ray Bryant
Cadet 2CA-50039	I Cover the Waterfront	Sonny Stitt
Chess CH-50040	Come and Get Me	Kim Tolliver
Cadet CA-50041	I Just Can't Help Myself	Terry Callier
Chess CH-50042	Etta James a.k.a. Only a Fool	Etta James
Chess CH-50043	Bio	Chuck Berry
Cadet CA-50044	Songs for Ageing Children	Dave Van Ronk
Chess CH-50045	The Back Door Wolf	Howlin' Wolf
Cadet CA-50046	The Dells	The Dells
Chess CH-50047	Big Bad Bo	Bo Diddley
Cadet CA-50048	While My Guitar Gently Weeps	Jimmy Ponder
Cadet CA-50049	Atlantis	Daniel Salinas
Cadet CA-50051	The Fourth Dimension	Jack McDuff
Cadet CA-50052	In the Cut	Ray Bryant
Chess CH-50053	You Can All Join In	The Violinaires
Cadet 2CA-50058	Solid Ivory	Ramsey Lewis
Cadet CH-50059	Cross My Heart	Billy Stewart
Cadet CA-50060	Satan	Sonny Stitt
Chess 2CH-60000	Laugh Time	Moms Mabley and Pigmeat Markham
Cadet CA-60001	Back to the Roots	Ramsey Lewis
Cadet 2CA-60002	Charlie Parker Memorial Concert	Various Artists
Cadet 2CA-60003	Rock Bottom	Various Artists
Chess 2CH-60004	Peaches	Etta James
Chess 2CH-60005	Got My Own Bag of Tricks	Bo Diddley
Chess 2CH-60006	McKinley Morganfield A.K.A. Muddy Waters	Muddy Waters
Cadet 2CA-60007	Ha' Mercy	Lou Donaldson
Chess CH-60008	The London Howlin' Wolf Sessions	Howlin' Wolf
Chess 2CH-60009	Moms and Pigmeat	Moms Mabley and Pigmeat Markham
Cadet 2CA-60010	Everything 'Bout Sax and Flute	James Moody
Chess 2CH-60011	Mad Man's Blues	John Lee Hooker
Chess 2CH-60012	Chicago Blues Anthology	Various Artists
Chess CH-60013	The London Muddy Waters Sessions	Muddy Waters
Chess 2CH-60014	Boss Blues Harmonica	Little Walter
Chess 2CH-60015	Blues Avalanche (Recorded Live at the Montreux Jazz Festival)	Various Artists
Chess 2CH-60016	Chester Burnett A.K.A. Howlin' Wolf	Howlin' Wolf
Cadet 2CA-60017	The Heatin' System	Jack McDuff
Cadet 2CA-60018	Inside	Ramsey Lewis
Cadet 2CA-60019	Cool Cookin'	Kenny Burrell
Chess CH-60020	The London Chuck Berry Sessions	Chuck Berry
Cadet CA-60021	12 X 6 The Hard Way	Various Artists
Cadet CA-60022	12 X 6 The Easy Way	Various Artists
Chess 2CH-60023	Chuck Berry's Golden Decade, Volume 2	Chuck Berry
Cadet CA-60024	12 X 6 Volume 3	Various Artists
Cadet CA-60025	12 X 6 Volume 4	Various Artists
Chess 2CH-60026	London Revisited	Howlin' Wolf / Muddy Waters
Cadet CA-60027	The Dells vs. The Dramatics	The Dells / The Dramatics
Chess 2CH-60028	Chuck Berry's Golden Decade, Volume 3	Chuck Berry
Chess CH-60029	Come a Little Closer	Etta James
Cadet CA-60030	The Mighty, Mighty Dells	The Dells
Chess CH-60031	"Unk" in Funk	Muddy Waters
Chess CH-60032	Chuck Berry	Chuck Berry
Cadet CA-60033	Got to Get Your Own	Reuben Wilson
Chess CH-60034	American Gypsy	American Gypsy
Chess CH-60035	The Muddy Waters Woodstock Album	Muddy Waters
Chess CH-60036	The Dells Greatest Hits, Volume 2	The Dells
Chess CH-60037	Black Caucus Concert	Various Artists
Cadet 2CA-60038	Early Visions	Gene Ammons
Cadet CA-60039	Magnetic Feel	Jack McDuff
Cadet CA-60040	Never Can Say Goodbye	[[Sonny Stitt {{{last}}}]]
Chess CH-60042	Music to Make Love By	Solomon Burke
Cadet CA-60044	We Got to Get Our Thing Together	The Dells

== See also ==
- List of record labels
