= Rotary Connection =

American psychedelic soul band (1966–74)

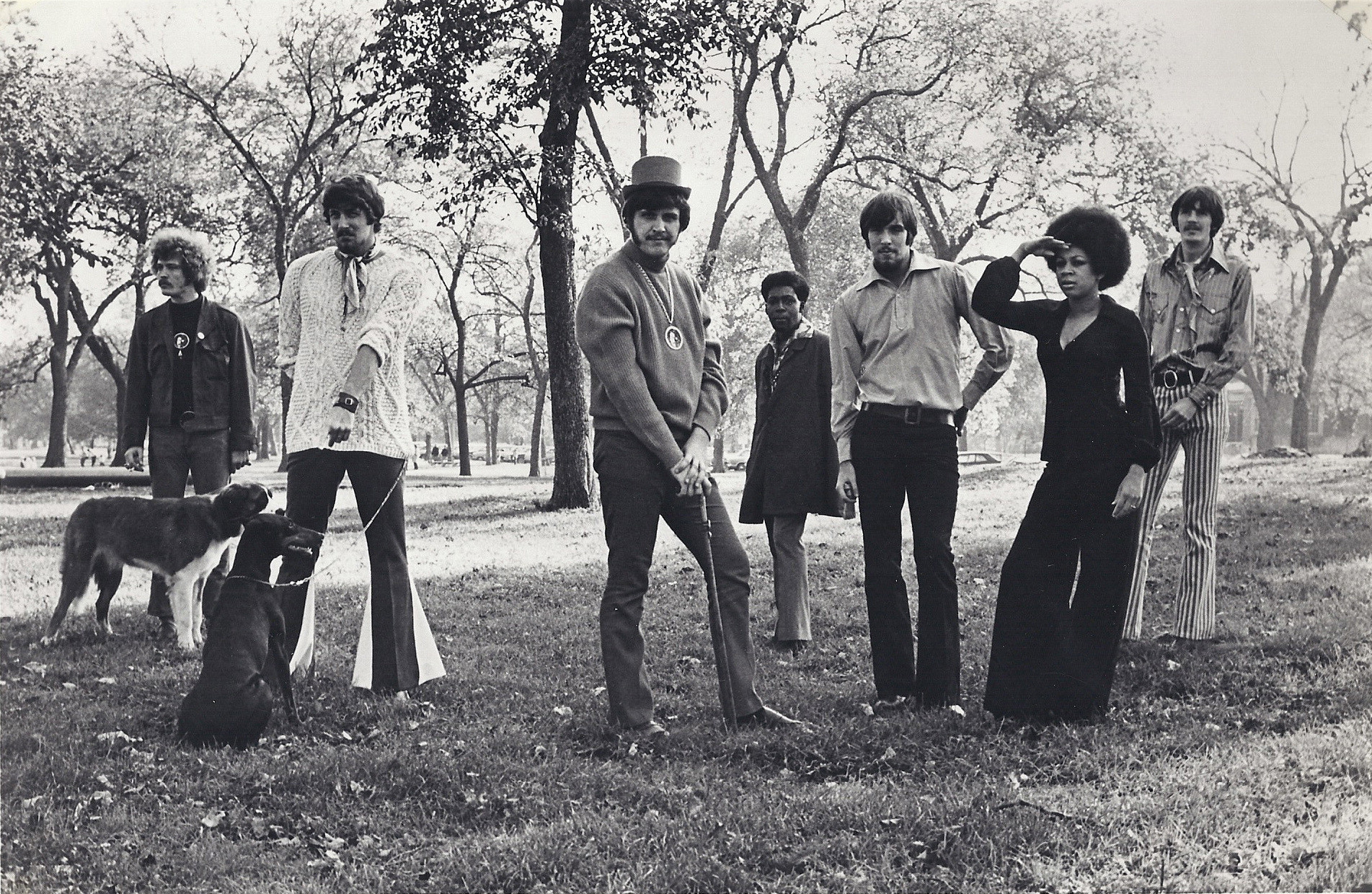
- Rotary Connection c. 1968

Background information
- Origin: Chicago, Illinois, United States
- Genres: Psychedelic soul; psychedelic rock; psychedelic pop
- Years active: 1965–1973
- Labels: Chess; Cadet
- Past members: Minnie Riperton; Phil Upchurch; Mitch Aliotta; Sidney Barnes; Bobby Simms; Charles Stepney; Tommy Vincent; Kenny Venegas; Tom Donlinger; Jim Donlinger; Jim Nyeholt; Judy Hauff; Shirley Wahls; Jon Stocklin

Rotary Connection was an American psychedelic soul band, formed in Chicago in 1966.

After the band's 1967 debut album Rotary Connection, session musicians who played with the band also backed Muddy Waters on his 1968 psychedelic blues album Electric Mud. The band's members included Minnie Riperton, who would later emerge as a solo artist.

== Career ==
=== Foundation and debut album ===
The highly experimental band was the idea of Marshall Chess, son of Chess Records founder Leonard Chess. Marshall was the director behind a start-up label, Cadet Concept Records, and wanted to focus on music outside of the blues and rock genres, which had made the Chess label popular. This led Marshall to turn his attention to the burgeoning psychedelic movement.

He recruited Charles Stepney, a vibraphonist and classically trained arranger and producer. Marshall then recruited members of a little-known white rock band, the Proper Strangers: Bobby Simms, Mitch Aliotta, and Ken Venegas. Sidney Barnes, a songwriter within the Chess organization, also joined, as did Judy Hauff and a Chess receptionist named Minnie Riperton, who would later be successful in her own solo career.

Marshall also called up prominent session musicians associated with the Chess label, including guitarist Phil Upchurch and drummer Morris Jennings. Chess described these musicians as "the hottest, most avant garde rock guys in Chicago".

Rotary Connection released their self-titled debut album in late 1967. It had various styles, borrowing heavily from pop, rock, and soul, but was not radio friendly. The album also boasted an Eastern influence through its use of the sitar on the tracks "Turn Me On" and "Memory Band". Stepney's arrangements, brought to life by the Chicago Symphony Orchestra, imbued the album with a certain dreamlike quality; this would become a trademark of both the arranger and the mouthpiece.

=== Electric Mud and The Howlin' Wolf Album ===
As a result of the success of The Rotary Connection, Chess felt that he could revive the career of bluesmen Muddy Waters and Howlin' Wolf, by recording two albums of experimental, psychedelic blues. He used session musicians who had worked with Rotary Connection, producing the albums Electric Mud (1968) and The Howlin' Wolf Album (1969). Chess hoped the new albums would sell well among fans of psychedelic rock bands influenced by Muddy Waters and Howlin' Wolf. In place of Muddy Waters and Howlin' Wolf's regular musicians were Gene Barge, Pete Cosey, Roland Faulkner, Morris Jennings, Louis Satterfield, Charles Stepney and Phil Upchurch. Cosey, Upchurch and Jennings joked about calling the group "The Electric Niggers". Marshall Chess liked the suggestion, but Leonard Chess refused to allow the name. Ultimately, Wolf and blues purists criticized the psychedelic sound of Electric Mud and The Howlin' Wolf Album, but it influenced the up and coming hip hop scene years later.

=== Further albums, Texas International Pop Festival and disbandment ===
In 1968, Rotary Connection released their second and third albums, Aladdin and Peace. Aladdin found Riperton assuming a more prominent vocal role than the "background instrument" status she had on the debut. The latter was a Christmas release, with strong messages of love and understanding for a nation in the grips of Vietnam. The album's cover art featured a hippie Santa Claus. Peace was notable for being involved in controversy: an anti-war cartoon, in a December 1968 edition of Billboard magazine, featured a graphic image of a bruised and bloodied Santa on a Vietnam battlefield. Mistaking this cartoon for the album's cover art, a drunken executive at Montgomery Ward cancelled all shipments of the album.

On August 30, 1969, the band played at the Texas International Pop Festival followed by the Palm Beach Pop Festival on November 29. Rotary Connection released three more albums: Songs, in 1969, a collection of drastic reworkings of other artists' songs, including Otis Redding's "Respect" and The Band's "The Weight"; Dinner Music in 1970, in which they added elements of folk and country into the mix along with some electronic experimentation; and Hey, Love in 1971, a more jazz-oriented LP on which the band was billed as the New Rotary Connection. From this album came "I Am the Black Gold of the Sun".

The outfit disbanded in 1974.

== Discography ==
Main albums

- 1967: Rotary Connection (U.S. No. 37)
- 1968: Aladdin (U.S. No. 176)
- 1968: Peace (U.S. No. 24)
- 1969: Songs
- 1970: Dinner Music
- 1971: Hey, Love (as The New Rotary Connection)

Compilations

- 2006: Black Gold: The Very Best of Rotary Connection
