= Marshall Chess =

American record producer (born 1942)

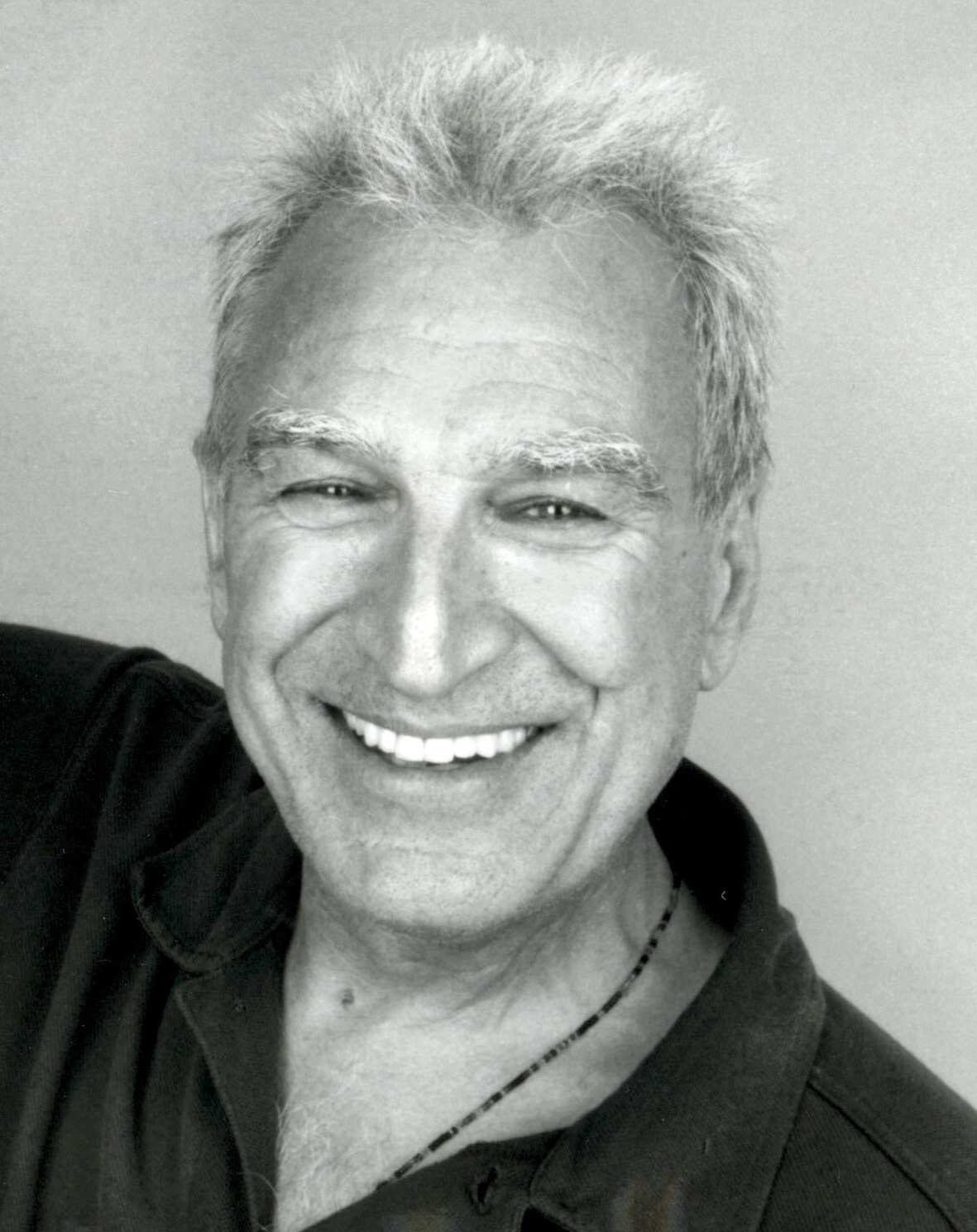
Marshall Chess in 2006

Marshall Chess (born March 13, 1942) is an American record producer, the son of Leonard Chess who co-founded Chess Records.

== Chess Records ==
Marshall worked for sixteen years with Chess Records; founded by his father Leonard and his uncle Phil. He did everything from pressing records and loading trucks to producing over 100 Chess Records projects and eventually heading up the label as President after their acquisition by GRT in 1969. In the late 1960s, Marshall also ran his own Cadet Concept imprint as a division of Chess Records. He created and produced the Rotary Connection, which became the springboard for Minnie Riperton's career. He signed John Klemmer and created a new format which was heralded as the first jazz-fusion album, Blowin' Gold. He signed the underground black rock legends Black Merda. His Cadet Concept also imported and released the only American hit, "Pictures of Matchstick Men", by the British rock group Status Quo. He also created and produced the controversial psychedelicized blues albums Electric Mud by Muddy Waters and The Howlin' Wolf Album by Howlin' Wolf. He restored his reputation by producing the jam album Fathers & Sons with Waters, Mike Bloomfield, Otis Spann, Paul Butterfield, Duck Dunn, Sam Lay and Buddy Miles in 1969.

== Rolling Stones Records ==
Departing from Chess Records in 1970 after the death of his father, Marshall was hired as the founding president of Rolling Stones Records, a record label controlled by the English rock group. Marshall Chess had known the band since 1964, when they had used Chess studios in Chicago to record songs while touring the United States. He was an active executive manager, touring with the band, and being involved with record production as well as outside business interests. In 1977, Chess resigned from Rolling Stones Records because he felt that too much drugs, sex, and rock n roll was undermining his health and his ability to work in the company. He was replaced by Earl McGrath on the advice of Atlantic Records head Ahmet Ertegün, the Stones' record distribution partner. Chess wound up with a heroin addiction and spent years trying various therapies from primal scream to LSD while living in New York's Catskills.

As well as music, Chess produced three films in the 1960s and 1970s: The Legend of Bo Diddley, Ladies and Gentlemen: The Rolling Stones, and the unreleased concert tour documentary Cocksucker Blues by Robert Frank.

== 1980s onward ==
During the 1980s and 1990s Marshall produced projects for both Sire Records and Island Records. From 1979 to 1981 he also managed as well as co-produced (with Ed Stasium) the Sire band, Alda-Reserve. He worked with rap star KRS-One, developing an audio comic book project, Break The Chain, for Marvel Comics.

In 1984, Marshall Chess became a partner in publishing company ARC Music, which he began actively heading in 1992. In 2003, Chess was featured in the film Godfathers and Sons directed by Marc Levin, for the PBS series The Blues, produced by Martin Scorsese. In the film, Marshall produces a hip hop version of the classic Chess track "Mannish Boy" featuring rappers Chuck D and Common recording with original members of the Electric Mud band.

In 1999 Chess founded the Czyz Records record label, with his cousin Kevin. The first record released on Czyz Records was the Murali Coryell album 2120, named after Chess' old Chicago address at 2120 South Michigan. Czyz (pronounced "Chez" or "Chaz") was the original Polish surname of Leonard and Phil Chess when they arrived in America from Poland.

In the year 2000, Marshall, his son Jamar Chess and Juan Carlos Barguil founded Sunflower Entertainment, a specialty music publishing and licensing house that focuses on independent Latin music and iconic American songs.

Marshall has been on Sirius Satellite Radio's Blues Channel since 2007 hosting the Chess Records Hour, a three times a week show featuring the music and history of Chess Records. Chess was executive music producer on two movies which dramatise the history of Chess Records, Cadillac Records (2008) and Who Do You Love? (2008), directed by Jerry Zaks.

In 2012, Marshall co-founded Revolution Songs, a music publishing and sync licensing company.

== Personal life ==
He is married to Robin Chess, a cooking teacher; they have a son, Jamar Chess.

Chess's relationship with his father was a tough one. He described Leonard as "a rough character. He never played catch with me. Instead, he taught me how to shake hands." And when Marshall, age 21, first started working at Chess records, he asked his father what he was supposed to do, and Leonard told him: "You stupid motherfucker, your job is watching me."
