= Deniece Williams discography =

This discography documents albums and singles released by American R&B and soul singer Deniece Williams.

== Albums ==
=== Studio albums ===
Year	Title	Peak chart positions							Certifications	Record label
Year	Title	US	US R&B	US Christ	US Gos	CAN	NLD	UK	Certifications	Record label
1976	This Is Niecy	33	3	—	—	—	—	26	RIAA: Gold; BPI: Silver	Columbia
1977	Song Bird	66	23	—	—	60	—	—		Columbia
1978	That's What Friends Are For (with Johnny Mathis)	19	14	—	—	30	23	16	RIAA: Gold; BPI: Gold	Columbia
1979	When Love Comes Calling	96	27	—	—	—	—	—		ARC/Columbia
1981	My Melody	74	13	—	—	—	—	—	RIAA: Gold	ARC/Columbia
1982	Niecy	20	5	—	—	—	—	—		ARC/Columbia
1983	I'm So Proud	54	10	—	—	—	—	—		Columbia
1984	Let's Hear It for the Boy	26	10	—	—	—	17	—		Columbia
1986	So Glad I Know	—	—	6	7	—	—	—		Sparrow
1986	Hot on the Trail	—	58	—	—	—	—	—		Columbia
1987	Water Under the Bridge	—	39	—	—	—	—	—		Columbia
1988	As Good as It Gets	—	48	—	—	—	—	—		Columbia
1989	Special Love	—	—	11	—	—	—	—		Sparrow/MCA
1991	Lullabies to Dreamland	—	—	—	—	—	—	—		Word
1996	Love Solves It All	—	—	—	—	—	—	—		P.A.R.
1998	This Is My Song	—	—	—	14	—	—	—		Harmony
2007	Love, Niecy Style	—	41	—	—	—	—	—		Shanachie
"—" denotes a recording that did not chart or was not released in that territory.

=== Compilation albums ===
Year	Title	Peak positions		Record label
Year	Title	US R&B	US Christ	Record label
1990	Change the World	—	—	CBS
1990	From the Beginning	—	35	Sparrow
1992	Too Much, Too Little, Too Late (with Johnny Mathis)	—	—	Sony Music
1994	Greatest Gospel Hits	—	—	Sparrow
1996	Gonna Take a Miracle: The Best of Deniece Williams	85	—	Columbia
2000	Love Songs	—	—	Columbia
2001	The Collection	—	—	Connoisseur/Sony Music
2016	Black Butterfly: The Essential Nicey	—	—	Big Break
"—" denotes a recording that did not chart or was not released in that territory.

== Singles ==
Year	Title	Peak chart positions										Certifications	Album
Year	Title	US Pop	US R&B	US A/C	US Dan	AUS	CAN	IRE	NLD	NZ	UK	Certifications	Album
1968	"Love Is Tears" ^{[A]}	—	—	—	—	—	—	—	—	—	—		Non-album single
1969	"Glorious Feeling" (with Lee Sain) ^{[B]}	—	—	—	—	—	—	—	—	—	—		Non-album single
1969	"I Don’t Wanna Cry" ^{[B]}	—	—	—	—	—	—	—	—	—	—		Non-album single
1969	"Come on Home to Me Baby" ^{[B]}	—	—	—	—	—	—	—	—	—	—		Non-album single
1970	"Mama, I Wish I Stayed at Home" ^{[B]}	—	—	—	—	—	—	—	—	—	—		Non-album single
1970	"Love Is Tears" (re-release) ^{[A]}	—	—	—	—	—	—	—	—	—	—		Non-album single
1970	"Yes, I'm Ready" ^{[A]}	—	—	—	—	—	—	—	—	—	—		Non-album single
1976	"Free"	25	2	38	31	57	32	8	14	—	1	BPI: Silver	This Is Niecy
1976	"It's Important to Me"	—	—	—	31	—	—	—	—	—	—		This Is Niecy
1977	"Cause You Love Me Baby"	—	74	—	—	—	—	—	—	—	—		This Is Niecy
1977	"That's What Friends Are For"	—	65	—	—	—	—	14	—	—	8	BPI: Silver	This Is Niecy
1977	"Baby, Baby My Love's All for You"	—	13	—	—	—	89	—	—	—	32		Song Bird
1978	"Season"	—	—	—	—	—	—	—	—	—	—		Song Bird
1978	"Too Much, Too Little, Too Late" (with Johnny Mathis)	1	1	1	—	6	3	2	3	2	3	RIAA: Gold; BPI: Silver	You Light Up My Life
1978	"You're All I Need to Get By" (with Johnny Mathis)	47	10	16	—	—	52	—	—	—	45		That's What Friends Are For
1978	"Just the Way You Are" (with Johnny Mathis)	—	—	—	—	—	—	—	42	—	—		That's What Friends Are For
1979	"I've Got the Next Dance"	73	26	—	1	—	—	—	—	—	—		When Love Comes Calling
1979	"I Found Love"	—	32	—	—	—	—	—	—	—	—		When Love Comes Calling
1981	"Time Heals Every Wound" (with Michael Zager Band)	—	—	—	—	—	—	—	—	13	—		Zager
1981	"What Two Can Do"	—	17	—	—	—	—	—	—	—	—		My Melody
1981	"It's Your Conscience"	—	45	—	—	—	—	—	16	—	—		My Melody
1981	"Silly"	53	11	—	—	—	—	—	—	—	—		My Melody
1982	"It's Gonna Take a Miracle"	10	1	6	—	—	41	—	—	9	—		Niecy
1982	"Waiting by the Hotline"	—	29	—	—	—	—	—	—	—	—		Niecy
1982	"Waiting"	—	72	—	—	—	—	—	—	—	—		Niecy
1983	"Do What You Feel"	—	9	—	—	—	—	—	—	—	—		I'm So Proud
1983	"I'm So Proud"	—	28	—	—	—	—	—	—	—	—		I'm So Proud
1983	"Heaven in Your Eyes"	—	—	—	—	—	—	—	—	—	—		I'm So Proud
1984	"Love Won't Let Me Wait" (with Johnny Mathis)	—	32	14	—	—	—	—	—	—	—		A Special Part of Me
1984	"Let's Hear It for the Boy"	1	1	3	1	3	1	2	5	2	2	RIAA: Platinum; BPI: Gold; MC: Gold	Let's Hear It for the Boy
1984	"Next Love"	81	22	—	17	—	—	—	—	—	—		Let's Hear It for the Boy
1984	"Black Butterfly"	—	22	—	—	—	—	—	—	—	—		Let's Hear It for the Boy
1986	"Wings of an Eagle"	—	—	—	—	—	—	—	—	—	—		So Glad I Know
1986	"Wiser and Weaker"	—	60	—	24	—	—	—	—	—	—		Hot on the Trail
1986	"Healing"	—	76	—	—	—	—	—	—	—	—		Hot on the Trail
1987	"Never Say Never"	—	6	—	23	—	—	—	—	—	—		Water Under the Bridge
1987	"I Confess"	—	24	—	—	—	—	—	—	—	—		Water Under the Bridge
1987	"Water Under the Bridge"	—	—	—	—	—	—	—	—	—	—		Water Under the Bridge
1988	"I Believe in You"	—	—	—	—	—	—	—	—	—	—		Water Under the Bridge
1988	"I Can't Wait"	66	8	—	—	—	—	—	—	—	—		As Good as It Gets
1988	"This Is as Good as It Gets"	—	29	—	—	—	—	—	—	—	—		As Good as It Gets
1989	"Every Moment"	—	55	—	—	—	—	—	—	—	—		Special Love
"—" denotes a recording that did not chart or was not released in that territory.

- ^{A} Singles credited to Denise Chandler
- ^{B} Singles credited to Deniece Chandler

== Covers ==
- "Glass Apple", "Diamond Eyes". Romantique - Seiko Ballads. 1991. Sony Records
