= From the Beginning (Deniece Williams album) =

Compilation album by Deniece Williams
- Released: 1990
- Recorded: 1976–1988
- Genre: Urban contemporary gospel, R&B, soul
- Length: 38:49
- Label: Sparrow Records
- Producer: Executive Producer: Deniece Williams

Deniece Williams chronology
Special Love (1989)	From the Beginning (1990)	Lullabies to Dreamland (1991)

Professional ratings
Review scores
Source	Rating
AllMusic	3/5 stars

From the Beginning is a gospel compilation album by American R&B singer Deniece Williams, released in 1990 on Sparrow Records. It is a collection of gospel songs Williams had recorded during her years at Columbia Records. Williams recorded one gospel song on each of her albums starting with 1976's "Watching Over" from This Is Niecy to her cover of the Michael Jackson Captain EO track "We Are Here to Change the World" from 1988's As Good As It Gets. The album also contains a live performance of "God Is Amazing" from the 27th Annual Grammy Awards, originally from her 1977 album Song Bird. From the Beginning debuted and peaked at number 35 on the Billboard Top Christian Albums chart.

== Track listing ==
No.	Title	Writer(s)	Producer(s)	Length
1.	"I Am Sure" (from As Good As It Gets)	Michael W. Smith, Mike Hudson	Brad Westering, Jay Gruska	4:28
2.	"I Believe in You" (from Water Under the Bridge)	David Raynor, Kenny Lamar	Steve Levine	4:28
3.	"My Prayer" (Interlude from When Love Comes Calling)	Deniece Williams	Ray Parker Jr.	0:23
4.	"Watching Over" (from This Is Niecy)	D. Williams, Maurice White, Freddie White, Verdine White, Jerry Peters, Al McKay	M. White, Charles Stepney	3:53
5.	"All I Need" (from As Good As It Gets)	Monte Moir	M. Moir	4:14
6.	"God Is Amazing" (live performance from the 27th Grammy Awards)	D. Williams		2:32
7.	"We Are Here to Change the World" (from As Good As It Gets)	Michael Jackson, John Barnes	B. Westering, J.Gruska	3:46
8.	"I Believe in Miracles" (from Niecy)	D. Williams, Bill Neale	D. Williams, Thom Bell	2:52
9.	"Whiter Than Snow" (from Let's Hear It for the Boy)	Traditional; arranged by D. Williams	D. Williams	3:44
10.	"Hold Me Tight" (from As Good As It Gets)	Betsy Cook	B. Westering, J. Gruska	3:41
11.	"My Prayer" (Interlude from When Love Comes Calling)	D. Williams	R. Parker, Jr.	0:23
12.	"Video" (from Hot on the Trail)	D. Williams, Fritz Baskett, Mont Seward	Greg Mathieson	4:24

== Charts ==
Chart (1991)	Peak position
US Billboard Top Christian Albums	35

=== Radio singles ===
Year	Singles	Peak positions	
Year	Singles	CCM AC	CCM CHR
1991	"I Am Sure"	4	7
1991	"All I Need"	20	—
