= As Good as It Gets (disambiguation) =

As Good as It Gets is a 1997 American romantic comedy film.

As Good as It Gets may also refer to:

- As Good as It Gets, a 1988 album by Deniece Williams (see Deniece Williams discography)
- As Good as It Gets: The Best Of, a 2001 compilation album by Gene
- "As Good as It Gets" (song), from the 1999 album Revelations by Gene
- ECW As Good as It Gets, a 1997 professional wrestling event

== See also ==
- "This Is as Good as It Gets", a 1988 song by Deniece Williams
