= Eagle Wing (disambiguation) =

Eagle Wing is a card game.

Eagle Wing, Eagle's Wing or Eagles Wing may refer to:

- the wing of an eagle
- Eagle's Wing, a 1979 film
- Eagles Wing Corporation, an American aircraft manufacturer
- 436th Airlift Wing, nickname Eagle Wing, a unit of the United States Air Force

== See also ==
- Wings of Eagles (disambiguation)
- On the Wings of an Eagle (disambiguation)
