= Christmas (Sparrow Records album) =

Compilation album by Various artists
- Released: 1988
- Studio: OmniSound Studios, OmniSound II, Center Stage Studios and Digital Recorders (Nashville, Tennessee); Knightlight Studios (Dallas, Texas); Whiteffield Studios (Santa Ana, California); Wayne Cook Studios (Glendale, California); Bill Schnee Studios (North Hollywood, California)
- Genre: Contemporary Christian music, Christmas music
- Length: 47:41
- Label: Sparrow Records
- Producer: Various

Professional ratings
Review scores
Source	Rating
AllMusic	3/5 stars

Christmas is a 1988 compilation Christmas album released by Sparrow Records. It features CCM artists' interpretation of the best-known Christmas songs done in their genres like rock ("Jingle Bell Rock" by Geoff Moore), pop ("O Holy Night" by Steve Camp), R&B ("Silent Night" by BeBe & CeCe Winans) and even mariachi ("Winter Wonderland" by Steve Taylor). Christmas also contains an original composition called "Home for the Holidays" sung by participating artists on this album. American R&B singer Deniece Williams was nominated for a Grammy for Best Gospel Performance, Female for her rendition of "Do You Hear What I Hear" at the 31st Grammy Awards. The album peaked at number 18 on the Billboard Top Inspirational Albums chart.

== Track listing ==
No.	Title	Writer(s)	Producer(s)	Length
1.	"Silent Night, Holy Night" (BeBe & CeCe Winans)	Franz X. Gruber, Joseph Mohr; arranged by BeBe Winans, Phil Naish, Billy Smiley	B. Smiley	5:43
2.	"Home for the Holidays" (Margaret Becker, Steve Camp, Steven Curtis Chapman, Geoff Moore, White Heart, BeBe & CeCe Winans)	Arranged by B. Smiley	B. Smiley	4:18
3.	"Little Drummer Boy" (White Heart)	Katherine Kennicott Davis, Henry Onorati, Harry Simeone; arranged by Mark Gersmehl, White Heart	B. Smiley	4:12
4.	"What Child Is This?" (Michael Card)	William Chatterton Dix; arranged by Norbert Putnam, M. Card	N. Putnam	2:47
5.	"Do You Hear What I Hear?" (Deniece Williams)	Noël Regney, Gloria Shayne; arranged by Brad Westering, Roby Duke	B. Westering, R. Duke	4:13
6.	"Winter Wonderland" (Steve Taylor)	Felix Bernard, Richard Bernhard Smith; arranged by S. Taylor, George Llanes, Harry Scorzo	S. Taylor	1:56
7.	"O Come, O Come, Emmanuel" (Margaret Becker)	Traditional; arranged by M. Becker, B. Smiley	B. Smiley	4:52
8.	"O Holy Night" (Steve Camp)	Adolphe Adam, John Sullivan Dwight; arranged by S. Camp	S. Camp	4:09
9.	"The First Noel" (Tim Miner)	Traditional (additional lyrics by T. Miner, Cindy Cruse, Tommy Sims); arranged by T. Miner, T. Sims	T. Miner, T. Sims	4:35
10.	"Jingle Bell Rock" (Geoff Moore)	Joe Beal, Jim Booth; arranged by B. Smiley, G. Moore	B. Smiley	2:59
11.	"Away in a Manger" (Steven Curtis Chapman)	Traditional; arranged by S. Curtis Chapman	B. Smiley	4:18
12.	"Angels We Have Heard on High" (Margaret Becker, Steven Curtis Chapman, Geoff Moore, White Heart, BeBe Winans)	Traditional; arranged by B. Smiley	B. Smiley	4:18

== Personnel ==
Lead vocalists

- BeBe Winans (1, 2, 12)
- CeCe Winans (1, 2)
- Steven Curtis Chapman (2, 11, 12)
- Margaret Becker (2, 7, 12)
- Steve Camp (2, 8)
- Rick Florian (2, 3, 12)
- Gordon Kennedy (2, 12)
- Geoff Moore (2, 10, 12)
- Michael Card (4)
- Deniece Williams (5)
- Steve Taylor (6)
- Tim Miner (9)

Musicians

- Phil Naish – keyboards (1, 2, 7, 8, 11, 12), acoustic piano (4)
- Mark Gershmel – keyboards (3)
- Carl Marsh – Fairlight CMI (4)
- Eric Persing – keyboards (5), programming (5)
- Roby Duke – additional keyboards (5)
- Rudy Van Eyken – accordion (6)
- Steve Camp – acoustic piano (8)
- Tim Miner – keyboards (9), drum programming (9), backing vocals (9)
- Geof Barkley – organ (10)
- Tom Hemby – guitars (1, 2, 7, 11, 12), acoustic guitar (8)
- Jerry McPherson – guitars (1, 7, 8)
- Dann Huff – guitars (2, 7, 12)
- Gordon Kennedy – guitars (3, 12)
- Teddy Irwin – guitars (4)
- Marty Walsh – guitars (5)
- George Llanes – guitars (6)
- José Hernández – vihuela (6), trumpet (6)
- Michael Gallagher – guitars (9)
- Dale Oliver – guitars (10)
- Steven Curtis Chapman – guitars (11), guitar solo (11), backing vocals (11)
- David Hungate – bass (1, 7, 8, 12)
- Mike Brignardello – bass (2, 11)
- Tommy Sims – bass (3, 9, 10), keyboards (9), drum programming (9), backing vocals (9)
- Craig Nelson – bass (4)
- Jose Arellano – guitarrón (6), Spanish vocals (6)
- Paul Leim – drums (1, 7, 8, 12), percussion (1, 7), timpani (7)
- Chris McHugh – drums (2, 3, 10, 11)
- Alex MacDougall – additional percussion (5)
- Lynn Nichols – percussion (6)
- Terry McMillan – percussion (10, 11)
- John Catchings – cello (4)
- Cindy Reynolds Wyatt – harp (4)
- Steve Pearlman – violin (6)
- Harry Scorzo – violin (6)
- Steve Tavaglione – saxophone (5)
- Ramone Acevedo – trumpet (6)
- Rick Florian – backing vocals (2, 3, 7, 10)
- David Mullen – backing vocals (2, 7, 10)
- Chris Rodriguez – backing vocals (2, 3, 7, 10, 11)
- Billy Smiley – backing vocals (3)
- Lynn Davis – backing vocals (5)
- Phil Perry – backing vocals (5)
- Cindy Cruse – backing vocals (9)
- Rob Johnson – backing vocals (9)
- Don Wallace – backing vocals (9)
- Herb Chapman – backing vocals (11)

== Production ==
- Billy Smiley – producer (1–3, 7, 8, 10–12)
- Norbert Putnam – producer (4)
- Roby Duke – producer (5)
- Brad Westering – producer (5)
- Steve Taylor – producer (6)
- Tim Miner – producer (9)
- Tommy Sims – producer (9)
- Barbara Catanzaro-Hearn – art direction
- Rossi Advertising – design
- Mark Tucker – photography

Technical

- David Schober – basic track recording (1–3, 7, 8, 10–12), mixing (1–3, 6–8, 10–12), overdub engineer (2, 8, 12), vocal engineer (2, 8, 12), recording (6)
- Billy Smiley – mixing (1–3, 7, 8, 10–12)
- Norbert Putnam – recording (4), mixing (4)
- Chris Taylor – recording (5), mixing (5)
- Loyd Harris – recording (9)
- Tim Miner – recording (9), mixing (9)
- Tommy Sims – recording (9), mixing (9)
- Win Kutz – mixing (9)
- Brent King – additional engineer (1, 7, 11)
- Ronnie Brookshire – additional engineer (2)
- Carry Summers – additional engineer (2, 10, 11)

== Charts ==
Chart (1988–89)	Peak position
US Top Inspirational Albums (Billboard)	18

=== Radio singles ===
Year	Singles	Peak positions
Year	Singles	CCM AC
1988–89	"Home for the Holidays"	31
