= I Confess =

"I Confess" can refer to:

- I Confess (Bewitched), 1968
- I Confess (magazine), a pulp magazine aimed at women published by Dell from 1922 to 1932
- I Confess (film), a 1953 film directed by Alfred Hitchcock
- "I Confess" (The Beat song), on the 1982 album Special Beat Service
- I Confess (Deniece Williams song), 1987
- "I Confess", a 1988 song by the Tom Tom Club featured on the 1988 album Boom Boom Chi Boom Boom
- I Confess, a 2004 album by Holly Palmer
- Confiteor, a general confession of sin recited at the beginning of Mass of the Roman Rite
- I Confess, the original name of the American television series Your Prize Story
