= Special Love =

Studio album by Deniece Williams
- Released: 1989
- Studios: The Entrerprise (Burbank, California); Roxx Studios and The Hook (North Hollywood, California); Jenbar Studios (Studio City, California); Cherokee Studios (Hollywood, California)
- Genres: Urban contemporary gospel, R&B, soul
- Length: 49:07
- Label: MCA/Sparrow
- Producers: Brad Westering; Roby Duke

Deniece Williams chronology
| As Good As It Gets (1988) | Special Love (1989) | From the Beginning (1990) |

Special Love is the second full-length gospel album by American R&B singer Deniece Williams, released in 1989 on MCA/Sparrow Records. Special Love peaked at number 11 on the Billboard Top Christian Albums chart.

== Overview ==
Williams' then-husband Brad Westering produced the album. The track "Healing" from her 1986 album Hot on the Trail was re-recorded for this LP. A set of North American CD editions of Special Love contained her take on "Do You Hear What I Hear?" as a bonus track. This song first appeared on a 1988 Yuletide album entitled Christmas co-produced by Christian singer-songwriter Roby Duke and released on Sparrow Records.

== Critical reception ==
Professional ratings
Review scores
| Source | Rating |
|---|---|
| AllMusic | 2/5 stars |
| Chicago Tribune | 3/4 stars |

In a review for the Chicago Tribune, Mitchell May rated the album three out of four stars. May wrote that Special Love avoids "excessive fanfare or overkill" and makes good use of Williams' "rich soprano" on every track. In the New York Daily News, Hugh Wyatt wrote that the album has "a refreshing absence of soap opera lyrics and other pop-music trash."

Williams was Grammy nominated alongside Natalie Cole in the category of Best R&B Performance by a Duo or Group for the track "We Sing Praises".

== Track listings ==
| No. | Title | Writer(s) | Length |
|---|---|---|---|
| 1. | "Special Love" | Deniece Williams, Lee Ritenour, Greg Mathieson | 3:56 |
| 2. | "Fire Inside My Soul" | Russ Hollingsworth, Mark Baldwin | 3:54 |
| 3. | "Healing" | Jeremy Lubbock, Paul Gordon | 4:40 |
| 4. | "Free" | Sheldon Gooch | 5:34 |
| 5. | "Every Moment" | D. Williams, David Raynor | 4:13 |
| 6. | "Who's Who" | D. Williams, Brad Westering, Roby Duke | 4:03 |
| 7. | "His Eye Is on the Sparrow" | Civilla D. Martin, Charles H. Gabriel; arranged by D. Williams, G. Mathieson | 5:05 |
| 8. | "Give It All to You" | D. Williams, D. Raynor, Kenny Lamar | 4:58 |
| 9. | "Somebody Loves You" | D. Williams, Bob Baldwin, Porter Carroll, Jr. | 3:48 |
| 10. | "We Sing Praises" (duet with Natalie Cole) | D. Williams, D. Raynor, Jay Gruska | 4:50 |

North American bonus track
| No. | Title | Writer(s) | Length |
|---|---|---|---|
| 11. | "Do You Hear What I Hear?" | Noël Regney, Gloria Shayne | 4:16 |

Note: "Do You Hear What I Hear?" was produced by Brad Westering and Roby Duke; all other tracks produced by Westering.

== Personnel ==
Musicians

- Deniece Williams – vocals
- Eric Persing – keyboards (1, 4, 6, 9, 11), programming (1, 4, 6, 9, 11), sequencing (1, 4, 6, 9)
- Aaron Zigman – additional keyboards (1, 2, 4–6, 9, 10), keyboards (8)
- Todd Yvega – Synclavier (1–3, 5, 7, 9, 10)
- Jay Gruska – keyboards (2, 5), programming (2, 5), sequencing (2, 5)
- Greg Phillinganes – synthesizers (2, 9), finger snaps (9)
- Casey Young – additional programming (2, 5)
- Randy Kerber – acoustic piano (3, 10)
- Jeremy Lubbock – keyboards (3)
- Tom Keane – acoustic piano (7)
- Roby Duke – additional keyboards (11)
- Paul Jackson Jr. – guitars (1, 2, 5)
- Michael Landau – guitars (3, 4, 6, 7, 9, 10), guitar solo (5), acoustic guitar (8)
- James Harrah – guitars (8)
- Marty Walsh – guitars (11)
- Neil Stubenhaus – bass (3, 7)
- Freddie Washington – bass (8, 10)
- Dennis Holt – drum overdubs (3), additional drum overdubs (4–6, 9)
- John Keane – drums (7, 10)
- Luis Conte – percussion (3–8, 10)
- Alex MacDougall – additional percussion (11)
- Kirk Whalum – saxophone (2, 6), soprano saxophone (4)
- Brandon Fields – electronic wind instrument (7, 8)
- Steve Tavaglione – saxophone (11)
- Bill Reichenbach Jr. – trombone (10)
- Gary Grant – trumpet (10)
- Jerry Hey – trumpet (10)

Music arrangements

- Roby Duke – arrangements (1, 4, 6, 9)
- Eric Persing – arrangements (1, 4, 6, 9)
- Brad Westering – arrangements (1, 6, 7, 9)
- Jay Gruska – arrangements (2, 5, 10), string arrangements (7, 10)
- Jeremy Lubbock – string arrangements (3)
- Greg Mathieson – arrangements (3)
- Deniece Williams – arrangements (7)
- Dave Raynor – arrangements (8)
- Jerry Hey – horn arrangements (10)

Background vocalists

- Chris Eaton – backing vocals (1, 5, 6, 10)
- Lance Ellington – backing vocals (1, 5, 6, 10), step-out vocals (6)
- Josie James – backing vocals (1, 4, 5, 7, 10)
- Phil Perry – backing vocals (1, 4, 5, 10, 11)
- Deniece Williams – backing vocals (1, 2, 4–10)
- Greg Phillinganes – backing vocals (2)
- Julia Tillman Waters – backing vocals (2)
- Maxine Waters Willard – backing vocals (2)
- Oren Waters – backing vocals (2)
- Mark Williamson – backing vocals (6, 9)
- Roby Duke – backing vocals (7, 10)
- Fran Logan – backing vocals (7, 10)
- Rick Logan – backing vocals (7, 10)
- Mike Motley – backing vocals (7)
- Natalie Cole – vocals (10)
- Lynn Davis – backing vocals (11)

=== Technical and design ===
- Richard McKernan – recording
- Mick Guzauski – mixing at Conway Studios (Hollywood, California) and Devonshire Sound Studios (North Hollywood, California)
- Chris Taylor – recording (11), mixing (11)
- Spencer Chrislu – additional engineer
- Ian Eales – additional engineer
- Michael Frenchik – additional engineer
- Larry Goodwin – additional engineer, mix assistant
- Carl Lange – additional engineer
- Elliott Peters – additional engineer
- Jonathan Goodwin – assistant engineer
- Scott Gordon – assistant engineer, mix assistant
- Jay Lean – assistant engineer
- Derek Marcil – assistant engineer, mix assistant
- Chrisa Sadd – assistant engineer
- Marnie Riley – mix assistant
- Doug Sax – mastering at The Mastering Lab (Hollywood, California)
- Barbara Hearn – art direction
- Stan Everson Design – design
- Randee St. Nicholas – photography

== Charts ==
| Chart (1989) | Peak position |
|---|---|
| US Billboard Top Christian Albums | 11 |

=== Radio singles ===
| Year | Singles | Peak positions | | |
| Year | Singles | CCM AC | CCM CHR | US R&B |
|---|---|---|---|---|
| 1989 | "Healing" | 1 | 3 | — |
| 1989 | "Every Moment" | 2 | 3 | 55 |
| 1990 | "We Sing Praises" (with Natalie Cole) | 7 | 23 | — |
| 1990 | "Somebody Loves You" | 7 | 8 | — |
| 1990 | "Fire Inside My Soul" | — | 9 | — |
