= This Time (Taral Hicks album) =

Studio album by Taral Hicks
- Released: September 16, 1997
- Recorded: 1996–1997
- Genres: R&B, new jack swing
- Label: Motown
- Producers: Teddy Riley, Terry Williams, Gerald Baillergeau, Sprague "Doogie" Williams, Chase Chad Hugo, Chad "Dr. Seuss" Elliott, Victor Merritt, Narada Michael Walden, Erik "E Smooth" Hicks, Edward "DJ Eddie F" Ferrell

Singles from This Time
- 1. "Ooh, Ooh Baby" Released: June 18, 1996; 2. "Distant Lover" Released: August 26, 1997; 3. "Silly" Released: November 25, 1997

This Time is the only album by American singer Taral Hicks. It is noted for its feature of various collaborations from the likes of Teddy Riley, Narada Michael Walden and future stars including Missy Elliott, DJ Eddie F and Chad Hugo of the Neptunes. The album also featured background vocals by siblings Tina, Miriam and Erik Hicks, who co-wrote two of the album's tracks: "A Lil' Somethin'" and "Whoopty Whoop".

== Singles ==
Three singles were released from the album. The first was the love ballad "Ooh, Ooh Baby" featuring Missy "Misdemeanor" Elliott, which was released on June 18, 1996, and peaked at No. 81 on the Billboard Hot R&B Singles chart.

The second and third singles, "Distant Lover" and "Silly" (a cover from singer Deniece Williams) were released a year later and peaked at Nos. 60 and 54, respectively, on the same chart. "Silly" also reached No. 4 on the Billboard Bubbling Under Hot 100 Singles chart.

== Track listing ==
No.	Title	Writer(s)	Producer(s)	Length
1.	"Anyway"	Sheri Blair, Teddy Riley	Teddy Riley	4:52
2.	"Distant Lover"	Sprague Williams	Sprague "Doogie" Williams	4:12
3.	"How Can I Get over You"	Karen Anderson, Sheri Blair, Chad Hugo	Chase Chad Hugo	4:30
4.	"Silly"	Fritz Baskett, Clarence McDonald, Deniece Williams	Edward Ferrell	6:20
5.	"Ooh, Ooh Baby" (feat. Missy "Misdemeanor" Elliott)	Melissa Elliott, Terry Williams, Chad Elliott	Terry Williams, Chad "Dr. Seuss" Elliott	3:52
6.	"This Time"	Gerald Baillergeau, Mary Brown, Victor Merritt	Gerald Baillergeau, Victor Merritt	4:21
7.	"Stay (4 a Little While)"	Gerald Baillergeau, Victor Merritt	Gerald Baillergeau, Victor Merritt	5:23
8.	"A Lil' Somethin'"	James Fischer, Erik Hicks, Narada Michael Walden	Erik "E Smooth" Hicks	4:08
9.	"Whoopty Whoop"	Erik Hicks, Narada Michael Walden	Narada Michael Walden	3:58
10.	"Don't Let the Feelin' Go Away"	Sally Jo Dakota, Taral Hicks, Narada Michael Walden	Narada Michael Walden	4:14
11.	"I Wish You Were Here"	Sally Jo Dakota, Taral Hicks, Narada Michael Walden	Narada Michael Walden	4:16
12.	"Get With This"	Gerald Baillergeau, Victor Merritt	Gerald Baillergeau, Victor Merritt	3:41

Japan bonus track
No.	Title	Length
12.	"Never Thought You'd Leave Me""	3:59
