= From the Beginning =

From the Beginning may refer to:

- "From the Beginning" (song), a 1972 song by Emerson, Lake & Palmer
- From the Beginning (box set), a box set by Emerson, Lake & Palmer
- From the Beginning (Small Faces album), 1967
- From the Beginning (Deniece Williams album), 1990
- From the Beginning, an album by Yolandita Monge
- From the Beginning, an album by The Damned
