= Waiting by the Hotline =

Single by Deniece Williams

from the album Niecy
- B-side: "Love Notes"
- Released: 1982
- Studio: Sigma Sound, Philadelphia, Pennsylvania
- Length: 3:39
- Label: ARC/Columbia
- Songwriter(s): Deniece Williams; Thom Bell
- Producer(s): Thom Bell

Deniece Williams singles chronology
"It's Gonna Take a Miracle" (1982)	"Waiting by the Hotline" (1982)	"Waiting" (1982)

"Waiting by the Hotline" is a song written by Thom Bell and Deniece Williams and recorded by Williams for her 1982 album Niecy. Produced by Bell, it was released as a single in 1982 by ARC/Columbia Records, reaching number 29 on the US Billboard Hot Soul Singles chart.

== Critical reception ==
Crispin Cioe of High Fidelity noted how Williams' strong, high soprano can handle Bell's more muscular arrangements with flair".

== Charts ==
Chart (1982)	Peak position
US Hot Soul Singles (Billboard)	29
