= Aunt Bam's Place =

2011 American stage play

- Written by: Tyler Perry
- Characters: Aunt Bam, Stewart, Mona, Gloria, Bryson and Denise
- Original language: English
- Subject: Family
- Genre: Comedy-Drama
- Setting: Aunt Bam’s House

Premiere
- Date premiered: August 30, 2011
- Place premiered: Atlanta

Aunt Bam's Place is a 2011 American stage play created, produced, written, and directed by Tyler Perry. It stars Cassi Davis as Aunt Bam and Melonie Daniels as Gloria. The live performance released on DVD on June 12, 2012 was recorded live in Atlanta at the Cobb Energy Performing Arts Centre in August 2011. This production wasn't available on tour and had only 2 premiere performances.

== Production ==
The play was produced during an especially busy period of Perry's life, when he also wrote and produced 42 TV sitcom episodes and two other full-length filmed plays for Oprah Winfrey's OWN Network.

== Plot ==
One weekend, Aunt Bam's nephew-in-law Stewart is granted a court-ordered visitation with his children. Although his new, much-younger wife Mona is a bundle of nerves, Stewart seizes the opportunity to reconnect with his children, whom he loves dearly. Then their mother, his ex-wife Gloria, shows up drunk. It will take Madea's partner-in-crime, Bam, to tame this situation and set a few things straight.

== Cast ==
- Cassi Davis as Aunt Bam
- Maurice Lauchner as Stewart Peterson
- Taral Hicks as Mona Peterson
- Melonie Daniels as Gloria Peterson
- Paris Bennett as Denise Peterson
- Jeffery Lewis as Bryson Peterson

== The Band ==
- Ronnie Garrett - Musical Director & Bass Guitar
- Derek Scott - Guitar
- Marcus Williams - Drums
- Michael Burton - Saxophone
- Justin Gilbert - Keyboards
- Aaron Draper - Percussion
- Natalie Ragins - Keyboards
- Melvin Jones - Trumpet
- Rashad Henderson - Background Vocals
- Raquel Britton - Background Vocals
- Tasha Danae - Background Vocals

== Musical Numbers ==
All songs written and/or produced by Tyler Perry and Elvin D. Ross.

- Gospel Medley
1. "Were You There" - Denise
2. "Walk With Me" - Stewart
3. "I'll Fly Away" - Mona
- "You Ain't Got No Love" - Aunt Bam
- "Son" - Stewart
- "I Wish I Knew" - Denise
- "But It's Okay" - Mona
- "Broken, Battered, Still Blessed" - Bryson
- "You Don't Understand" - Gloria
- "I Don't Feel No Ways Tired" - Aunt Bam, Mona, Stewart, Gloria and Company
