= That's What Friends Are For (Deniece Williams song) =

Single by Deniece Williams

from the album This Is Niecy
- B-side: "Watching Over"
- Released: July 1977
- Genre: R&B
- Length: 4:27
- Label: Columbia
- Songwriter(s): D. Williams, C. McDonald, F. Baskett, L. Groves
- Producer(s): Maurice White, Charles Stepney

Deniece Williams singles chronology
"Free" (1976)	"That's What Friends Are For" (1977)	"Baby, Baby My Love's All for You" (1977)

"That's What Friends Are For" is a song recorded by Deniece Williams, released as a single in July 1977 by Columbia Records. The single reached No. 8 on the UK Singles Chart. "That's What Friends Are For" was also certified Silver in the UK by the BPI.

== Overview ==
The song was produced by Maurice White and Charles Stepney, and is from Williams' 1976 debut album, This Is Niecy.

== Cover versions ==
"That's What Friends Are For" was covered by Sheena Easton on her 2000 album Fabulous.
