= Silly (song) =

Single by Deniece Williams

from the album My Melody
- Released: August 1981
- Recorded: 1981
- Studio: Sigma Sound, Philadelphia, Pennsylvania
- Genre: Soul; R&B
- Length: 5:57
- Label: Columbia/ARC
- Songwriter(s): Fritz Baskett; Clarence McDonald; Deniece Williams
- Producer(s): Thom Bell; Deniece Williams

Deniece Williams singles chronology
"It's Your Conscience" (1981)	"Silly" (1981)	"It's Gonna Take a Miracle" (1982)

"Silly" is a song written by Fritz Baskett, Clarence McDonald and Deniece Williams and performed by Williams. The soulful ballad was released off Williams' My Melody album in 1981 and became the most successful track off the album reaching as high as number fifty-three on the Billboard Hot 100 becoming an even bigger success on the R&B chart where it peaked at number eleven. It has since gone on to become one of Williams' most requested songs over a career that has spanned over thirty years. The song featured production by Williams and respected Philly soul producer Thom Bell. The song was recorded at Philadelphia's acclaimed Sigma Sound Studios. The song would be later covered by singer Taral Hicks nearly two decades later in 1997 and was released as the second single off Hicks' debut album becoming a hit on the R&B chart.

One of Williams' influences, Patti LaBelle, covered the song for her 2005 album, Classic Moments. R&B girl group Cherish recorded the song for their second album The Truth in 2008. Singer Monica sampled the instrumental intro and bridge of the song for her number-one R&B hit, "Everything to Me" and interpolated Williams' ending high notes at the end of the song. Monica and Williams sang "Everything to Me" and "Silly" together at the BET Awards in 2010. The-Dream sampled the song for his song "Silly", which featured Casha, on his free mixtape 1977.

== Charts ==
Chart (1981)	Peak position
US Billboard Hot 100	53
US Hot Soul Singles (Billboard)	11
