= Black Butterfly (song) =

Single by Deniece Williams

from the album Let's Hear It for the Boy
- Released: 1984
- Length: 4:25
- Label: Columbia AS 1941 (US)
- Songwriter(s): Barry Mann, Cynthia Weil
- Producer(s): George Duke

Deniece Williams singles chronology
"Next Love" (1984)	"Black Butterfly" (1984)	"Wiser And Weaker" (1986)

"Black Butterfly" is a song written by the song-writing duo Barry Mann and Cynthia Weil in 1982, and most famously recorded by American recording artist Deniece Williams. Williams' recording was released in 1984 for Columbia Records and is on her 1984 album Let's Hear it for the Boy. The B-side of the single is the song "Blind Dating", also featured on the album.

The single peaked at number 22 on the US Billboard Hot Soul Songs chart.

== Overview ==
"Black Butterfly" was produced by George Duke and composed by Barry Mann with Cynthia Weil. The single's b-side was a song called "Blind Dating". Both tunes came from Deniece Williams' 1984 studio album Let's Hear It For The Boy.

== Covers ==
"Black Butterfly" has been covered by Patti LaBelle on the 2004 soundtrack to Johnson Family Vacation, Tamia on her 2015 album Love Life and Will Downing on his 2016 album Black Pearls.

== Personnel ==
- Deniece Williams – vocals
- George Duke – Prophet-5
- Russell Ferrante – Rhodes electric piano, acoustic piano
- Michael Sembello – guitars
- Nathan East – bass guitar
- Ricky Lawson – drums
- Richard Elliot – Lyricon

=== Production ===
- George Duke – producer
- Mitch Gibson – recording, second engineer

== Charts ==
Chart (1984)	Peak position
US Hot Black Singles (Billboard)	22
