= What Two Can Do =

Single by Deniece Williams

from the album My Melody
- Released: 1981
- Studio: Sigma Sound, Philadelphia, Pennsylvania
- Length: 3:47
- Label: ARC/Columbia
- Songwriter(s): Deniece Williams
- Producer(s): Thom Bell

Deniece Williams singles chronology
"Time Heals Every Wound (with Michael Zager Band)" (1981)	"What Two Can Do" (1981)	"t's Your Conscience" (1981)

"What Two Can Do" is a song written and recorded by American singer Deniece Williams for her 1981 album My Melody. It was produced by Thom Bell and released as a single in 1981 by ARC/Columbia Records. It reached number 17 on the US Billboard Hot Soul Singles chart.

== Critical reception ==
The Philadelphia Inquirer called "What Two Can Do" an "appealing upbeat tune."

== Charts ==
Chart (1981)	Peak position
US Hot Soul Singles	17
