= Ooh, Ooh Baby (Taral Hicks song) =

Single by Taral Hicks featuring Missy Elliott

from the album This Time
- Released: June 18, 1996
- Recorded: 1995
- Genre: R&B; hip-hop
- Length: 3:53
- Label: Motown
- Songwriters: Melissa Elliott; Terry Williams
- Producers: Dr. Ceuss; T-Rock

Taral Hicks singles chronology
"Ooh, Ooh Baby" (1996)	"Distant Lover" (1997)

Missy Elliott singles chronology
"That's What Little Girls Are Made Of" (1993)	"Ooh, Ooh Baby" (1996)	"The Things That You Do" (1996)

"Ooh, Ooh Baby" is the debut single by American R&B singer Taral Hicks. The song features a guest appearance by then–unknown Missy Elliott, who was at the time an ex-member of DeVante Swing's act Sista. The song was released on June 18, 1996, as the first single from Hicks' debut album, This Time (1997). A music video for the song was directed by Hype Williams, but it was never released.

The song debuted on the Billboard Hot R&B Singles chart on July 6, 1996, and peaked at No. 81 the following week.

"Ooh, Ooh Baby" has also been noted to be Elliott's second featured appearance on a single as a solo artist; the first being "That's What Little Girls Are Made Of" in 1993.

== Chart performance ==
Charts (1996)	Peak position
US Billboard Hot R&B Singles	81
