= On the Wings of an Eagle =

On the Wings of an Eagle or Wings of an Eagle may refer to:

- On the Wings of an Eagle (album), by John Hicks, 2006
- "Wings of an Eagle", a 1972 song by Russell Morris
  - Wings of an Eagle and Other Great Hits, a 1973 album by Russell Morris
- Wings Of An Eagle, a 1976 album by Mike Deasy
- "On the Wings of an Eagle", a song by John Denver on the 1998 album Forever, John
- "On the Wings of an Eagle", a song by Raven from the 1997 album Life's a Bitch
- "Wings of an Eagle", a song by Steve Bell from the 1992 album Deep Calls to Deep
- "Wings of an Eagle", a song by Ziggy Marley from the 2009 album Family Time
- "Wings of an Eagle", a 1986 song by Deniece Williams
- "Wings of an Eagle", a 1981 song by Bobby Goldsboro
- "Wings of an Eagle", a 1941 episode of radio series Columbia Workshop

== See also ==
- Wings of Eagles (disambiguation), including "On Wings of Eagles"
- Griffin, a legendary creature with the wings of an eagle
