= Taral Hicks =

American actress (born 1974)

- Born: September 21, 1974 (age 52); The Bronx, New York City, U.S.
- Education: Grace Dodge Vocational High School
- Occupations: Actress; singer
- Years active: 1993–present
- Spouse: Loren Dawson (m. 2001)
- Family: D'atra Hicks (sister)
- Musical career
- Genres: R&B; new jack swing; soul
- Label: Motown
- Website: twitter.com/TaralHicks

Taral Hicks (born September 21, 1974) is an American actress and R&B singer. Hicks is best known for her acting in such films as 1993's American crime drama film A Bronx Tale and her 1997 debut R&B studio album This Time which featured a cover of Deniece Williams' "Silly" that peaked at No. 4 on Billboard Bubbling Under Hot 100 Singles.

Raised in Bronx, NY, Hicks graduated from Grace Dodge in 1993.

== Career ==
=== Acting ===
Hicks began her film career with a role in the critically acclaimed 1993 film, A Bronx Tale. Her subsequent film roles were small: 1995's Just Cause with Sean Connery and Laurence Fishburne, and 1996's Educating Matt Waters and The Preacher's Wife with Whitney Houston. She appeared in the movie Belly in 1998. In 2000, she appeared on screen in the short film, Are You Cinderella?, with actor Wood Harris. Her later film roles were in independent films such as 2005's The Salon, with Vivica A. Fox, Dondre Whitfield, and Darrin Henson; 2006's Forbidden Fruits with Ella Joyce, Fredro Starr, and R&B singer Keith Sweat; 2007's Humenetomy; and 2010's Ex$pendable. Hicks featured in the HBO television series Subway Stories in 1997. Two guest roles followed: 2002's 100 Centre Street in the episode titled "Fathers", and a 2003 episode of Soul Food: The Series titled "The New Math".

Hicks co-starred in the musical stage play Tyler Perry's Aunt Bam's Place with Paris Bennett, Cassi Davis, Jeffrey Lewis, Maurice Lauchner, and Melonie Daniels. It had a 3-day run beginning August 30, 2011 in Atlanta, Georgia (Cobb Energy Center) and was filmed for a DVD release on June 12, 2012.

=== Music ===
In 1995, Hicks signed a deal with Motown Records and released an album titled This Time. The single "Ooh, Ooh Baby", written by and featuring Missy Elliott, charted on the Billboard R&B singles chart. However, the lead single intended to debut her singing career was "Distant Lover", an uptempo track produced by Teddy Riley. The album did not take off until the second single, "Silly", a remake of the classic R&B hit by Deniece Williams, was released. Featuring a black-and-white music video directed by Hype Williams, the single charted well on the R&B chart. After collaborating on the video for "Silly", Williams cast Hicks as in his directorial film debut, 1998's Belly, as Keisha, DMX's girlfriend. The video for "Silly" appeared in one of the film's scenes. Hicks has expressed interest in pursuing a career in gospel music.

== Personal life ==
Hicks is a 1993 graduate of Grace Dodge Vocational High School in the Bronx, New York. She is the younger sister of actress and singer D'atra Hicks. In 1999, Hicks began dating Loren Dawson, and the couple married in 2001 and share two children.

Hicks was announced as an honorary member of Zeta Phi Beta on July 11, 2026, during the sorority's International Grand Boule in Nashville, Tennessee.

== Discography ==
=== Singles ===
Year	Song	Peak positiona	
Year	Song	US Pop	US R&B
1996	"Ooh, Ooh Baby" (featuring Missy "Misdemeanor" Elliott)	—	81
1997	"Distant Lover"	—	60
1998	"Silly"	104	54
1998	"How Can I Get Over You"	—	—

Soundtracks

- 1996: The Associate (on "Yes We Can Can" with Chantay Savage, LaShanda Reese and The Pointer Sisters)

== Filmography ==
=== Film ===
Year	Title	Role	Notes
1993	A Bronx Tale	Jane Williams	
1995	Just Cause	Lena Brown	
1996	The Preacher's Wife	Teen	
1997	Subway Stories	Woman with Flowers	TV movie
1998	Belly	Keisha	
2000	Are You Cinderella?	Homeless Woman	Short
2005	The Salon	Trina	
2006	Forbidden Fruits	Nicole Walters	Video
2007	Humenetomy	Member of Gospel Choir	
2010	Ex$pendable	Brenda	Video
2012	Aunt Bam's Place	Mona	
2014	The Hilltop Barbershop	Member of the church choir	
2016	Where Hearts Lie	Shante Jackson	
2016	A Sub in the Brick City	Detective Tammy	Short
2016	The 1 Closest 2 U	Le-Le	
2016	Supposition	Cheryl Jameson	
2016	King of Newark	Mistress	
2017	The Hills	Dr. Welker	
2017	North Housing Authority	Billy Blaire News Caster	
2018	King of Newark 2	Lawyer	
2020	Bitch Lover	Mrs. Marshall	
2022	Gaslight	Kendra	
2022	Sleepyhead	Yvonne	
2022	A Second Chance	Shena	
2022	A Father's Pride	Sister Rose	

=== Television ===
Year	Title	Role	Notes
2002	100 Centre Street	-	Episode: "Fathers"
2003	Soul Food	Naomi	Episode: "The New Math"
2018	Illusions	Kelly	Main Cast
2020	Chase Street	Beverly Johnson	Main Cast
