= Wiser and Weaker =

"Wiser And Weaker"

Single by Deniece Williams

from the album Hot on the Trail
- Released: 1986
- Label: Columbia
- Songwriter(s): Deniece Williams, Fritz Baskett, Greg Mathieson
- Producer(s): Greg Mathieson

Deniece Williams singles chronology
"Black Butterfly" (1984)	"Wiser And Weaker" (1986)

"Wiser and Weaker" is a single by Deniece Williams released in 1986 on Columbia Records. The song reached No. 24 on the Billboard Dance Club Songs chart.

"Wiser and Weaker" was produced by Greg Mathieson who wrote the song along with Deniece Williams and Fritz Baskett.

== Critical reception ==
Harry Rich of The Morning Call called the song "danceworthy, and dazzlingly aggressive".

== Credits ==
- Julia Waters – backing vocals
- Maxine Waters – backing vocals
- Oren Waters – backing vocals
- "Ready" Freddie Washington – bass
- Carlos Vega – drums
- Michael Landau – guitar
- Paul Jackson Jr. – guitar
- Tommy Mandel – additional keyboards
- Greg Mathieson – keyboards, synthesizer
- Lenny Castro – percussion
- Steve Thompson – additional producer, remix
- Michael Barbiero – additional producer, remix
