= So Glad I Know =

Studio album by Deniece Williams
- Released: 1986
- Studio: Mama Jo's Studio and George Tobin Studios (North Hollywood, California); The Enterprise (Burbank, California); Music Grinder and LeGonk Studios (Hollywood, California); Pinebrook Studios (Alexandria, Indiana); Triad Studios (Seattle, Washington)
- Genre: Urban contemporary gospel, R&B, soul
- Length: 38:30
- Label: Sparrow
- Producer: Brad Westering

Deniece Williams chronology
Let's Hear It for the Boy (1984)	So Glad I Know (1986)	Hot on the Trail (1986)

Professional ratings
Review scores
Source	Rating
AllMusic	2/5 stars

So Glad I Know is the first gospel album by American R&B singer Deniece Williams, released in 1986 on Sparrow Records. The album reached No. 6 on the Billboard Top Christian Albums chart and No. 7 on the Billboard Top Gospel Albums chart. So Glad I Know was also Grammy nominated in the category of Best Gospel Performance, Female.

== Overview ==
So Glad I Know was Williams' first full-length gospel album. With this came a new recording of "They Say", originally from her 1983 album I'm So Proud, now a duet with fellow Gospel singer Sandi Patti. At the 29th Annual Grammy Awards the said duo won a Grammy for Best Gospel Performance by a Duo or Group. Williams also won a Grammy in the category of Best Soul Gospel Performance, Female for her rendition of the hymn "I Surrender All".

== Track listing ==
No.	Title	Writer(s)	Length
1.	"Just in Time"	Russ Hollingsworth, John Rosasco	3:49
2.	"Wings of an Eagle"	David Flaherty	4:58
3.	"My Soul Desire"	Mark Baldwin, Niles Borop	4:14
4.	"They Say" (duet with Sandi Patti)	Terri McFaddin, Skip Scarborough	5:20
5.	"Straight Ahead"	Deniece Williams, Richard Souther	4:10
6.	"So Glad I Know"	D. Williams, Jay Gruska	4:05
7.	"I Surrender All"	Judson W. Van DeVenter, Winfield S. Weeden	4:13
8.	"If We Are the Light"	D. Williams, Michael Peterson, Billy Smiley	3:44
9.	"What You Do for Me"	D. Williams, Chaka Khan, Kathy Wakefield, Tony Maiden	3:57

== Personnel ==
- Deniece Williams – vocals, arrangements (4), backing vocals (6)
- Randy Waldman – keyboards (1), synthesizer programming (1)
- Jay Gruska – additional synthesizers (1, 3), arrangements (1, 3, 6), string arrangements (3, 7)
- Greg Mathieson – keyboards (2, 4, 7–9), arrangements (2, 4, 7–9)
- Alan Pasqua – additional synthesizers (2, 4, 9), keyboards (3, 6), synthesizer programming (3, 6), keyboard solo (6)
- Casey Young – programming (2, 8, 9)
- Todd Yvega – Synclavier programming (3, 7)
- Richard Souther – keyboards (5), arrangements (5)
- Eric Persing – synthesizers (5)
- Dann Huff – guitars (1, 2, 4, 9)
- James Harrah – guitars (3, 6)
- Paul Jackson Jr. – guitars (7, 8)
- Nathan East – bass (1, 3, 4, 6)
- Freddie Washington – bass (2, 7–9)
- John Robinson – drums (1, 3–7, 9)
- Michael Fisher – percussion (1, 3–6)
- Calvin Smith – French horn solo (3)
- Steve Tavaglione – soprano saxophone (8)
- David Boruff – saxophone solo (9)
- Brad Westering – arrangements (4)
- Roosevelt Christmas – backing vocals (1, 3, 5, 8, 9)
- Josie James – backing vocals (1, 3, 5, 8, 9)
- George Merrill – backing vocals (1, 3, 5, 8, 9)
- Kathy Baumgardner – backing vocals (2)
- Billie Bell – backing vocals (2)
- Joy Burchett – backing vocals (2)
- Esther Dekker – backing vocals (2)
- David Flaherty – backing vocals (2)
- Ron Gollner – backing vocals (2)
- Angie Reed – backing vocals (2)
- Sheila Shipley – backing vocals (2)
- Becky Smith – backing vocals (2)
- Deanna Trygg – backing vocals (2)
- Rick Uhles – backing vocals (2)
- Rob Watson – backing vocals (2)
- Roseanne Watson – backing vocals (2)
- Susan Westerang – backing vocals (2)
- Sandi Patti – vocals (4)
- Diane Brown – backing vocals (3, 7)
- Warren Ham – backing vocals (3, 7)
- Julia Tillman Waters – backing vocals (3)
- Maxine Waters Willard – backing vocals (3)
- Oren Waters – backing vocals (3)
- Avah Ham – backing vocals (7)
- John Laird – backing vocals (7)
- Rick Logan – backing vocals (7)

=== Production ===
- Brad Westering – producer
- Frank Wolf – engineer, remixing
- John Bolt – additional engineer
- Steve Ford – additional engineer, remix assistant
- Mitch Gibson – additional engineer
- Alan Hirshberg – additional engineer
- Larry Nefzger – additional engineer
- Steve Hall – mastering at Future Disc (Hollywood, California)
- Peter Nomura – artwork, design
- Stan Everson Design, Inc. – artwork, design
- Marc Raboy – cover photography, make-up
- Danny Wintrode – hair stylist

== Charts ==
Chart (1986)	Peak position
US Billboard Top Christian Albums	6
US Billboard Top Gospel Albums	7

=== Radio singles ===
Year	Singles	Peak positions	
Year	Singles	CCM AC	CCM CHR
1986	"My Soul Desire"	3	—
1986	"So Glad I Know"	5	14
1987	"They Say" (with Sandi Patti)	1	1
1987	"Wings of an Eagle"	4	6

== Accolades ==
Grammy Awards

Year	Winner	Category
1987	"I Surrender All"	Best Soul Gospel Performance, Female
1987	"They Say" (with Sandi Patti)	Best Gospel Performance by a Duo or Group
