= Belly (film) =

1998 film directed by Hype Williams

- Theatrical release poster
- Directed by: Hype Williams
- Screenplay by: Hype Williams
- Story by: Anthony Bodden; Nas; Hype Williams
- Produced by: Ron Rotholz; Hype Williams; Robert Salerno; Larry Meistrich
- Starring: Nas; DMX; Taral Hicks; T-Boz; Method Man
- Narrated by: Nas; DMX
- Cinematography: Malik Sayeed
- Edited by: David Leonard
- Music by: Stephen Cullo
- Production company: Big Dog Films
- Distributed by: Artisan Entertainment
- Release date: November 4, 1998
- Running time: 96 minutes
- Country: United States
- Language: English
- Budget: $3 million
- Box office: $9.6 million

Belly is a 1998 American crime drama film written and directed by music video director Hype Williams, in his feature film directing debut. Filmed in New York City, the film stars rappers Nas and DMX in their film debut, alongside Taral Hicks, Method Man, T-Boz and an uncredited cameo from Sean Paul and Mr. Vegas.

The film received generally negative reviews from critics, who criticized the plot while praising the cinematography, and made $9.6 million on a $3 million budget. It remains the only film Williams ever directed. The film has since gained a cult following, namely for its visual presentation, cast and representation of hip-hop culture in the 1990s.

== Plot ==
In 1999, Tommy "Buns" Bundy and Sincere ("Sin"), two young street criminals from Queens, New York, murder five people during a violent nightclub robbery along with two associates, Mark and Black. After celebrating with the gang, Sincere returns home to his girlfriend Tionne and infant daughter Kenya. The following day, Buns asks Sincere to help him sell a new form of heroin. Sincere, who has begun having second thoughts about his life of crime, reluctantly agrees. Buns then visits Ox, a wealthy Jamaican drug lord, who agrees to obtain the heroin on the condition that Buns repay him with a very special favor at a later date.

In the basement of Mark's grandmother, the gang convenes to discuss the nascent drug operation; one of Buns' associates, Knowledge, will be involved in the operation. Knowledge tells Buns over the phone that Black had been talking about robbing Sincere to get his larger share of the loot from the nightclub. Enraged, Buns forces Black to strip naked in front of the others, wildly firing warning shots with a handgun into the floor.

The gang begins transporting heroin from Queens to Omaha, Nebraska, where they begin to overrun the local drug business. Big Head Rico, an Omaha dealer, informs police of their activities. The resulting raid at their stash-house ends with Mark's death and Knowledge's arrest. Knowledge realizes that Buns will not bail him out of jail, and calls Shameek, a.k.a. Father Sha, to both infiltrate Rico's gang and kill Buns. At a strip club, Shameek drinks shots that Rico spiked with hallucinatory powder and, under the influence, blows his own cover by telling Rico that he was sent by Knowledge to kill him. As Rico gets up and attempts to inform his henchmen, he is killed by Shameek as he tries to flee. Shameek is shot by the bartender and stumbles out of the club. He shoots at and evades the Omaha police.

Buns travels to Jamaica and repays Ox by killing Sosa, the son of a local drug lord. Back home, Buns' girlfriend Kisha is arrested by police and later bailed out by Tionne. Buns finds out about the raid and leaves town. Pelpa, a close friend of Sosa, finds out that Ox ordered his murder. He sends a hit squad to kill Ox in his home. Ox kills most of the hitmen before dying at the hands of a female assassin.

Sincere prepares to leave the drug trade and move his family to Africa, planning to leave on New Year's Day 2000. Meanwhile, while laying low in Atlanta, Buns instigates an argument between Wise and LaKid, two marijuana dealers, which ends with both men drawing their guns and LaKid shooting Wise. After being arrested over the shooting, Buns is coerced by a shadowy organization with unclear motives into assassinating a preacher, Rev. Saviour, during a sermon on New Year's Eve. Tionne finds herself confronted by Shameek and his henchmen, who had broken into her home in hopes of finding Sincere, but were unsuccessful. After attempting to interrogate Tionne for information on Sincere and Buns, they leave when she pulls a gun on them. When Sincere comes home, Tionne tells him what happened and insists that he get out of this dangerous life, which he agrees.

Buns calls Sincere and asks him to come meet him at a diner in Harlem. Comparing notes, they acknowledge that they have both changed. Buns has been positively influenced after infiltrating Rev. Savior's organization, and Sincere has similarly decided to change his life for the better, telling Buns of his plans to move his family to Africa. While Sincere is visiting a barbershop, Black shoots him in the leg as revenge for his earlier humiliation. Sincere and his barber kill Black and his accomplice in self-defense before fleeing the scene. On New Year's Eve, a conflicted Buns confronts Rev. Saviour before his scheduled speech and points his gun at him. Saviour convinces Buns not to go through with his mission, even though this will put his life at risk. A tearful Buns agrees, and the two men embrace.

Shameek breaks into one of Buns' homes where Kisha is living, in the hopes of finding Buns there. He interrogates and assaults Kisha, who manages to turn the tables and get a hold of Shameek's gun, shooting him in the face. In a voiceover, Sincere says he is now in Africa with his family, reflects on recent events and is happy to start a new life.

== Cast ==
- Nas as Sincere
- DMX as Tommy "Buns/Bundy" Brown
- Taral Hicks as Kisha
- Tionne "T-Boz" Watkins as Tionne
- Method Man as Shameek aka Father Sha
- Tyrin Turner as Big Head Rico
- Hassan Johnson as Mark
- Oliver "Power" Grant as Knowledge
- Louie Rankin as Lennox aka Ox
- Jay Black as Black
- Stanley Drayton as Wise
- James Parris as LaKid
- Benjamin Chavis as Reverend Saviour
- Sean Paul as Himself
- Mr. Vegas as Himself
- Lavita “Vita” Raynor as Kionna
- Crucial Conflict as themselves (cameo)
- Ghostface Killah as getaway driver (cameo)
- AZ as Born (Friend of Sincere)
- Frank Vincent as Roger
- Kurt Loder as Himself
- Paula Ouch as Chiquita
- William Burkeas as friend of Sincere

== Production ==
While filming Belly, the production was mired by frequent clashes between Williams and the producers, budget constraints, and cast members showing up drunk, high, or late. Much of the $3 million budget was used up on the film's opening scene, which was filmed in the former Tunnel nightclub in New York City. The film's costume designer, June Ambrose, recalled that Williams wanted the film's "shiny look" to "forecast what the hip-hop genre's gonna look like in the millennium." Williams revealed that Jay-Z was considered for the film's title role. The film's casting director was Winsome Sinclair.

== Release ==
When Belly was released in the United States in November 1998, some critics condemned it for its demeaning depictions of young Black or African American men. Furthermore, the Magic Johnson Theatres, a film theater chain then owned by the former basketball player Magic Johnson, banned the film from being shown on its screens due to "negative and violent depictions of African Americans."

=== Reception ===
On the review aggregator website Rotten Tomatoes, 23% of 22 critics' reviews are positive. Metacritic, which uses a weighted average, assigned the film a score of 36 out of 100, based on 20 critics, indicating "generally unfavorable" reviews.

Although it was generally praised for its highly stylized "noir-like" visual design and cinematography, it was criticized for what was seen as a weak plot. In Entertainment Weekly, Owen Gleiberman gave the film a negative review, criticizing Nas and DMX's performances as "nonacting" and finding it to weaken the contrast intended to exist between their characters. While praising Williams' framing, Gleiberman stated that he could "barely stage a coherent scene", accusing the director of glamorizing the violence as a "celebration of stone coldness as an end unto itself."

The film has since developed a cult following. Clayton Purdom of The A.V. Club described Belly as a "far from a perfect film, but it radiates talent, both from Williams and the musicians he captured at their commercial and artistic peak." Khris Davenport of Complex doubled down on the film's legacy and influence, writing that Williams "blazed a trail in black cinema that some filmmakers are only just now starting to understand and build upon."

=== Sequel ===
A sequel starring The Game, Belly 2: Millionaire Boyz Club, was filmed in 2005. It was released in 2008 through Lionsgate and Jimmy Henchman's Czar Entertainment. The film was originally titled Millionaire Boyz Club, but when Czar Entertainment partnered with Lionsgate for distribution, Lionsgate, as they owned the rights to Belly, added the Belly 2 prefix for marketing purposes. The movie features no returning cast members and has no narrative connection to the original film.

== Soundtrack ==
Year	Album	Peak chart positions		Certifications
Year	Album	U.S.	U.S. R&B	Certifications
1998	Belly: Released: November 3, 1998; Label: Def Jam	5	2	US: Gold

== See also ==
- List of hood films
