= Never Say Never (Deniece Williams song) =

Single by Deniece Williams

from the album Water Under the Bridge
- Released: 1987
- Studio: Do Not Erase Recording Studios, Fulham, London.
- Length: 3:42
- Label: Columbia
- Songwriters: Michael Jeffries, Michael Boyd, Deniece Williams
- Producer: Steve Levine

Deniece Williams singles chronology
"Healing" (1986)	"Never Say Never" (1987)	"I Confess" (1987)

Music video
- "Never Say Never" on YouTube

"Never Say Never" is a song written by Michael Jeffries, Michael Boyd and Deniece Williams, and recorded by Williams for her 1987 album Water Under the Bridge. Produced by Steve Levine, the song was released as a single in 1987 by Columbia Records, reaching number six on the US Billboard Hot Black Singles chart and No. 23 on the US Billboard Hot Dance Club Play chart.

== Critical reception ==
Andrew Hamilton of AllMusic found "Songs like 'Never Say Never' will keep every nerve on red alert."

== Charts ==
Chart (1987)	Peak position
US Hot Black Singles (Billboard)	6
US Billboard Hot Dance Club Play (Billboard)	23
