= Next Love =

Single by Deniece Williams

from the album Let's Hear It for the Boy
- Released: 1984
- Length: 7:05 (12" version)
- Label: Columbia 44 05043 (US)
- Songwriter(s): George Duke, Deniece Williams

Deniece Williams singles chronology
"Let's Hear It for the Boy" (1984)	"Next Love" (1984)	"Black Butterfly" (1984)

"Next Love" is a song recorded by American singer and songwriter Deniece Williams. It was released in 1984 for Columbia Records. The song was written and produced by Williams and the multi-instrumentalist George Duke.

The song comes from her 1984 album Let's Hear it for the Boy which also features the hit single of the same name.

"Next Love" peaked at number 17 on the Billboard Dance and number 22 on the R&B chart. It also entered the US Hot 100 chart, becoming a minor hit, peaking at number 81.

== Track listing ==
=== 1984 release ===
12" vinyl

- US: Columbia / 44 05043

A-side
No.	Title	Version	Length
1.	"Next Love"	Vocal	7:07

B-side
No.	Title	Version	Length
1.	"Next Love"	Instrumental	4:51

== Personnel ==
- Deniece Williams – lead vocals
- George Duke – Rhodes electric piano, Memorymoog
- Paul Jackson Jr. – guitars
- Freddie Washington – bass guitar
- Ricky Lawson – drums
- Sheila E. – percussion
- Hubert Laws – flute
- Roosevelt Christmas – backing vocals
- George Merrill – backing vocals
- Shannon Rubicam – backing vocals

== Chart performance ==
Chart (1984)	Peak position
US Billboard Hot 100	81
US Billboard Black Singles	22
US Billboard Hot Dance Music/Club Play	17
