= Wings of Eagles =

Wings of Eagles or On Wings of Eagles may refer to:

- On Wings of Eagles, a 1983 non-fiction thriller by Ken Follett
  - On Wings of Eagles (miniseries), a 1986 TV adaptation
  - On Wings of Eagles (film), a 2016 historical drama about Eric Liddell
- The Wings of Eagles, a 1957 American film
- Operation On Wings of Eagles, the exodus of Yemenite Jews to Israel 1949–1950
- "On Eagle's Wings", a Christian hymn
- Wings of Eagles (horse) (foaled 2014), a Thoroughbred racehorse
- Wings of Eagles (Elmira Corning Regional Airport), a museum

== See also ==
- On the Wings of an Eagle (disambiguation), including "Wings of an Eagle"
- Eagle Wing (disambiguation)
- Kanfei Nesharim (disambiguation)
