= Do What You Feel =

Single by Deniece Williams

from the album I'm So Proud
- Released: 1983
- Length: 3:52
- Label: Columbia
- Songwriter(s): Deniece Williams; George Duke
- Producer(s): George Duke

Deniece Williams singles chronology
"Waiting" (1982)	"Do What You Feel" (1983)	"I'm So Proud" (1983)

"Do What You Feel" is a song by American recording artist Deniece Williams released as a single in 1983 by Columbia Records. From her 1983 album I'm So Proud, "Do What You Feel" was produced by George Duke and composed by both Duke and Deniece Williams. The single reached number nine on the US Billboard Hot Black Singles chart.

== Charts ==
Chart (1983)	Peak position
US Hot Black Singles (Billboard)	9
