= Winsome Sinclair =

American casting director (1965–2024)

- Born: Winsome G. M. Sinclair; October 27, 1965; Jamaica
- Died: August 12, 2024 (aged 58); Long Island, New York, U.S.
- Education: Florida A&M University
- Occupations: Casting director; film producer
- Children: Two

Winsome G.M. Sinclair (October 27, 1965 – August 12, 2024) was a Jamaican-born American casting director and film producer. She was the founder and chairwoman of Winsome Sinclair and Associates, a global casting agency based out of Atlanta. Sinclair was a frequent collaborator with famed directors such as Spike Lee, John Singleton, Steven Spielberg, Lee Daniels, and the Hughes Brothers.

== Biography ==
Born in Jamaica and raised in New York, Sinclair went to Uniondale High School and graduated from Florida A&M University. Her first casting director credit came in 1998 with Belly, starring Nas and DMX.

In 2010, she was the Star Project Mentor at the 2010 American Black Film Festival. She also produced movies, such as co-producing the 2017 Sam Pollard film Maynard, a bio-pic about Atlanta's first Black mayor, Maynard Jackson. The film was shown at film festivals such as Doc NYC and the Full Frame Documentary Film Festival. Through her casting agency, she also took part in the launching of Kenneth Andam's book Scarlet Minor Chronicles. She was a panelist at the 2018 For the academy's Careers in Film Summit in Atlanta, hosted by the African-American Film Critics Association.

Sinclair had two adoptive sons. She died in hospice care due to colon cancer on August 12, 2024, at the age of 58.

== Filmography ==
=== Casting director ===
==== Film ====
| Year | Title | Notes | Ref. |
|---|---|---|---|
| 2023 | Seeking: Mapping Our Gullah Geechee Story | | |
| 2017 | Maynard | | |
| 2017 | All Eyez on Me | | |
| 2012 | Red Hook Summer | | |
| 2006 | Black Snake Moan | | |
| 2006 | My Brother | | |
| 2002 | G | | |
| 2001 | 30 Years to Life | | |
| 1998 | Belly | | |

==== 8Music videos ====
| Year | Title | Notes | Ref. |
|---|---|---|---|
| 2016 | Us or Else | | |
| 2009 | Before I Self Destruct | | |

=== Producer ===
| Year | Title | Notes | Ref. |
|---|---|---|---|
| 2017 | Maynard | Co-producer | |
