= I've Got the Next Dance =

Single by Deniece Williams

from the album When Love Comes Calling
- B-side: "When Love Comes Calling"
- Released: April 1979
- Recorded: 1979
- Genre: Post-disco; R&B; soul
- Length: 3:42
- Label: ARC/Columbia
- Songwriters: Cheyenne Fowler, Keg Johnson, June Deniece Williams
- Producer: David Foster

"I've Got the Next Dance" is a song by Deniece Williams issued as a single in April 1979 on ARC/Columbia Records. The song reached No. 1 on the Billboard Dance Club Play chart and No. 26 on the Billboard Hot Soul Songs chart.

== Overview ==
"I've Got the Next Dance" was composed by Cheyenne Fowler, Keg Johnson and June Deniece Williams, although there were three other non-credited composers, which included Anthony Johnson, Michael Nance, and Ed Mann. The song was also produced by David Foster and came off Williams' 1979 album When Love Comes Calling.

== Critical reception ==
Connie Johnson of the Los Angeles Times found that "Williams rocks assertively in an arrangement that would have overwhelmed a lesser singer." Andy Kellman of AllMusic called I've Got the Next Dance "an effervescent slice of galloping disco-pop".
