= Baby, Baby My Love's All for You =

Single by Deniece Williams

from the album Song Bird
- B-side: "Be Good To Me"
- Released: October 1977
- Genre: Soul, R&B
- Length: 3:51
- Label: Columbia
- Songwriters: Verdine White, Robert Wright
- Producer: Maurice White

Deniece Williams singles chronology
"That's What Friends Are For" (1977)	"Baby, Baby My Love's All for You" (1977)

"Baby, Baby My Love's All for You" is a song by Deniece Williams, released as a single in October 1977 by Columbia Records. The song reached No. 13 on the US Billboard Hot Soul Songs chart, No. 5 on the UK Blues & Soul Top British Soul Singles chart and No. 32 on the UK Pop Singles chart.

== Overview ==
"Baby, Baby My Love's All for You" was produced by Maurice White and composed by Verdine White with Robert Wright. The song also appeared on Williams's 1977 album Song Bird.

== Charts ==
Year	Chart	Position
1977	UK Pop Singles	32
1978	US Billboard Hot Soul Songs	13
1978	UK Record Mirror UK Soul Songs	4
1978	UK Blues & Soul Top British Soul Songs	5
