= I Can't Wait (Deniece Williams song) =

Single by Deniece Williams

from the album As Good As It Gets
- Released: 1988
- Studio: Le Gonks West Studio, Hollywood, California
- Length: 4:15
- Label: Columbia
- Songwriter: Skylark
- Producer: George Duke

Music video
- "I Can't Wait" on YouTube

"I Can't Wait" is a song recorded by Deniece Williams for her 1988 album As Good As It Gets. Produced by George Duke, the song was released as a single in 1988 by Columbia Records, reaching number 8 on the US Billboard Hot Black Singles chart.

== Critical reception ==
Hugh Wyatt of the New York Daily News exclaimed I Can't Wait, doesn't "reflect the pedestrian soap-opera fare of some of her previous dance-oriented tunes. Her level of maturity and spirit seems to elevate even the most menial of songs, particularly those in the disco idiom." Mike Joyce of The Washington Post called the song "a vibrant, catchy pop tune".

== Charts ==
Chart (1988)	Peak position
US Billboard Hot 100	66
US Hot Black Singles (Billboard)	8
