= Water Under the Bridge (album) =

Studio album by Deniece Williams
- Released: May 1, 1987
- Studio: Do Not Erase Recording Studios (Fulham, London, England)
- Genre: R&B, soul
- Length: 43:15
- Label: Columbia
- Producer: Steve Levine

Deniece Williams chronology
Hot on the Trail (1982)	Water Under the Bridge (1987)	As Good as it Gets (1988)

Singles from Water Under The Bridge
- 1. "Never Say Never" Released: 1987; 2. "I Confess" Released: 1987

Water Under the Bridge is an album by American singer Deniece Williams, released in 1987 on Columbia Records. The album reached No. 39 on the Billboard Top Soul Albums chart.

== Critical reception ==
Professional ratings
Review scores
Source	Rating
AllMusic	4/5 stars

Frann Bart of The San Diego Union-Tribune declared that "she's switched gears back to an urbanized pop sound that is almost completely synthesized, but contains enough good material to challenge her. Lucky the producer is Steve Levine, whose musical sensibilites lean toward the understated, tasteful, arrangement. He manages an album that sounds more human than many minus all the electronics. And most important, Williams is free to interpret in her expressive soprano-with-soul without being buried by the music."

Andrew Hamilton of AllMusic wrote, "Deniece Williams' incredible high-octane soprano soars over ten tracks".

== Singles ==
"Never Say Never" reached No. 6 on the Billboard Hot Black Singles chart and No. 23 on the Billboard Hot Dance Club Play chart. Another single, I Confess reached No. 24 on the Billboard Hot Black Singles chart.

== Track listing ==
No.	Title	Writer(s)	Length
1.	"I Confess"	Diane Warren	3:56
2.	"Never Say Never"	Deniece Williams, Michael Boyd, Michael Jeffries	4:56
3.	"Water Under the Bridge"	Glen Ballard, Marti Sharron	4:31
4.	"Love Finds You"	Deniece Williams, George Merrill, Shannon Rubicam	4:00
5.	"Not by Chance"	Brad Westering, Deniece Williams, George Duke	4:38
6.	"One Less Lonely Heart"	David Paul Bryant, Diane Warren	4:14
7.	"I Believe in You"	Dave Raynor, Kenny Lamar	4:28
8.	"Someone for Someone"	Seth Swirsky, Stephen Broughton Lunt	3:47
9.	"Baby This Is Love"	Mark Williamson	3:54
10.	"Don't Blame It On My Heart"	Deniece Williams, Jay Gruska	4:48

== Personnel ==
- Deniece Williams – vocals, backing vocals
- Julian Stewart Lindsay – keyboards, Hammond organ, sequencer programming
- George Duke – Synclavier
- Steve Levine – Fairlight programming
- Roy Hay – electric guitars, backing vocals
- Danny McIntosh – electric guitars, SynthAxe
- Morris Michael – electric guitars [& stepp]
- Felix Kirsh – bass guitar, Moog Bass
- Graham Broad – drums, percussion
- Steve Grainger – saxophones
- Terry Bailey – trumpets
- Stuart Gordon – cello, viola, violin
- Colin Campsie – backing vocals
- Lance Ellington – backing vocals
- Derek Green – backing vocals
- Jermaine Stewart – backing vocals
- June Westering – backing vocals
- Mark Williamson – backing vocals

Production

- Brad Westering – executive producer
- Steve Levine – producer
- Greg Laney – engineer
- Robert Hill – assistant engineer
- Tim Young – digital mastering at CBS Studios (London, UK)
- Tony Lane – art direction
- Nancy Donald – art direction
- Dominick – photography
- Westwind Management – management
