= I Confess (Deniece Williams song) =

Single by Deniece Williams

from the album Water Under the Bridge
- B-side: "I Confess (Instrumental)"
- Released: 1987
- Studio: Do Not Erase Recording Studios, Fulham, London.
- Length: 3:50
- Label: Columbia
- Songwriter(s): Diane Warren
- Producer(s): Steve Levine

"I Confess" is a song written by Diane Warren and recorded by Deniece Williams for her 1987 album Water Under the Bridge. Produced by Steve Levine, the song was released as a single in 1987 by Columbia Records, reaching number 24 on the US Billboard Hot Black Singles chart.

== Charts ==
Chart (1987)	Peak position
US Hot Black Singles (Billboard)	24
