= This Is My Song (Deniece Williams album) =

Studio album by Deniece Williams
- Released: 10 March 1998
- Recorded: 1997–1998
- Genres: Soul, urban contemporary gospel, contemporary R&B
- Label: Harmony
- Producers: Deniece Williams, Raina Bundy, Raymel Menefee, Loris Holland

Deniece Williams chronology
Love Solves It All (1996)	This Is My Song (1998)	Love Niecy Style (2007)

Professional ratings
Review scores
Source	Rating
AllMusic	2.5/5 stars
Cross Rhythms	9/10 stars

This Is My Song is a studio album by American soul singer, Deniece Williams released in 1998 by Harmony Records. The album rose to no. 14 on the Billboard Top Gospel Albums chart. This Is My Song also won a Grammy for Best Contemporary Pop Gospel Album.

== Track listing ==
No.	Title	Writer(s)	Length
1.	"Blessed Assurance"	Fanny J. Crosby, Jos Knapp, Deniece Williams	4:42
2.	"Lover of My Soul"	Williams, Raymel Menefee	5:37
3.	"Standing"	Loris Holland, Williams	5:12
4.	"Nothing But the Blood"	Robert Lowery, Williams	4:55
5.	"No, Never Alone"	Williams, Menefee	5:31
6.	"Just As I Am" (featuring Victor Cruz)	Charlotte Elliot, William Bradbury, Holland, Williams	4:41
7.	"Prodigal Sons and Daughters"	Thomas Chisholm, William Runyan, Williams	4:00
8.	"It Is Well"	H.G. Spafford, P.P. Bliss, Williams	5:02
9.	"I Love Him Above All Things"	Frank Rough, J.E. Sturgis, Raina Bundy, Williams	5:24
10.	"I Come to the Garden Alone"	C. Austin Miles, Williams	4:52

== Album credits ==
- Raymel Menefee – producer
- Raina Bundy – executive producer
- Gerard Smerek – sound engineer
- David Bett – art direction
- Tom Coyne – engineer
- Mike Viola – assistant engineer
- Cathie Arquilla – stylist
- Andrew Eccles – photography
- Elaine Good – make-up, hair stylist

Music

- Ray Chew – strings
- Wayne Cobham – horns
- Larry Ferguson – guitar
- Bob Gallo – guitar
- Loris Holland – rhythm
- Steve Moss – percussion

== Chart history ==
Chart (1998)	Peak position
U.S. Billboard Gospel	14
