= Eagles Wing Corporation =

American aircraft manufacturer

- Company type: Privately held company
- Industry: Aerospace
- Founded: 1999
- Defunct: 2005
- Fate: Out of business
- Headquarters: United States
- Products: Powered parachutes

Eagles Wing Corporation (sometimes styled as Eagles-Wing, Corp.) was an American aircraft manufacturer based in Normandy, Tennessee and later Morrison, Tennessee. The company specialized in the design and manufacture of powered parachutes in the form of ready-to-fly aircraft for the US FAR 103 Ultralight Vehicles rules.

The company seems to have been founded about 1999 and gone out of business in 2005.

The company marketed one aircraft model, the single-seat Eagles Wing Scout, although a two-seat model was under development since 2003. The two-seat model appears to have never been produced, except one prototype.

== Aircraft ==
Summary of aircraft built by Eagles Wing Corporation
Model name	First flight	Number built	Type
Eagles Wing Scout	1999		Single-seat powered parachute
