= My Melody (Deniece Williams album) =

Studio album by Deniece Williams
- Released: March 13, 1981
- Recorded: 1980–1981
- Studios: Sigma, Philadelphia, Pennsylvania
- Genres: R&B; soul
- Length: 39:13
- Label: ARC/Columbia
- Producers: Thom Bell; Deniece Williams

Deniece Williams chronology
When Love Comes Calling (1979)	My Melody (1981)	Niecy (1982)

Singles from My Melody
- 1. "Silly" Released: August 1981; 2. "What Two Can Do"

My Melody is the fifth studio album by American singer Deniece Williams, released in March 1981 by ARC/Columbia Records. The album reached No. 13 on the Billboard Top Soul LPs chart. My Melody was certified Gold in the US by the RIAA.

== Overview ==
"Silly" and "What Two Can Do" were released as singles with each peaking at No. 11 and No. 17, respectively, on the Billboard R&B singles chart.

== Critical reception ==
Professional ratings
Review scores
Source	Rating
AllMusic	4.5/5 stars
The Philadelphia Inquirer	4/5 stars
The Rolling Stone Album Guide	4/5 stars

Andrew Hamilton of AllMusic declared: "Deniece's heavenly soprano is as impressive as ever under the guidance of producer Thom Bell. The sweet Philly sound architect keeps Williams' expressive, high-range vocals under wraps, transforming her into a bel canto singer on eight delightful selections." The Philadelphia Inquirer opined that "although her roots are R&B, Miss Williams transcends easy categorisation with this collection of material and her versatile presentation." Stephen Holden of The New York Times found that "My Melody, Miss Williams's fourth solo album, is an inspired collaboration with Thom Bell, the Philadelphia songwriter and producer whose hits with the Stylistics and the Spinners in the early 70's epitomized pop-soul elegance." Phyl Garland of Stereo Review wrote that "several of the songs have a comfortable, nestling down quality that makes the album, if not one of her best, at least easy to enjoy."

== Track listing ==
Side one
No.	Title	Writer(s)	Length
1.	"My Melody"	Thom Bell, Deniece Williams	4:12
2.	"It's Your Conscience"	Bell, Williams	4:53
3.	"Silly"	Fritz Baskett, Clarence McDonald, Williams	5:56
4.	"Strangers"	Baskett, McDonald, Williams	6:26

Side two
No.	Title	Writer(s)	Length
1.	"What Two Can Do"	Bell, Williams	3:50
2.	"You're All That Matters"	Bell, Preston Glass, Alan Glass, Williams	5:17
3.	"Suspicious"	Bell, Williams	4:14
4.	"Sweet Surrender"	Bell, Williams	4:21

== Charts ==
=== Weekly charts ===
Chart (1981)	Peak position
US Billboard 200	74
US Top R&B/Hip-Hop Albums (Billboard)	13

=== Year-end charts ===
Chart (1981)	Position
US Billboard 200	86
US Top R&B/Hip-Hop Albums (Billboard)	16

Singles – Billboard
Year	Single	Chart	Position	
1981	"It's Your Conscience"	Soul Singles	45	US
1981	"Silly"	Billboard Hot 100	53	US
1981	"Silly"	Soul Singles	11	US
1981	"What Two Can Do"	Soul Singles	17	US

== Personnel ==
Musicians

- Deniece Williams – lead vocals
- Thom Bell – keyboards, backing vocals, arrangements and conductor
- George Merrill – keyboards, backing vocals
- Bobby Eli – guitar
- Bill Neale – guitar
- Bob Babbitt – bass guitar
- Charles Collins – drums
- Ed Shea – percussion
- Larry Washington – percussion
- Don Renaldo – strings, horns
- Carl Helm – backing vocals

Production

- Producers – Thom Bell and Deniece Williams
- Production Coordination – JoDee Omar and Bo Ryan
- Rhythm Tracks and Vocals engineered by Jim Gallagher and Don Murray.
- Strings and Horns engineered by Jim Gallagher and Arthur Stoppe.
- Mixed by Don Murray at Monterey Sound Studios (Glendale, CA).
- Mastered by Mike Reese at The Mastering Lab (Los Angeles, CA).
- Art Direction – Desmond Strobel
- Photography – Charles William Bush
- Fashions – Ann Taylor
