= Song Bird (Deniece Williams album) =

Studio album by Deniece Williams
- Released: October 28, 1977
- Recorded: April–July 1977
- Studios: Wally Heider, Los Angeles, CA; Sunset Sound; Hollywood Sound, Hollywood, CA; The Burbank Studios, Burbank, CA
- Genres: R&B, soul, disco
- Length: 37:25
- Label: Columbia
- Producer: Maurice White

Deniece Williams chronology
This Is Niecy (1976)	Song Bird (1977)	That's What Friends Are For (1978)

Singles from Song Bird
- 1. "Baby, Baby My Love's All for You" Released: October 1977

Song Bird is the second studio album by American singer Deniece Williams. It was produced by Maurice White and released on October 28, 1977, by Columbia Records. The album peaked at No. 23 on the US Billboard Top Soul Albums chart and No. 5 on the UK Blues & Soul Top British Soul Albums chart.

== Critical reception ==
Professional ratings
Review scores
Source	Rating
AllMusic	3.5/5 stars
Cashbox	(favourable)
Daily Express	4/5
Variety	(favourable)

With a four out of five rating, Simon Gage of Daily Express described Song Bird as being "filled with gorgeous songs that showcase her four-octave range to full effect." John Rockwell of The New York Times stated: "Deniece Williams's “Song Bird” is a most appealing album for anyone who likes varied, skillful and sophisticated singing in the black pop area." He also added "One can't be more stylistically precise than that because it is a characteristic of Maurice White's production and Miss Williams's virtuousically diverse singing that her disk ambles all over the stylistic map. But instead of sounding diffuse, it sounds refreshingly varied." Phyl Garland of Stereo Review commented: "Here she is fitted out with material that is even better than that on her fine first album. Producer Maurice White poured all of the proper stuff into this one; the arrangements are imaginative, and several name musicians supply smooth, unobtrusive instrumental backing. Ms. Williams is also a songwriter of notable talent, for she helped write some of the best tunes here."

== Singles ==
"Baby, Baby My Love's All for You" rose to No. 13 upon the US Billboard Hot R&B Songs and No. 32 on the UK Pop singles chart.

== Covers ==
Williams covered Ferlin Husky's "Time" on the album.

== Appearances in other media ==
Williams performed "God Is Amazing" at the 1984 Grammy Awards.

== Track listing ==
Side one
No.	Title	Writer(s)	Length
1.	"Time"	Al McKay, Deniece Williams, Fred White, Jerry Peters, Marlo Henderson, Maurice White, Verdine White	3:51
2.	"The Boy I Left Behind"	Eric Eisner	3:37
3.	"We Have Love for You"	Al Johnson	3:36
4.	"God Is Amazing"	Deniece Williams	4:00

Side two
No.	Title	Writer(s)	Length
5.	"Baby, Baby My Love's All for You"	Verdine White, Robert Wright	4:09
6.	"Season"	Clarence McDonald, Fritz Baskett	3:38
7.	"Be Good to Me"	Clarence McDonald, Deniece Williams, Fritz Baskett	2:56
8.	"The Paper"	Deniece Williams	7:48

== Personnel ==
- Deniece Williams – lead vocals, backing vocals
- Sidney Barnes – backing vocals
- Jerry Peters – pianos
- Larry Dunn – synthesizers
- Charles Fearing – guitars
- Marlo Henderson – guitars
- Al McKay – guitars
- John Rowin Jr. – guitars
- Nathan Watts – bass
- Verdine White – bass
- David Garibaldi – drums
- Fred White – drums
- Maurice White – drums, backing vocals
- Paulinho da Costa – percussion
- Victor Feldman – vibraphone
- Azar Lawrence – saxophones
- Don Myrick – saxophones, sax solo (6, 8)
- George Patterson – saxophones
- Andrew Woolfolk – saxophones
- George Bohanon – trombone
- Charles Loper – trombone
- Louis Satterfield – trombone
- Oscar Brashear – trumpet
- Chuck Findley – trumpet
- Michael Harris – trumpet, trumpet solo (8)
- Steve Madaio – trumpet
- Tom Tom 84 (Tom Washington) – string and horn arrangements

Production

- Producer – Maurice White
- Co-Producer – Jerry Peters
- Engineer – Warren Dewey
- Assistant Engineer – Jack Rouben
- Design – Nancy Donald
- Photography – Kenneth McGowan

== Charts ==
Album
Year	Chart	Position
1977	US Billboard Top R&B Albums	23
1977	US Billboard 200	66
1978	UK Blues & Soul Top British Soul Albums	5
