= This Is Niecy =

Studio album by Deniece Williams
- Released: August 13, 1976
- Recorded: June – August 1976
- Studios: Wally Heider Studios; Westlake Audio; (Los Angeles, CA); Davlen Sound Studios; (North Hollywood, CA); Kendun Recorders; (Burbank, CA)
- Genres: R&B, soul, quiet storm
- Length: 34:27
- Label: Columbia
- Producers: Maurice White, Charles Stepney

Deniece Williams chronology
This Is Niecy (1976)	Song Bird (1977)

Singles from This Is Niecy
- 1. "Free" Released: October 26, 1976; 2. "It's Important to Me" Released: June 1977

This Is Niecy is the debut album of American R&B singer Deniece Williams released on August 13, 1976, by Columbia Records. The album reached No. 3 on the Billboard Top Soul Albums chart and No. 33 on the Billboard 200. The album has been certified Gold in the US by the RIAA and Silver in the UK by the BPI.

== Background ==
Williams spent previously spending time singing background vocals for Stevie Wonder, as part of "Wonderlove.". She had sent demo tapes to Maurice White. She wanted said songs to be recorded by Earth Wind & Fire. But upon hearing her "bell-like and yet strong" voice, White was wowed, and insisted she record them herself. But having witnessed Wonder, Williams didn't desire the responsibility of being the main artist. Her ambition was to write songs. White however continued pushing. Williams eventually agreed. She left Wonder to sign a deal with Columbia Records and Kalimba Productions. White and Charles Stepney went on to produce the album. Williams wrote or co-wrote every song.

== Re-releases ==
The album was remastered and reissued with bonus tracks in 2013 by Big Break Records.

== Critical reception ==
Professional ratings
Review scores
Source	Rating
AllMusic	4.5/5 stars
Record Mirror	4/5 stars
Variety	(favourable)

Andy Kellman of AllMusic declared, "This Is Niecy is a great complement to Earth, Wind & Fire's Spirit, released the same year -- not only for its overlapping personnel, but also for its greatness." David O' Donnell of the BBC noted that "what really shines from the album is Williams' distinctive soprano voice, range and acrobatic vocal ability which confirms her as one of the greatest R&B and soul singers of her time." Sheila Prophet of Record Mirror called This Is Niecy "a great first album". Prophet added, "Niecy's voice combines the silkiness of Diana Ross with the exuberance of Linda Lewis".

== Singles ==
Singles from the album included "Free" which reached No. 1 on the UK Singles Chart, No. 2 on the US Billboard Hot Soul Songs chart and No. 25 on the Billboard Hot 100.

== Track listing ==
Side one
No.	Title	Writer(s)	Length
1.	"It's Important to Me"	Deniece Williams, Clarence McDonald, Fritz Baskett	4:21
2.	"That's What Friends Are For"	Deniece Williams, Clarence McDonald, Fritz Baskett, Lani Groves	4:27
3.	"How'd I Know That Love Would Slip Away"	Deniece Williams, Clarence McDonald, Lani Groves	3:49
4.	"Cause You Love Me, Baby"	Deniece Williams	4:08

Side two
No.	Title	Writer(s)	Length
5.	"Free"	Deniece Williams, Hank Redd, Nathan Watts, Susaye Greene	5:57
6.	"Watching Over"	Deniece Williams, Maurice White, Freddie White, Verdine White, Jerry Peters, Al McKay	3:53
7.	"If You Don't Believe"	Deniece Williams, Clarence McDonald, Fritz Baskett	7:54

2012 remastered reissue bonus tracks
No.	Title	Length
8.	"Free" (Short Single Version)	2:52
9.	"That's What Friends Are For" (Single Version)	3:47
10.	"Free" (Long Single Version)	3:27

== Personnel ==
- Deniece Williams – lead and backing vocals
- Maurice White – drums, backing vocals
- Freddie White – drums, percussion
- Verdine White – bass
- Al McKay – guitar
- Jerry Peters – acoustic piano, electric piano
- George Bohanon, Randy Aldcroft – trombone
- Gale Robinson, Sidney Muldrow – French horn
- Oscar Brashear, Steve Madaio – trumpet
- Ernie Watts, Plas Johnson, Ray Pizzi, Terry Harrington – woodwinds
- Sidney Barnes – backing vocals

Production

- Producers – Charles Stepney and Maurice White
- Engineer – George Massenburg
- Assistant Engineers – Steve Hodge and Dean Rod
- Mastered by Mike Reese at The Mastering Lab (Los Angeles, CA).
- Design – Ron Coro and Norm Ung
- Photography – Ethan Russell and Jimmy Shea

== Charts ==
=== Weekly charts ===
Chart (1977)	Peak position
UK Albums (Official Charts)	26
US Billboard 200	33
US Top R&B/Hip-Hop Albums (Billboard)	3

=== Year-end charts ===
Chart (1977)	Position
US Billboard 200	55
US Top R&B/Hip-Hop Albums (Billboard)	19

=== Singles ===
Year	Single	Chart positions			
Year	Single	US Pop	US R&B	US Dance	UK Pop Singles
1976	"It's Important to Me"	—	—	13	—
1977	"Free"	25	2	1	1
1977	"Cause You Love Me, Baby"	—	74	—	—
1977	"That's What Friends Are For"	—	65	—	8
