= I'm So Proud =

Studio album by Deniece Williams
- Released: 1983
- Studios: The Complex and Lion Share (Los Angeles, California); LeGonks West (West Hollywood, California); Sunset Sound (Hollywood, California); Monterey Sound (Glendale, California)
- Genres: R&B, soul
- Length: 39:15
- Label: Columbia
- Producers: George Duke; Bill Neale; Deniece Williams

Deniece Williams chronology
Niecy (1982)	I'm So Proud (1983)	Let's Hear It for the Boy (1984)

Singles from I'm So Proud
- 1. "Do What You Feel" Released: 1983

I'm So Proud is the sixth studio album by American singer Deniece Williams, released in 1983 by Columbia Records. The album reached No. 10 on the Billboard Top Soul Albums chart.

== Singles ==
"Do What You Feel" reached No. 9 on the Billboard Hot Soul Singles chart. A cover of Curtis Mayfield's "I'm So Proud" reached No. 28 on the same chart.

== Critical reception ==
Professional ratings
Review scores
Source	Rating
AllMusic	3/5 stars
The Rolling Stone Album Guide	3/5 stars
The Village Voice	B

Connie Johnson of the Los Angeles Times called I'm So Proud, "Williams' most consistently fine work in ages... The album works due to fresh-sounding, quality material. This is black pop at its most enterprising." Robert Christgau of The Village Voice found that "Williams has progressed, as they say, from Thom Bell's pop romanticism to George Duke's cosmic idealism." Phyl Garland of Stereo Review professed, "I'm So Proud shows why Deniece Williams has every right to be. It's simply superb."

== Accolades ==
I'm So Proud was Grammy nominated in the category of Best Female R&B Vocal Performance.

== Track listing ==
No.	Title	Writer(s)	Length
1.	"Do What You Feel"	Deniece Williams, George Duke	4:24
2.	"I'm So Proud"	Curtis Mayfield	3:55
3.	"So Deep in Love" (Duet with Johnny Mathis)	Jeff Barry, Bruce Roberts	4:22
4.	"I'm Glad It's You"	Deniece Williams	3:28
5.	"Heaven in Your Eyes"	Raymond Jones	4:54
6.	"They Say" (Featuring Philip Bailey)	Terri McFaddin, Skip Scarborough	7:10
7.	"Love, Peace and Unity"	Scott Sigman	5:36
8.	"It's Okay"	Deniece Williams, George Duke	5:26

== Personnel ==
- Deniece WillIams – lead vocals, backing vocals (6, 7)
- George Duke – electric piano (1, 4, 5, 8), synthesizers (1, 4, 5, 8), acoustic piano (5)
- Jerry Peters – keyboards (2, 6)
- George Merrill – synthesizers (2, 3, 6), backing vocals (2, 6)
- Brian Mann – keyboards (3)
- Tyrone Downie – keyboards (7)
- Michael Sembello – guitars (1, 5, 8)
- Jeff Baxter – guitars (2, 3, 6)
- Paul Jackson Jr. – guitars (2, 3, 6)
- Ronald Butler – guitars (7)
- Louis Johnson – bass (1, 4, 5, 8)
- Freddie Washington – bass (2, 3, 6)
- John "Shaun" Solomon – bass (7)
- Ricky Lawson – drums (1, 4, 5, 8)
- Denny Seiwell – drums (2, 3, 6), percussion (3)
- Errol Corwin – drums (7)
- Bob Zimmitti – percussion (2, 6)
- Paulinho da Costa – percussion (5, 8)
- Lenny Castro – percussion (6)
- Kenny Florendo – percussion (7)
- Larry McDonald – percussion (7)
- Ernie Watts – tenor saxophone (1)
- Lee Oskar – harmonica (2)
- Bill Neale – arrangements and conductor (2, 3, 6), backing vocals (2)
- Philip Bailey – backing vocals (2, 6)
- Carl Carwell – backing vocals (2, 6)
- Oren Waters – backing vocals (2, 6)
- Johnny Mathis – lead vocals (3)

Production

- Larkin Arnold – executive producer
- George Duke – producer (1, 4, 5, 8)
- Bill Neale – producer (2, 3, 6)
- Deniece WillIams – producer (2, 3, 6, 7)
- Peter Chaiken – engineer (1, 4, 5, 8)
- Tommy Vicari – recording (1, 4, 5, 8), mixing (1, 4, 5, 8)
- Don Murray – engineer (2, 3, 6), mixing (2, 3, 6)
- Kenny Florendo – engineer (7)
- Wally Traugott – mastering at Allen Zentz Mastering (San Clemente, California)
- Nancy Donald – design
- Phillip Dixon – photography
