= Let's Hear It for the Boy (album) =

Studio album by Deniece Williams
- Released: 1984
- Recorded: 1983–1984
- Studios: The Complex and Soundcastle (Los Angeles, California); LeGonks West (West Hollywood, California)
- Genres: R&B, soul, funk, dance, post-disco
- Length: 40:53
- Labels: Columbia, CBS
- Producers: Deniece Williams; George Duke

Deniece Williams chronology
I'm So Proud (1983)	Let's Hear It for the Boy (1984)	So Glad I Know (1986)

Singles from Let's Hear It for the Boy
- 1. "Let's Hear It for the Boy" Released: February 1984; 2. "Next Love" Released: 1984; 3. "Black Butterfly" Released: 1984

Let's Hear It for the Boy is the seventh solo studio album (and eighth overall) by American recording artist Deniece Williams, released in 1984 by Columbia Records. The album reached No. 26 on the US Billboard 200 and No. 10 on the US Billboard Top R&B Albums charts.

== Production ==
Deniece Williams produced six of the album's tracks while George Duke produced the remaining four. The production of the album was completed in early May 1984 and the album was released a few weeks later.

== Singles ==
The album's title track reached No. 1 in the US on the Billboard Hot 100, Hot Soul Singles, and Dance Club Play charts. On the UK Pop Singles chart, it peaked at No. 2. The song was written for the 1984 feature film Footloose and appears on its soundtrack. It was certified Platinum by the RIAA.

Another song released as a single was, "Next Love", which peaked at No. 17 on the Billboard Hot Dance Club Play chart.

== Critical reception ==
Professional ratings
Review scores
Source	Rating
The Baltimore Sun	4/5 stars
New York Daily News	unrated

Connie Johnson of the Los Angeles Times favourably found, "There's a lightness to Williams' music. It suggests a spring day with no clouds in the sky, and puppy love-as opposed to 'messy' adult passion...A former protege of Stevie Wonder and Maurice White, she uses traces of their sound in her music, coupled with her own lithe gracefulness...Williams' sound may be light, but it always has a proficient and artful base..This is the kind of music that amounts to little more than stylish fluff. But it works." Chris Albertson of Stereo Review noted, "Williams not only has a fine voice, she also knows exactly how to use it-when to let it loose and when not to. There is no screaming here, just fine vocalizing and first-rate arrangements". Steve Morse of The Boston Globe praised the album, saying, "She's been known for middle-of-the-road ballads, but she breaks out here with her first uptempo record, setting a crisp pace through '80s disco funk and bedazzling electronics."

Williams was later bestowed with a Soul Train Award nomination for Artist of the Year.

== Track listing ==
Side one
No.	Title	Writer(s)	Producer(s)	Length
1.	"Let's Hear It for the Boy"	Dean Pitchford; Tom Snow	George Duke	4:20
2.	"I Want You"	Deniece Williams; Peter Couch	Williams	2:50
3.	"Picking Up the Pieces"	Williams; Couch	Williams	4:40
4.	"Black Butterfly"	Barry Mann; Cynthia Weil	Duke	4:25
5.	"Next Love"	Williams; Duke	Duke	4:23

Side two
No.	Title	Writer(s)	Producer(s)	Length
1.	"Haunting Me"	Williams; George Merrill; Shannon Rubicam	Duke	4:57
2.	"Don't Tell Me We Have Nothing"	Merrill; Rubicam	Williams	4:00
3.	"Blind Dating"	Williams; Michele Val Jean; Robert Brookins	Williams	3:39
4.	"Wrapped Up"	Andrew Barrett; George McMahon	Williams	3:39
5.	"Whiter Than Snow"	Traditional	Williams	3:44

== Personnel ==
Vocals

- Deniece Williams – lead vocals, backing vocals (1, 3, 6–10)
- George Merrill – backing vocals (1, 3, 5–9)
- Shannon Rubicam – backing vocals (1, 3, 5–9)
- Oren Waters – backing vocals (3, 9)
- Roosevelt Christmas III – backing vocals (5, 6)

Musicians

- George Duke – Memorymoog (1, 5), Prophet-5 (1, 4), Moog bass (1), LinnDrum programming (1, 6), keyboards (2), Rhodes electric piano (5), synthesizers (6), vocoder (6), special effects (6)
- Russell Ferrante – acoustic piano (3, 4, 8, 9), Rhodes electric piano (4)
- Kevin Grady – synthesizers (3, 8, 9)
- Leon Pendarvis – synthesizers (3, 8, 9)
- George Merrill – Roland Jupiter 8 (6), LinnDrum programming (6)
- Jerry Peters – organ (10)
- Paul Jackson Jr. – guitars (1, 3, 5, 7–9)
- Jeff Baxter – guitars (3, 7–9)
- Michael Sembello – guitars (4, 6)
- Nathan East – bass (3, 4, 7–9)
- Freddie Washington – bass (5)
- Ricky Lawson – drums (3–5, 7, 8)
- Ricky Nelson – drums (9)
- Paulinho da Costa – percussion (1, 3)
- Sheila E. – percussion (5)
- John Robinson – tom toms (6)
- Ronnie Laws – tenor saxophone (2)
- Richard Elliot – lyricon (4)
- Hubert Laws – flute (5)

Music arrangements

- Deniece Williams – arrangements (2)
- George Del Barrio – string arrangements (2)
- Leon Pendarvis – arrangements (3, 7–9)
- George Merrill – arrangements (6)
- Jerry Peters – arrangements (10)

Production

- Larkin Arnold – executive producer
- George Duke – producer (1, 4–6)
- Deniece Williams – producer (2, 3, 7–10)
- Tommy Vicari – remix engineer (1), recording engineer (4–6)
- Tom Perry – engineer (2, 3, 7–10)
- Mick Guzauski – recording engineer (4–6)
- Nick Spigel – second engineer (4–6)
- Mitch Gibson – second string engineer (4)
- Bernie Grundman – mastering at Bernie Grundman Mastering (Hollywood, California)
- Constance Guzman – production assistant
- Tony Lane – art direction
- Nancy Donald – art direction
- Margaret MacFarlane – photography
- Bridget Bergman – make-up

== Chart performance ==
Year	Chart	Peak position
1984	US Billboard Top 200 Albums	26
1984	US Billboard Top Black Albums	10
1984	Dutch Albums	17
1984	German Albums	59
