= Niecy =

Studio album by Deniece Williams
- Released: March 19, 1982
- Recorded: 1981
- Studios: Sigma Sound, Philadelphia, Pennsylvania
- Genres: R&B, soul
- Length: 33:14
- Label: ARC/Columbia
- Producers: Thom Bell, Deniece Williams

Deniece Williams chronology
My Melody (1981)	Niecy (1982)	I'm So Proud (1983)

Singles from Niecy
- 1. "It's Gonna Take a Miracle" Released: March 1982; 2. "Waiting by the Hotline" Released: June 1982; 3. "Waiting" Released: October 1982

Niecy is an album by American singer Deniece Williams, released in 1982 on ARC/Columbia Records. The album reached No. 5 on the Top Soul Albums chart and No. 20 on the Billboard 200.

== Critical reception ==
Professional ratings
Review scores
Source	Rating
AllMusic	4/5 stars
Robert Christgau	B+

With a B+, Robert Christgau found "Williams's exquisite clarity and thrilling range have always slotted her among the perfect angels for me, but there's a lot more to her work with Thom Bell, who finally challenges Burt Bacharach on his own turf, applying strings and woodwinds and amplifiers with a deft economy that textures rather than sweetens. And Williams's lyrics, while never startling, become increasingly personal as her professional confidence grows--she's wrinkling her brow more and her nose less." People described the album as "upbeat, soulful and polished."

Justin Kantor of AllMusic wrote that "Williams enlisted Philly soulmeister Thom Bell as her co-producer (and primary co-writer) a second time on this mellow 1982 release. Building upon the lush balladry of 1981's My Melody, this set inevitably bears a few similarities to its predecessor, but manages a more diverse soundscape." J.D. Considine of Musician wrote: "Williams like the Spinners' Philippe Wynne has the uncanny ability to pull the most out of a tune while maintaining a distinctive vocal personality. Philly Soul lives." Crispin Cioe of High Fidelity found "as a writer, Williams deals in the unabashedly romantic; as a singer she lends her lines an emotionalism that rings true. In Bell's sympathetically rich arranging/production context small sentiments take on grand proportions, and therein lies the album's charm."

== Singles ==
A cover of the Royalettes' "It's Gonna Take a Miracle" was released as a single. The song peaked at No. 1 on the Billboard Hot R&B Songs chart, No. 6 on the Billboard Adult Contemporary Singles chart and No. 10 on the Billboard Hot 100 chart.

== Track listing ==
Side one
No.	Title	Writer(s)	Length
1.	"Waiting by the Hotline"	Deniece Williams, Thom Bell	3:40
2.	"It's Gonna Take a Miracle"	Teddy Randazzo, Bob Weinstein, Lou Stallman	4:10
3.	"Love Notes"	Deniece Williams, Skip Scarborough	4:22
4.	"I Believe in Miracles"	Deniece Williams, Bill Neale	2:52

Side two
No.	Title	Writer(s)	Length
1.	"How Does It Feel"	Deniece Williams, Thom Bell	5:50
2.	"Waiting"	Deniece Williams, Thom Bell	4:32
3.	"Now Is the Time for Love"	Deniece Williams, Thom Bell	4:09
4.	"A Part of Love"	Deniece Williams, Kevin Bassinson	3:39

== Personnel ==
Musicians

- Deniece Williams – vocals
- Thom Bell – keyboards, backing vocals, arrangements and conductor
- George Merrill – synthesizers, backing vocals
- Bobby Eli – guitars
- Bill Neale – guitars, strings (4)
- Bob Babbitt – bass guitar, Piccolo bass
- Charles Collins – drums
- Ed Shea – percussion
- Larry Washington – percussion
- Don Renaldo – strings, horns
- Joseph B. Jefferson – backing vocals

Production

- Thom Bell – producer
- Deniece Williams – producer
- Joe Tarsia – second engineer
- Dirk Devlen – second engineer
- Michael Tarsia – second engineer
- Mike Reese – mastering at The Mastering Lab (Hollywood, California)
- Bill Neale – production coordinator
- Nancy Donald – design
- Allan Luftig – photography

== Charts ==
=== Weekly charts ===
Chart (1982)	Peak position
US Billboard 200	20
US Top R&B/Hip-Hop Albums (Billboard)	5

=== Year-end charts ===
Chart (1982)	Position
US Top R&B/Hip-Hop Albums (Billboard)	32

=== Singles ===
Year	Single	Chart	Position
1982	"It's Gonna Take a Miracle"	US Billboard Hot 100	10
1982	"It's Gonna Take a Miracle"	US Billboard R&B Singles	1
1982	"It's Gonna Take a Miracle"	US Billboard Adult Contemporary Singles	6
1982	"Waiting by the Hotline"	US Billboard Hot 100	103
1982	"Waiting by the Hotline"	US Billboard R&B Singles	29
1982	"Waiting"	US Billboard R&B Singles	72
