= When Love Comes Calling (Deniece Williams album) =

Studio album by Deniece Williams
- Released: June 22, 1979
- Recorded: 1978–1979
- Studio: Sunset Sound (Los Angeles, California); Davlen Studios (Los Angeles, California); Kendun Recorders (Los Angeles, California); Devonshire Studios (Los Angeles, California)
- Genre: R&B, soul
- Length: 32:30
- Label: ARC/Columbia
- Producer: David Foster, Ray Parker Jr.

Deniece Williams chronology
That's What Friends Are For (1978)	When Love Comes Calling (1979)	My Melody (1981)

Singles from When Love Comes Calling
- 1. "I've Got the Next Dance" Released: April 1979

When Love Comes Calling is an album by American singer Deniece Williams, released in June 1979 on ARC/Columbia Records. The album peaked at No. 27 on the Billboard Top Soul LPs chart.

== Overview ==
When Love Comes Calling was produced by Ray Parker Jr. and David Foster. Artists such as Maurice White, Bill Champlin of Chicago and Toto's Steve Lukather are guests on the album.

== Critical reception ==
Professional ratings
Review scores
Source	Rating
AllMusic	3/5 stars
Smash Hits	5/10
The Virgin Encyclopedia of R&B and Soul	3/5 stars

Connie Johnson of the Los Angeles Times wrote that "this album (coproduced by Raydio's Ray Parker Jr.), nicely showcases Williams' expressive voice, and those translucent high C's she's capable of reaching."

== Covers ==
"God Knows" is a cover of a Debby Boone song.

== Singles ==
The single, "I've Got the Next Dance", reached No. 1 on the Billboard Dance Club Play chart and No. 26 on the Billboard Hot Soul Songs chart.

== Track listing ==
Side one
No.	Title	Writer(s)	Length
1.	"I Found Love"	Fritz Baskett, Randy Nichols, Deniece Williams	3:40
2.	"Are You Thinking?"	Raina Taylor, Deniece Williams	4:19
3.	"My Prayer"		0:23
4.	"I've Got the Next Dance"	Cheyenne Fowler, Keg Johnson	5:49
5.	"Touch Me Again"	Tennyson Stevens, Deniece Williams	5:10

Side two
No.	Title	Writer(s)	Length
6.	"When Love Comes Calling"	Carole Pinckes, David Foster, Deniece Williams	3:27
7.	"God Knows"	Franne Golde, Peter Noone, Allee Willis	4:09
8.	"Like Magic"	Geary Lanier, Robert Wright	3:31
9.	"Turn Around"	Randy Nichols, Deniece Williams	3:48
10.	"Why Can't We Fall in Love?"	David Foster, Carole Bayer-Sager, Deniece Williams	4:30

== Charts ==
Chart (1979)	Position
US Top Soul LPs	27
US Top LPs & Tape	96

Year	Single	Chart	Position
1979	"I Found Love"	US Soul Singles	32
1979	"I've Got the Next Dance"	US Hot 100	73
1979	"I've Got the Next Dance"	US Soul Singles	26
1979	"I've Got the Next Dance"	Club Play Singles	1

== Personnel ==
Musicians

- Deniece Williams – lead vocals (1, 2, 4–10), backing vocals (1, 2, 4, 7, 9, 10), a cappella vocal performance (3)
- Larry Farrow – keyboards (1)
- Sylvester Rivers – keyboards (1), arrangements (1), rhythm arrangements (2, 8, 9)
- David Foster – keyboards (2, 4, 6, 7, 10), acoustic piano (5), arrangements (6), backing vocals (6), string arrangements (10)
- Greg Phillinganes – keyboards (8, 9)
- Charles Fearing – guitars (1, 9)
- Ray Parker Jr. – guitars (1, 2, 4, 6, 8, 9), backing vocals (1)
- Steve Lukather – guitars (2, 4, 6, 7, 10)
- Richard Feldman – guitars (7)
- Wah Wah Watson – guitars (8)
- David Sheilds – bass (1, 9)
- Mike Porcaro – bass (2, 4)
- David Hungate – bass (6, 7, 10)
- Scott Edwards – bass (8)
- Jeff Porcaro – drums (1, 6, 7, 9, 10)
- Ed Greene – drums (2, 4, 8)
- Ollie E. Brown – percussion (1, 8, 9)
- Gary Coleman – vibraphone (1, 9)
- Paulinho da Costa – percussion (2, 7, 10)
- Eddie "Bongo" Brown – bongos (8)
- Jack Ashford – tambourine (8)
- Gary Herbig – saxophone solo (4)
- Don Myrick – saxophone solo (8)
- Gene Page – horn and string arrangements (1, 8, 9)
- Greg Mathieson – arrangements (4)
- Jeremy Lubbock – string arrangements and conductor (5)
- Jerry Hey – horn arrangements (6, 7, 10)
- Bill Myers – string arrangements (7)
- Frank DeCaro – string contractor (1, 5, 7–10)
- Sarah Page – string contractor (1, 5, 7–10)
- Dyanne Chandler – backing vocals (1, 9)
- Maurice White – backing vocals (1, 10)
- Maxine Willard Waters – backing vocals (1, 2, 9)
- Julia Tillman Waters – backing vocals (2)
- Bill Champlin – backing vocals (4, 6, 7, 10)
- Sidney Barnes – backing vocals (8)

Production

- Producers – Ray Parker Jr. (Tracks 1, 3, 8 & 9); David Foster (Tracks 2, 4–7 & 10).
- Co-Producer – Deniece Williams
- Engineers – Humberto Gatica (Tracks 1–7, 9 & 10); Ron Malo (Track 8).
- Assistant Engineers – Corey Bailey, Mark Linett, Michael Mancini, Raffaello Mazza and Bo Torian.
- Design – Nancy Donald
- Photography – Richard Arrindell
