= Roby Duke =

American musician (1956–2007)

- Born: Roby Ward Duke; December 6, 1956; Greenwood, Mississippi
- Origin: United States
- Died: December 26, 2007 (aged 51) Brier, Washington
- Genres: CCM
- Occupations: Singer, songwriter
- Instrument: Acoustic guitar
- Years active: 1968–2007
- Labels: Good News, Ocean

Roby Duke (December 6, 1956 – December 26, 2007) was a contemporary Christian musician and songwriter from Greenwood, Mississippi. He was noted for his blues-inflected vocal style and rhythmic "thumping" acoustic guitar playing.

== Discography ==
- 1980 Not the Same
- 1984 Come Let Us Reason
- 1986 Blue Eyed Soul
- 1989 Down to Business
- 1994 Bridge Divine
- 2004 Ghost
- 2006 Relaxed Fits
