= This Is as Good as It Gets =

1988 single by Deniece Williams

Single by Deniece Williams

from the album As Good as It Gets
- Released: 1988
- Length: 4:31
- Label: Columbia
- Songwriter(s): R. Boustead
- Producer(s): George Duke

"This Is as Good as It Gets " is a song written by R. Boustead and recorded by Deniece Williams for her 1988 album As Good as It Gets. Produced by George Duke, the song was released as a single in 1988 by Columbia Records, reaching number 29 on the US Billboard Hot Black Singles chart.

== Critical reception ==
Hugh Wyatt of the New York Daily News described the song as "a loving, thoughtful ballad".

== Charts ==
Chart (1988)	Peak position
US Hot Black Singles (Billboard)	29
