= Deniece Williams =

American R&B and soul singer (born 1950)

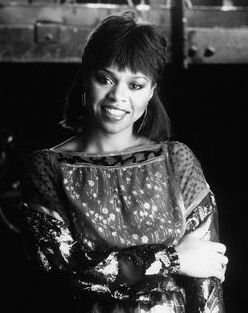
- Williams in 1982

Background information
- Also known as: Niecy Williams
- Born: June Deniece Chandler; June 3, 1950 (age 76); Gary, Indiana, U.S.
- Genres: Soul; R&B; disco; gospel
- Occupation: Singer
- Years active: 1968–present
- Labels: Columbia; ARC; MCA; Atlantic; Sparrow; Shanachie
- Spouse(s): Kendrick Williams (m. 1970; div. 1975) Christipher Joy (m. 1981; div. 1982) Brad Westering (m. 1986; div. 1993)

June Deniece Williams (née Chandler; born June 3, 1950) is an American singer. She has been described as "one of the great soul voices" by the BBC.

She is best known for the songs "Free", "Silly", "It's Gonna Take a Miracle" and two Billboard Hot 100 No.1 singles "Let's Hear It for the Boy" and "Too Much, Too Little, Too Late" (with Johnny Mathis).

Williams has won four Grammys with twelve nominations altogether. She (with Johnny Mathis) is also known for recording "Without Us", the theme song of Family Ties.

== Early life ==
June Deniece Chandler was born and raised in Gary, Indiana, United States.

She attended Morgan State University in Baltimore, Maryland, in the hopes of becoming a registered nurse and an anesthetist, but she dropped out after a year and a half. She recalled, "You have to be a good student to be in college, and I wasn't."

== Career ==
=== Early years (late 1960s–1975) ===
Williams started performing while a college student, "a part-time job singing at a club, Casino Royal, and I liked it. It was a lot of fun." During those years, she also worked at a telephone company and as a ward clerk at the Chicago Mercy Hospital.

She recorded for The Toddlin' Town group of labels as Deniece Chandler. One of those early records, "I'm Walking Away", was released on Toddlin's subsidiary Lock Records in the late 1960s, is a favorite on England's Northern Soul scene. A brief spell in 1969 with Patti Hamilton's the Lovelites resulted in her lead on "I'm Not Like the Others", a track that was eventually released in 1999.

=== Becoming established (1975–1987) ===
She became a backup vocalist for Stevie Wonder as part of "Wonderlove", lending her vocals on his albums Talking Book, Fulfillingness' First Finale, and Songs in the Key of Life. Williams also appeared on Syreeta Wright's 1974 album Stevie Wonder Presents: Syreeta, Minnie Riperton's 1974 album Perfect Angel and Roberta Flack's 1975 album Feel Like Makin' Love and 1977 album Blue Lights in the Basement.

She left Wonder in 1975 to sign a deal with Columbia Records and Kalimba Productions. Kalimba was a production company started by Maurice White and Charles Stepney. Williams went on to work on her first studio album with both White and Stepney as its producers. Released in August 1976 This Is Niecy rose to Nos. 3 and 33 on the Top R&B/Hip-Hop Albums and Billboard 200 charts respectively. This Is Niecy has also been certified Gold in the United States by the RIAA and silver in the UK by the British Phonographic Industry. An album cut, "Free", got to Nos. 1, 2 & 25 on the UK Singles, Billboard Hot R&B Songs and Hot 100 charts respectively. Another single being "That's What Friends Are For" rose to No. 8 on the UK Singles chart.

A few months before the release of This Is Niecy, Charles Stepney died. White went on to single-handedly produce Williams' second album, Song Bird, released in October 1977. The album rose to No. 23 on the Billboard Top Soul Albums chart. Simon Gage of The Daily Express found "Song Bird" "filled with gorgeous songs that showcase her four-octave range to full effect". John Rockwell of The New York Times also wrote: "Deniece Williams's "Song Bird" is a most appealing album for anyone who likes varied, skillful and sophisticated singing in the black pop area. One can't be more stylistically precise than that because it is a characteristic of Maurice White's production and Miss Williams's virtuousically diverse singing that her disk ambles all over the stylistic map. But instead of sounding diffuse, it sounds refreshingly varied." A tune from the album called "Baby, Baby My Love's All for You", reached No. 13 on the Billboard Hot Soul Songs chart and No. 32 UK Singles chart.

Williams guested on Roberta Flack's 1977 album, Blue Lights in the Basement, and sang along with Maurice White on Weather Report's 1978 album, Mr. Gone. Williams also recorded a duet with Johnny Mathis, called "Too Much, Too Little, Too Late" that reached No. 1 on the Billboard Hot 100, Hot Soul Songs and Adult Contemporary Songs charts.

Williams went on to issue a duet album with Johnny Mathis dubbed That's What Friends Are For in 1978 on Columbia for Kalimba Productions. Paul Sexton of Record Mirror commented "their coupling is quite satisfactory from an artistic point of view." Dennis Hunt of the Los Angeles Times said that "Mathis' duets with Williams have rescued him from the MOR graveyard and given him new life in the pop/R&B market. This album, far superior to the last featuring this pair, brims with romantic material. To make sure no one mistakes these songs for MOR, producer Jack Gold has tacked on sprightly rhythm tracks which turn some of them into gentle rockers."

A cover version of Marvin Gaye and Tammi Terrell's "You're All I Need to Get By" peaked at No. 5 on the RPM Canadian Adult Contemporary Songs chart, No. 10 on the US Billboard Hot Soul Singles Chart and No. 16 on the Billboard Adult Contemporary songs chart. The LP rose to No. 14 on the Billboard Top Soul Albums chart and No. 19 on the Billboard 200 chart. That's What Friends Are For has also been certified Gold in the US by the RIAA.

William's fourth studio recording, When Love Comes Calling was issued in 1979 by ARC Records (ARC), Maurice White's vanity label on Columbia. Connie Johnson of the Los Angeles Times proclaimed "This album (coproduced by Raydio's Ray Parker Jr.), nicely showcases Williams' expressive voice, and those translucent high C's she's capable of reaching." The album rose to No. 27 on the Billboard Top Soul Albums chart. A single from the album, "I've Got the Next Dance", rose to No. 1 on the Billboard Dance/Club Play chart.

Williams issued her follow-up album, My Melody, in 1981 on Columbia/ARC. The Philadelphia Inquirer opined "Although her roots are R&B, Miss Williams transcends easy categorisation with this collection of material and her versatile presentation." Stephen Holden of The New York Times also found that "My Melody, Miss Williams's fourth solo album, is an inspired collaboration with Thom Bell, the Philadelphia songwriter and producer whose hits with the Stylistics and the Spinners in the early 70's epitomized pop-soul elegance." The album rose to No. 13 on the Billboard Top Soul Albums chart. My Melody has been certified Gold in the US by the RIAA. The single, "Silly", reached No. 11 on the Billboard Hot Soul Songs chart.

Williams issued her follow-up album, Niecy, in 1982 on Columbia/ARC. The album reached No. 5 on the Top Soul Albums chart and No. 20 on the Billboard 200. With a B+ Robert Christgau of the Village Voice found "Williams's exquisite clarity and thrilling range have always slotted her among the perfect angels for me, but there's a lot more to her work with Thom Bell, who finally challenges Burt Bacharach on his own turf, applying strings and woodwinds and amplifiers with a deft economy that textures rather than sweetens. And Williams's lyrics, while never startling, become increasingly personal as her professional confidence grows--she's wrinkling her brow more and her nose less." Crispin Cioe of High Fidelity found "as a writer, Williams deals in the unabashedly romantic; as a singer she lends her lines an emotionalism that rings true. In Bell's sympathetically rich arranging/production context small sentiments take on grand proportions, and therein lies the album's charm."

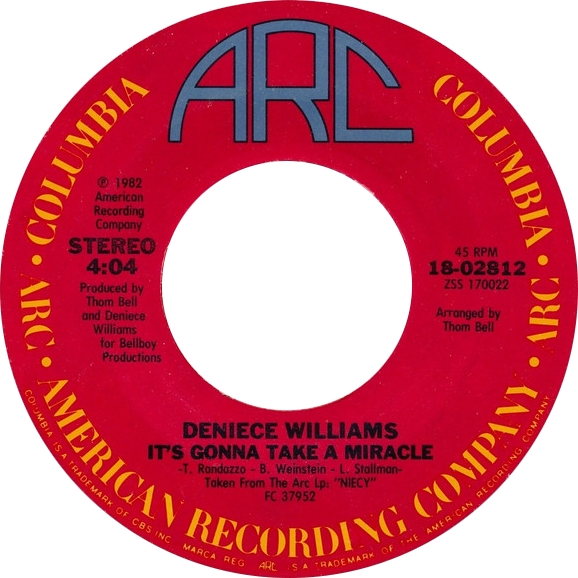
Side A of Williams's US single "It's Gonna Take a Miracle"

A cover of the Royalettes' "It's Gonna Take a Miracle" reached No. 1 on the Billboard Hot Soul Songs chart and No. 10 on the Billboard Hot 100 chart. Williams and Mathis collaborated once again to record "Without Us" the theme song of the sitcom Family Ties which debuted in September 1982.

In the Netherlands the album track "It's Your Conscience" had been released as a single. It climbed to No. 15 on the Dutch Top 40 charts.

During 1983 she released her seventh studio album, I'm So Proud, which got to No. 10 on the Billboard Top R&B Albums chart. Connie Johnson of the Los Angeles Times wrote: "The album works due to fresh-sounding, quality material. This is black pop at its most enterprising." I'm So Proud was also nominated for a Grammy in the Best R&B Vocal Performance, Female category. In 1984, Williams released her follow up album Let's Hear It for the Boy. This album reached No. 26 on the US Billboard 200 Albums chart and No. 10 on the US Billboard Top R&B/Hop-Hop Albums chart. The title track reached No. 1 on the Billboard Hot 100, Hot Soul Songs and Dance Club Play Songs charts. The hit single was eventually certified Platinum in the US by the RIAA, Gold in Canada by Music Canada and Gold the UK by the BPI. Additionally, the song was featured on the soundtrack to the feature film Footloose. She later guested on Johnny Mathis' 1984 album A Special Part of Me, Stevie Wonder's 1985 LP, In Square Circle and James Taylor's 1985 album That's Why I'm Here.

=== Gospel (1980–1987) ===
Although Williams had recorded one inspirational song on almost each of her mainstream albums, it was in 1980 that her musical career path began to change favoring Gospel music. Williams joined with friends Philip Bailey of Earth, Wind & Fire fame, Billy Davis and Marilyn McCoo to present a gospel show at The Roxy, a popular Los Angeles club: "Jesus at the Roxy". Williams later reported that "God did something miraculous. Over three hundred people were saved." In 1985, at the 27th Annual Grammy Awards, Williams sang an a cappella version of her 1977 composition "God Is Amazing", a Gospel song, rather than her No. 1 song "Let's Hear It for the Boy", much to her record company's disdain.

In 1986, her first gospel studio album, So Glad I Know, was released on Sparrow Records, and got to No. 6 on the Billboard Top Christian Albums chart and was nominated for Best Gospel Performance, Female Grammy. "They Say", a duet with Sandi Patti, Williams won the Grammy Award for Best Gospel Vocal Performance by a Duo or Group, Choir or Chorus and for "I Surrender All", she won the Grammy Award for Best Soul Gospel Performance, Female.

=== R&B, Gospel and Jazz (1987–2000) ===
In 1987, she released her tenth studio album, Water Under the Bridge, which rose to No. 39 on the Billboard Top R&B Albums chart. "Never Say Never" reached No. 6 on the Billboard Hot R&B Songs chart and No. 23 on the Billboard Dance Club Songs chart.

A year later she released her follow-up studio album, As Good As It Gets, which rose to No. 48 on the Billboard Top R&B Albums chart. "I Can't Wait" charted at No. 8 on the Billboard Hot R&B Songs chart. Another single, "This Is as Good as It Gets", rose to No. 29 on the Billboard Hot R&B Songs chart.

In 1989, she issued her second Gospel album Special Love. That album reached No. 11 on the Billboard Top Christian Albums chart.

Williams went on to appear on Nancy Wilson's 1990 LP A Lady with a Song, George Duke's 1992 album Snapshot, Stevie Wonder's 1995 LP Conversation Peace, and Spyro Gyra's 1995 album Love & Other Obsessions. In 1999, she released another Gospel album, This Is My Song, on Harmony Records. The album rose to No. 14 on the Billboard Top Gospel Albums chart. This Is My Song also won a Grammy Award for Best Pop/Contemporary Gospel Album.

=== Later years (2000–present) ===
In April 2007, she released another studio album entitled Love, Niecy Style, produced by Philly Soul veteran Bobby Eli, on Shanachie Records. Love, Niecy Style rose to No. 41 on the Billboard R&B/Hip Hop Albums chart. On October 13, 2007, Williams performed in her hometown of Gary, Indiana at the re-opening of the historic Glen Theater. Williams was thereafter recognized by Indiana State Representative Vernon G. Smith as an Outstanding Hoosier.

In October 2007, Williams went on to issue a single called, "Grateful: The Rededication", with Wanda Vaughn of The Emotions and Sherree Brown. The single got to No. 40 on the Billboard Adult R&B Songs chart.

On April 29, 2008, Williams announced that she was preparing a proposal to establish a program called KOP—Kids of Promise—in her hometown of Gary, Indiana. Williams said the program would include a center with classes and programs dedicated to education and the performing arts. On June 27, 2010, Williams performed "Silly" with Monica at the BET Awards. As well in June 2011, Williams featured on Unsung, TV One's musical biography show.

She later made a guest appearance on Cliff Richard's 2011 album Soulicious.

In the fall of 2020, she released a new single called "When You Love Somebody". This was followed by a new EP titled Gemini, released in the fall of 2021. On June 30, 2021, she was honored as one of the first ever inductees into the Women Songwriters Hall of Fame. Williams was, on May 16, 2023, also bestowed with the keys to the city of Kingston, Jamaica.

In August 2025, Williams returned to Gary, Indiana, with her four sons for the dedication of a mural in her honor. Painted by Max Sansing and entitled "Songbird," it is at the corner of 25th Avenue and Broadway.

== Filmography ==
Williams appeared in the 2004 holiday film Christmas Child. In December 2005, she appeared on the reality dating show Elimidate as part of their "Celebrity Week".

== Vocal profile ==
Williams has a four-octave range and distinctive soprano voice. Her vocal range was also pointed out by The New York Times, "Miss Williams mounted a spectacular vocal display in which her penetrating, feline soprano soared effortlessly to E flat above high C, and she worked various vowel sounds into prolonged feats of vocal gymnastics." In pointing to Williams's similar vocal ability as her former musical colleague (Minnie Riperton), Mark Anthony Neal, in referencing Jill Scott's agility in displaying vocal acrobatics, states, "Scott draws on her upper register recalling the artistry of the late Minnie Riperton and "songbird" Deniece Williams." According to Monica Haynes of the Pittsburgh Post-Gazette, Williams "has the kind of range that would make Mariah Carey quiver".

== Personal life ==
Williams has been married three times and has four sons. Williams was married to her middle school sweetheart Kendrick Williams from 1971 until 1975, before she relocated to California in the early 1970s. She has since continued to use her first husband's surname professionally. Together they had two sons, Kendrick Jr. (b. 1972) and Kevin (b. 1973). In May 1981, Williams married actor and minister Christipher Joy. Williams and Joy separated in August 1982, divorcing later that year. From 1986 until 1993, Williams was married to Brad Westering, with whom she had two sons: Forrest (b. 1988) and Logan.

== Grammy Awards ==
The Grammy Awards are awarded annually by the National Academy of Recording Arts and Sciences. Williams has received four awards out of thirteen nominations.

Year	Category	Nominated work	Result
1983	Best Female R&B Vocal Performance	"It's Gonna Take a Miracle"	Nominated
1984	Best Female R&B Vocal Performance	I'm So Proud	Nominated
1984	Best Inspirational Performance	"Whiter Than Snow"	Nominated
1985	Best Female Pop Vocal Performance	"Let's Hear It for the Boy"	Nominated
1985	Best Female R&B Vocal Performance	Let's Hear It for the Boy	Nominated
1987	Best Female Gospel Performance	So Glad I Know	Nominated
1987	Best Female Soul Gospel Performance	"I Surrender All"	Won
1987	Best Duo or Group Gospel Performance	"They Say" (with Sandi Patti)	Won
1988	Best Female Gospel Performance	"I Believe in You"	Won
1989	Best Female Gospel Performance	"Do You Hear What I Hear?"	Nominated
1990	Best Female Gospel Performance	"Healing"	Nominated
1990	Best R&B Performance by a Duo or Group	"We Sing Praises" (with Natalie Cole)	Nominated
1999	Best Pop/Contemporary Gospel Album	This Is My Song	Won

== See also ==
- List of number-one hits (United States)
- List of artists who reached number one on the Hot 100 (U.S.)
- List of number-one dance hits (United States)
- List of artists who reached number one on the U.S. Dance chart
