= These Songs for You, Live! =

Live album by Donny Hathaway
- Released: June 8, 2004
- Recorded: 1972, 1980
- Genres: R&B, soul
- Label: Atlantic

Donny Hathaway chronology
A Donny Hathaway Collection (1990)	These Songs for You, Live! (2004)

These Songs for You, Live!, released in 2004, is a live album compiled from two rare and out-of-print live albums by Donny Hathaway, Live and In Performance. Additionally, the album includes a number of previously unreleased tracks, a rare interview and the song "Valdez In The Country" from Donny's performance during the Newport Jazz Festival in 1973.

== Track listing ==
No.	Title	Writer(s)	Length
1.	"Flying Easy" (Previously unreleased)	Donny Hathaway	3:11
2.	"Valdez in the Country" (Previously released on Recorded Live at Newport in New York)	Donny Hathaway	4:08
3.	"Someday We'll All Be Free" (Previously unreleased)	Donny Hathaway, Edward Howard	5:30
4.	"You've Got a Friend" (from Live)	Carole King	4:34
5.	"He Ain't Heavy, He's My Brother" (Previously unreleased)	Bob Russell, Bobby Scott	7:49
6.	"What's Going On" (from Live)	Alfred Cleveland, Marvin Gaye, Renaldo "Obie" Benson	5:23
7.	"Yesterday" (Previously unreleased)	John Lennon, Paul McCartney	5:24
8.	"Superwoman" (Previously unreleased)	Stevie Wonder	6:43
9.	"A Song for You" (from In Performance)	Leon Russell	5:48
10.	"Sack Full of Dreams" (from In Performance)	Gary McFarland, Lou Savary	5:30
11.	"Little Ghetto Boy" (from Live)	Earl DeRouen, Edward Howard	4:33
12.	"I Love You More Than You'll Ever Know" (from In Performance)	Al Kooper	5:55
13.	"The Ghetto"" (from Live)	Donny Hathaway, Leroy Hutson	12:21
14.	"Interview" (Previously unreleased)	—	2:58
