= I Just Can't Help Myself =

Studio album by Terry Callier
- Released: July 1973
- Studio: Chess, Chicago, Illinois, U. S.; RCA, Chicago, Illinois, U. S.
- Genre: Soul
- Length: 40:51
- Language: English
- Label: Cadet
- Producer: Terry Callier; Charles Stepney; Larry Wade

Terry Callier chronology
What Color Is Love (1972)	I Just Can't Help Myself (1973)	Fire on Ice (1978)

I Just Can't Help Myself is a studio album from American musician Terry Callier. Released by Cadet Records in 1973, this is the artist's fourth album since his debut a decade prior and the final of three that he recorded in short succession for Cadet with producer Charles Stepney. It has received positive critical reception.

== Critical reception ==
The editorial staff of AllMusic Guide gave the release five out of five stars, with Jason Ankeny writing that the album is Callier's "most soulful and supple" for Cadet, comparing it to Marvin Gaye's classic run at Motown Records.

== Track listing ==
All songs written by Terry Callier, except where noted.

1. "(I Just Can't Help Myself) I Don't Want Nobody Else" (Callier, Larry Wade) – 3:15
2. "Brown-Eyed-Lady" (Callier, Wade) – 3:18
3. "Gotta Get Closer to You" (Callier, Wade) – 3:22
4. "Satin Doll" (Duke Ellington, Johnny Mercer, Billy Strayhorn) – 4:16
5. "Until Tomorrow" – 5:39
6. "Alley-Wind Song" – 9:04
7. "Can't Catch the Trane" – 3:52
8. "Bowlin' Green" (Callier, Holmes Daylie) – 8:00

== Personnel ==
- Terry Callier – guitar, vocals, production
- Arthur W. Ahlman – viola
- Roger Anfinsen – engineering
- Jerry Sabransky – violin
- Errol Batts – backing vocals
- Sol Bobrov – violin
- Fred Breitberg – remixing
- Leonard Chausow – cello
- Malcolm Chisholm – remixing
- Bobby Christian – percussion
- Edward Druzinsky – harp
- Cleveland Eaton – bass guitar
- Richard Evans – bass guitar, arrangement on "Satin Doll", "Alley-Wind Song", and "Bowlin' Green"
- William Faldner – violin
- Karl Fruh – cello
- Joseph Golan – violin
- Elliott Golub – violin
- Ruth Goodman – violin
- Bruce Hayden – viola
- John Howell – trumpet
- Arthur Hoyle – trumpet
- Morris Jennings – drums
- Irving Kaplan – violin
- Harold D. Klatz – viola
- Phylis Knox – backing vocals
- Harold Kupper – viola
- Ethel Merker – French horn
- Roger Moulton – viola
- Don Myrick – alto saxophone
- Alfred Nalls – percussion
- Louis Satterfield – bass guitar
- Bob Schiff – arrangement on "(I Just Can't Help Myself) I Don't Want Nobody Else" and "Gotta Get Closer to You"
- Donald Simmons – drums
- Theodore Silavin – violin
- Gary Starr – engineering
- Charles Stepney – electric piano, piano, production, arrangement on "Brown-Eyed-Lady", "Until Tomorrow", and "Can't Catch the Trane"
- Neil Terk – design, photography
- Paul Tervelt – French horn
- Phil Upchurch – guitar
- Larry Wade – backing vocals, production
- Fred Walker – percussion
- Everett Zlatoff-Mirsky – violin
