= Fire on Ice =

Studio album by Terry Callier
- Released: 1978
- Studio: ABC, Los Angeles, California, U. S.; PS, Chicago, Illinois, U. S.
- Genre: Chicago soul; disco; funk
- Length: 39:24
- Language: English
- Label: Elektra
- Producer: Richard Evans

Terry Callier chronology
I Just Can't Help Myself (1973)	Fire on Ice (1978)	Turn You to Love (1979)

Fire on Ice is a studio album from American musician Terry Callier. Released by Elektra Records in 1978, this is the artist's fifth album and the first with Elektra, released after a four-year break from recording. It has received mixed critical reception.

== Critical reception ==
The editorial staff of AllMusic gave the release three out of five stars, with Thom Jurek writing that the album is Callier's most confounding and "it's hard to know whom to blame for making a mess of what was arguably a solid album", noting that the shift to disco does not work for Callier and that some songs are overproduced but sums up that the release has its own "strangeness and charm". Writing for Pitchfork Media, Andy Beta scored this album and the subsequent Turn You to Love a 5.5. out of 10, writing that Fire on Ice "sputters on so many levels that it's hard to isolate just where things misfire".

== Track listing ==
All songs written by Terry Callier, except where noted.

1. "Be a Believer" – 4:38
2. "Holdin' On (To Your Love)" (Callier, Larry Wade) – 4:08
3. "Street Fever" (Callier, Wade) – 3:42
4. "Butterfly" – 3:56
5. "I Been Doin' Alright Part II (Everything's Gonna Be Alright)" – 2:47
6. "Disco in the Sky" (Callier, Wade) – 4:16
7. "African Violet" – 7:13
8. "Love Two Love" (Wade) – 2:43
9. "Martin St. Martin" (Callier, Wade) – 5:34

== Personnel ==
- Terry Callier – guitar, vocals
- Corinne Albright – baritone saxophone
- Marilyn H. Baker – viola
- Sidney Barnes – vocals
- Jynean Bell – vocals
- Dolores Bing – cello
- Michael Boddicker – synthesizer
- George Bohanon – trombone
- Harry Brotman – engineering
- Garnett Brown – trombone
- Julianna Buffum – cello
- Reginald "Sonny" Burke – keyboards
- Ron Clark – violin
- Jimmy Cleaveland – trombone
- Scott Edwards – bass guitar
- Richard Evans – arrangement, production, mixing
- James Gadson – drums
- Janice Gower – violin
- Carmen Halsell – engineering
- Eddie Harris – saxophone
- William Henderson – violin
- Paul Humphrey – drums
- Fred Jackson Jr. – tenor saxophone
- Morris Jennings – percussion
- Zollie Johnson – engineering
- Renita Koven – viola
- Betty LaMagna – violin
- Carl LaMagna – violin
- Danny Leake – guitar
- Mary Lundquist – violin
- Kenny Mason – trumpet
- Don Mizell – mixing, executive production
- Charles Owens – saxophone
- Barney Perkins – engineering
- Derf Reklaw – percussion
- Minnie Riperton – vocals
- Scott Rowley – engineering
- Jackson Schwartz – engineering
- Paul Serrano – trumpet, engineering, mixing
- Ross Traut – guitar
- Phil Upchurch – guitar
- Marcia Van Dyke – violin
- Larry Wade – guitar
- Cynthia White – vocals
- Ellie Willis – vocals
- Eugene Young – trumpet
