= Someday We'll All Be Free =

Someday We'll All Be Free may refer to:

== Albums ==
- Someday We'll All Be Free (album), by Bobby Womack, 1985

== Songs ==
- "Someday We'll All Be Free" (Donny Hathaway song), 1973
- "Someday We'll All Be Free" (Kanye West song), 2022
