= Marshall Hawkins =

Marshall Hawkins may refer to:

- Marshall Hawkins (basketball)
- Marshall Hawkins (musician)
