= Upendo Ni Pamoja =

Studio album by Ramsey Lewis
- Released: 1972
- Recorded: 1972
- Genre: Jazz
- Label: Columbia; KC 31096
- Producer: Ramsey Lewis

Ramsey Lewis chronology
Back to the Roots (1971)	Upendo Ni Pamoja (1972)	Funky Serenity (1973)

Upendo Ni Pamoja is a studio album by the pianist Ramsey Lewis, released in 1972 on Columbia Records. In the US, the album peaked at No. 1 on the Billboard Best Selling Jazz LPs chart and No. 9 on the Billboard Best Selling Soul LPs chart.

== Reception ==
Professional ratings
Review scores
Source	Rating
AllMusic	3/5 stars
The Encyclopedia of Popular Music	3/5 stars
The Penguin Guide to Jazz Recordings	2.5/4 stars

Jason Elias of AllMusic stated, "The problem with this is that few tracks stay with the listener. This is a cut or two away from being truly essential".

== Track listing ==
All compositions by Ramsey Lewis except as indicated

1. "Slipping into Darkness" (Papa Dee Allen, Harold Brown, B.B. Dickerson, Lonnie Jordan, Charles Miller, Lee Oskar, Howard E. Scott) – 6:15
2. "People Make the World Go Round" (Thom Bell, Linda Creed) – 4:51
3. "Please Send Me Someone to Love" (Percy Mayfield) – 4:33
4. "Got to Be There" (Elliot Willensky) – 3:03
5. "Concierto de Aranjuez" (Joaquín Rodrigo) – 8:55
6. "Upendo Ni Pamoja (Love Is Together)" (Eddie Green) – 7:22
7. "Trilogy: Morning/The Nite Before/Eteral Peace" (Cleveland Eaton) – 8:46
8. "Put Your Hand in the Hand" (Gene MacLellan) – 3:52
9. "Collage" (Eddie Green) – 6:32

== Personnel ==
- Ramsey Lewis – piano, electric piano
- Cleveland Eaton – bass, electric bass
- Morris Jennings – drums, percussion

== Charts ==
Chart	Peak position
US Billboard Top LPs	79
US Best Selling Jazz LPs (Billboard)	1
US Best Selling Soul LPs (Billboard)	9
