= What Color Is Love =

Studio album by Terry Callier
- Released: August 1972
- Studios: RCA, Chicago, Illinois, United States
- Genres: Soul; folk; jazz; R&B; psychedelia; funk
- Length: 40:38
- Language: English
- Label: Cadet
- Producer: Charles Stepney

Terry Callier chronology
Occasional Rain (1972)	What Color Is Love (1972)	I Just Can't Help Myself (1973)

What Color Is Love is a 1972 studio album by American musician Terry Callier. Released by Cadet Records, it is Callier's third album and the second of a trilogy that he recorded in short succession for Cadet with producer Charles Stepney. It has received positive critical reception.

== Critical reception ==
The editorial staff of AllMusic Guide gave What Color Is Love five out of five stars and named it their pick among his discography, with Ryan Randall Globe writing that the album is a "musical kaleidoscope", adding, "the music on this brilliant album defies all categories, embracing Terry Callier's wide range of influences and experiences". On Craig Charles' BBC program The Craig Charles Funk and Soul Show, he dedicated an episode to What Color Is Love as number 22 on the top 40 funk albums of all time, highlighting four tracks and calling the release "lovely".

== Track listing ==
All songs written by Terry Callier, except where noted

1. "Dancing Girl" – 8:58
2. "What Color Is Love" – 4:04
3. "You Goin' Miss Your Candyman" (Phyllis Braxton, Callier) – 7:20
4. "Just as Long as We're in Love" (Callier, Larry Wade) – 3:40
5. "Ho Tsing Mee (A Song of the Sun)" – 4:20
6. "I'd Rather Be with You" (Jerry Butler, Callier, Wade) – 6:38
7. "You Don't Care" (Callier, Wade) – 5:28

== Personnel ==
- Terry Callier – guitar, vocals
- Arthur W. Ahlman – viola
- Roger Anfinsen – engineering
- Leonard Chausow – cello
- Bobby Christian – percussion
- Brian Christian – remixing
- Edward Druzinsky – harp
- William Faldner – violin
- Karl B. Fruth – cello
- Joseph Golan – violin
- Elliot M. Golub – violin
- Ruth Goodman – violin
- Vivian Harrell – backing vocals
- Bruce Hayden – viola
- Kitty Haywood – backing vocals
- John Howell – trumpet
- Arthur Hoyle – trumpet
- Morris Jennings – drums
- Irving Kaplan – violin
- Harold D. Klatz – viola
- Harold Kupper – viola
- Ethel Merker – horn
- Roger Moulton – viola
- Donald Myrick – alto saxophone, flute
- Alfred Nalls – bongo, congas
- Jerry Sabransky – violin
- Louis Satterfield – bass guitar
- Theodore Silavin – violin
- Donald Simmons – drums
- Gary Starr – supervising engineering
- Charles Stepney – electric piano, piano, conducting, production, arrangement
- Paul Tervelt – horn
- Cyril Touff – harmonica
- Phil Upchurch – guitar
- Shirley Wahls – backing vocals
- Fred Walker – congas, percussion
- Everett Zlatoff-Mirsky – violin
