= Back to the Roots =

Back to the Roots may refer to:

- Back to the Roots (John Mayall album), 1971
- Back to the Roots (Ramsey Lewis album), 1971
