= Morris Jennings =

American jazz and blues musician (1939–2016)

Morris Jennings (1938 – June 3, 2016) was an American drummer and musician from Chicago. He recorded as Moe Jennings, M. Jennings, Maurice Jennings, Morris "Gator" Jennings, and Morris Jennings Jr.

Jennings played drums on the Electric Mud album by Muddy Waters, the 1969 album The Howlin' Wolf Album by Howlin' Wolf, and the 1972 Curtis Mayfield album Super Fly. His work at Chess Records includes "California Soul" by Marlena Shaw, which includes an unusual two-bar break early in the song.

In 1970, Jennings joined the Ramsey Lewis Trio, replacing Maurice White.

Jennings died at his South Side Chicago home of natural causes at the age of 77 on June 3, 2016.

== Discography ==
With Roy Buchanan

- When a Guitar Plays the Blues (Alligator, 1985)
- Dancing On the Edge (Alligator, 1986)
- Hot Wires (Alligator, 1987)

With Terry Callier

- What Color Is Love (Cadet, 1972)
- I Just Can't Help Myself (Cadet, 1973)
- Fire On Ice (Elektra, 1978)
- TimePeace (Talkin' Loud 1998)
- Lifetime (Blue Thumb, 1999)
- Lookin' Out (Columbia, 2004)

With Tyrone Davis

- Can't You Tell It's Me (Columbia, 1979)
- I Just Can't Keep On Going (Columbia, 1980)
- Tyrone Davis (Highrise 1982)
- Sexy Thing (Future, 1985)
- Flashin' Back (Future, 1988)
- For the Good Times (Life 1994)
- In the Mood with Tyrone Davis (Big Break, 2013)
- Love and Touch (Solid/Funkytowngrooves, 2015)
- Everything in Place (Solid/Funkytowngrooves, 2017)

With The Dells

- Freedom Means... (Cadet, 1971)
- The Dells Sing Dionne Warwicke's Greatest Hits (Cadet, 1972)
- Whatever Turns You On (20th Century Fox, 1981)
- I Touched a Dream (20th Century Fox, 1980)

With Woody Herman

- Light My Fire (Cadet, 1969)
- Heavy Exposure (Cadet, 1969)

With Ramsey Lewis

- Them Changes (Cadet, 1970)
- Back to the Roots (Cadet, 1971)
- Upendo Ni Pamoja (Columbia, 1972)
- Ramsey Lewis' Newly Recorded All-Time Non-Stop Golden Hits (Columbia, 1973)
- Funky Serenity (Columbia, 1973)
- Solar Wind (Columbia, 1974)
- Sun Goddess (Columbia, 1974)
- Don't It Feel Good (Columbia, 1975)
- Ramsey (Columbia, 1979)
- Three Piece Suite (Columbia, 1981)
- Chance Encounter (Columbia, 1982)
- Les Fleurs (Columbia, 1983)

With Curtis Mayfield

- Super Fly (RCA, 1972)
- Honesty (Boardwalk, 1982)
- We Come in Peace with a Message of Love (CRC, 1985)

With others

- Green Lyte Sunday, Green Lyte Sunday (RCA, 1970)
- Inez Andrews, If Jesus Came to Your Town Today (Ichiban, 1988)
- Ben Branch, The Last Request (Chess, 1968)
- Odell Brown, Free Delivery (Cadet, 1970)
- Oscar Brown Jr., Fresh (Atlantic, 1974)
- Milton Brunson, To All Generations (Creed, 1979)
- Peabo Bryson, Reaching for the Sky (Capitol, 1977)
- Jerry Butler, The Sagittarius Movement (Mercury, 1971)
- Champaign, How 'Bout Us (Columbia, 1981)
- The Chi-Lites, Me and You (20th Century Fox, 1981)
- Otis Clay, The Only Way Is Up (Blues R&B 1985)
- Linda Clifford, I'll Keep On Loving You (Capitol, 1982)
- Albert Collins, Cold Snap (Sonet, 1986)
- Jessy Dixon, You Bring the Sun Out (Light 1979)
- Charles Earland, Earland's Jam (Columbia, 1982)
- Cleveland Eaton, Half and Half (Gamble, 1973)
- Cleveland Eaton, Plenty Good Eaton (Black Jazz, 1975)
- Eddie Harris, I'm Tired of Driving (RCA Victor, 1978)
- Donny Hathaway, Everything Is Everything (ATCO, 1970)
- Donny Hathaway, Donny Hathaway (ATCO, 1971)
- Loleatta Holloway, Loleatta Holloway (Gold Mind, 1979)
- Howlin' Wolf, The Howlin' Wolf Album (Cadet, 1969)
- Melvin Jackson, Funky Skull (Limelight, 1969)
- Syl Johnson, Back in the Game (Delmark, 1994)
- Syl Johnson, Bridge to Legacy (Antone's 1998)
- John Klemmer, Blowin' Gold (Cadet, 1969)
- John Klemmer, Magic Moments (Chess, 1976)
- The Manhattans, Black Tie (CBS, 1981)
- The Manhattans, Forever by Your Side (Columbia, 1983)
- Brother Jack McDuff, The Natural Thing (Cadet, 1968)
- Brother Jack McDuff, Gin and Orange (Cadet, 1969)
- Barry Melton, Bright Sun Is Shining (Vanguard, 1970)
- Gatemouth Moore, After Twenty-One Years (BluesWay, 1973)
- Plush, Fed After Hours (P-Vine, 2002)
- Eugene Record, Trying to Get to You (Warner Bros., 1978)
- Buddy Rich, Speak No Evil (RCA Victor, 1976)
- Rockie Robbins, Rockie Robbins (A&M, 1979)
- Rotary Connection, The Rotary Connection (Chess, 1967)
- Sonny Stitt, Soul Girl (Paula 1973)
- Phil Upchurch, Upchurch (Cadet, 1969)
- Phil Upchurch, The Way I Feel
- Muddy Waters, Electric Mud (Cadet, 1968)
- Muddy Waters, After the Rain (Cadet, 1969)
- Katie Webster, No Foolin'! (Alligator, 1991)
- Marvin Yancy, Heavy Load (P.S., 1987)
- Paul Kahn, These Ears And Eyes (Redwing Music, 1999)
- Catherine Russell, Cat (World Village / Harmonia Mundi, 2006)
