= The Ghetto (Donny Hathaway song) =

1970 single by Donny Hathaway

Single by Donny Hathaway

from the album Everything Is Everything
- A-side: "The Ghetto, Pt. 1"
- B-side: "The Ghetto, Pt. 2"
- Released: 1969
- Recorded: 1969
- Genre: Soul jazz
- Length: 6:50
- Label: Atlantic
- Songwriters: Donny Hathaway; Leroy Hutson
- Producers: Donny Hathaway; Ric Powell

Donny Hathaway singles chronology
"I Wanna Thank You Baby" (1969)	"The Ghetto" (1969)	"You've Got a Friend" (1971)

"The Ghetto" is a socially conscious, mostly instrumental jazz-flavored anthem, released as the first single off American soul singer Donny Hathaway's debut album, Everything Is Everything, released as a single in 1969 on Atlantic Records.

The song was co-written by Hathaway and Leroy Hutson. The song was a 6-minute and 50 second extravaganza which built upon a cinematic feel with its lengthy instrumental though it did feature vocal ad-libs from Hathaway, who played Wurlitzer electronic piano on the song, and constant chants of the song's title. The song has a distinctive Afro-Cuban sound with congas.

The song also featured additional background dialogue from what sounds like men talking on a street corner and a baby crying – that baby being Hathaway's own daughter Lalah before Hathaway ended the song with frenetic hand claps.

When originally released in 1969, the song became a modest charted single, peaking at number 87 on the Billboard Hot 100 and number 23 on the Billboard Hot Soul Singles chart.

Co-writer Leroy Hutson recorded a version of the song entitled "The Ghetto '74" for his album The Man! (1973). Since then, the song has been sampled in hip-hop songs, most famously, Too Short's "The Ghetto", which featured Gerald Levert singing the chorus.

== Personnel ==
- Donny Hathaway: lead vocals, Wurlitzer electronic piano, bass
- Eulalah Hathaway: background vocals
- Master Henry Gibson: conga solo
- Morris Jennings: drums
- Marshall Hawkins: bass
- Phil Upchurch: guitar
- Richard Powell: percussion and timbales solo
- Written and composed by Donny Hathaway and Leroy Hutson
- Conducted and arranged by Donny Hathaway
- Produced by Donny Hathaway and Ric Powell
