= Ramsey Lewis' Newly Recorded All-Time Non-Stop Golden Hits =

Studio album by Ramsey Lewis
- Released: 1973
- Recorded: 1973
- Genre: Jazz
- Length: 35:26
- Labels: Columbia; KC 32490
- Producer: Ramsey Lewis

Ramsey Lewis chronology
| Funky Serenity (1973) | Ramsey Lewis' Newly Recorded All-Time Non-Stop Golden Hits (1973) | Solar Wind (1974) |

Ramsey Lewis' Newly Recorded All-Time Non-Stop Golden Hits (often shortened to Ramsey Lewis' Golden Hits) is a studio album by pianist Ramsey Lewis, recorded in 1973 on Columbia Records. The album reached No. 22 on the Billboard Top Jazz Albums chart.

== Overview ==
Produced by Ramsey Lewis, the album comprises remakes of Lewis' hits on Argo and Cadet Records.

== Reception ==
Professional ratings
Review scores
| Source | Rating |
|---|---|
| AllMusic | 2/5 stars |
| The Rolling Stone Album Guide | 3/5 stars |

Ron Wynn of AllMusic called the album a "budget sampler of pop cuts".

== Track listing ==
1. "Hang on Sloopy" (Wes Farrell, Bert Russell) - 2:13
2. "Blues for the Night Owl" (Sonny Thompson) - 4:17
3. "Hi-Heel Sneakers" (Robert Higgenbotham) - 2:41
4. "Carmen" (Georges Bizet) - 6:51
5. "Song of Delilah" (Ray Evans, Jay Livingston, Victor Young) - 4:46
6. "Wade in the Water" (Traditional) - 2:46
7. "Slipping into Darkness" (Papa Dee Allen, Harold Brown, B.B. Dickerson, Lonnie Jordan, Charles Miller, Lee Oskar, Howard E. Scott) - 6:15
8. "Something You Got" (Chris Kenner) - 3:00
9. "The 'In' Crowd" (Billy Page) - 2:37

== Personnel ==
- Ramsey Lewis – piano, electric piano
- Cleveland Eaton – bass, electric bass
- Morris Jennings – drums, percussion
