= The Way I Feel (Phil Upchurch album) =

Studio album by Phil Upchurch
- Released: 1970
- Recorded: November 1969
- Studio: Ter Mar Studios, Chicago, Illinois
- Genre: Jazz
- Length: 33:44
- Label: Cadet; LPS-840
- Producer: Charles Stepney

Phil Upchurch chronology
Upchurch (1969)	The Way I Feel (1970)	Darkness, Darkness (1970)

The Way I Feel is an album by jazz and R&B guitarist Phil Upchurch recorded in 1969 and released on the Cadet label.

== Reception ==
Professional ratings
Review scores
Source	Rating
Allmusic	3/5 stars

Allmusic awarded the album 3 stars.

== Track listing ==
All compositions by Phil Upchurch except as indicated

1. "Peter, Peter" (Irwin Rosman) – 3:34
2. "Wild Wood" – 3:02
3. "Time for Love (Is Any Time)" (Quincy Jones, Cynthia Weil) – 3:48
4. "The Way I Feel" (Gordon Lightfoot) – 3:20
5. "Bacn' Chips" – 2:49
6. "You Don't Have to Know" – 4:06
7. "I Don't Know" – 2:48
8. "Softly" (Gordon Lightfoot) – 2:33
9. "Pretty Blue" – 2:41
10. "Electrik Head" – 5:03

== Personnel ==
- Phil Upchurch – guitar
- Donny Hathaway – piano
- Louis Satterfield – bass
- Morris Jennings – drums
- Bobby Christian – percussion
- Charles Stepney – arranger and conductor
- Elsa Harris, Kitty Heywood, Cash McCall – backing vocals
