= Someday We'll All Be Free (Kanye West song) =

2022 promotional single by Kanye West

- Image used on the Instagram upload of the song

Promotional single by Kanye West
- Written: December 4, 2022
- Released: December 7, 2022
- Recorded: December 4, 2022
- Genre: Hip-hop
- Length: 2:04
- Songwriter: Kanye West
- Producer: John Cunningham

"Someday We'll All Be Free", also known as "Censori Overload", is a song by American rapper Kanye West. It was released as a promotional single on December 7, 2022, via Instagram and Alex Jones's Infowars website. Built off a looped sample of the song of the same name by Donny Hathaway, "Someday We'll All Be Free" features lyrics about the condemnation West faced following antisemitic remarks he made from October–December 2022, mainly regarding public scrutiny and the business partners he lost as a result.

In October 2022, West received backlash from various statements, including a White Lives Matter shirt he wore at Yeezy Season 9 and "going death con 3" [sic] on Jewish people. On December 1, West praised Adolf Hitler during his appearance on Alex Jones's Infowars show, which was later sampled at the end of the song. Three days following his appearance, West worked with producer John Cunningham at a studio sesson, finishing "Someday We'll All Be Free" within one hour. The release of the song lasted for nearly a day, when it was deleted from West's Instagram before he was banned. Multiple news reporters analyzed and condemned "Someday We'll All Be Free" upon its release, seeing it as another antisemitic statement from West and a mockery towards people offended by his statements.

== Background and recording ==
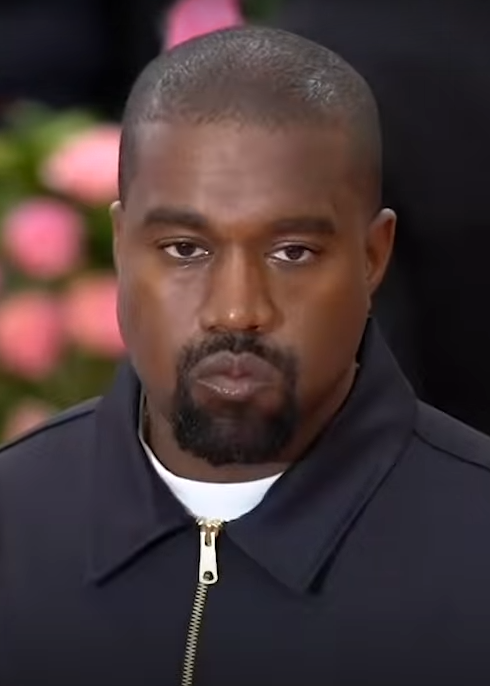
West's antisemitic remarks from October–December 2022 received condemnation, which inspired "Someday We'll All Be Free".

On October 8, 2022, West tweeted that he was going "going death con 3" [sic] on Jewish people after Instagram locked his account due to a post suggesting Sean Combs was controlled by Jews. The tweet was widely condemned as antisemitic, and West's Twitter account was temporarily locked. After the neo-Nazi Goyim Defense League held a protest on October 22 that included hanging a banner that read "Kanye is right about the Jews" while giving Nazi salutes, Jewish advocacy groups and politicians urged West's business collaborators and sponsors to cut ties with him. West's collaborations and sponsorships with Vogue, Universal Music Group, CAA, Balenciaga, Gap, and Adidas were subsequently terminated. On December 1, West made an appearance on Alex Jones's Infowars show, praising Adolf Hitler and stating there were "a lot of things that I love about Hitler; a lot of things".

According to American author Shane Cashman, West created "Someday We'll All Be Free" with producer John Cunningham during a studio session on December 4, 2022. West asked Cunningham to loop a section of the 1973 song of the same name by Donny Hathaway, and after Cunningham tweaked the loop, West began freestyling ideas over it. West wrote lyrics on his iPhone, hummed along to the song, and tweaked the drum's frequencies after putting on the first Star Wars film on the studio's TV, finishing the song in roughly one hour after a few vocal takes. After finishing it, he told Cunningham to begin a new track that sampled West's song "God Is" from Jesus Is King (2019), with West singing "This is my eternal soul" being looped over added piano from Cunningham. Later in the day, West hosted a listening party with "finished" and "unfinished" songs where "Someday We'll All Be Free" was played with the Star Wars film still playing in the background, syncing up with the scene of the Death Star being destroyed. West left the building at around 9 p.m., though made Cashman and Cunningham stay late so that Cashman could write lyrics for West's unfinished vocals on the "God Is"-sampling track.

== Composition and lyrics ==
"Someday We'll All Be Free"
A 12-second sample of "Someday We'll All Be Free", featuring a looped sample of the Donny Hathaway song of the same name, where West accuses the people who condemn him as being "Karens".

Musically, "Someday We'll All Be Free" is based around a sample of Hathaway's song with added drums. While talking to Cashman, Cunningham remarked that "[l]istening to loops made [him] successful," calling repetition "important, [as] you hear something new each time." The Hathaway sample contrasts the song's lyrics, as his song is considered a Civil Rights movement anthem that opposed the white supremacist ideology West began affiliating with; Andre Gee of Rolling Stone described the usage as "an abhorrent subversion".

In the lyrics of "Someday We'll All Be Free", West addresses his controversies from October–December 2022, starting with the White Lives Matter shirt he wore during Yeezy Season 9 on October 3. West's lyrics have been described as "vague" and characterzied as him venting about his situation. The first verse opens with West rapping that he has been waking up to people texting him "I can't do this anymore", followed by flexes about his perceived superiority to others. West refers to those condemning him and his statements as Karens, claiming that they merely pretend to care about antisemitism and are not giving him "a fair hand". A more direct reference to West's actions is rapped in the second verse, with the line "Tweeted 'death con', now we past three" being repeated twice. The outro samples West's interview with Alex Jones, where Jones asked "Can we just kind of say, like, you like the uniforms but that's about it?" before West responded with "No, there's a lot of things that I love about Hitler". The song cuts off the words "about Hitler" and instead loops the phrase "that I love...". It originally included West saying "about Hitler" when created in the session with Cunningham, but West later told him to remove it.

== Release and reception ==
"Someday We'll All Be Free" was released on the night of December 7, 2022. It was exclusively released onto West's Instagram account and the Infowars website as part of West's promise to stop releasing music onto streaming platforms. West's post on the former included the caption "Censori overload. The variable epitope library from the antigen promotes an immune response in the body", with intentional misspelling of the phrase "sensory overload" being in reference to his wife, Bianca Censori. West did not originally give the song a name, so the names "Someday We'll All Be Free" and "Censori Overload" were used interchangeably online, with most media outlets using the former. The official lyrics were posted to Instagram the same day, which slightly differ from those heard in the original post. The track was deleted from West's Instagram on December 8 shortly before his account was re-banned, but was ripped and reuploaded by a YouTube user the same day.

Gee described the song's lyrics as "a double-down on the conservative, antisemetic [sic] rhetoric Ye's been expressing in recent months". He felt that West had tired the public with his opinions, as his "knack for stirring soul samples and baring his honesty hasn't gone anywhere, but many people's tolerance to hear it is long gone." Mxdwn Music's Federico Cardenas said the Infowars sample was "seemingly mocking those offended by his anti-Semitic [sic] remarks".

== Personnel ==
Credits are adapted from Cashman: The Case for President Ye (Part II).

- Kanye West – vocals, songwriting, mixing
- John Cunningham – production, recording engineer
