= Live (Donny Hathaway album) =

Live album by Donny Hathaway
- Released: February 1972
- Recorded: August 24–30, 1971 at The Troubadour in Hollywood; October 7, 1971 The Bitter End in New York
- Genre: Deep soul
- Length: 52:39
- Label: Atlantic
- Producers: Arif Mardin (side one); Jerry Wexler & Arif Mardin (side two)

Donny Hathaway chronology
Donny Hathaway (1971)	Live (1972)	Come Back, Charleston Blue (1972)

Live is a 1972 live album by American soul artist Donny Hathaway. It was recorded at two concerts: side one at The Troubadour in Hollywood, and side two at The Bitter End in Greenwich Village, Manhattan based on the guidance of Jerry Wexler.

The album features some traditional soul anthems, such as Marvin Gaye's 1971 hit "What's Going On", but also Carole King's pop standard "You've Got a Friend".

There are two notable solos on the album, one on the track "The Ghetto" by Hathaway on electric piano and another by Willie Weeks on bass on "Voices Inside (Everything Is Everything)", taken from the performances recorded at The Troubadour and at The Bitter End, respectively.

Hathaway's daughter Lalah would record her own live album in 2015 in which she also did "Little Ghetto Boy".

== Critical reception ==
Professional ratings
Review scores
Source	Rating
AllMusic	4.5/5 stars
Rolling Stone	(favorable)

The album received generally positive reviews from music critics. Rolling Stone's Mosi Reeves stated "Donny Hathaway swings with vividness on this brilliant live set and the audience responds ecstatically." AllMusic rated the album score of 4.5 out of 5, with John Bush stating the album is "one of the most glorious of his career, an uncomplicated, energetic set with a heavy focus on audience response as well as the potent jazz chops of his group", and that it "solidified Hathaway's importance at the forefront of soul music". In 2015, Live was ranked number 48 on Rolling Stone's list of 50 Greatest Live Albums of All Time. In 2005, Victor Wooten included it in his list of the 10 essential bass albums.

== Track listing ==
=== Side one ===
1. "What's Goin' On" (Renaldo "Obie" Benson, Al Cleveland, Marvin Gaye) – 5:18
2. "The Ghetto" (Donny Hathaway, Leroy Hutson) – 12:08
3. "Hey Girl" (Earl DeRouen) – 4:03
4. "You've Got a Friend" (Carole King) – 4:34

=== Side two ===
1. "Little Ghetto Boy" (DeRouen, Edward Howard) – 4:29
2. "We're Still Friends" (Hathaway, Glenn Watts) – 5:12
3. "Jealous Guy" (John Lennon) – 3:08
4. "Voices Inside (Everything Is Everything)" (Richard Evans, Philip Upchurch, Ric Powell) – 13:47

== Personnel ==
- Donny Hathaway – vocals, electric piano, piano, organ, arrangements
- Phil Upchurch – lead guitar on side one
- Cornell Dupree – lead guitar, backing vocals on side two
- Mike Howard – guitar, backing vocals
- Willie Weeks – bass, backing vocals
- Fred White – drums, backing vocals
- Earl DeRouen – conga drums, backing vocals

Technical

- Ray Thompson – recording engineer on side one
- Tom Flye – recording engineer on side two
- Arif Mardin – mixing
- Jim Cummins – front cover photography

== Charts ==
Chart (1972)	Peak position
US Billboard Top LPs	18
US Billboard Top Soul LPs	4
