= Solar Wind (album) =

Studio album by Ramsey Lewis
- Released: 1974
- Recorded: 1974
- Studio: Trans Maximus Inc. Recording Studios, Memphis; CBS Recording Studios, Chicago
- Genre: Jazz
- Length: 43:19
- Label: Columbia; KC 32897
- Producer: Steve Cropper, Ramsey Lewis, Cleveland Eaton

Ramsey Lewis chronology
Ramsey Lewis' Newly Recorded All-Time Non-Stop Golden Hits (1973)	Solar Wind (1974)	Sun Goddess (1974)

Solar Wind is an album by pianist Ramsey Lewis released in 1974 on Columbia Records. Produced by Steve Cropper of Booker T and the MGs, Ramsey Lewis, and Cleveland Eaton, the album was recorded in Memphis and Chicago. The album peaked at No. 29 on the US Billboard Top Jazz LPs chart.

== Reception ==
Professional ratings
Review scores
Source	Rating
AllMusic	2/5 stars

AllMusic awarded the album 2 out of 5 stars.

== Track listing ==
1. "Sweet and Tender You" (Steve Cropper, Carl Marsh) - 5:47
2. "Hummingbird" (Jim Seals, Dash Crofts) - 4:52
3. "Solar Wind" (Cropper, Marsh) - 3:15
4. "Jamaican Marketplace" (Cleveland Eaton, Ramsey Lewis) - 7:16
5. "The Everywhere Calypso" (Sonny Rollins) - 2:59
6. "Summer Breeze" (Seals, Crofts) - 4:51
7. "Loves Me Like a Rock" (Paul Simon) - 4:30
8. "Come Down in Time" (Elton John, Bernie Taupin) - 4:53
9. "Love For a Day" (Cropper, Carl Marsh) - 4:56
- Recorded at Trans Maximus Inc. Recording Studios, Memphis (tracks 1, 7 & 9) and CBS Recording Studios, Chicago (tracks 2–6 & 8)

== Personnel ==
- Ramsey Lewis – keyboards, ARP, Moog
- Cleveland Eaton – bass, electric bass
- Morris Jennings – drums, percussion
- James L. Herson – Moog (tracks 2, 6 & 8)
- Calvin Barnes – percussion (tracks 4 & 5)
- Carl Marsh, Ron Capone – drums (track 3)
- Steve Cropper – guitar (tracks 1, 3, 7 & 9)
