= Everything Is Everything (Donny Hathaway album) =

Studio album by Donny Hathaway
- Released: July 1, 1970
- Recorded: September 11, 1969 – April 16, 1970
- Genre: Soul
- Length: 41:33
- Label: Atco
- Producers: Donny Hathaway; Ric Powell

Donny Hathaway chronology
Everything Is Everything (1970)	Donny Hathaway (1971)

Professional ratings
Review scores
Source	Rating
AllMusic	4.5/5 stars
The Rolling Stone Album Guide	4.5/5 stars

Everything Is Everything is the debut studio album by American soul artist Donny Hathaway, which was released on July 1, 1970, on the Atlantic Records' subsidiary, Atco.

The album was Hathaway's first release after being signed to Atlantic in 1969. Hathaway had already built a reputation early in his life, first as a gospel singer as a child under the name Donny Pitts. Raised in St. Louis, with religious influences, his grandmother Martha Crumwell was herself an accomplished gospel singer and guitarist. After dropping out of Howard University in 1967, Hathaway moved to Chicago, his birthplace, and started working on music for Curtis Mayfield's Curtom Records label where he was a songwriter, producer, arranger, composer, conductor and session player.

Everything Is Everything was produced by Hathaway and Ric Powell, who plays drums and percussion on the album; Hathaway wrote or co-wrote five of the album's nine songs. Hathaway had met Powell while at Howard University, as well as the future Impressions lead singer, Leroy Hutson, who jointly wrote the hit song that would eventually make it on the album, "The Ghetto". The track was mostly an instrumental, except for Hathaway's vocal ad-libs and his singing of the chorus. Hathaway and Hutson composed another socially conscious song for the album, titled "Tryin' Times". Other songs were split between covers (Ray Charles's "I Believe to My Soul" and Nina Simone's "To Be Young, Gifted and Black"), spiritual affairs ("Thank You Master for My Soul") and love songs ("Je Vous Aime (I Love You)").

Released in July 1970, the album peaked at No. 73 on the Billboard Top 200 Albums chart and No. 33 on the Billboard R&B Albums chart.

Critics have since called Hathaway's debut his finest album. Joel Dorn wrote that the album was the artist's best and that it had, "a certain innocence to it. Afterwards, he was a genius, but right then, he was just another guy tryin'." It would be one of four solo studio albums, including the soundtrack for Come Back, Charleston Blue, that Hathaway released in his lifetime.

== Track listing ==
=== Side one ===
1. "Voices Inside (Everything Is Everything)" (Richard Evans, Ric Powell, Phil Upchurch) – 3:28 - _{'especially dedicated to Herb Kent of WVON' - according to Ric Powell}
2. "Je Vous Aime (I Love You)" (Donny Hathaway, Leroy Hutson, Edward Kennedy) – 3:31 - _{'dedicated to Mrs. Eulaulah Hathaway, Donny's wife and the background voice in addition to the three parts that Donny sang himself to create the background voices'}
3. "I Believe to My Soul" (Ray Charles) – 3:51
4. "Misty" (Johnny Burke, Erroll Garner) – 3:38
5. "Sugar Lee" (Hathaway, Powell) – 4:05
6. "Tryin' Times" (Hathaway, Hutson) – 3:15 - _{' a message song already recorded by both Roberta Flack and "Pops" Staples}

=== Side two ===
7. "Thank You Master (For My Soul)" (Hathaway) – 5:50
8. "The Ghetto" (Hathaway, Hutson) – 6:50
9. "To Be Young, Gifted and Black" (Weldon Irvine, Nina Simone) – 6:43 _{'to the proud and defiant lyrics of Nina Simone's tribute to Lorraine Hansberry, Donny has added a new message - a lament for the many young, gifted and blacks who are trapped by lack of opportunity'- Ric Powell}

Bonus track on CD reissue

10. "A Dream" (Robert Ayers, Hathaway) – 4:14

== Personnel ==
- Donny Hathaway – lead vocals (All tracks), background vocals (tracks 1–8), pianos (including electric) (All tracks), organ (track 9), additional bass (8), keyboard bass (9), arranger, conductor
- Willie Weeks – bass (track 1)
- Master Henry Gibson – conga (track 8)
- King Curtis – guitar (track 3)
- Phil Upchurch – bass guitar (3–4, 6–7), guitar (1–4, 6–8)
- John Littlejohn – guitar, vocals
- John Avant – trombone
- Johnny Board – tenor saxophone
- Lenard Druss – tenor saxophone
- Oscar Brashear – trumpet
- Clifford P. Davis – alto saxophone
- Aaron Dodd – tuba
- Morris Ellis – trombone
- Marshall Hawkins – bass (tracks 5, 8)
- Willie Henderson – baritone saxophone
- John Howell – trumpet
- Morris Jennings – drums (tracks 1–4, 6–8)
- Robert A. Lewis – trumpet
- Cyril Touff – bass trumpet
- John Lounsberry – French horn
- Ethel Merker – French horn
- Paul A. Teryett – French horn
- Don Myrick – alto saxophone
- Ric Powell – drums (tracks 5, 9), percussion (1–4, 6–8)
- Louis Satterfield – bass (tracks 1–3)
- The Vashonettes – backing vocals (track 9)

Technical

- Murray Allen, Roger Anfinsen – recording engineer
- Haig Adishian – cover design
- Jim Taylor – cover photography

"Donny Hathaway and Atco Records would like to thank Dave Franklin and Eleanor Steele for their gracious assistance in the preparation of this album"
