= Feeling Blue =

Studio album by Phil Upchurch
- Released: 1968
- Recorded: September 12 & 13, 1967
- Studios: Plaza Sound Studios, New York City
- Genre: Jazz
- Length: 38:58
- Labels: Milestone; MSP 9010
- Producer: Orrin Keepnews

Phil Upchurch chronology
The Big Hit Dances (1962)	Feeling Blue (1968)	Upchurch (1969)

Feeling Blue is an album by jazz and R&B guitarist Phil Upchurch recorded in 1967 and released on the Milestone label.

== Reception ==
Professional ratings
Review scores
Source	Rating
Allmusic	3.5/5 stars

Allmusic reviewed the album awarding it 3½ stars stating "There is more than the seed of genius at work on Feelin' Blue. These ten cuts were recorded over two days in September and October with two different ensembles... fine as it is, Feeling Blue was only a hint of the great things to come". All About Jazz correspondent David Rickert observed "Feeling Blue is a great jazz guitar record that, while flawed, displays a musician of considerable talent".

== Track listing ==
All compositions by Phil Upchurch except as indicated

1. "Feeling Blue" – 3:10
2. "Stop and Listen" (Ritchie Adams, J. J. Woods) – 2:49
3. "Corcovado (Quiet Nights of Quiet Stars)" (Antônio Carlos Jobim) – 4:10
4. "Really Sincere" – 4:51
5. "Tangerine" (Johnny Mercer, Victor Schertzinger) – 3:36
6. "Up, Up and Away" (Jimmy Webb) – 2:41
7. "Israel" (John Carisi) – 4:00
8. "Sabaceous Lament" – 4:20
9. "Muscle Soul" (Leonard Brown) – 2:45
10. "I Want a Little Girl" (Murray Mencher, Billy Moll) – 6:31

== Personnel ==
- Phil Upchurch – guitar
- Wallace Davenport – trumpet (tracks 1, 2, 5, 6 & 9)
- Eddie Pazant – alto saxophone (tracks 1, 2, 5, 6 & 9)
- John Gilmore – tenor saxophone (tracks 1, 2, 5, 6 & 9)
- Pat Patrick – baritone saxophone (tracks 1, 2, 5, 6 & 9)
- Wynton Kelly – piano (tracks 3, 4, 7, 8 & 10)
- Al Williams – piano, celeste (tracks 1, 2, 5, 6 & 9)
- Richard Davis – bass (tracks 3, 4, 7, 8 & 10)
- Chuck Rainey – electric bass (tracks 1, 2, 5, 6 & 9)
- Jimmy Cobb (tracks 3, 4, 7, 8 & 10), Bernard Purdie (tracks 1, 2, 5, 6 & 9) – drums
- Roger "Montego Joe" Sanders – congas (tracks 3, 4, 7, 8 & 10)
- Warren Smith – congas, vibraharp (tracks 1, 2, 5, 6 & 9)
- Ed Bland - arranger, conductor
