= Turn You to Love =

Studio album by Terry Callier
- Released: 1979
- Genre: Rhythm and blues
- Length: 38:20
- Language: English
- Label: Elektra
- Producer: Reginald “Sonny” Burke

Terry Callier chronology
Fire on Ice (1978)	Turn You to Love (1979)	Time Peace (1998)

Turn You to Love is a studio album from American musician Terry Callier. Released by Elektra Records in 1979, this is the artist's sixth album and the second with Elektra. It has received mixed critical reception.

== Critical reception ==
Professional ratings
Review scores
Source	Rating
AllMusic	4/5 stars
Pitchfork	5.5/10

Writing for Pitchfork, Andy Beta praised Callier's vocals and noted that "he could've been a distinct R&B personality had the breaks gone his way". AllMusic reviewer Thom Jurek declared it "easily Terry Callier's most underrated album" after the "miss" that was Fire on Ice.

== Track listing ==
1. "Sign of the Times" (Terry Callier and Larry Wade) – 5:00
2. "Pyramids of Love" (Wade) – 3:42
3. "Turn You to Love" (Callier and Wade) – 3:46
4. "Do It Again" (Walter Becker and Donald Fagen) – 4:52
5. "Ordinary Joe" (Callier) – 4:54
6. "Occasional Rain" (Callier) – 3:49
7. "Still Water (Love)" (Smokey Robinson and Frank Wilson) – 3:48
8. "You and Me (Will Always Be in Love)" (Callier and Wade) – 4:21
9. "A Mother's Love" (Callier, Earl Johnson, and Wade) – 3:44

== Personnel ==
- Terry Callier – guitar, vocals

Additional musicians

- Michael Boddicker – synthesizer
- Oscar Brashear – trumpet
- Oliver C. Brown, Jr. – percussion
- Keni Burke – bass guitar on all tracks, except "Ordinary Joe"
- Reginald “Sonny” Burke – keyboards, synthesizer, arrangement, conducting, production
- James Gadson – membranophone
- William Green – saxophone
- Elizabeth Howard – backing vocals
- James Jamerson – bass guitar on "Ordinary Joe"
- Barbara Korn – French horn
- Gayle Levant – harp
- Steve Madaio – trumpet
- Arthur Maebe – French horn
- James "Alibe" Sledge – backing vocals
- Patricia Henley Talbert – backing vocals
- Tommy Tedesco – guitar, mandolin
- Earl Van Dyke – keyboards
- Larry Wade – guitar
- David T. Walker – guitar
- Melvin “Wah Wah” Watson – guitar
- Ernie Watts – saxophone
- Fred Wesley – trombone
- Robert White – guitar

Technical personnel

- Samuel F. Brown III – orchestration
- Ron Coro – art direction
- Roger Dollarhide – engineering
- Mary Francis – design, illustration
- Laura Livingston – engineering
- Sye Mitchell – engineering
- Don Mizell – executive production
- Jimmy Schifflett – engineering
