= Them Changes (Ramsey Lewis album) =

Live album by Ramsey Lewis
- Released: September 1970
- Recorded: May 8 & 9, 1970; The Depot, Minneapolis
- Genre: Jazz
- Labels: Cadet; LPS-844
- Producer: Ramsey Lewis

Ramsey Lewis chronology
The Piano Player (1969)	Them Changes (1970)	Back to the Roots (1970)

Them Changes is a live album by pianist Ramsey Lewis, released in 1970 on Cadet Records. The album peaked at No. 4 on the US Billboard Best Selling Jazz LPs and No. 34 on the US Billboard Best Selling Soul LP's charts.

== Reception ==
Professional ratings
Review scores
Source	Rating
AllMusic	2/5 stars

AllMusic gave a 2/5 stars rating of the album.

== Track listing ==
All compositions by Ramsey Lewis except as indicated

1. "Them Changes" (Buddy Miles) - 6:40
2. "Drown in My Own Tears" (Henry Glover) - 7:25
3. "Oh Happy Day" (Edwin Hawkins) - 7:10
4. "Do Whatever Sets You Free" - 7:53
5. "Something" (George Harrison) - 5:15
6. "See the End from the Beginning, Look Afar" (Lewis, Cleveland Eaton) - 6:15
7. "The Unsilent Minority" - 3:45

== Personnel ==
- Ramsey Lewis – piano, electric piano
- Phil Upchurch – electric guitar
- Cleveland Eaton – electric bass
- Morris Jennings – drums

== Charts ==
Chart	Peak position
US Billboard Best Selling Jazz LPs	4
US Billboard Best Selling Soul LP's	34
US Billboard Top LPs	157
