= Occasional Rain =

Studio album by Terry Callier
- Released: March 1972
- Recorded: 1971
- Studio: Ter Mar, Chicago, Illinois, US
- Genre: Soul; psychedelic folk; jazz
- Length: 42:01
- Label: Cadet
- Producer: Charles Stepney

Terry Callier chronology
The New Folk Sound of Terry Callier (1968)	Occasional Rain (1972)	What Color Is Love (1972)

Occasional Rain is a 1972 studio album from American musician Terry Callier. Released by Cadet Records, it is Callier's second album and the first in the trilogy that he recorded in short succession for Cadet with producer Charles Stepney. It has received positive critical reception.

== Critical reception ==
Professional ratings
Review scores
Source	Rating
AllMusic	4.5/5 stars
Pitchfork	9.0/10

Occasional Rain
A section of the song "Occasional Rain" that illustrates Callier's artistic move from acoustic textures into psychedelic. Howard Reich's obituary for Callier in The Chicago Tribune suggested that the artist's social commentary and unique instrumentation hampered his radio accessibility and limited his audience in spite of his talent.

AllMusic's Thom Jurek singled out several tracks for praise and summed up the album as "transcendent". In Pitchfork's introduction to psychedelic folk, Grayson Haver Currin notes this album and its title track in particular as must-hear songs to understand the genre.

== Track listing ==
All songs written by Terry Callier, except where noted.

1. "Segue #1 – Go Head On" – 0:38
2. "Ordinary Joe" – 4:19
3. "Golden Circle #317" – 3:33
4. "Segue #5 – Go Head On" – 0:38
5. "Trance on Sedgewick Street" – 6:17
6. "Do You Finally Need a Friend" (Callier, Charles "Chas" Jones, Larry Wade) – 5:42
7. "Segue #4 – Go Head On" – 0:38
8. "Sweet Edie-D" – 5:00
9. "Occasional Rain" – 4:03
10. "Segue #2 – Go Head On" – 0:38
11. "Blues for Marcus" – 3:29
12. "Lean On Me" – 6:28
13. "Last Segue – Go Head On" – 0:38

== Personnel ==
- Terry Callier – guitar, vocals
- Robert Crowder – drums
- Kitty Haywood – soprano vocals
- Earl Madison – cello on "Trance on Sedgewick Street" and "Blues for Marcus"
- Michael Mendel – art direction, photography
- Leonardo Pirani – piano
- Minnie Riperton – soprano vocals
- Sydney Simms – bass guitar
- Gary Starr – engineering
- Charles Stepney – harpsichord, organ, production
- Shirley Wahls – contralto vocals
