= Upchurch (album) =

Studio album by Phil Upchurch
- Released: 1969
- Recorded: March 1969
- Studio: Ter Mar Studios, Chicago, Illinois
- Genre: Jazz
- Length: 39:17
- Label: Cadet; LPS-826
- Producer: Charles Stepney

Phil Upchurch chronology
Feeling Blue (1967)	Upchurch (1969)	The Way I Feel (1970)

Upchurch is an album by jazz and R&B guitarist Phil Upchurch recorded in 1969 and released on the Cadet label.

== Reception ==
Professional ratings
Review scores
Source	Rating
Allmusic	2/5 stars

Allmusic awarded the album 2 stars.

== Track listing ==
All compositions by Phil Upchurch except as indicated

1. "Black Gold" (Charles Stepney) – 4:31
2. "America" (Paul Simon) – 3:30
3. "As You Said" (Jack Bruce, Pete Brown) – 2:31
4. "You Wouldn't, You Couldn't Be True" – 3:02
5. "Crosstown Traffic" (Jimi Hendrix) – 4:00
6. "Adam and Charlene" (Charles Stepney) – 4:19
7. "Spinning Wheel" (David Clayton-Thomas) – 3:28
8. "Voodoo Chile" (Jimi Hendrix) – 2:52
9. "More and More" (Don Juan Mancha, Vee Pea Smith) – 2:43
10. "Midnight Chile" – 4:09

== Personnel ==
- Phil Upchurch – guitar
- Donny Hathaway – piano
- Louis Satterfield – bass
- Morris Jennings – drums
- Bobby Christian – percussion
- James Mack Singers - vocals
- Charles Stepney – arranger and conductor
