= Giving Up =

Single by Gladys Knight & the Pips
- B-side: "Maybe Maybe Baby"
- Released: 1964
- Genre: Soul
- Length: 2:43
- Label: Maxx
- Songwriter: Van McCoy

"Giving Up" is a popular song written by Van McCoy that was introduced by Gladys Knight & the Pips with an April 1964 single release.

== Chart performance ==
"Giving Up" was a Top 40 Pop hit, reaching No. 38 on the Billboard Hot 100. and a Top 10 R&B hit, reaching No. 6 on the Billboard R&B singles chart. Gladys and her family group The Pips, (her brother Merald (Bubba), and their cousins, Ed Patten, and William Guest, later recorded a newer version of the song after being signed by Motown, which was released on their "Greatest Hits" album and Anthology on Motown's "Soul" subsidiary label several years later.

== Other recordings ==
"Giving Up" has inspired cover versions by many artists:

- A 1969 cover of the song by the Ad Libs that peaked at No. 34 on the US R&B chart. Van McCoy produced the track.
- Donny Hathaway remade "Giving Up" for his 1971 self-titled album for which it served as lead single reaching No. 21 R&B in the summer of 1972. Hathaway's version crossed over to the pop chart, peaking at No. 81 on the Billboard Hot 100.
- Zulema included a version on her 1973 album Ms. Z.
- Lonette McKee performs a version of “Giving Up” as troubled nightclub singer Sister in 1976's Sparkle.
  - In 2000, Aaliyah remade "Giving Up" as an intended audition for the title role of Sparkle in the remake of the 1976 film, which was being produced by Whitney Houston.
- Jennifer Holliday recorded the song as "Givin' Up" on her 1987 album Get Close to My Love, which was later featured on the soundtrack to the 2007 Tyler Perry motion picture Why Did I Get Married?
