= Funky Serenity =

Studio album by Ramsey Lewis
- Released: January 30, 1973
- Recorded: October 1972
- Genre: Jazz
- Length: 48:07
- Label: Columbia; KC 32030
- Producer: Ramsey Lewis

Ramsey Lewis chronology
Upendo Ni Pamoja (1972)	Funky Serenity (1973)	Ramsey Lewis' Newly Recorded All-Time Non-Stop Golden Hits (1973)

Funky Serenity is an album by the pianist Ramsey Lewis, released in 1973 on Columbia Records. The album reached No. 6 on the Billboard Jazz Albums chart.

== Reception ==
Professional ratings
Review scores
Source	Rating
AllMusic	4/5 stars
The Penguin Guide to Jazz Recordings	2/4 stars

Andrew Hamilton of AllMusic called the album "enjoyable and essential".

== Track listing ==
All compositions by Cleveland Eaton, Morris Jennings and Ramsey Lewis except as indicated

1. "Kufanya Mapenzi (Making Love)" (Eddie Green) - 5:17
2. "(If Loving You Is Wrong) I Don't Want to Be Right" (Homer Banks, Carl Hampton, Raymond Jackson) – 5:24
3. "What It Is!" – 2:41
4. "My Love for You" (Green) – 5:14
5. "Nights in White Satin" (Justin Hayward) – 5:36
6. "Serene Funk" – 4:11
7. "Dreams" – 9:39
8. "Betcha by Golly, Wow" (Thom Bell, Linda Creed) – 5:09
9. "Where Is the Love" (Ralph MacDonald, William Salter) – 4:56

== Personnel ==
- Ramsey Lewis – piano, electric piano, harpsichord
- Cleveland Eaton – bass, electric bass, percussion
- Morris Jennings – drums, congas, percussion
- Ed Green – percussion, violin
