= Mr. Oscar Brown Jr. Goes to Washington =

Live album by Oscar Brown Jr.
- Released: 1965
- Recorded: July 1965
- Venue: The Cellar Door, Washington D.C.
- Genre: Vocal jazz
- Length: 45:22
- Label: Fontana
- Producer: Luchi DeJesus

Oscar Brown Jr. chronology
In a New Mood (1963)	Mr. Oscar Brown Jr. Goes to Washington (1965)	Finding a New Friend (1966)

Professional ratings
Review scores
Source	Rating
AllMusic	4/5 stars

Mr. Oscar Brown Jr. Goes to Washington is a 1965 live album by vocalist Oscar Brown Jr., recorded at The Cellar Door in Washington D.C.

== Track listing ==
All tracks composed by Oscar Brown; except where noted.

1. "One Life" – 3:14
2. "Beautiful Girl" – 3:15
3. "Maxine" – 2:50
4. "Maggie" – 3:01
5. "Living Double in a World of Trouble" – 3:29
6. "Glorious Tired Feeling" – 2:43
7. "Tower of Time" – 3:27
8. "Muffled Drums" – 3:43
9. "Brother, Where Are You" – 4:09
10. "Forty Acres and a Mule" – 3:33
11. "Call of the City" – 2:53
12. "Summer in the City" (Curtis Norman, Oscar Brown Jr.) – 3:27
13. "Brother, Where Are You" – 5:38

== Personnel ==
- Oscar Brown Jr. – vocals
- Floyd Morris – piano, arrangements
- Phil Upchurch – guitar
- Herbert Brown – double bass
- Curtis Boyd – drums
