= The New Folk Sound of Terry Callier =

1968 folk and soul album by Terry Callier

Studio album by Terry Callier
- Released: 1968
- Recorded: July 29, 1964
- Studio: Webb Recording, Chicago, Illinois, U. S.
- Genre: Folk; soul
- Length: 37:41
- Language: English
- Label: Prestige
- Producer: Samuel Charters

Terry Callier chronology
The New Folk Sound of Terry Callier (1968)	Occasional Rain (1972)

The New Folk Sound of Terry Callier is the 1968 debut album from American folk and soul performer Terry Callier, released on Prestige Records.

== Recording and release ==
Callier started recording as a teenager for Chess Records in 1962 but did not record an album for the first two years he was a professional musician. The album was recorded by Samuel Charters, who courted Callier to come to Prestige in 1964 but after the sessions, he ran off to Mexico, delaying the actual album release from 1965 to 1968. Callier did not even know the album was released until his brother saw it for sale in a book store. Craft Recordings released a 50th anniversary edition on November 2, 2018.

== Critical reception ==
The editorial staff of AllMusic Guide gave the release four out of five stars, with Jason Ankeny writing that the album is not Callier's best but "it's his most timeless and inviting". Remarking on the 50th anniversary edition, Charles Donovan of PopMatters calls the original "a terrific album" and the re-release "stunning".

== Track listing ==
All songs are traditional compositions, except where noted

1. "900 Miles" – 5:05
2. "Oh Dear, What Can the Matter Be" – 2:50
3. "Johnny Be Gay If You Can Be" – 4:20
4. "Cotton Eyed Joe" – 5:25
5. "It's About Time" (Rent Foreman, Lydia Wood) – 3:25
6. "Promenade in Green" – 4:00
7. "Spin, Spin, Spin" (Foreman) – 3:05
8. "I'm a Drifter" (Travis Edmonson) – 8:50

2018 bonus tracks

9. "Jack O’Diamonds"
10. "Golden Apples of the Sun"
11. "Promenade in Green" (Take 1)
12. "Be My Woman" (Take 1)
13. "900 Miles" (Take 1)
14. "It’s About Time" (Take 2)
15. "Oh Dear, What Can the Matter Be" (Take 2)

== Personnel ==
- Terry Callier – guitar, vocals
- Terbour Attenborough – upright bass
- Paul Blakemore – mastering on anniversary edition
- Samuel Charters – production
- Ray Flerlage – photography
- Rent Foreman – liner notes
- Ryan Jebavy – editing on anniversary edition
- Sage LaMonica – design on anniversary edition
- Chris Popham – design
- Don Schlitten – design
- John Tweedle – upright bass
- Jason P. Woodbury – liner notes in anniversary edition
- Mason Williams – production on anniversary edition
