= Donny Hathaway (album) =

Studio album by Donny Hathaway
- Released: April 2, 1971
- Recorded: 1970–71
- Studios: Atlantic (New York); Criteria (Miami); Universal (Chicago)
- Genre: Soul
- Length: 44:46
- Labels: Atco; 33-360
- Producers: Jerry Wexler; Arif Mardin; Donny Hathaway

Donny Hathaway chronology
Everything Is Everything (1970)	Donny Hathaway (1971)	Live (1972)

Professional ratings
Review scores
Source	Rating
Allmusic	3/5 stars
Rolling Stone	(favorable)
The Village Voice	D−

Donny Hathaway is the second studio album by American soul artist Donny Hathaway, released on April 2, 1971, on Atco.

The majority of songs featured on the collection were covers of pop, gospel and soul songs that were released around the same time. The most prominent of the covers were Hathaway's rendition of Leon Russell's "A Song for You" and a gospel-inflected cover of Gladys Knight & the Pips' "Giving Up", written by Van McCoy. This was the second of three solo studio albums that Hathaway released during his lifetime before his suicide in 1979. Atlantic producer Jerry Wexler took over most of the production duties, with Hathaway producing one track, the self-penned "Take a Love Song".

== Critical reception ==
Bob Talbert of the Detroit Free Press declared, "This blues singer and R&B artist in the Ray Charles vein, comes on heavy with strings and things."

John Bush of Allmusic in a 3/5 stars review, declared "With just one exception, Donny Hathaway's second full-length is a covers album, featuring one of the most pop-averse artists in soul music surprisingly offering interpretations of contemporary hit material...Still, whereas Everything Is Everything saw him leading the choir up in the front of church, Donny Hathaway sounds like the lament of a man alone in the sanctuary after services are finished."

== Track listing ==
1. "Giving Up" (Van McCoy) (6:20)
2. "A Song for You" (Leon Russell) (5:25)
3. "Little Girl" (Billy Preston) (4:47)
4. "He Ain't Heavy, He's My Brother" (Bob Russell, Bobby Scott) (5:55)
5. "Magnificent Sanctuary Band" (Dorsey Burnette) (4:24)
6. "She Is My Lady" (George S. Clinton) (5:33)
7. "I Believe in Music" (Mac Davis) (3:38)
8. "Take a Love Song" (Hathaway, Nadine McKinnor) (4:53)
9. "Put Your Hand in the Hand" (Gene MacLellan) (3:49)

=== Bonus tracks on CD ===
1. "Be There" (Donny Hathaway, Charles Ostiguy) (3:02)
2. "This Christmas" (Hathaway, Nadine McKinnor) (3:51)

== Personnel ==
- Donny Hathaway – lead vocals, keyboards (all tracks)
- Myrna Summers – background vocals (tracks 1–7, 9)
- Sammy Turner – background vocals (tracks 1–7, 9)
- King Curtis – tenor saxophone solo (track 1)
- Joe Newman – trumpet solo (track 6)
- Chuck Rainey – all bass guitar (tracks 1–7, 9)
- Phil Upchurch – electric bass guitar (8)
- J.R. Bailey – background vocals (tracks 1–7, 9)
- John Littlejohn – guitar, vocals
- Cissy Houston – background vocals (tracks 1–7, 9)
- Judy Clay – background vocals (tracks 1–7, 9)
- Cornell Dupree – guitar (tracks 1–7, 9)
- Interdenominational singers – background vocals (tracks 1–7, 9)
- Jack Jennings – percussion (all tracks)
- Al Jackson Jr. – drums (tracks 1–7, 9)
- Morris Jennings – drums (track 8)
- Steve Novosel – additional bass guitar (track 8)
- Sylvia Shemwell – background vocals (tracks 1–7, 9)
- Myrna Smith – background vocals (tracks 1–7, 9)
- Ivory Stone – background vocals (track 8)
- Deirdre Tuck Corley – background vocals (tracks 1–7, 9)
- Lillian Tynes – background vocals (track 8)
- Ronnie Bright – background vocals (tracks 1–7, 9)
- Arif Mardin, Donny Hathaway – string, horn and choral arrangements

Technical

- Howard Albert, Murray Allen, Ron Albert, Gene Paul, Jimmy Douglass – engineer
- Loring Eutemey – cover
- Michael Woodlon – cover photography
