= Extension of a Man =

Studio album by Donny Hathaway
- Released: June 18, 1973
- Recorded: October 11, 1971 – November 26, 1972
- Studios: A & R (New York City); Bell Sound (New York City); Regent Sound; Atlantic (New York City); Universal (Chicago)
- Genres: Progressive soul, R&B
- Length: 47:33
- Labels: Atco; 7029
- Producer: Arif Mardin

Donny Hathaway chronology
Roberta Flack & Donny Hathaway (1972)	Extension of a Man (1973)	In Performance (1980)

Singles from Extension of a Man
- 1. "Love, Love, Love" Released: 1973; 2. "Come Little Children" Released: 1974

Professional ratings
Review scores
Source	Rating
AllMusic	4/5 stars
MusicHound	4.5/5 stars
Rolling Stone	(favorable)

Extension of a Man is the final studio album released by the R&B/soul singer Donny Hathaway on Atco Records in 1973.

The release was his last solo studio album. It is noted for including a young Stanley Clarke of Return to Forever on a couple of tracks, as well as drummer Fred White, brother of Earth, Wind & Fire's Maurice White, who worked with Hathaway in Chicago in the early days. White also played with Hathaway on concert dates and is featured on Hathaway's live performance recordings.

== Track listing ==
All tracks composed by Donny Hathaway; except where indicated

1. "I Love the Lord; He Heard My Cry (Parts I & II)" - 5:32
2. "Someday We'll All Be Free" (Hathaway, Edward Howard) - 4:14
3. "Flying Easy" - 3:13
4. "Valdez in the Country" - 3:33
5. "I Love You More Than You'll Ever Know" (Al Kooper) - 5:23
6. "Come Little Children" - 4:35
7. "Love, Love, Love" (J.R. Bailey, Ken Williams) - 3:25
8. "The Slums" - 5:11
9. "Magdalena" (Danny O'Keefe) - 3:08
10. "I Know It's You" (Leon Ware) - 5:13
11. "Lord Help Me" (Joe Greene, Billy Preston) - 4:06

"Lord Help Me" was originally only released as a B-side to the single "I Love You More Than You'll Ever Know". It did not feature on Extension of a Man until the 1993 Compact Disc re-release. The song features Billy Preston. Also, it is the only track produced by Jerry Wexler, with fellow Atlantic producer Arif Mardin taking over production duties.

The opening instrumental track pays homage to the melody of "Here Comes De Honey Man" from The Gershwins' Porgy and Bess.

== Personnel ==
- Donny Hathaway – lead vocals (tracks 2–10), Fender Rhodes electric piano (1–9), all pianos (6–7, 9–10), Hammond organ (5), bass guitar (6), keyboards (11), arrangements
- Cornell Dupree (tracks 2–5, 7, electric - 8), David Spinozza (2–3, 10), Keith Loving (3–4, 7, acoustic - 8), John Bishop (6), Phil Upchurch (6) – guitar & guitar solo
- Grady Tate (tracks 1, 9), Fred White (5–6), Rick Marotta (10), Ray Lucas (2–4, 7–8) – drums
- Willie Weeks (tracks 2–5, 7–8), Russ Savakus (1), Stanley Clarke (1, 10), Gordon Edwards (9) – bass guitar
- Hugh McCracken – banjo (track 9), guitar (5, 9)
- Ralph MacDonald – percussion (tracks 3–4, 7, 9)
- David Newman – saxophone (track 5)
- Hubert Laws – flute (track 1)
- Marvin Stamm (tracks 1–2, 8–9), Joe Newman (1, 6), Ernie Royal (1) – trumpet
- Dominick Gravine (track 1), Garnett Brown (1), Paul Faulise (1), Wayne Andre (1), Tony Studd (8–9), Garnett Brown (6) – trombone
- Don Butterfield – tuba (tracks 1, 8–9)
- Phil Bodner – clarinet (track 9), alto saxophone (8)
- Seldon Powell – clarinet (tracks 6, 9), reeds (1), tenor saxophone (8)
- Vincent Abato – clarinet (track 1)
- Romeo Penque, William Slapin – reeds (track 1)
- Charles McCracken, George Ricci, Kermit Moore – cello (track 1)
- Jim Buffington, Julius Watkins, Tony Miranda – French horn (track 1)
- Emanuel Green, Harry Lookofsky, Julien Barber, Noel DaCosta, Sanford Allen, Theodore Israel – violin (track 1)
- Gloria Agostini – harp (track 1)
- Henry Schuman – oboe (track 1)
- Cissy Houston (track 10), Myrna Smith (10), Sylvia Shemwell (10), Jimmy Douglass (8), Mario "Big M" Medious (8), Richard Wells (8), William "Mac" McCollum (8) – backing vocals
- Myrna Summers & The Interdenominational Singers – choir (tracks 1, 7–8)
