= Terry Callier =

American musician

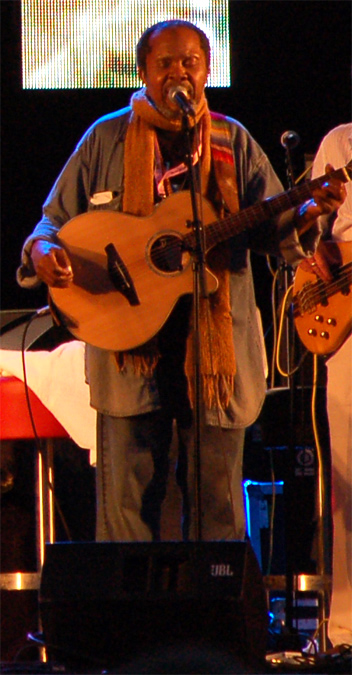
- Callier in 2008

Background information
- Born: Terrence Orlando Callier; May 24, 1945; Chicago, Illinois, U.S.
- Origin: Chicago, U.S.
- Died: October 27, 2012 (aged 67) Chicago, Illinois, U.S.
- Genres: Soul; folk; jazz; funk
- Occupations: Singer-songwriter, computer programmer
- Instruments: Vocals, guitar, piano
- Years active: 1962–1983, 1991–2012

Terrence Orlando "Terry" Callier (May 24, 1945 – October 27, 2012) was an American soul, folk and jazz guitarist and singer-songwriter.

== Life and career ==
Callier was born on the North Side of Chicago, Illinois, and was raised in the Cabrini–Green housing area. He learned piano, was a childhood friend of Curtis Mayfield, Major Lance and Jerry Butler, and began singing in doo-wop groups in his teens. In 1962, he took an audition at Chess Records, where he recorded his debut single, "Look at Me Now". While attending college, he began performing in folk clubs and coffee houses in Chicago, becoming strongly influenced by the music of John Coltrane. During this period, he briefly performed in a duo with David Crosby in Chicago and New York City.

He met Samuel Charters of Prestige Records in 1964; the following year, they recorded his debut album, The New Folk Sound of Terry Callier. Charters then took the tapes with him into the Mexican desert, delaying the release of the album until 1968. Two of Callier's songs, "Spin, Spin, Spin" and "It's About Time", were recorded by the psychedelic rock band H. P. Lovecraft in 1968, as part of their H. P. Lovecraft II album. H. P. Lovecraft featured fellow Chicago folk club stalwart George Edwards, who would go on to co-produce several tracks for Callier in 1969.

He continued to perform in Chicago; in 1970, he joined the Chicago Songwriters Workshop set up by Jerry Butler. He and partner Larry Wade wrote material for Chess and its subsidiary Cadet label, including The Dells' 1972 hit "The Love We Had Stays on My Mind", as a result of which he was awarded his own recording contract with Cadet as a singer-songwriter. Three critically acclaimed but commercially unsuccessful albums followed, produced by Charles Stepney: Occasional Rain (1972), What Color Is Love (1972), and I Just Can't Help Myself (1973). These demonstrated that Callier's influences included soul, jazz, funk, psychedelia, and classical music. Subsequently, he toured with George Benson, Gil Scott-Heron and others. Cadet and its parent label Chess were sold in 1976 and Callier was then dropped from the label. The Songwriters Workshop closed in 1976.

The following year, Don Mizell signed him to a new contract with his Jazz Fusion Division at Elektra Records, resulting in the R&B-oriented Fire On Ice (1977) and Turn You to Love (1978). The opening track of the latter album, "Sign Of The Times", was used as the theme tune of radio DJ Frankie Crocker and became Callier's only US chart success, reaching No. 78 on the R&B chart in 1979. The single prompted his appearance at the Montreux Jazz Festival, where Mizell presented him in the Elektra Jazz Fusion Night showcase alongside Grover Washington, Dee Dee Bridgewater and Lee Ritenour. When Mizell moved on to work with Stevie Wonder in 1980, Callier was dropped from the label.

Callier continued to perform and tour until 1983, when he gained custody of his daughter and retired from music to take classes in computer programming, landing a job at the University of Chicago and returning to college during the evenings to pursue a degree in sociology. He re-emerged from obscurity in the late 1980s, when British DJs discovered his old recordings and began to play his songs in clubs. Acid Jazz Records head Eddie Piller reissued a little-known Callier recording from 1983, "I Don't Want to See Myself (Without You)", and brought him to play clubs in Britain. From 1991 he began to make regular trips to play gigs during his vacation time from work.

In the late 1990s, Callier began his comeback to recorded music, collaborating with Urban Species on their 1997 EP Religion and Politics and contributed to Beth Orton's Best Bit EP in 1997 before releasing the album Timepeace in 1998, which won the United Nations' Time For Peace award for outstanding artistic achievement contributing to world peace. His colleagues at the University of Chicago did not know of Callier's life as a musician, but after the award the news of his work as a musician became widely known and subsequently led to his dismissal by the University.

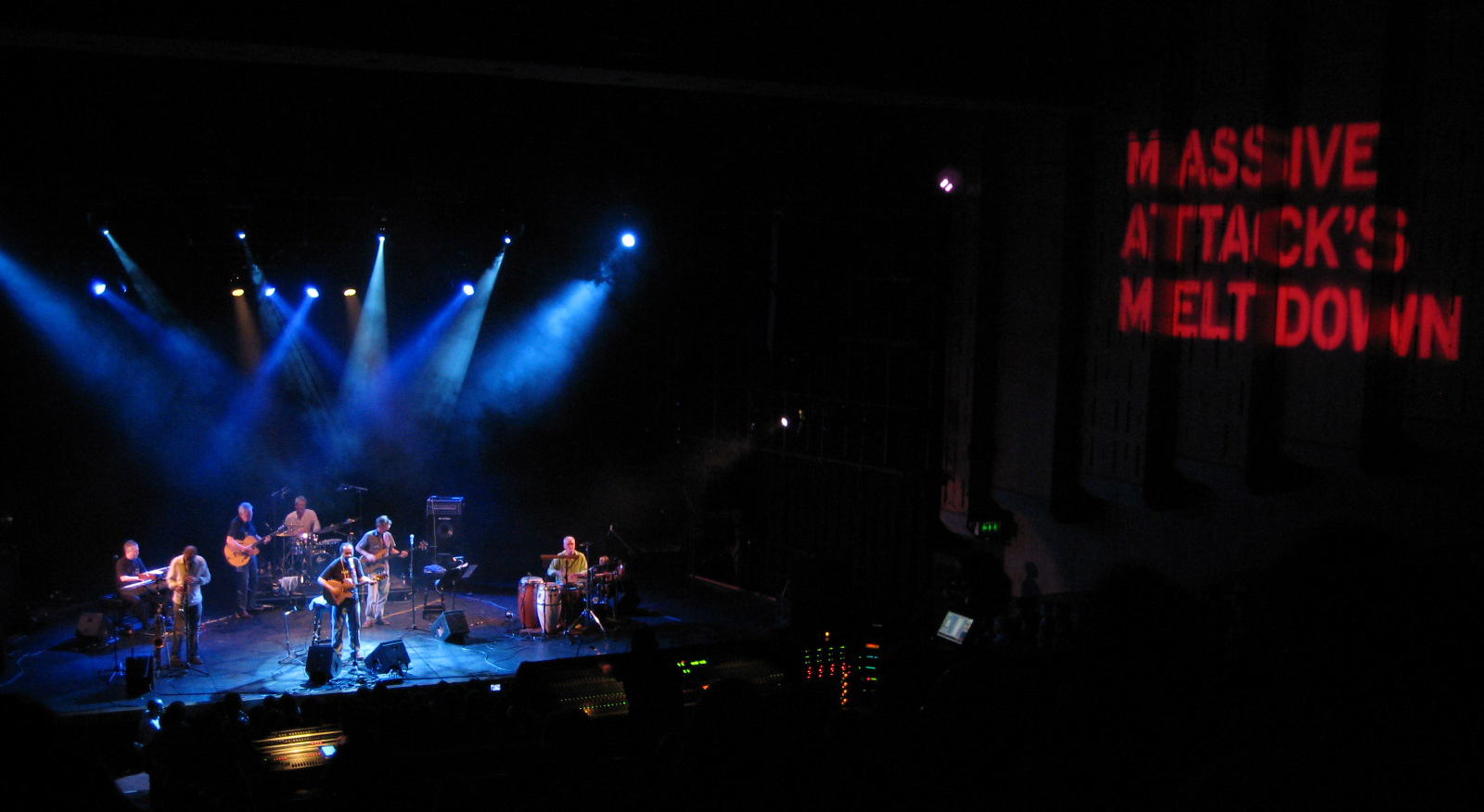
Callier opening for Massive Attack on tour in 2008

As well as touring internationally, Callier continued his recording career, releasing five albums after Timepeace, including Lifetime (1999), Alive (2001), Speak Your Peace (2002), featuring Paul Weller on the single "Brother to Brother", Golden Apples of the Sun (2003), featuring the words of W. B. Yeats' poem The Song of the Wandering Aengus, and Lookin' Out (2004). May 2009 saw his album Hidden Conversations featuring Massive Attack released on Mr Bongo records. In 2001, Callier performed "Satin Doll" for the Red Hot Organization's compilation album Red Hot + Indigo, a tribute to Duke Ellington, which raised money for various charities devoted to increasing AIDS awareness and fighting the disease.

Callier died after a long battle with throat cancer on October 27, 2012, aged 67.

== Discography ==
=== Studio albums ===
- The New Folk Sound of Terry Callier (Prestige, 1968)
- Occasional Rain (Cadet, 1972)
- What Color Is Love (Cadet, 1972)
- I Just Can't Help Myself (Cadet, 1973)
- Fire on Ice (Elektra, 1978)
- Turn You to Love (Elektra, 1979)
- Time Peace (Verve Forecast/Talkin' Loud/PolyGram, 1998) No. 92 UK
- Lifetime (Blue Thumb/Talkin' Loud, 1999) No. 96 UK
- Speak Your Peace (Mr Bongo, 2002) No. 156 UK
- Lookin' Out (Mr Bongo, 2004)
- Hidden Conversations (Mr Bongo, 2009)

=== Live albums ===
- TC in DC (Premonition, 1996) recorded live in Washington D.C. 1982
- Live at Mother Blues, 1964 (Premonition, 2000) recorded live in Chicago 1964
- Alive (Mr Bongo, 2001) recorded live in London 2000
- Welcome Home (Mr Bongo, 2008) recorded live in London 2008

=== Singles and maxi singles ===
- "Look at Me Now" (Chess, 1968)
- "I Just Can't Help Myself" (Cadet, 1973)
- "Ordinary Joe" / "Golden Circle of Your Love" (Cadet)
- "Look at Me Now" / "Ordinary Joe" (Cadet)
- "Butterfly" / "Street Fever" (Elektra, 1978)
- "Sign of the Times" / "Occasional Rain" (Elektra, 1979)
- "I Don't Want to See Myself (Without You)" / "If I Could Make You (Change Your Mind)" (Erect, 1982; reissued on Acid Jazz, 1990 & 2006)
- "Love Theme from Spartacus" (Talkin' Loud/(Verve Forecast), 1998)
- "I Don't Want to See Myself (Without You)" (Talkin' Loud, 1999)
- "Silent Night" (Talkin' Loud, 1999)
- "Holdin' On" / "When My Lady Danced" (Talkin' Loud, 1999)
- "Tomorrow in Your Eyes" – East West Connection featuring Terry Callier (Chillifunk, 2001)
- "Brother to Brother" – Terry Callier with Paul Weller (Mr Bongo 2002)
- "Running Around" / "Monuments of Mars" (Mr Bongo, 2002)
- "In a Heartbeat" – Koop feat. Terry Callier (Superstudio Grå/Sony Music, 2002)
- "Lookin’ Out" (Mr Bongo, 2004)
- "Live with Me" – Massive Attack with Terry Callier (Virgin, 2006)
- "Advice" – Hardkandy featuring Terry Callier (Catskills, 2006)
- "Wings" (Mr Bongo, 2009)

=== DVD and videos ===
- Terry Callier – Live in Berlin (Universal Music, 2005) Prod.: Modzilla Films/Beatrice Tillmann

=== Appearances ===
- Vocals on The Juju Orchestra's – "What Is Hip" (2007)
- Vocals on Massive Attack's "Live with Me" (2006)
- Vocals on Hardkandy's "Advice" (2006)
- Vocals on Nujabes's "Modal Soul" (2005)
- Vocals on Kinobe's "Moonlight and Mescaline" (2004)
- Vocals on Jean-Jacques Milteau's "Blue 3rd" (2003)
- Vocals on Cirque du Soleil's "Varekai" (2002)
- Vocals on Kyoto Jazz Massive's "Deep in Your Mind" (2002)
- Vocals on 4 Hero's "The Day of the Greys" (2001)
- Vocals on Koop's "In a Heartbeat" (2001)
- Vocals on Zero 7's "Simple Things"(2001)
- Vocals on Nitin Sawhney's "The Preacher" (2001)
- Vocals on Grand Tourism's "Les Courants d'Air" (2001)
- Vocals on Beth Orton's Central Reservation (1999)
- Vocals on Urban Species's "Religion and Politics" and "Changing of the Guard", from the album Blanket (1998), after sampling his song "You Goin' Miss Your Candyman" in their song "Listen" from the album by the same name (1994)
- His song "You Goin' Miss Your Candyman" was featured in the French movie, Intouchables.
- His song "Dancing Girl" was featured in the movie, Sentimental Value.
