= Marshall Hawkins (musician) =

American jazz musician (born 1939)

Marshall Hawkins (born July 14, 1939) is a jazz musician and teacher. He grew up in Washington DC.

He is possibly best known for being one of several bassists who took over from Ron Carter when the latter left Miles Davis' so-called Second Great Quintet. Hawkins played with Miles Davis, along with Herbie Hancock and drummer Tony Williams. More recently, Hawkins has been part of the West Coast version of the Harry Pickens Trio, featuring Louisville jazz pianist, with Harold Mason on drums.

Hawkins later taught at the Idyllwild School of Music and the Arts (ISOMATA), now Idyllwild Arts Academy, and currently is head of the Jazz Program.

On February 5, 2022, Hawkins received an honorary doctorate of music performance from a California Baptist University.

== Discography ==
- 1965: Travelin' Light – Shirley Horn
- 1970: Chapter Two – Roberta Flack
- 1970: Everything Is Everything – Donny Hathaway
- 1976: Starburst - Reuben Brown Trio Featuring Richie Cole
- 1979: Hollywood Madness - Richie Cole
- 1981: Tokyo Madness - Richie Cole
- 1985: Vocalese – The Manhattan Transfer
- 1987: Popbob - Richie Cole
- 1998: Richie & Phil & Richie - Richie Cole
- 2003: Marshall Hawkins and Seahawk - Marshall Hawkins
