= Someday We'll All Be Free (Donny Hathaway song) =

1973 song by Donny Hathaway

Single by Donny Hathaway

from the album Extension of a Man
- B-side: "Love, Love, Love"
- Released: 1973
- Recorded: 1971–1973
- Genre: Soul
- Length: 4:14
- Songwriters: Donny Hathaway; Edward Howard

"Someday We'll All Be Free" is a 1973 song by Donny Hathaway from the album Extension of a Man. The song was released as the flipside to the single "Love, Love, Love." Though the song was only released as an uncharted A-side, it is considered an R&B standard, having been covered by many artists over the years.

== Background ==
The lyric was written by Edward Howard, for and about the mental pain that Hathaway, who was diagnosed with paranoid schizophrenia when the song was written, was experiencing at the time. Edward Howard said:

What was going through my mind at the time was Donny, because Donny was a very troubled person. I hoped that at some point he would be released from all that he was going through. There was nothing I could do but write something that might be encouraging for him.

Through the years, the song took on a larger role as an anthem of encouragement for the plight of African Americans suffering racial strife, in spite of the fact that the author’s original meaning was a personal message to Hathaway relating to his mental health struggles.

Donny Hathaway himself particularly loved the song and as Eulalah Hathaway stated:

He loved that song. Donny literally sat in the studio and cried when he heard the playback of his final mix. It's pretty special when an artist can create something that wipes them out.

Although the song did not chart, the B-side of the single, "Love, Love Love," peaked at #44 on the Billboard Hot 100 and #16 on the R&B charts

In June 2026, CBS News included the song in its list of the 250 essential American songs of the past 250 years.

== Personnel ==
- Donny Hathaway – lead vocals, Fender Rhodes electric piano, arrangements
- Cornell Dupree – guitar
- David Spinozza – guitar
- Ray Lucas – drums
- Willie Weeks – bass
- Marvin Stamm – trumpet

== Covers ==
- Aretha Franklin covered the song in the soundtrack for the 1992 film Malcolm X; her version was later nominated for the Grammy Award for Best Female R&B Vocal Performance in 1994
- Kanye West sampled Hathaway’s version on a 2022 song released exclusively on Alex Jones's Infowars website.

== In popular culture ==
Hathaway's version was featured in an episode of AMC's The Walking Dead, in the seventh-season finale "The First Day of the Rest of Your Life", as the character Sasha ingests a cyanide pill.

Hathaway's version was also featured in Showtime's The Chi, in the second-season finale "The Scorpion and the Frog" (episode #10) as the closing music.
