= Back to the Roots (Ramsey Lewis album) =

Studio album by Ramsey Lewis
- Released: 1971
- Recorded: 1971
- Genre: Jazz
- Labels: Cadet; CA-60001
- Producers: Ramsey Lewis, Esmond Edwards

Ramsey Lewis chronology
| Them Changes (1970) | Back to the Roots (1971) | The Groover (1972) |

Back to the Roots is a studio album by jazz pianist Ramsey Lewis which was released in 1971 on Cadet Records. The album peaked at No. 3 on the US Billboard Best Selling Jazz LPs and No. 25 on the US Billboard Best Selling Soul LP's charts.

== Reception ==
Professional ratings
Review scores
| Source | Rating |
|---|---|
| AllMusic | 2/5 stars |

AllMusic gave a 2/5 stars rating of the album.

== Track listing ==
1. "Candida" (Irwin Levine, Toni Wine) - 2:59
2. "We've Only Just Begun" (Paul Williams, Roger Nichols) - 3:58
3. "Back to the Roots" (Cleveland Eaton, Morris Jennings, Ramsey Lewis) - 3:02
4. "Love Now On" (Eaton) - 5:07
5. "The Fool on the Hill" (John Lennon, Paul McCartney) - 6:05
6. "Since I Fell for You" (Buddy Johnson) - 3:03
7. "Up in Yonder" (Eaton) - 4:37
8. "Crescent Noon" (John Bettis, Richard Carpenter) - 4:33
9. "He Ain't Heavy, He's My Brother" (Bob Russell, Bobby Scott) - 7:02

== Personnel ==
- Ramsey Lewis - piano, electric piano
- Cleveland Eaton - electric bass
- Morris Jennings - drums
- Henry L. Gibson - congas, percussion
- Bobby Rush - harmonica (track 7)
- Charles Stepney - organ (track 7)

== Charts ==
| Chart | Peak position |
|---|---|
| US Billboard Best Selling Jazz LPs | 3 |
| US Billboard Best Selling Soul LP's | 25 |
| US Billboard Top LPs | 163 |
