= Donny Hathaway =

American singer-songwriter (1945–1979)

Background information
- Also known as: Donny Pitts
- Born: Donny Edward Hathaway; October 1, 1945; Chicago, Illinois, U.S.
- Died: January 13, 1979 (aged 33) New York City, U.S.
- Genres: R&B; soul; gospel; jazz
- Occupations: Musician; singer; songwriter
- Instruments: Vocals; keyboards
- Years active: 1966–1979
- Labels: Curtom; Atco

Donny Edward Hathaway (October 1, 1945 – January 13, 1979) was an American soul singer, keyboardist, songwriter, backing vocalist, and arranger who Rolling Stone described as a "soul legend". His most popular songs include "The Ghetto", "This Christmas", "Someday We'll All Be Free", and "Little Ghetto Boy". Hathaway is also renowned for his renditions of "A Song for You", "For All We Know", "Jealous Guy" and "I Love You More Than You'll Ever Know", along with "Where Is the Love" and "The Closer I Get to You", two of many collaborations with Roberta Flack. He has been inducted into the St. Louis Walk of Fame and won one Grammy Award from four nominations. Hathaway was also posthumously honored with a Grammy Lifetime Achievement Award in 2019. Dutch director David Kleijwegt made a documentary called Mister Soul – A Story About Donny Hathaway, which premiered at the International Film Festival Rotterdam on January 28, 2020.

== Early life ==
Hathaway, the son of Drusella Huntley, was born into a Black American family in Chicago, Illinois, and was raised by his grandmother, Martha Pitts, also known as Martha Crumwell, in the Carr Square housing project of St. Louis, Missouri. Hathaway began singing in the church choir with his grandmother, a professional gospel singer, at the age of three, and studying piano. He graduated from Vashon High School in 1963. Hathaway then studied music on a fine arts scholarship at Howard University in Washington, D.C., where he met his roommate and drummer Ric Powell, who ultimately launched Donny's musical career as a member of "The Ric Powell Trio". At Howard, he was also a member of the Alpha Phi Alpha fraternity, but during 1967, just before completing a degree, Donny and Ric left Howard after receiving job offers in the music business with the likes of Curtis Mayfield's Curtom Records in Chicago.

== Career ==
Hathaway worked as a songwriter, session musician, and producer for Curtis Mayfield's Curtom Records in Chicago. He did the arrangements for hits by the Unifics ("Court of Love" and "The Beginning of My End") and took part in projects by the Staple Singers, Jerry Butler, Aretha Franklin, the Impressions and Curtis Mayfield himself. After becoming a "house producer" at Curtom, he started recording there. Hathaway recorded his first single under his own name in 1969, a duet with singer June Conquest called "I Thank You, Baby". They also recorded the duet "Just Another Reason", released as the B-side. Former Cleveland Browns president Bill Futterer, who as a college student promoted Curtom in the southeast in 1968 and 1969, was befriended by Hathaway and has cited Hathaway's influence on his later projects.

That year, Hathaway signed to Atco Records, then a division of Atlantic Records, after being spotted for the label by producer/musician King Curtis at a trade convention. He released his first single of note, "The Ghetto, Pt. 1", which he co-wrote with former Howard roommate Leroy Hutson, who became a performer, writer, and producer with Curtom. The track appeared the following year on his critically acclaimed debut LP, Everything Is Everything, which he co-produced with Ric Powell while also arranging all the cuts.

His second LP, Donny Hathaway, consisted mostly of covers of contemporary pop, soul, and gospel songs. His third album Roberta Flack & Donny Hathaway was an album of duets with former Howard University associate and label mate Roberta Flack, for whom he previously sang backup on "Killing Me Softly with His Song" that established him, especially on the pop charts. The album was a critical and commercial success, including the Ralph MacDonald-penned track "Where Is the Love", which proved to be not only an R&B success, but also scored Top Five on the pop Hot 100. It sold over one million copies, and was awarded a gold disc by the RIAA on September 5, 1972. The album also included other covers, including versions of Carole King's "You've Got a Friend", "Baby I Love You", originally a hit for Aretha Franklin, and "You've Lost That Loving Feeling".

Perhaps Hathaway's most influential recording is his 1972 album, Live, which has been termed "one of the best live albums ever recorded" by Daryl Easlea of the BBC. The album is on the list of "40 Favourite Live Albums" published by British online music and culture magazine The Quietus. It was recorded at two concerts: side one at the Troubadour in Hollywood, and side two at The Bitter End in Greenwich Village, Manhattan.

Hathaway was the co-composer and performer of the Christmas standard, "This Christmas". The song, released in 1970, has become a holiday staple and is often used in movies, television and advertising. "This Christmas" has been covered by numerous artists across diverse musical genres, including The Whispers, Diana Ross, Aretha Franklin, The Temptations, The Four Tops, Stevie Wonder, Alexander O'Neal, Christina Aguilera, Chicago, Harry Connick, Jr., Dru Hill, *NSYNC, Gloria Estefan, Boney James, The Cheetah Girls, Chris Brown, Anthony Arnett (First Baptist Bracktown Christmas Celebration), Patti LaBelle and Mary J. Blige (A Mary Christmas), Seal, Train and CeeLo Green, among other artists.

Hathaway followed this flurry of work with contributions to soundtracks, along with his recording of the theme song to the TV series Maude. He composed and conducted music for the 1972 soundtrack of the movie Come Back Charleston Blue. In the mid-1970s, he produced albums for other artists including Cold Blood, where he expanded the musical range of lead singer Lydia Pense.

His final studio album, Extension of a Man came out in 1973 with two tracks, "Love Love Love" and "I Love You More Than You'll Ever Know" reaching both the pop and R&B charts. It also included his classic ballad, "Someday We'll All Be Free" and a six-minute symphonic-styled instrumental piece called "I Love The Lord, He Heard My Cry". He told UK music journalist David Nathan in 1973, "I always liked pretty music and I've always wanted to write it." Added the writer, "He declined to give one particular influence or inspiration but said that Ravel, Debussy and Stravinsky were amongst whom he studied."

He returned to the charts in 1978 after again teaming up with Roberta Flack for a duet, "The Closer I Get to You" on her album, Blue Lights in the Basement. The song topped the R&B chart and reached the No. 2 spot on the Hot 100. Atlantic then put out another solo single, "You Were Meant For Me" shortly before his sudden death.

Liner notes for later releases of his final solo album explain: "Donny is no longer here, but the song "Someday We'll All Be Free" gathers momentum as part of his legacy... Donny literally sat in the studio and cried when he heard the playback of his final mix. It's pretty special when an artist can create something that wipes them out." Edward Howard, lyricist of the song, adds, "It was a spiritual thing for me... What was going through my mind at the time was Donny, because Donny was a very troubled person. I hoped that at some point he would be released from all that he was going through. There was nothing I could do but write something that might be encouraging for him. He's a good leader for young black men".

== Personal life ==
=== Family ===
In 1967, Hathaway married Eulaulah Vann. The two met while attending Howard University where both were studying music. They had two daughters, Eulaulah Donyll (Lalah) and Kenya Canc'Libra. Lalah has enjoyed a successful solo career, while Kenya is a session singer and one of the three backing vocalists on the hit TV program American Idol. Both daughters are graduates of the Berklee College of Music.

=== Mental illness ===
During the peak of his career, Hathaway began experiencing severe bouts of depression and exhibiting unusual behavior. Between 1973 and 1974, he was hospitalized several times until he was eventually diagnosed with paranoid schizophrenia for which he was prescribed various medications. At one point, Hathaway was prescribed fourteen different medications that he was to take twice a day. After Hathaway was diagnosed and began taking medication, his mental state improved. However, Eulaulah Hathaway has said that her husband became less than diligent about following his prescription regimen when he began feeling better and often stopped taking his medications altogether.

From 1973 to 1977, Hathaway's mental instability wreaked havoc on his life and career and required several hospitalizations. The effects of his depression and severe mood swings also drove a wedge in his and Flack's friendship; they did not reconcile for several years, and did not release additional music until the successful release of "The Closer I Get to You" in 1978. Flack and Hathaway then resumed studio recording to compose a second album of duets.

== Death ==
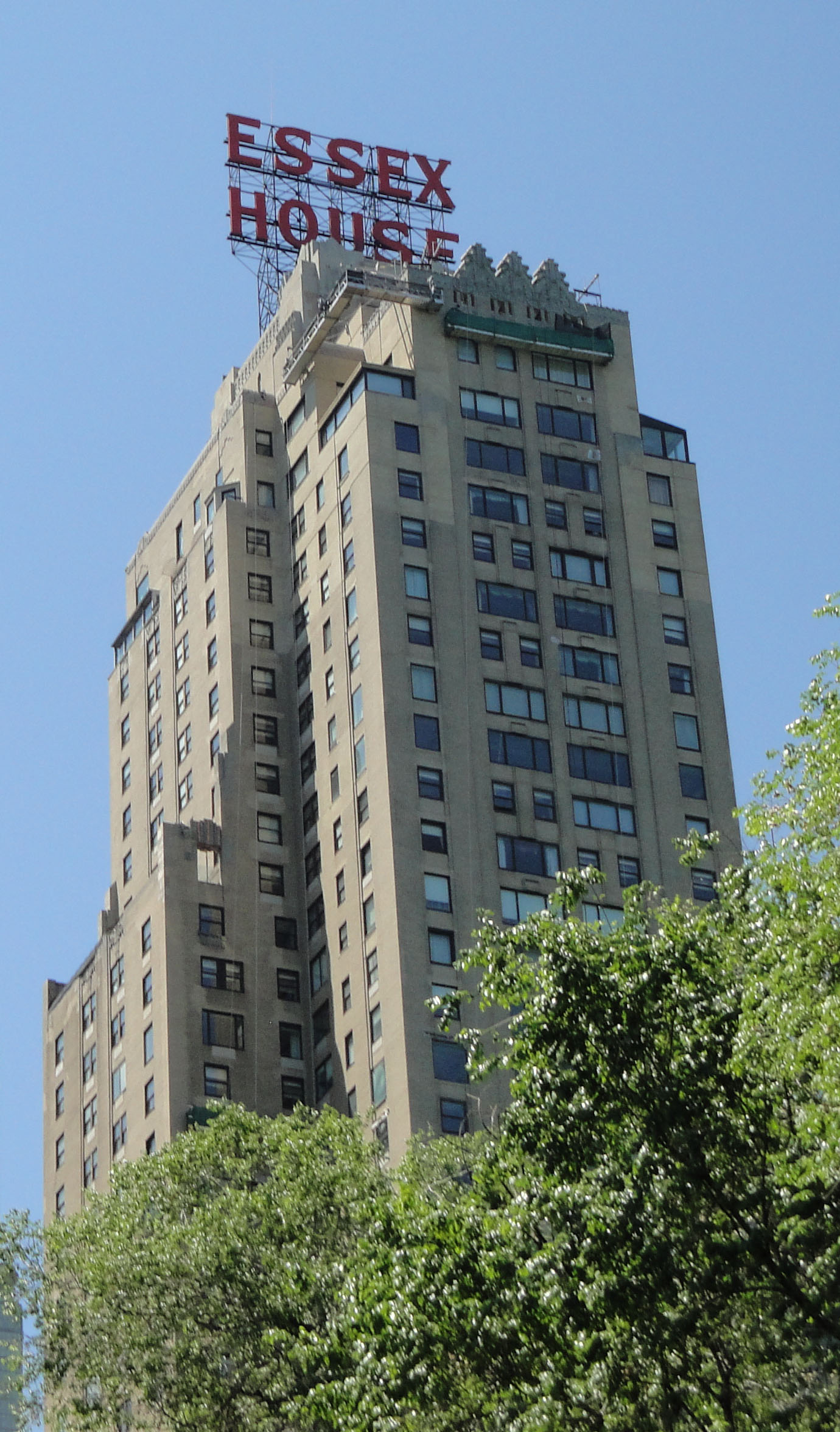
Essex House hotel

Sessions for another album of duets were under way in 1979. On January 13, Hathaway began a recording session with producers/musicians Eric Mercury and James Mtume. Each reported that although Hathaway was singing fine, he began behaving irrationally, seeming to be paranoid and delusional. According to Mtume, Hathaway said that white people were trying to kill him and had connected his brain to a machine for the purpose of stealing his music and his voice. Given Hathaway's behavior, Mercury said that he decided the recording session could not continue, so he aborted it and all of the musicians went home.

Hours later, Hathaway was found dead on the pavement below the window of his 15th-floor room in New York City's Essex House hotel at 160 Central Park South. It was reported that he had jumped from his balcony. His hotel room door was locked from the inside and the window glass had been carefully removed. There were no signs of a struggle, leading investigators to rule that Hathaway's death was a suicide. Flack was devastated and, spurred by his death, included the few duets they had finished on her next album, Roberta Flack Featuring Donny Hathaway (1980). According to Mercury, Hathaway's final recording was "You Are My Heaven", a song Mercury co-wrote with Stevie Wonder.

Hathaway's funeral was conducted by the Reverend Jesse Jackson. Later in 1979, the Whispers recorded the tribute "Song for Donny" for their self-titled album. The song reached No. 21 on the R&B chart. That same year, they used that tribute song's arrangement to do a cover of Hathaway's song "This Christmas", included on their Christmas album, Happy Holidays to You.

== Influence ==
Elton John’s music was heavily influenced by Hathaway. According to Allison Keyes from NPR, Hathaway's solo recordings are "part of the foundation of American soul music" and have "influenced performers from R&B singers Alicia Keys & Aaliyah to rapper Common to singer-guitarist George Benson". He was named the 49th-greatest singer of all time in a 2010 list published by Rolling Stone. Justin Timberlake called him "the best singer of all time." Raúl Midón said that Hathaway is "the strongest soul singer that ever existed" and compares his vocal technique to a classical vocalist. "When Donny sings any song, he owns it," Stevie Wonder was quoted by David Ritz as saying.

Amy Winehouse called Hathaway her favorite artist of all time and refers to "Mr Hathaway" in her song "Rehab." The Korean indie pop group Hathaw9y named themselves in honor of him. Rock critic Robert Christgau described Hathaway as "a synthesizer of limitless cultural aspiration" who "conveyed a sense of roots" and was never content with "the classbound pop fantasies of Ashford & Simpson", but mused that "the idealistic credulousness of a project that incorporated pop, jazz, a little blues, lots of gospel, and the conservatory into an all-over black style is linked to the floridity that mars much of his work."

== Discography ==
=== Studio albums ===
Year	Album	Chart positions				Certifications	Record label
Year	Album	US	US R&B	AUS	UK	Certifications	Record label
1970	Everything Is Everything	73	33	—	—	—	Atco
1971	Donny Hathaway	89	6	—	—	—	Atco
1972	Roberta Flack & Donny Hathaway	3	2	22	31	RIAA: Gold	Atlantic
1973	Extension of a Man	69	18	—	—	—	Atco

=== Live albums ===
Year	Album	Chart positions		Certifications	Record label
Year	Album	US	US R&B	Certifications	Record label
1972	Live	18	4	RIAA: Gold	Atco
1980	In Performance	201	68	—	Atlantic
2004	These Songs for You, Live!	—	78	—	Atlantic
2014	Live at the Bitter End, 1971	—	—	—	Atlantic
"—" denotes the album failed to chart or was not certified

=== Soundtrack albums ===
Year	Album	Chart positions	Record label
Year	Album	US	Record label
1972	Come Back Charleston Blue	198	Atco

=== Compilation albums ===
Year	Album	Chart positions			Record label
Year	Album	US	US R&B	KOR (Int.)	Record label
1972	The Most Beautiful Songs of Roberta Flack and Donny Hathaway	—	—	—	Atlantic
1978	The Best of Donny Hathaway	—	51	—	Atco
1990	A Donny Hathaway Collection	108	—	—	Atlantic
2000	Free Soul: The Classic of Donny Hathaway	—	—	—	WEA Int'l
2010	Someday We'll All Be Free	—	—	—	Atlantic
2010	Original Album Series	—	—	—	Atlantic
2011	Flashback with Donny Hathaway	—	—	—	Atlantic
2013	Never My Love: The Anthology	—	—	67	Atco
"—" denotes the album failed to chart or was not certified

=== Singles ===
Year	Single	Chart positions				Certifications
Year	Single	US	US R&B	US AC	UK	Certifications
1969	"I Thank You Baby" (with June Conquest)	—	45	—	—	
1970	"The Ghetto – Part 1"	87	23	—	—	
1970	"This Christmas"	34	—	—	63	BPI: Silver
1971	"You've Got a Friend" (with Roberta Flack)	29	8	36	—	
1971	"You've Lost That Lovin' Feelin'" (with Roberta Flack)	71	30	—	—	
1972	"Little Ghetto Boy"	109	25	—	—	
1972	"Giving Up"	81	21	—	—	
1972	"I Thank You" (re-release) (with June Conquest)	94	41	—	—	
1972	"Where Is the Love" (with Roberta Flack)	5	1	1	29	RIAA: Gold
1972	"Come Back Charleston Blue" (with Margie Joseph)	102	—	—	—	
1972	"I Love You More Than You'll Ever Know"	60	20	—	—	
1973	"Love, Love, Love"	44	16	—	—	
1973	"Come Little Children"	—	67	—	—	
1978	"The Closer I Get to You" (with Roberta Flack)	2	1	3	42	RIAA: Gold
1978	"You Were Meant for Me"	—	17	—	—	
1980	"You Are My Heaven" (with Roberta Flack)	47	8	46	—	
1980	"Back Together Again" (with Roberta Flack)	56	8	—	3	
"—" denotes the single failed to chart or was not certified

=== As guest ===
- Phil Upchurch – Upchurch (Cadet, 1969)
- Phil Upchurch – The Way I Feel (Cadet, 1970)
- Aretha Franklin – Young, Gifted and Black (Atlantic, 1972)
- Roberta Flack – Roberta Flack Featuring Donny Hathaway (Atlantic, 1980)

== Tributes ==
- On the 1999 Rise album by Gabrielle, the track "When a Woman" references singing along to Roberta Flack and Donny Hathaway. Gabrielle also later went on to cover "This Christmas".
- On soul group the Whispers' 1979 self-titled album, the group paid homage with "Song for Donny", written by fellow soul singer Carrie Lucas. The song was set to the melody of Hathaway's "This Christmas".
- In 1999, Aaron Hall recorded a brief tribute version of "Someday We'll All Be Free" on the third album for his group Guy titled Guy III, with Teddy Riley and Damion Hall
- In September 2001, Alicia Keys performed "Someday We'll All Be Free" on the 9/11 televised tribute concert America: A Tribute to Heroes.
- In 2005, neo-soul singer songwriter guitarist- Raul Midón (Blue Note) worked with Hathaway's longtime producer Arif Mardin and created a tribute song to Hathaway called "Sittin' in the Middle".
- In her 2006 song "Rehab", Amy Winehouse sings of learning from "Mr. Hathaway" instead of going to rehab.
- In 2007, Deniece Williams covered "Someday We'll All Be Free" for her Love, Niecy Style album. Williams later shared that she broke down in tears in the studio while recording.
- The song "What a Catch, Donnie", from Fall Out Boy's fourth studio album, Folie à Deux (2008), is named for Hathaway and mentions Roberta Flack, his writing partner.
- Bizzy Bone's song entitled "A Song for You", is a track that includes an interpretation of Donny Hathaway's original recording of the same name.
- In 2010, Amy Winehouse sang one of Donny's songs, "We're Still Friends", for a live concert.
- In the 2013 song "Classic", band MKTO references writing songs "like Hathaway"
- In 2017, in the episode "The First Day of the Rest of Your Life" from AMC's The Walking Dead. The character of Sasha, played by Sonequa Martin-Green, dies by suicide while listening to "Someday We'll All Be Free."
- In 2019, in the episode "And Salt the Earth Behind You" from HBO's Euphoria. Hathaway's cover of "A Song for You" plays during a montage of the day of the death of the father of the character of Rue Bennett, played by Zendaya.
- In the 2019 song "Ladies, Ladies, Ladies", JID raps that he knew a girl who "used to love Donny Hathaway".
- In 2021, Hathaway's cover of John Lennon's "Jealous Guy" was used during the credits in episode 7 of the second season of Mythic Quest.
