= Phil Upchurch =

American jazz and blues guitarist (1941–2025)

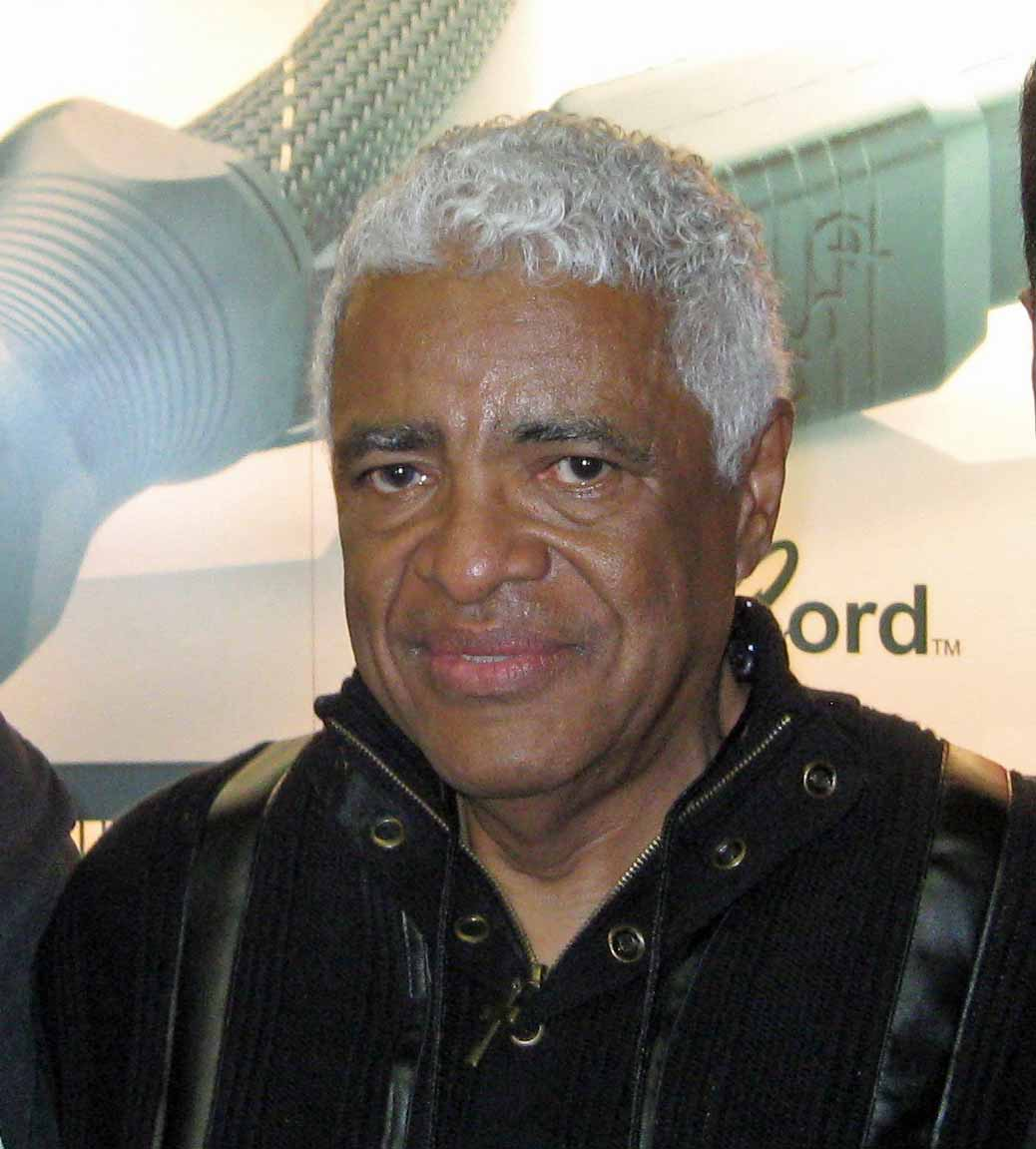
- Upchurch in 2012

Background information
- Born: July 19, 1941; Chicago, Illinois, U.S.
- Died: November 23, 2025 (aged 84) Los Angeles, California, U.S.
- Genres: Soul music; R&B; blues; jazz
- Occupations: Musician; guitarist; bassist
- Instruments: Guitar; bass
- Years active: 1950s–2025
- Labels: Chess; Cadet; Blue Thumb; His Master's Voice
- Formerly of: The Soulful Strings; Rotary Connection
- Website: Official website

Philip Rodney Upchurch (July 19, 1941 – November 23, 2025) was an American guitarist and bass guitarist who performed and recorded in musical styles including soul music, R&B, jazz and blues.

== Life and career ==
Upchurch was born in Chicago, Illinois, on July 19, 1941. He started his career working with the Kool Gents, the Dells, and the Spaniels, before going on to work with Curtis Mayfield, Otis Rush, and Jimmy Reed. (His association with Kool Gents member Dee Clark would continue, including playing guitar on Clark's 1961 solo hit "Raindrops".) He then returned to Chicago to play and record with Woody Herman, Stan Getz, Groove Holmes, B.B. King, and Dizzy Gillespie.

In 1961, his record "You Can't Sit Down" by the Philip Upchurch Combo, sold over one million copies and was awarded a gold disc. "You Can't Sit Down, Part 2" peaked at No. 29 on the Billboard charts in the US. In the 1960s, he toured with Oscar Brown, appearing on the 1965 live album, Mr. Oscar Brown, Jr. Goes to Washington. He played bass on The Staple Singers 1965 album Freedom Highway. In the mid-1960s, he was house guitarist of Chess Records and he played with The Dells, Howlin' Wolf, Muddy Waters and Gene Chandler. He also played with John Lee Hooker, Grover Washington, Jr. and Cannonball Adderley. Upchurch was part of a group called The Soulful Strings during the 1960s, prior to working with the Rotary Connection on Chess's Cadet label.

In the 1970s, he worked with Donny Hathaway, Harvey Mason, Ramsey Lewis, Quincy Jones and led his own quartet with Tennyson Stephens. He met Bob Krasnow and Tommy LiPuma, the founders of Blue Thumb Records, and he released Darkness Darkness. Upchurch played on Donny Hathaway's "This Christmas" and "The Ghetto". He also played guitar on Hathaway's Live album (1972). In the mid-1970s and 1980s, he performed with George Benson, Mose Allison, Gary Burton, Lenny Breau, Joe Williams, Chaka Khan, Natalie Cole, Carmen McRae, Cat Stevens, David Sanborn, and Michael Jackson. In the 1990s, he worked with Jimmy Smith and Jack McDuff.

Upchurch died in Los Angeles, California, on November 23, 2025, at the age of 84.

== Discography ==
=== As leader ===
- You Can't Sit Down, Part Two (Boyd/United Artists UAL-3162 mono and UAS-6162 stereo, 1961)
- The Big Hit Dances: The Twist... (United Artists UAL-3175 mono and UAS-6175 stereo, 1962)
- Feeling Blue: The Phil Upchurch Guitar Sound (Milestone 9010; OJC 1100, 1967)
- Upchurch (Cadet/Chess LPS-826, 1969) with Donny Hathaway on piano.
- The Way I Feel (Cadet/Chess/GRT LPS-840, 1970) with Donny Hathaway on piano.
- Darkness Darkness (Blue Thumb BTS-6005, 1972)
- Lovin' Feeling (Blue Thumb BTS-59, 1973)
- Upchurch/Tennyson with Tennyson Stephens (Kudu/CTI KU-22, 1975)
- Phil Upchurch (Marlin/TK Records MAR-2209, 1978) produced by John Tropea and George Benson.
- Free & Easy (JAM [Jazz America Marketing] 007, 1981)
- Revelation (JAM 011, 1982)
- Name of the Game (JAM 018, 1983)
- Companions (JAM 021, 1984) issued as Paladin/Virgin PAL-4 for UK market.
- Phil Upchurch Presents L.A. Jazz Quintet (Pro Arte/Intersound 631, 1986) with Brandon Fields, Bobby Lyle, Brian Bromberg, Harvey Mason.
- Dolphin Dance (Sound Service 6177, 1987)
- Midnite Blue (Electric Bird/King [Japan] KICJ-53, 1991) compilation of JAM material.
- All I Want (Ichiban ICH-1127, 1991)
- Whatever Happened To The Blues (Ridgetop/Bean Bag/Go Jazz 55566; Go Jazz 6006, 1991) issued as Go Jazz VBR-2066 for Germany market.
- Love Is Strange (Ridgetop/Bean Bag/Go Jazz 55552; Go Jazz 6014, 1995)
- Rhapsody & Blues (Go Jazz 6035, 1999)
- Tell the Truth! (Evidence 22222, 2001) produced by Carla Olson.
- Impressions Of Curtis Mayfield by Jazz Soul Seven (BFM Jazz/Varese Sarabande 62413, 2012) produced by Brian Brinkerhoff; co-produced and arranged by Phil Upchurch; featuring Terri Lyne Carrington, Russ Ferrante, Master Henry Gibson, Bob Hurst, Wallace Roney, Phil Upchurch, Ernie Watts. ["The album I'm most proud of", Phil Upchurch 2012].

=== With the Soulful Strings ===
- Paint It Black (Cadet/Chess LPS-776, 1966)
- Groovin' with the Soulful Strings (Cadet/Chess LPS-796, 1967)
- Another Exposure (Cadet/Chess LPS-805, 1968)
- The Magic of Christmas (Cadet/Chess LPS-814, 1968)
- Back by Demand: The Soulful Strings in Concert (Cadet/Chess LPS-820, 1969)
- String Fever (Cadet/Chess LPS-834, 1969)
- Play Gamble-Huff (Cadet/Chess/GRT LPS-846, 1971)
- The Best of the Soulful Strings (Cadet/Chess/GRT 2CA-50022, 1972) compilation/2-LP set

=== As sideman ===
With Anita Baker

- Christmas Fantasy (Blue Note, 2005)

With George Benson

- Bad Benson (CTI, 1974)
- Good King Bad (CTI, 1975)
- Breezin' (Warner Bros., 1976)
- In Flight (Warner Bros., 1977)
- Livin' Inside Your Love (Warner Bros., 1979)

With Oscar Brown Jr.

- Mr. Oscar Brown Jr. Goes to Washington (Fontana, 1965)

With Peabo Bryson and Natalie Cole

- We're the Best of Friends (Capitol, 1979)

With Dee Clark

- Raindrops (Vee Jay, 1961)

With Natalie Cole

- Unpredictable (Capitol, 1977)
- I Love You So (Capitol, 1979)
- Holly & Ivy (Elektra, 1994)

With Bob Dylan

- Christmas in the Heart (Columbia, 2009)

With Sheena Easton

- No Strings (MCA, 1993)

With Stan Getz

- What the World Needs Now: Stan Getz Plays Burt Bacharach and Hal David (Verve, 1968)

With Dizzy Gillespie

- The Real Thing (Perception, 1969)

With Donny Hathaway

- Everything Is Everything (Atco, 1970)
- Donny Hathaway (Atco, 1971)
- Live (Atco, 1972)
- Extension of a Man (Atco, 1973)

With Howlin' Wolf

- The Howlin' Wolf Album (Cadet Concept, 1969)
- The London Howlin' Wolf Sessions (Chess, 1971) with Eric Clapton, Bill Wyman, Charlie Watts, Steve Winwood, Ringo Starr, and others...

With Michael Jackson

- Off the Wall (Epic, 1979)

With Dr. John

- Afterglow (Blue Thumb, 1995)

With Chaka Khan

- Chaka (Warner Bros., 1978)
- Naughty (Warner Bros., 1980)

With Hubert Laws

- The Chicago Theme (CTI, 1974)

With Ramsey Lewis

- Them Changes (Cadet/GRT, 1970)

With Jack McDuff

- The Natural Thing (Cadet, 1968)
- The Heatin' System (Cadet/GRT, 1971)
- Magnetic Feel (Cadet/GRT, 1975)
- Kisses (Sugar Hill, 1981)

With Carmen McRae

- Fine and Mellow: Live at Birdland West (Concord, 1987)

With Jimmy Reed

- Just Jimmy Reed (1962)
- Soulin' (BluesWay, 1967)
- Big Boss Man (BluesWay, 1968)
- Down in Virginia (BluesWay, 1969)

With Minnie Riperton

- Come to My Garden (GRT, 1970; Janus, 1974)
- Minnie (Capitol, 1979)

With Rotary Connection

- Rotary Connection (Cadet Concept, 1968)

With Ben Sidran

- Don't Let Go (Blue Thumb, 1974)

With Jimmy Smith

- Stay Loose (Verve, 1968)
- Prime Time (Milestone, 1989)
- Sum Serious Blues (Milestone, 1993)
- Dot Com Blues (Blue Thumb, 2000)
- Black Cat (Castle Pie, 2001)

With Muddy Waters

- Electric Mud (Cadet Concept, 1968)
- After The Rain (Cadet Concept, 1969)
