= The Best of Minnie Riperton =

Greatest hits album by Minnie Riperton
- Released: 1981
- Recorded: 1974–1980
- Genre: R&B; soul; funk
- Label: Capitol
- Producer: Richard Rudolph; Johnny Pate; Stevie Wonder; Stewart Levine; Henry Lewy

Minnie Riperton chronology
Love Lives Forever (1980)	The Best of Minnie Riperton (1981)	Gold: The Best of Minnie Riperton (1993)

The Best of Minnie Riperton is a posthumous greatest hits album by American singer Minnie Riperton, released in 1981 and issued by Capitol Records. The album consists of the hits like "Perfect Angel," "Lovin' You," "Inside My Love" and "Adventures in Paradise". Also included are her last two released singles "Here We Go" and "You Take My Breath Away," both from the album Love Lives Forever.

The hits album features a new remix of "Memory Lane"; unreleased live versions of "Can You Feel What I'm Saying?", "Lover And Friend", and "Young, Willing, and Able"; two brief dialog tracks called "Moments with Minnie..."; and a cover of Joni Mitchell's "A Woman of Heart And Mind", a holdover from the Minnie sessions, as the "new" track.

Nothing from Riperton's Come to My Garden album appears here, nor does her early Chess Records releases as Andrea Davis or her material as a member of Rotary Connection (That would come later in 2001 on the 2-CD set Petals: The Minnie Riperton Collection). This album only covers her catolog with both Epic Records and Capitol Records.

== Track listing ==
No.	Title	Writer(s)	Album	Length
1.	"A Moment with Minnie..." (dialogue)			0:52
2.	"Perfect Angel" (single mix)	Stevie Wonder	Perfect Angel	3:21
3.	"Memory Lane" (1981 Mix)	Minnie Riperton, Richard Rudolph; Keni St. Lewis, Gene Dozier	Minnie	3:57
4.	"Lovin' You" (single mix)	Riperton, Rudolph	Perfect Angel	3:42
5.	"Can You Feel What I'm Saying?" (live version)	Riperton, Rudolph, Leon Ware	Stay in Love	4:28
6.	"Here We Go" (featuring Peabo Bryson)	Riperton, Rudolph, Arthur Phillips	Love Lives Forever	4:03
7.	"Inside My Love" (single mix)	Riperton, Rudolph	Adventures in Paradise	3:58
8.	"Lover and Friend" (live version)	Riperton, Rudolph, Lewis, Dozier	Minnie	4:09
9.	"Woman of Heart and Mind" (previously unreleased)	Joni Mitchell		3:42
10.	"Young, Willing and Able" (live version)	Riperton, Rudolph, Marlo Henderson	Stay in Love	4:18
11.	"You Take My Breath Away" (radio edit)	Riperton, Rudolph, Randy Waldman	Love Lives Forever	3:43
12.	"Another Moment with Minnie..." (dialogue)			0:35
13.	"Adventures in Paradise"	Riperton, Joe Sample, Rudolph	Adventures in Paradise	3:12

== Credits ==
- Art Direction – Roy Kohara
- Mixed By – David Cole (4) (tracks: A3)
- Photography By – George Hurrell
- Producer – Henry Lewy (tracks: A3, B1, B2), Johnny Pate (tracks: A6, B4), Minnie Riperton (tracks: A2 to A5, A7 to B3, B6)
  Richard Rudolph (tracks: A2 to B4, B6), Stewart Levine (tracks: A5, A7, B6)

== Charts ==
Chart (1982)	Peak position
U.S. Billboard Top Black Albums	59
U.S. Billboard Bubbling Under The Top LPs	203
