= Gold: The Best of Minnie Riperton =

Greatest hits album by Minnie Riperton
- Released: June 21, 1993
- Recorded: 1974–1980
- Genre: R&B; soul; funk
- Length: 1:07:07
- Label: Capitol
- Producer: Richard Rudolph; Stevie Wonder; Henry Lewy; Stewart Levine

Minnie Riperton chronology
The Best of Minnie Riperton (1981)	Gold: The Best of Minnie Riperton (1993)	Les Fluers (2000)

Gold: The Best of Minnie Riperton is a 1993 greatest hits album by American singer Minnie Riperton, released by Capitol Records. The hits album features many of Riperton's popular hits, "Memory Lane", "Perfect Angel", "Inside My Love", and the No. 1 pop hit "Lovin' You".

Also, included is her final single "Here We Go" a duet with Peabo Bryson, from the album Love Lives Forever and "Light My Fire" a duet with José Feliciano.

== Track listing ==
No.	Title	Writer(s)	Length
1.	"Perfect Angel"	Stevie Wonder	3:21
2.	"Lover and Friend" (Single Version)	Minnie Riperton, Richard Rudolph, Gene Dozier	3:56
3.	"Memory Lane" (Single Version)	Dozier, Riperton, Rudolph	3:20
4.	"Woman of Heart and Mind"	Joni Mitchell	3:42
5.	"Lovin' You"	Riperton, Rudolph	3:22
6.	"Young, Willing and Able"	Marlo Henderson, Riperton, Rudolph	3:44
7.	"Can You Feel What I'm Saying?"	Riperton, Rudolph, Leon Ware	4:17
8.	"Stick Together"	Riperton, Rudolph, Wonder	6:18
9.	"Wouldn't Matter Where You Are"	Henderson, Riperton, Rudolph	4:00
10.	"Stay in Love"	Henderson, Riperton, Rudolph	3:16
11.	"Inside My Love"	Riperton, Rudolph, Ware	3:58
12.	"Here We Go" (featuring Peabo Bryson)	Arthur Phillips, Rudolph	4:03
13.	"Give Me Time" (Single Version)	Leonard Caston, Jr., Lila Hurtado	3:59
14.	"You Take My Breath Away"	Rudolph, Randy Waldman	3:43
15.	"Adventures in Paradise"	Riperton, Rudolph, Joe Sample	3:15
16.	"Simple Things"	Riperton, Rudolph	3:44
17.	"Light My Fire" (featuring José Feliciano)	Jim Morrison, John Densmore, Robby Krieger, Ray Manzarek	5:09

== Credits ==
- Producer – Richard Rudolph, Minnie Riperton, Stevie Wonder, Stewart Levine
