= Petals: The Minnie Riperton Collection =

Compilation album by Minnie Riperton
- Released: February 12, 2001
- Recorded: 1969–1979
- Genre: R&B; soul; funk; pop
- Length: 2:12:57
- Label: Capitol
- Producer: Richard Rudolph; Johnny Pate; Freddie Perren; Stevie Wonder; Stewart Levine; Henry Lewy; Jeremy Lubbock

Minnie Riperton chronology
Les Fleurs (2000)	Petals: The Minnie Riperton Collection (2001)

Petals: The Minnie Riperton Collection
Review scores
Source	Rating
AllMusic	4.5/5 stars

Petals: The Minnie Riperton Collection is a posthumous 2-disc set compilation album by American R&B and soul singer Minnie Riperton, released in 2001 and issued by Capitol Records. The compilation consists of songs from her albums released on Epic Records and Capitol Records. The collection includes her number-one pop hit "Lovin' You", the popular "Perfect Angel", "Inside My Love", "Adventures in Paradise" and "Memory Lane".

Also featured is Riperton's last released single "Here We Go" from the album Love Lives Forever, a live reprise of "Lovin' You" featuring George Benson and a cover of Joni Mitchell's "A Woman of Heart And Mind". The tracks "You Gave Me Soul" and "Lonely Girl" from her Chess Records days, which she recorded under the name Andrea Davis, songs from her Come to My Garden album, as well as her material as a member of Rotary Connection on "I Took a Ride", "Were Going Wrong", and a cover of "Respect" appear here.

== Track listing ==
Disc 1
No.	Title	Writer(s)	Length
1.	"The Edge of a Dream"	Minnie Riperton, Richard Rudolph	4:22
2.	"You Gave Me Soul" (as Andrea Davis)	B.B. Davis, Sugar Pie DeSanto	2:40
3.	"Lonely Girl" (as Andrea Davis)	Davis, DeSanto	3:01
4.	"Respect" (featuring Rotary Connection)	Otis Redding	3:05
5.	"We're Going Wrong" (featuring Rotary Connection)	Jack Bruce	3:18
6.	"I Took a Ride (Caravan)" (featuring Rotary Connection)		6:05
7.	"Come to My Garden"	Rudolph	3:14
8.	"Completeness"	Charles Stepney, Rose Johnson	3:24
9.	"Expecting"	Stepney, Jon Stocklin	3:51
10.	"Les Fleur"	Stepney, Rudolph	3:18
11.	"Studio Dialog"		0:34
12.	"Seeing You This Way" (Demo session)	Riperton, Rudolph	2:39
13.	"Reasons"	Riperton, Rudolph	3:27
14.	"Take a Little Trip"	Stevie Wonder	4:08
15.	"Lovin' You"	Riperton, Rudolph	3:43
16.	"Every Time He Comes Around"	Riperton, Rudolph	3:52
17.	"Love and Its Glory"	Riperton, Rudolph	5:14
18.	"Simple Things"	Riperton, Rudolph	3:41
19.	"Lovin' You (Live reprise)" (featuring George Benson)		4:24

Disc 2
No.	Title	Writer(s)	Length
1.	"Perfect Angel"	Stevie Wonder	3:24
2.	"Adventures in Paradise"	Riperton, Rudolph, Joe Sample	3:14
3.	"Young, Willing and Able"	Riperton, Rudolph, Marlo Henderson	3:46
4.	"Gettin' Ready for Your Love"	Riperton, Rudolph	3:38
5.	"Baby, This Love I Have"	Riperton, Leon Ware, Rudolph	4:11
6.	"Can You Feel What I'm Saying?"	Riperton, Rudolph, Ware	4:15
7.	"Inside My Love"	Riperton, Rudolph	4:45
8.	"Light My Fire" (featuring José Feliciano)	Jim Morrison, Ray Manzarek, Robby Krieger, John Densmore	5:08
9.	"Could It Be I'm in Love"	Riperton, Rudolph	4:18
10.	"Stay in Love"	Riperton, Rudolph	3:16
11.	"Here We Go" (featuring Peabo Bryson)	Riperton, Rudolph, Arthur Phillips	4:04
12.	"Memory Lane"	Riperton, Rudolph, Keni St. Lewis, Gene Dozier	4:25
13.	"Woman of Heart and Mind"	Joni Mitchell	3:43
14.	"Return to Forever"	Rudolph, Randy Waldman	4:09
15.	"Lover and Friend"	Riperton, Rudolph, Lewis, Dozier	4:16
16.	"Give Me Time"	Leonard Caston Jr., Lila Hurtado	4:27
