= From the Roots Up =

Studio album by Delilah
- Released: 30 July 2012
- Recorded: 2010–11
- Genre: Electronica; trip hop; neo soul; PBR&B
- Length: 43:03
- Label: Atlantic, Warner Music
- Producer: Syience, Balistiq, LV, Delilah, Mikey J, Plan B

Singles from From the Roots Up
- 1. "Go" Released: 6 September 2011; 2. "Love You So" Released: 18 December 2011; 3. "Breathe" Released: 7 May 2012; 4. "Inside My Love" Released: 15 July 2012; 5. "Shades of Grey" Released: 16 September 2012

Professional ratings
Review scores
Source	Rating
The Observer	3/5 stars
The Independent	5/5 stars
The Express	3/5 stars
Digital Spy	4/5 stars
NME	7/10 stars
BBC	(Positive)
The Guardian	4/5 stars

From the Roots Up is the debut studio album released by English singer-songwriter Delilah. The album was released on 30 July 2012 via Atlantic Records. The album's release follows the release of four hit singles: "Go", "Love You So", "Breathe", and a cover of Minnie Riperton's "Inside My Love". The album entered the UK Albums Chart at number 5. Following the release of the album, "Shades of Grey" was also issued as a single. Delilah unveiled the album cover and tracklist on 16 May 2012.

== Background ==
In 2008, Delilah chose a Tottenham studio to work on a college project, where she paired with a local producer to record four tracks. A friend who was associated with Choice FM heard the songs and sent them to Island Records. Stoecker caught the attention of industry executives at major record labels. She spent the following weeks arranging interviews, until she was eventually signed to Atlantic Records.

Stoecker was signed to Atlantic Records at the age of 17 and upon the three years to her debut release, gathered a large back catalogue of songs. the singer supported British drum & bass/dubstep act Chase & Status during their two-year UK tour, ending in 2011. Stoecker featured a support vocalist, performing Time and Heartbeat, by soul singer Nneka. The duo claimed after hearing one of her tracks, they thought the singer sounded "fantastic". Stoecker co-wrote the track "Time", along with fellow artists Chase & Status and Plan B, she also provided vocals on the track. The single "Time" was released on 21 April 2011, where it peaked at number 21 on the UK Singles Chart. Her writing credits were added to the track "Don't Be Afraid", on Wretch 32's second album Black and White.

Following the success of the tour with Chase & Status, Stoecker later joined Maverick Sabre as his main support act on his 2011 Autumn tour throughout the UK and Ireland. She was also one of the many artists featured on the BBC 1Xtra live tour.

== Singles ==
"Go" was released as the lead single from the album on 6 September 2011. The song peaked at number 17 on the UK Singles Chart, and at number 9 on the Danish Singles Chart. * "Love You So" was released as the second single from the album on 18 December 2011. The song peaked at number 118 on the UK Singles Chart. "Breathe" was released as the third single from the album on 7 May 2012. The song peaked at number 87 on the UK Singles Chart. "Inside My Love" was released as the fourth single from the album on 15 July 2012, followed by the album fifteen days later. "Shades of Grey" was released as the fifth single from the album on 16 September 2012. "Never Be Another" was due to be released as the sixth single on 25 November 2012, featuring British rapper Devlin. But the single was never released other than from preview on YouTube and SoundCloud, and no reason was given for the single remaining unreleased.

== Reception ==
All music praised the album for its "atmospheric R&B, trip-hop, and singer/songwriter-inflected electronic pop". They continued to praise the "expertly crafted and sophisticated" music "that showcase a nice mix of synthetic, club-oriented sounds as well as more organic instrumentation". Vocally, the critics compared Delilah's voice to Barbadian singer Rihanna along with Sade's more "hushed, smooth style".

== Track listing ==
No.	Title	Writer(s)	Producer(s)	Length
1.	"Never Be Another"	Paloma Ayana, Andrew Stewart-Jones, Ryan Sutherland	Ayana, Balistiq	3:34
2.	"Breathe"	Ayana	Ayana, LV	3:51
3.	"I Can Feel You"	Ayana, Reginald Perry, E. Fitzgerald	Ayana, Syience	2:59
4.	"Shades of Grey"	Ayana, Perry	Ayana, Syience, Balistiq	3:53
5.	"Only You"	Ayana, Ben Drew, Tom Wright-Goss	Ayana, Balistiq	2:56
6.	"Inside My Love"	Minnie Riperton, Leon Ware, Richard Rudolph	Ayana, Mikey J, Natalie Llaina	4:43
7.	"21"	Ayana, Perry, Natalie Llaina	Ayana, Syience, Balistiq	3:22
8.	"Go"	Ayana, Stewart-Jones, Sutherland, Hawk Wolinski	Ayana, Balistiq	3:38
9.	"So Irate"	Ayana, Perry, Burrows	Ayana, Andy Burrows	4:21
10.	"Love You So"	Ayana, Perry, Natalie Llaina, Finley Quaye	Ayana, Syience, Balistiq	3:16
11.	"Insecure"	Ayana, Natalie Llaina	Ayana, LV	3:42
12.	"Tabitha, Mummy and Me"	Ayana	Ayana	4:01

Deluxe Edition Bonus Tracks
No.	Title	Writer(s)	Producer(s)	Length
13.	"Cinnababy"	Ayana	Ayana, Balistiq	4:16
14.	"See You Again"	Ayana, Perry	Ayana, Syience	4:03
15.	"Disrespect"	Ayana, Stewart-Jones, Sutherland, Autumn Rowe	Balistiq	3:39

HMV Exclusive Bonus Mixtape CD
No.	Title	Writer(s)	{{{extra_column}}}	Length
1.	"Insecure" (MJ Cole Remix)	Ayana	Ayana, LV	3:42
2.	"Breathe" (LV Remix)	Ayana	Ayana, LV	3:51
3.	"Love You So" (Joe Goddard Remix)	Ayana, Perry, Finley Quaye	Ayana, Syience, Balistiq	4:21
4.	"So Irate" (Andy Burrows Dub)	Ayana, Perry, Burrows	Ayana, Andy Burrows	4:21
5.	"Never Be Another" (S.P.Y Remix)	Ayana, Andrew Stewart-Jones, Ryan Sutherland	Ayana, Balistiq	3:34
6.	"Go" (SpectraSoul Remix)	Ayana, Stewart-Jones, Sutherland, Hawk Wolinski	Ayana, Balistiq	3:38
7.	"Time" (featuring Chase & Status)	Ayana, William Kennard, Saul Milton, Ben Drew	Chase & Status	3:38

== Personnel ==
Credits for From the Roots Up adapted from Allmusic

- Paloma Ayana - Composer, Producer, Vocals
- Balistiq - Additional Production, Piano, Producer, Programming
- Ben Baptie - Mixing Assistant
- Joe Barbo - A&R
- Chris Booth - Guitar
- Andy Burrows - Bass, Composer, Drums, Guitar, Producer
- Neil Comber - Engineer, Mixing
- Delilah - Primary Artist
- Ben Drew - Composer
- Tom Elmhirst - Mixing
- Fiona Garden - Photography
- Rosabella Gregory - Piano
- Andy Hayes - Design, Layout
- Charlie Hugall - Mixing, Producer
- Chris Hugall - Mixing
- Kes Ingoldsby - Management
- Jacqui Lubin - Management
- L.V. - Producer
- Mikey J - Producer
- Mazen Murad - Mastering
- Conor O'Mahony - A&R
- Reginald Perry - Composer
- Plan B - Producer
- Finley Quaye - Composer
- Dean Reid - Engineer
- Minnie Ripperton - Composer
- Tom Rogerson - Piano
- Richard J. Rudolph - -Composer
- Paul Samuels - A&R
- Andrew Stewart - Composer
- Ryan Sutherland - Composer
- Dan Vinci - Engineer
- Leon Ware - Composer
- Will Wortley - A&R
- Tom Wright-Goss - Composer

== Chart performance ==
Chart (2012)	Peak position
Scottish Albums Chart	17
UK Albums Chart	5

== Release history ==
Region	Date	Format	Label
United Kingdom	30 July 2012	Digital download, CD	Atlantic, Warner Music
