= Shades of Grey (Delilah song) =

Single by Delilah

from the album From the Roots Up
- Released: 14 September 2012
- Recorded: 2011
- Genre: Neo soul, ambient, trip hop, R&B
- Length: 3:53
- Label: Warner Music
- Songwriter(s): Paloma Ayana, Reginald Perry
- Producer(s): Ayana, Syience (additional production: Balistiq)

Delilah singles chronology
"Inside My Love" (2012)	"Shades of Grey" (2012)	"Never Be Another" (2012)

"Shades of Grey" is a single recorded by British singer Delilah. The song was released as a digital download single on 18 December 2011 in the United Kingdom as the fifth single from her debut album, From the Roots Up. The song was written and produced by Paloma Ayana and Reginald Perry.

== Music video ==
A music video to accompany the release of "Shades of Grey" was first released onto YouTube on 20 August 2012 at a total length of four minutes. As of October 2016, the video has received over 1.47 million views.

== Track listing ==
Album version
No.	Title	Length
1.	"Shades of Grey"	3:53

UK Digital download
No.	Title	Length
1.	"Shades of Grey" (MJ Cole Remix)	5:45
2.	"Shades of Grey" (MJ Cole Dub)	5:32
3.	"Shades of Grey" (SpectraSoul Remix)	5:24
4.	"Shades of Grey" (SpectraSoul Remix Instrumental)	5:24

== Chart performance ==
Chart (2012)	Peak position
UK Singles (Official Charts Company)	119

== Release history ==
Country	Release date	Format	Label
United Kingdom	14 September 2012	Digital download	Warner Music
