= Stay in Love =

Studio album by Minnie Riperton
- Released: February 1977
- Recorded: March–April, October 1976
- Studios: Total Experience (Hollywood, California); Paramount (Hollywood, California); United Western (Hollywood, California)
- Genres: Soul; disco; funk
- Length: 37:23
- Label: Epic
- Producer: Freddie Perren

Minnie Riperton chronology
Adventures in Paradise (1975)	Stay in Love (1977)	Minnie (1979)

Singles from Stay in Love
- 1. "Stick Together (Part 1) / (Part 2)" Released: February 27, 1977; 2. "Wouldn't Matter Where You Are / Gettin' Ready for Your Love" Released: May 25, 1977; 3. "Young, Willing and Able / How Could I Love You More" Released: July 16, 1977

Stay in Love (full title: Stay in Love: A Romantic Fantasy Set to Music) is the fourth studio album by American singer Minnie Riperton, released under Epic Records. The album features the hits "Young Willing and Able" and the Stevie Wonder collaboration "Stick Together". Unlike her previous works, the soft soul elements here tend to fade, replaced by a more upbeat disco sound which was the musical trend at the time. "Stick Together" peaked at no. 23 on Billboard's Hot Dance Play, an alternate version known as "Stick Together (Part One)" reached no. 57 on the U.S. Hot Black Singles chart.

Stay in Love was Riperton's first disco effort and the only of her releases predominantly in the genre. It was also her last album for Epic Records; she subsequently signed to Capitol Records (which she recorded two albums during her lifetime). Moreover, this was Riperton's first album since her debut, Come to My Garden, that didn't feature her husband Richard Rudolph as a producer or co-producer, although Rudolph still co-wrote the songs. In his place as producer was Motown veteran Freddie Perren in his only collaboration with Riperton.

== Critical reception ==
Professional ratings
Review scores
Source	Rating
AllMusic	3/5 stars
The Virgin Encyclopedia of R&B and Soul	2/5 stars

The Bay State Banner wrote that Riperton's "ethereal voice is perfect for the romantic mood."

== Track listing ==
All tracks written by Minnie Riperton and Richard Rudolph, unless otherwise noted.

Side one
No.	Title	Writer(s)	Length
1.	"Young Willing and Able"	Riperton, Rudolph, Marlo Henderson	3:44
2.	"Could It Be I'm in Love"		4:17
3.	"Oh Darlin' ... Life Goes On"	Riperton, Rudolph, Freddie Perren	3:50
4.	"Can You Feel What I'm Saying?"	Riperton, Rudolph, Leon Ware	4:17
5.	"Gettin' Ready for Your Love"		3:38

Side two
No.	Title	Writer(s)	Length
1.	"Stick Together"	Riperton, Rudolph, Stevie Wonder	6:18
2.	"Wouldn't Matter Where You Are"	Riperton, Rudolph, Henderson	4:00
3.	"How Could I Love You More"		4:05
4.	"Stay in Love"		3:16

== Personnel ==
- Minnie Riperton - vocals, backing vocals
- Don Peake - string and horn arrangements
- Odell Brown - string arrangements on "Can You Feel What I'm Saying?" and "Stay in Love"
- Wade Marcus - string and horn arrangements on "Gettin' Ready for Your Love" and "Wouldn't Matter Where You Are"
- Sonny Burke, John Barnes - keyboards
- Dick Rudolph, Tommy Tedesco - acoustic guitar
- Bob "Boogie" Bowles, Marlo Henderson - guitar
- Scott Edwards, Wilton Felder, Chuck Rainey - bass guitar
- James Gadson - drums
- Paulinho da Costa, Bob Zimmitti, Joe Clayton - percussion
- Plas Johnson - flute on "Gettin' Ready for Your Love"
- Billy Ford, Carolyn Dennis, Carolyn Majors Caston, Jim Gilstrap, John Lehman - backing vocals
- Pam Grier, Vicki Alley, Minnie Riperton, The Pastells - finger snaps on "Stick Together"

Technical

- Larry Miles - recording and remixing engineer
- Freddie Perren - rhythm arrangements, production
- Irving Azoff - director
- Kosh - design
- David Alexander - photography
- Kevin Gray - mastering

Production credits taken from album liner notes.

== Charts ==
Chart (1977)	Peak position
U.S. Billboard Pop Albums	71
U.S. Billboard Black Albums	19

Singles

Year	Title	US Dance	US R&B
1977	"Stick Together"	23	—
1977	"Stick Together (Part one)"	—	57
