= Love You So (Delilah song) =

Single by Delilah

from the album From the Roots Up
- Released: 18 December 2011
- Recorded: 2011
- Genre: R&B; trip hop; synthpop
- Length: 3:16
- Label: Warner Music
- Songwriters: Paloma Stoecker, Finley Quaye, Reggie Perry, Samantha Perry
- Producer: Syience (additional production: Balistiq)

Delilah singles chronology
"Go" (2011)	"Love You So" (2011)	"Breathe" (2012)

"Love You So" is the second single recorded by British singer Delilah. The song, produced by Syience, contains a sample of ''Even After All'' by Finley Quaye, taken from his 1997 album, Maverick a Strike. The song was released as a digital download single on 18 December 2011 in the United Kingdom from her debut album, From the Roots Up.

== Music video ==
A music video to accompany the release of "Love You So" was first released onto YouTube on 29 November 2011 at a total length of three minutes and twenty-seven seconds.

== Critical reception ==
Robert Copsey of Digital Spy gave the song a positive review stating:

Her latest effort sees the 19-year-old carving out her niche a little deeper. Teaming up with Syience, 'Love You So' is another hypnotic offering that locks you in a trance from the off. "You know I left you lonely/ You always leave me with doubt," she confesses over pacey tribal beats with a smoky yet familiar-sounding vocal. The result is a classy pop number that transforms her from an expendable to a force in her own right.

== Track listing ==
UK Digital download
No.	Title	Writer(s)	Length
1.	"Love You So"	Stoecker, Quaye, Perry	3:16
2.	"I'll Be Waiting"	Stoecker, Oliver Jones, Stewart-Jones, Sutherland	3:08
3.	"Mean to Me"	Stoecker, Guy Chambers	3:31
4.	"Love You So" (Joe Goddard Remix)	Stoecker, Quaye, Perry	3:55
5.	"Love You So" (Lenzman Remix)	Stoecker, Quaye, Perry	4:00

== Chart performance ==
Chart (2011)	Peak position
UK Singles (Official Charts Company)	118

== Release history ==
Country	Release date	Format	Label
United Kingdom	18 December 2011	Digital download	Warner Music
