= Adventures in Paradise (Minnie Riperton album) =

Studio album by Minnie Riperton
- Released: May 22, 1975
- Recorded: January–March 1975
- Studios: Wally Heider Studio Three, Los Angeles
- Genres: Soul; R&B; smooth soul
- Length: 40:12
- Label: Epic
- Producers: Minnie Riperton; Richard Rudolph; Stewart Levine

Minnie Riperton chronology
Perfect Angel (1974)	Adventures in Paradise (1975)	Stay in Love (1977)

Singles from Adventures in Paradise
- 1. "Inside My Love / Don't Let Anyone Bring You Down" Released: July 15, 1975; 2. "When It Comes Down to It / Minnie's Lament (UK)" Released: October 6, 1975; 3. "Simple Things / Minnie's Lament" Released: November 19, 1975; 4. "Adventures in Paradise / When It Comes Down to It" Released: January 9, 1976

Professional ratings
Review scores
Source	Rating
AllMusic	4/5 stars
BBC	(favourable)

Adventures in Paradise is the third studio album by Minnie Riperton, issued in May 1975 by Epic Records. The album rose to No. 5 on the Billboard Top Soul Albums chart and No. 18 on the Billboard 200 chart.

== Background ==
After "Lovin' You" and Perfect Angel finished their chart run, Epic wanted a follow-up disc, and fast. With previous co-producer Stevie Wonder busy recording his Songs in the Key of Life (which Minnie would also turn up on, singing backup on "Ordinary Pain"), Minnie and husband Richard Rudolph hired Stewart Levine to co-produce her next album. More songs came from the Riperton/Rudolph camp as well as collaborations with Jazz Crusader Joe Sample and songwriter Leon Ware (who was enjoying a hot streak thanks to his work on Marvin Gaye’s album I Want You). Guitarist Larry Carlton was brought in as an arranger. The result, Adventures In Paradise, took on a mellow soul-jazz tone.

The album was a standard recording but available in two formats: quadraphonic and stereo. Epic Records anticipated a soul funky sequel, using Family Stone and Tower of Power horn section, which would have been released in November 1975. However, the sessions were never released due to legal issues.

== Music ==
The album's best known song is the sensual "Inside My Love". Riperton made it quite clear during the track's initial release that the song wasn't about a woman asking a man to have sex with her - it was about going deeper than that, attaining true intimacy. "Inside My Love" went to number 26 R&B during the summer of 1975, but stalled at #76 on the pop listings. Much of pop radio balked at playing the single due to the lyrical content (“Do you wanna ride, inside my love[...]”) even though Leon Ware claimed that the words were inspired by a church preacher he heard speak when he was a child (the minister said, “let us come into the house of the Lord”).

"Love and Its Glory" was never a hit, but it is an epic love song of two teens struggling to be together, despite parental objections. The girl in the song is named Maya, which is the name of Riperton's daughter.

== Artwork ==
The cover of Adventures in Paradise features Minnie sitting serenely next to a lion. Though the album photo session was calm, things spiraled out of control on the set of a commercial that recreated the cover with a different lion. The animal lunged at Minnie without any provocation. Fortunately, the lion’s tamer was on the set and the lion was quickly subdued.

== Track listing ==
All tracks written by Minnie Riperton and Richard Rudolph, unless otherwise noted.

Side One
No.	Title	Writer(s)	Length
1.	"Baby, This Love I Have"	Minnie Riperton, Leon Ware, Richard Rudolph	3:44
2.	"Feelin' That Your Feelin's Right"	Riperton, Ware, Rudolph	4:22
3.	"When It Comes Down to It"		3:24
4.	"Minnie's Lament"		4:10
5.	"Love and Its Glory"	Riperton, Ed Brown, Rudolph	5:10

Side Two
No.	Title	Writer(s)	Length
6.	"Adventures in Paradise"	Riperton, Joe Sample, Rudolph	3:15
7.	"Inside My Love"	Riperton, Ware, Rudolph	4:45
8.	"Alone in Brewster Bay"		4:25
9.	"Simple Things"		3:44
10.	"Don't Let Anyone Bring You Down"		2:55

== Personnel ==
- Minnie Riperton – vocals
- Larry Carlton – guitar, arrangements, conductor
- Ed Brown – bass
- Sid Sharp – strings
- Stewart Levine – director
- Dorothy Ashby – harp
- Jim Gordon – drums, percussion
- Rik Pekkonen – engineer
- Dean Parks (tracks: 6, 7, 9), Richard Rudolph – guitar
- Joe Sample – keyboards
- Doug Sax – mastering
- Kenneth McGowan – photography
- Producer – Minnie Riperton, Richard Rudolph, Stewart Levine
- Recorded By – Gary Starr
- Jim Horn, Tom Scott – saxophones
- Masaharu Yoshioka – liner notes

== Charts ==
Chart (1975)	Peak position
Australia (Kent Music Report)	54
U.S. Billboard Pop Albums	18
U.S. Billboard Black Albums	5

Singles

Year	Title	US Pop	US R&B
1975	"Inside My Love"	76	26
1975	"Simple Things"	—	70
1976	"Adventures in Paradise"	—	72
