= Minnie (album) =

Studio album by Minnie Riperton
- Released: May 9, 1979
- Recorded: 6 March – September 1978
- Studio: A&M (Hollywood)
- Genres: R&B; soul
- Length: 35:47
- Label: Capitol
- Producers: Minnie Riperton; Dick Rudolph; Henry Lewy

Minnie Riperton chronology
| Stay in Love (1977) | Minnie (1979) | Love Lives Forever (1980) |

Singles from Minnie
- 1. "Memory Lane / I'm a Woman" Released: April 8, 1979; 2. "Lover and Friend / Return to Forever" Released: August 26, 1979

Minnie is the fifth studio album by American R&B/jazz singer Minnie Riperton, and her first with Capitol Records. With a new record deal under her belt and a guarantee from the label of priority marketing and promotion, Minnie went right to work on what would be her final album. With husband Richard Rudolph, Keni St. Lewis, Gene Dozier, Randy Waldman, Marlo Henderson and Bill Thedford contributing songs, the album served as Minnie’s final statement to the music world and fans, as she died of cancer two months after its release.

== Background ==
Minnie brought son Marc and daughter Maya Rudolph into the studio to sing background on "Dancin' & Actin' Crazy," while the tender "Lover & Friend" (featuring a reunion with Stevie Wonder, once again under the pseudonym of El Toro Negro) was the perfect ode to her relationship with Richard. Minnie was at her most playful self on her remake of the Doors' "Light My Fire", a duet with José Feliciano (who had a hit with his own version of this rock classic in 1968). It's been said that the reason we don't hear José until the second half of the song is because he just happened to be at the studio when it was being recorded and popped in.

When not recording, Minnie was busy as the national spokesperson for the American Cancer Society, lobbying the cause for early breast cancer detection. As a result of her efforts, she was presented with the A.C.S. Courage Award at the White House by President Jimmy Carter. While promoting this album, TV appearances kept her busy – The Mike Douglas Show, The Merv Griffin Show, The Tonight Show. Despite her radiant and expressive face, the cameras could not hide how the cancer was ravaging her body. During her last appearance on The Mike Douglas Show, her right arm was in a fixed position from the cancer's progression.

== Critical reception ==
Professional ratings
Review scores
| Source | Rating |
|---|---|
| AllMusic | 3/5 stars |

AllMusic's Craig Lytle commented, "While Riperton's voice was as silky as the incomparable Billie Holiday's, she had the innate ability to controllably explode into higher octaves without forsaking the beauty of her voice. This admirable quality elevates her to a class of her own... This album was released in the year in which the supreme songstress passed (1979). However, she bestowed upon the listener her gift of voice with a collection of fine songs."

== Singles ==
The first single released from the album was "Memory Lane". A music video was filmed for the song and released on the Capitol Records home video Revised Soul which also featured Riperton's labelmates at the time, Tavares, Natalie Cole and A Taste of Honey. The video was filmed on May 25, 1979 - a little over a month before her death from cancer on July 12, 1979. Posthumous singles included "Lover and Friend" and "Dancin' & Actin' Crazy".

== Track listing ==
Side one
| No. | Title | Writer(s) | Length |
|---|---|---|---|
| 1. | "Memory Lane" | Minnie Riperton, Richard Rudolph, Keni St. Lewis, Gene Dozier | 4:23 |
| 2. | "Lover and Friend" | Riperton, Richard Rudolph, Keni St. Lewis, Gene Dozier | 4:13 |
| 3. | "Return to Forever" | Rudolph, Randy Waldman | 4:07 |
| 4. | "Dancin' & Actin' Crazy" | Rudolph, Randy Waldman | 6:03 |

Side two
| No. | Title | Writer(s) | Length |
|---|---|---|---|
| 5. | "Love Hurts" | Riperton, Richard Rudolph, Marlo Henderson | 3:35 |
| 6. | "Never Existed Before" | Riperton, Richard Rudolph, Bill Thedford | 4:17 |
| 7. | "I'm a Woman" | Riperton, Richard Rudolph, Bill Thedford | 4:00 |
| 8. | "Light My Fire" (featuring José Feliciano) | Jim Morrison, Ray Manzarek, Robby Krieger, John Densmore | 5:09 |

== Personnel ==
- Minnie Riperton - vocals
- Mitch Holder, Phil Upchurch, Art Phillips, Marlo Henderson - guitar
- Oscar Castro-Neves - acoustic guitar
- Abraham Laboriel, Chuck Rainey, David Hungate - bass guitar
- Jeremy Lubbock, Randy Waldman - electric piano, synthesizer
- Harvey Mason, Alex Acuña, Leon "Ndugu" Chancler - drums
- Paulinho da Costa, Steve Forman, Master Henry Gibson - percussion
- Victor Feldman - vibraphone, piano
- Claudio Slon - drums, cymbals
- Jerry Hey, Kim Hutchcroft, Larry Williams, David Duke, Richard Perissi, Vincent DeRosa - horns
- Hubert Laws, Buddy Collette, Jerome Richardson, Sheridon Stokes, William Green, Tom Scott - flute
- Bill Reichenbach - trombone
- Gerald Vinci - violin
- Bili Thedford, Dani McCormick, Venetta Fields, Dali Shelby, Sandra Riperton Brewer, Sidney Barnes - backing vocals

Technical

- Charles William Bush - photography

== Charts ==
| Chart (1979) | Peak position |
|---|---|
| Australia (Kent Music Report) | 60 |
| U.S. Billboard Pop Albums | 29 |
| U.S. Billboard Black Albums | 5 |

Singles

| Year | Title | US R&B | Canada RPM AC |
|---|---|---|---|
| 1979 | "Memory Lane" | 16 | – |
| 1979 | "Memory Lane" | – | 14 |
| 1979 | "Lover and Friend" | 20 | – |
