= Breathe (Delilah song) =

Single by Delilah

from the album From the Roots Up
- Released: 13 May 2012
- Recorded: 2011
- Genre: Trip hop; neo-soul; PBR&B
- Length: 3:48
- Label: Warner Music
- Songwriter: Paloma Stoecker
- Producers: Delilah, LV

Delilah singles chronology
"Love You So" (2011)	"Breathe" (2012)	"Inside My Love" (2012)

"Breathe" is the third single recorded by British singer Delilah. The song was released as a digital download single on 7 May 2012 in the United Kingdom from her debut album, From the Roots Up. The song peaked to number 87 on the UK Singles Chart.

== Music video ==
A music video to accompany the release of "Breathe" was first released onto YouTube on 12 April 2012 at a total length of four minutes.

== Track listing ==
UK Digital download
No.	Title	Length
1.	"Breathe"	3:48
2.	"Breathe" (feat. Liam Bailey)	3:48
3.	"Breathe" (Sub Zero Remix)	3:42
4.	"Breathe" (LV Remix)	4:36
5.	"Breathe" (BBC Live Version)	3:55

An Emalkay remix of the song was used on the trailer to the show Dynamo: Magician Impossible, it was also uploaded on a YouTube channel called UKFDubstep. It has 2.6 million views as of August 2019.

== Chart performance ==
Chart (2012)	Peak position
UK Singles (Official Charts Company)	87

== Release history ==
Country	Release date	Format	Label
United Kingdom	7 May 2012	Digital download	Warner Music
