= Les Fleur =

Song by Minnie Riperton

from the album Come to My Garden
- Released: September 23, 1970
- Genre: Soul, psychedelia gospel jazz
- Length: 3:19
- Label: GRT
- Songwriters: Richard Rudolph; Charles Stepney
- Producer: Charles Stepney

"Les Fleur" (also known as "Les Fleurs") (Note: The original record label listed the song as "Les Fleur," although reissues and compilations use the title "Les Fleurs.") (transl. "The Flowers") is a song by American singer-songwriter Minnie Riperton, released as the opening song of her 1970 debut studio album Come to My Garden.

== Background and recording ==
"Les Fleurs" was written by Charles Stepney, who also produced the song, and Richard Rudolph, Riperton’s husband. Pianist Ramsey Lewis had previously recorded a version of the song as "Les Fleur" on his 1968 album Maiden Voyage.

== Music ==
The song features Riperton singing from the anthropomorphized perspective of a flower. The lyrics contain themes of renewal and rebirth and have been interpreted to be about Jesus. It contains layered vocals and an orchestral backing from the string section of the Chicago Symphony Orchestra. Willie Aron of Hits described it as a "chamber-soul masterpiece" and a "trippy pastoral [...] that blossoms into an anthemic chorus."

In 2024, Audrey Connelly of Atwood Magazine wrote that the "song was written during the summer of love" and is "full of floral imagery and soft psychedelic freedom." In 2024, Jason King, dean of the USC Thornton School of Music, stated that the song's lyrics about the life cycle of a flower, evoke pastoralism and nostalgia.

== Legacy ==
Country soul singer Yola and alternative pop singer Caroline Polachek have called the song an inspiration for their own music. Electronic music group 4hero released a remix to the song for their album Creating Patterns. The Guardian ranked the song as Riperton's second best song.

The song has been used in films and TV shows, such as Inherent Vice, Us, The Idea of You, Back to Black, Atlanta, Gaslit, and Them. Isle of Any featured the song in a January 2026 ChatGPT commercial.

== Charts ==
Chart	Peak position
UK Physical Singles (Official Charts Company)	34
UK Vinyl Singles (Official Charts Company)	34
