= Go (Delilah song) =

Single by Delilah

from the album From the Roots Up
- Released: 6 September 2011
- Recorded: 2011
- Genre: Trip hop; PBR&B; electronic
- Length: 3:33
- Label: Warner Music
- Songwriter(s): Paloma Stoecker, Andrew Stewart-Jones, Ryan Sutherland, Hawk Wolinski
- Producer(s): Balistiq

Delilah singles chronology
"Time" (2011)	"Go" (2011)	"Love You So" (2011)

"Go" is the debut single recorded by British singer Delilah. The song was released as a digital download single on 6 September 2011 in the United Kingdom from her debut album From the Roots Up. Delilah featured on Chase & Status's hit "Time" earlier this year, which reached number 21 on the UK Singles Chart.

The song features lyrics from the 1983 Chaka Khan hit, "Ain't Nobody" ("The next thing I felt was you / Holding me close / What am I gonna do? / I let myself go"). In an interview with Pyromag in September 2011, Delilah mentioned that Chaka Khan has heard the track and thought it was "genius".

== Music video ==
A music video to accompany the release of "Go" was first released onto YouTube on 1 September 2011 at a total length of three minutes and forty-seven seconds. The music video was filmed in the Whitechapel district of London.

== Track listing ==
UK Digital download
No.	Title	Writer(s)	Length
1.	"Go"	Stoecker, Stewart-Jones, Sutherland, Wolinski	3:33
2.	"I Can Feel You"	Stoecker, Perry	3:19
3.	"Breathe"	Stoecker	3:56
4.	"Hater"	Stoecker, Salaam Remi	4:18

== Charts ==
=== Weekly charts ===
Chart (2011)	Peak position
Denmark (Tracklisten)	9
Scotland (OCC)	21
UK Hip Hop/R&B (OCC)	4
UK Singles (OCC)	17

=== Year-end charts ===
Chart (2011)	Position
UK Singles (OCC)	149

== Certifications ==
Region	Certification	Certified units/sales
United Kingdom (BPI)	Silver	200,000^{‡}
^{‡} Sales+streaming figures based on certification alone.

== Release history ==
Country	Release date	Format	Label
United Kingdom	6 September 2011	Digital download	Warner Music
