= Delilah (musician) =

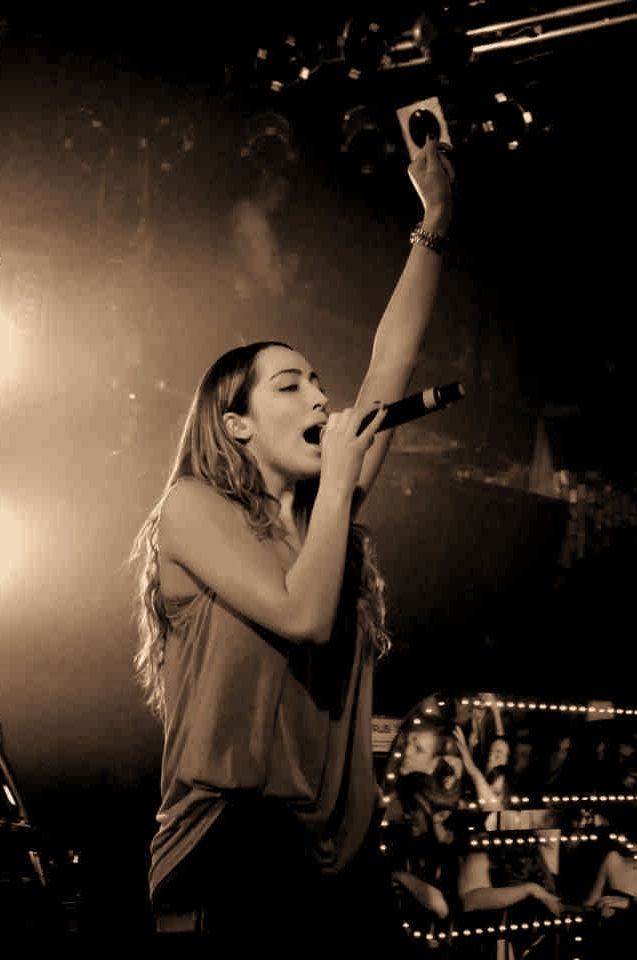
- Delilah performing in late 2011

Background information
- Also known as: Delilah
- Born: Paloma Ayana Stoecker; 23 September 1991 (age 35); Paris, France
- Origin: Camden, London, England
- Genres: Pop; electronica; trip hop; PBR&B; ambient; soul
- Occupation: Singer-songwriter
- Instruments: Vocals, piano
- Years active: 2007–present
- Labels: Atlantic, Warner Music Group
- Website: delilahofficial.com

Paloma Ayana Stoecker (born 23 September 1991), who records under the name Delilah, is an English singer-songwriter. Born in Paris, France, Delilah moved to Camden, London, England, at an early age where she later attended City and Islington College. After sending demos to Island Records she caught the attention of industry executives at major record labels and signed to Atlantic Records at the age of seventeen.

In 2011, she collaborated with Chase & Status on the single "Time". Her first solo song "Go", was officially released on 25 September 2011, whilst previously being available for digital download. Her debut album From the Roots Up was released on 30 July 2012 and peaked at No. 5 in the UK Albums Chart.

== Early life ==
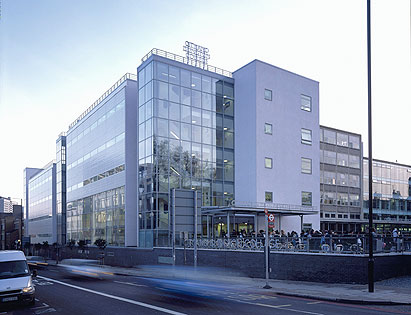
Delilah studied at City and Islington College.

Delilah was born Paloma Ayana Stoecker, on 23 September 1990 in Paris, France. After her parents separated when she was still young, she moved to Camden, London, with her mother where she then grew up. She has Nigerian, Jamaican, Cuban and English heritage. Few years later, Paloma Server's mother had involvement with the MOBOs during the 90s Her late step-father Jesse Stoecker was a DJ, who also owned an independent record label named Shakedown Sounds promoting British bands and a night club showcasing live music. Delilah began taking singing seriously following the death of her step-father who died in an accident in 2002. The singer's first instrument was the piano where she wrote her first song at age 12. She also has a sister called Tabitha, a gold medal-winning athlete in skeleton.

Delilah attended various secondary schools including Portland Place School, before continuing schooling at City and Islington College, studying for a BTEC National Diploma in Music but dropped out a few months later. She stated her choice for the college saying "I didn't want to go to somewhere like the BRIT School, I didn't want to be that structured."

== Career ==
=== 2008–11: Career beginnings and her breakthrough ===
In 2008, Delilah chose a Tottenham studio to work on a college project, where she paired with a local producer to record four tracks. A friend who was associated with Choice FM heard the songs and sent them to Island Records. Stoecker caught the attention of industry executives at major record labels. She spent the following weeks arranging interviews, until she was eventually signed to Atlantic Records.

Delilah was signed to Atlantic Records, at the age of 17 and upon the three years to her debut release, gathered a large back catalogue of songs. the singer supported British drum & bass/dubstep act Chase & Status during their two-year UK tour, ending in 2011. Delilah featured a support vocalist, performing Time and Heartbeat, by soul singer Nneka. The duo claimed after hearing one of her tracks, they thought the singer sounded "fantastic". Delilah co-wrote the track "Time", along with fellow artists Chase & Status and Plan B, she also provided vocals on the track. The single "Time" was released on 21 April 2011, where it peaked at number 21 on the UK singles chart. Her writing credits were added to the track "Don't Be Afraid", on Wretch 32's second album Black and White.

Following the success of the tour with Chase & Status, Delilah later joined Maverick Sabre as his main support act on his 2011 Autumn tour throughout the UK and Ireland. She was also amongst the many artists featured on the BBC 1Xtra live tour.

=== 2012–present: From the Roots Up ===
Delilah's debut studio album, From the Roots Up was released on 30 July 2012 The record features production from Syience, Balistiq and Hyperdub label signee LV. Delilah also serves as a co-producer on the album. . In the United Kingdom, the album debuted at number five on the UK Albums Chart The album also debuted in the top twenty of the Scottish Albums Chart peaking at seventeen. The lead single from the album, "Go" was digitally released on 6 September 2011. The track peaked at number 17 on the UK singles chart. The single features a vocal sample interpolation from Chaka Khan's 1983 hit "Ain't Nobody", plus original writing from herself. Chaka Khan has since heard the track, labelling it "genius". The follow-up single "Love You So" was released on 19 December 2011 through Atlantic Records in December 2011. Delilah released her fourth single on 16 July 2012, a cover of Minnie Riperton's "Inside My Love". Delilah shot the video to "Inside My Love" with acclaimed video director Jake Nava, most famously known for his collaborations with Beyoncé and Kanye West.

The singer released her first mixtape, 2-4am in February 2012 as a free download from her website. The 8 track compilation features unreleased material, including a remix of 2011 single "Love You So", by Joe Goddard of Hot Chip. Her third single "Breathe" was released on 14 May 2012.

The singer sang with Emeli Sandé at London's KOKO as part of MTV's Brand New for 2012. Throughout the spring of 2012, Delilah enrolled on her first headline tour which began 14 April 2012, in Glasgow's O2 ABC 2. The tour ended on 24 April 2012 selling out London's KOKO venue. During October 2012, Delilah embarked on her second headline UK tour concluding with a sell out show at London's Shepards Bush Empire supported by Uk rapper Wiley. Delilah opened a number of tour dates for Grammy Award-winning artist Prince on his 2012 Australian tour in May.

Delilah has been working on her second album for a couple of years. The album is the first since she became independent of her label and has been supported by the #NoFilter tour, which began in August 2014 and went to London, Manchester, Brighton, Bristol and Birmingham. She unveiled several new songs which are part of her upcoming album and also a free mixtape which is expected soon. Delilah has spoken out about her plans to spend time in the US, recording with Prince and about her upcoming album during the tour. Delilah was featured on "Way Back Home" and "Affirmation III" from the album Art Official Age by Prince and also released a song with Etta Bond 'Bubble'.

== Artistry ==
Delilah cites that her album debut From the Roots Up, is influenced by the contemporary music scene, with genres ranging from dub, dubstep, acoustic and drum & bass. On describing her sound the singer says her music is dark, soulful, melodic pop.

Delilah has been described as the missing link between Sade and The xx. She has also been influenced by and compared to Canadian singer Alanis Morissette. Speaking of her influences in an interview the singer credits Buena Vista Social Club, Portishead, Ella Fitzgerald, Metalheadz, Nine Inch Nails, Chaka Khan, Roy Ayers, Aaliyah and Sade as some of her musical influences. They, along with others, played a big part in her musical upbringing and this influences the songs she writes and co-produces.

== Discography ==
=== Albums ===
Title	Album details	Peak chart positions	
Title	Album details	UK	SCO
From the Roots Up	Released: 30 July 2012; Label: Warner Music Group; Formats: CD, digital download	5	17

=== Mixtape ===
Title	Details	Track List
2-4am	Released: 2012; Format: digital download; Free Download from Delilah's website	1. "Never Be Another"; 2. "Love You So" (Joe Goddard's Dub You So Mix); 3. "The Gospel"; 4. "Closer"; 5. "Love Drug"; 6. "Lay By"; 7. "Wish I Had Your Life"; 8. "21"

=== Singles ===
Title	Year	Peak chart positions					Certifications	Album
Title	Year	UK	UK R&B	BEL (FLA)	DEN	SCO	Certifications	Album
"Go"	2011	17	4	–	9	21	BPI: Silver	From the Roots Up
"Love You So"	2011	118	–	73	—	—		From the Roots Up
"Breathe"	2012	87	—	—	—	—		From the Roots Up
"Inside My Love"	2012	60	—	—	—	—		From the Roots Up
"Shades of Grey"	2012	119	—	—	—	—		From the Roots Up
"Never Be Another" (featuring Devlin)	2012	167	—	—	—	—		From the Roots Up
"If I Stay" (with Disciples)	2024	—	—	—	—	—		TBA
"—" denotes a title that did not chart, or was not released in that territory.

==== As featured artist ====
Title	Year	Peak chart positions			Certifications	Album
Title	Year	UK	UK DAN	BEL (FLA)	Certifications	Album
"Time" (Chase & Status featuring Delilah)	2011	21	6	14	BPI: Platinum	No More Idols
"—" denotes a title that did not chart, or was not released in that territory.

=== Guest appearances ===
Title	Year	Other artist(s)	Album
"Too Deep"	2015	RITUAL	From the City to the Wilderness – EP
