= Love Lives Forever =

Studio album by Minnie Riperton
- Released: August 11, 1980
- Recorded: 1978 (Minnie's Vocals); 1980 (overdubs)
- Genre: R&B; soul
- Length: 37:33
- Label: Capitol
- Producer: Richard Rudolph; Johnny Pate

Minnie Riperton chronology
Minnie (1979)	Love Lives Forever (1980)	The Best of Minnie Riperton (1981)

Singles from Love Lives Forever
- 1. "Here We Go / Return to Forever" Released: July 21, 1980; 2. "Give Me Time / Island in the Sun" Released: January 18, 1981

Professional ratings
Review scores
Source	Rating
AllMusic	3/5 stars

Love Lives Forever is the sixth and final studio album by the American soul singer Minnie Riperton. Released posthumously in 1980, it was co-produced by her husband Richard Rudolph and released on her then-label Capitol Records. It consists of tracks that she recorded in 1978 during vocal sessions before her death on July 12, 1979, and music recorded by others after her early death.

== Background ==
All of Riperton's vocals were stripped from earlier, original, music tracks and the backing tracks were completely redone. It was completed with new musicians, vocalists and arrangements. The producer, Quincy Jones, described the project as "keeping the bridge, but moving the water".

The back cover of the vinyl album has a quote about Riperton from each artist who participated and their signatures (a thumb print for Stevie Wonder). Wonder's quote inspired the album title: "I miss you because I cannot touch you...but then again, I guess that I can because you're touching me...so, Love lives forever".

== Commercial reception ==
The song "Here We Go" is a duet with the R&B singer Peabo Bryson, released as a single which entered the top twenty and peaked at no. 14 on the Billboard R&B Songs chart. It also has additional vocals by Roberta Flack. The second song released from the album as a single was "Give Me Time", featuring Stevie Wonder on harmonica. It peaked at no. 72 on the Billboard R&B Songs chart.

== Track listing ==
Side one

1. "Here We Go" (Minnie Riperton, Richard Rudolph, Art Phillips) – 6:12
  - Peabo Bryson – vocals (duet)
  - Roberta Flack – additional vocals
  - Tom Scott – tenor sax solo
2. "I'm in Love Again" (Riperton, Rudolph) – 4:05
  - Michael Jackson – additional vocals
  - Hubert Laws – flute solo
3. "Strange Affair" (Riperton, Rudolph, Marlo Henderson) – 8:55
  - Michael Boddicker – synthesizer

Side two

1. "Island in the Sun" (Riperton, Rudolph) – 4:45
  - Tom Scott – tenor sax solo
2. "Give Me Time" (Leonard Caston, Jr., Lila Hurtado) – 4:25
  - Stevie Wonder – harmonica solo
  - Gerry Vinci – violin solo
3. "You Take My Breath Away" (Riperton, Rudolph, Randy Waldman) – 4:35
  - George Benson – additional vocals
4. "The Song of Life (La-La-La)" (Riperton, Rudolph, Caston, Weider) – 4:10
  - Patrice Rushen – vocals, electric piano

== Personnel ==
- Minnie Riperton – vocals
- Michael Jackson, George Benson, Patrice Rushen, Peabo Bryson, Roberta Flack – additional vocals
- Tennyson Stephens – acoustic piano
- Patrice Rushen – electric piano
- Greg Phillinganes – keyboards, synthesizer
- Lee Ritenour, Paul Jackson Jr. – guitar
- Gayle Levant – harp
- Abraham Laboriel – bass guitar
- Harvey Mason – drums
- Lenny Castro, Paulinho da Costa – percussion
- Tom Scott – tenor saxophone
- Hubert Laws – flute
- Stevie Wonder – harmonica
- Gerry Vinci – concertmaster
- Maxine Waters, Julia Waters, Stephanie Spruill – backing vocals

== Charts ==
Chart (1980)	Peak position
U.S. Billboard Pop Albums	35
U.S. Billboard Black Albums	11

Singles

Year	Title	US R&B
1980	"Here We Go" (with Peabo Bryson)	14
1981	"Give Me Time"	72
