= Perfect Angel =

Studio album by Minnie Riperton
- Released: May 24, 1974
- Recorded: 1973–1974
- Studio: The Record Plant, Los Angeles
- Genre: Soul; R&B
- Length: 36:43
- Label: Epic
- Producer: Stevie Wonder; Richard Rudolph (as Scorbu Productions)

Minnie Riperton chronology
Come to My Garden (1970)	Perfect Angel (1974)	Adventures in Paradise (1975)

Singles from Perfect Angel
- 1. "Reasons / Every Time He Comes Around" Released: May 28, 1974; 2. "Seeing You This Way / The Edge of a Dream" Released: August 21, 1974; 3. "Lovin' You / The Edge of a Dream" Released: November 29, 1974

Perfect Angel is the second studio album by American singer Minnie Riperton, released on May 24, 1974, by Epic Records. The album contains the biggest hit of Riperton's career, "Lovin' You", which topped the U.S. Pop Singles chart for one week in early April 1975.

== Background ==
In 1973, a college intern for Epic Records found Riperton in semi-retirement. She had become a homemaker and a mother of two in Florida. After he heard a demo of the song "Lie In The World", the rep took the tape to Gracie Allen, VP of A&R for Epic. Riperton signed with Epic Records, and the family moved to Los Angeles.

Riperton's husband, Richard Rudolph, said that shortly after she was signed to Epic, Ellis asked them who they wanted to produce the album. Riperton requested Stevie Wonder, who was very busy at the time with his band Wonderlove. Rudolph said that Wonder was a huge fan of Riperton and agreed to produce Perfect Angel under one condition. According to Rudolph, Wonder was signed to Motown and concerned that they would not allow him to work on the project. Wonder then said that he would only produce it under a pseudonym and with Rudolph as co-producer. Therefore, Rudolph recounted, they created the name El Toro Negro for Wonder and a production company called Scorbu Productions.

== Production ==
With associate producers Malcolm Cecil and Robert Margouleff on hand engineering and programming the synthesizers, Riperton and company recorded Perfect Angel at the Record Plant in LA, Stevie Wonder's choice of studio on the West Coast. Perfect Angel was a musical romp through rock ("Reasons"), easy-going pop ("Seeing You This Way") with a message song that closed side one ("The Edge Of a Dream" – written in honor of Martin Luther King Jr.). Wonder wrote the title tune as well as "Take a Little Trip".

At the end of production, there were eight completed songs; Wonder wanted one additional song to bring the album closer to the industry standard of a 40-minute run time. He asked Riperton and songwriter husband Richard Rudolph to come up with a tune that they considered to be their "most embarrassing song". With hesitation, Riperton did mention a lullaby she sang to her daughter Maya to put her to sleep at night so that she and Rudolph could spend "grown-up time". With Rudolph's help, Riperton eventually created "Lovin' You" from that lullaby, and the song was quickly recorded with Wonder on electric piano and synthesizers. Rudolph supplied the chirping birds from a sound effects reel.

== Commercial reception ==
Epic released Perfect Angel in June 1974, one month before Wonder's Fulfillingness' First Finale hit the record stores. While the album represented Riperton's eclectic musical directions, it posed a marketing dilemma with the label: is she a rock, soul or pop singer? As for radio, "Reasons", the first single, was embraced by the rock stations, but R&B radio weren't too keen on the hard-rocking guitar work heard on the disc. "Every Time He Comes Around" and "Seeing You This Way" hit a similar brick wall.

Sales started slow, and Epic was ready to move on to the next project However, a few MOR (Middle Of the Road) radio stations were playing "Lovin' You" as an album cut. Riperton and Rudolph heard this and asked Epic to give the song a shot as a single release. The label agreed and "Lovin' You" was on 45 in November 1974.

The single made a slow three-month climb to #1 on the pop charts in April (#3 R&B), thanks to an intense promotional schedule (her TV appearances on American Bandstand and Soul Train aired the same Saturday afternoon) and several in-person concert appearances. The album went Gold on the strength of "Lovin' You" and remains the only Gold Album in Riperton's career. Minnie Riperton was finally revered as the "lady with the high voice and flowers in her hair". The album also featured the song "Every Time He Comes Around", with Deniece Williams singing the background vocals.

== Critical reception ==
Professional ratings
Review scores
Source	Rating
AllMusic	4.5/5 stars
Christgau's Record Guide	B
Džuboks	(Favorable)
Pitchfork	9.0/10

Marcus J. Moore of Pitchfork praised the album saying, "Perfect Angel caught lightning in a bottle, and presented Riperton at her creative apex. Riperton set a precedent for artists like Erykah Badu and Moses Sumney, whose respective strains of soul and folk draw a direct line to her free-spirited ethos."

Robert Christgau found that Riperton "improves herself here. Abandoning mannered abruptness and pseudopsychedelic melodrama, she achieves a sensuous spirituality that may be overdomesticated but at least seems real-life."

Ron Wynn of AllMusic declared, "Perfect Angel is the best Minnie Riperton album."

Daryl Easlea of the BBC proclaimed, "Perfect Angel is one of the most joyous soul-rock hybrids ever released...Showcasing her five-octave range, Perfect Angel is infused with the hanging loose at home vibe of the era...It's bucolic, laid back, freewheeling and a pleasure from start to finish."

== Reissue ==
In December 2017, Capitol Records released a deluxe edition of Perfect Angel as a two CD set with outtakes and previously unreleased alternate versions of the original songs.

== Track listing ==
All songs written by Minnie Riperton and Richard Rudolph except where indicated.

Side One

1. "Reasons" – 3:25
2. "It's So Nice (To See Old Friends)" – 4:47
3. "Take a Little Trip" (Stevie Wonder) – 4:11
4. "Seeing You This Way" – 2:51
5. "The Edge of a Dream" – 4:20

Side Two

1. "Perfect Angel" (Stevie Wonder) – 3:41
2. "Every Time He Comes Around" – 3:55
3. "Lovin' You" – 3:44
4. "Our Lives" – 5:42

== Personnel ==
Information adapted from the original album's Liner Notes

- Minnie Riperton – vocals (A1–A4, B3–B4, lead on A5–B2)
- Stevie Wonder (as El Toro Negro) – acoustic piano, electric piano (A2–B4), drums (A1), cymbals, bass drum (A4), harmonica (B4)
- Marlo Henderson – lead guitar (A1–A2, A5–B2, rhythm on A3)
- Michael Sembello – lead guitar (A3–A4, B4)
- Richard Rudolph – guitar (B3)
- Reggie McBride – bass (A1–B2, B4)
- Ollie E. Brown – drums (A2–A3, B1–B2, B4)
- Rocki Dzidzornu – congas (A5, B4)
- Deniece Williams – backing vocals (A5–B2)
- Yvonne Wright – backing vocals (A5)
- Shirley Brewer – backing vocals (A5)
- Lani Groves – backing vocals (A5–B1)

Production

- Baker Bigsby – assistant remix engineer
- Malcolm Cecil – engineer, associate producer
- Kent Duncan – mastering
- Barry Feinstein – cover author
- Ann Garner – artwork
- Robert Margouleff – engineer, associate producer
- Gary Olazabal – assistant engineer
- Richard Rudolph – producer
- Stevie Wonder (as Wonderlove) – arranger, producer

== Charts and certifications ==
=== Weekly charts ===
Chart (1975)	Peak position
Australia (Kent Music Report)	17
US Billboard Pop Albums	4
US Billboard R&B Albums	1

Singles

Year	Title	US Pop	US R&B	US Adult
1975	"Lovin' You"	1	3	4

=== Certifications ===
Region	Certification	Certified units/sales
United States (RIAA)	Gold	500,000^{^}
^{^} Shipments figures based on certification alone.

== Trivia ==
Four artists who performed on this album (Stevie Wonder, Deniece Williams, Michael Sembello, and Ollie Brown [of Ollie & Jerry]) would all find themselves sharing space on the pop singles charts within a year of each other, a decade after this album's release.

== See also ==
- List of number-one R&B albums of 1975 (U.S.)
