= Minnie Riperton =

American soul singer (1947–1979)

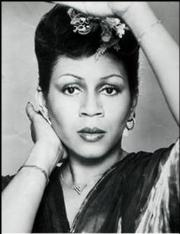
- Riperton in 1977
- Born: Minnie Julia Riperton; November 8, 1947; Chicago, Illinois, U.S.
- Died: July 12, 1979 (aged 31); Los Angeles, California, U.S.
- Resting place: Westwood Village Memorial Park, Los Angeles, California, U.S.
- Other name: Andrea Davis
- Occupations: Singer; songwriter
- Years active: 1962–1979
- Spouse: Richard Rudolph (m. 1970)
- Children: 2, including Maya Rudolph
- Musical career
- Genres: R&B; soul; jazz; psychedelic soul; vocal jazz; disco; funk
- Instrument: Vocals
- Works: Minnie Riperton discography
- Labels: Chess; GRT; Epic; Capitol
- Formerly of: Rotary Connection

Minnie Julia Riperton (November 8, 1947 – July 12, 1979) was an American soul singer and songwriter best known for her 1974 single "Lovin' You", her five-octave vocal range, and her use of the whistle register.

Born in 1947, Riperton grew up in Chicago's Bronzeville neighborhood on the South Side. As a child, she studied music, drama and dance at Chicago's Abraham Lincoln Center. In her teen years, she sang lead vocals for the Chicago-based girl group The Gems. Her early affiliation with the Chicago-based Chess Records afforded her the opportunity to sing backing vocals for established artists such as Etta James, Fontella Bass, Ramsey Lewis, Bo Diddley, Chuck Berry and Muddy Waters. While at Chess, Riperton also sang lead for the psychedelic soul band Rotary Connection from 1967 to 1971. She also performed backing vocals in Stevie Wonder's live band, Wonderlove, in the early 1970s to 1974.

On April 5, 1975, Riperton reached the pinnacle of her career with her No. 1 single "Lovin' You". The single was the last release from her 1974 gold album titled Perfect Angel. In January 1976, Riperton was diagnosed with breast cancer; in April, she underwent a radical mastectomy. By the time of diagnosis, the cancer had metastasized and she was given about six months to live. Despite the prognosis, she continued recording and touring.

She was one of the first celebrities to go public with a breast cancer diagnosis, but she did not disclose that she was terminally ill. In 1977, she became a spokesperson for the American Cancer Society. In 1978, she received the American Cancer Society's Courage Award, which was presented to her at the White House by President Jimmy Carter. Riperton died of breast cancer on July 12, 1979, at the age of 31.

== Early life ==
Riperton was born on November 8, 1947, in Chicago, to Thelma Inez (née Matthews) (1911–2005) and Daniel Webster Riperton (1898–1991), a Pullman porter. The youngest of eight children in a musical family, she embraced the arts early. Although she began with ballet and modern dance, her parents recognized her vocal and musical abilities and encouraged her to pursue music and voice training.

At Chicago's Abraham Lincoln Center, she received operatic vocal training from Marion Jeffery. She practiced breathing and phrasing, with particular emphasis on diction. Jeffery also trained Riperton to use her full range. While studying under Jeffery, she sang operettas and show tunes, in preparation for a career in opera.

Jeffery was so convinced of her pupil's abilities that she strongly pushed her to further study the classics at Chicago's Junior Lyric Opera. The young Riperton became interested in soul, rhythm and blues, and rock. After graduating from Hyde Park High School, now Hyde Park Academy High School, she enrolled at Loop College, now named Harold Washington College, and became a member of Zeta Phi Beta sorority. She dropped out of college to pursue her music career.

== Career ==
=== Early career ===
Riperton's first professional singing engagement was with The Gems, when she was 15. Raynard Miner, a blind pianist, heard her singing during her stint with Hyde Park's A Cappella Choir and became her musical patron. The Gems had relatively limited commercial success, but proved to be a good outlet for Riperton's talent. Eventually the group became a session group known as Studio Three and it was during this period that they provided the backing vocals on the classic 1965 Fontella Bass hit "Rescue Me".

In 1964, The Gems released a local hit, I Can't Help Myself, and their last single, He Makes Me Feel So Good, was released in 1965. The Gems later released records under numerous names—most notably 1966's Baby I Want You by the Girls Three and 1967's My Baby's Real by the Starlets. The latter has achieved cult status with northern soul fans and remains a favorite. It was a Motown-style song reminiscent of Tammi Terrell.

In 1968, Watered Down was released as a follow-up, under the name The Starlets. It was the last release of Riperton's former girl group. While a part of Studio Three, Riperton met her mentor, producer Billy Davis, who wrote her first local hit, "Lonely Girl", as well as its B-side, "You Gave Me Soul". In honor of Davis, she used the pseudonym Andrea Davis for the release of those two singles.

=== Rotary Connection ===
In 1966, some months after her Andrea Davis singles hit the radio, Riperton joined Rotary Connection, a funky rock-soul group creation of Marshall Chess, the son of Chess Records founder Leonard Chess. Rotary Connection consisted of Riperton, Chess, Judy Hauff, Sidney Barnes, and Charles Stepney. They released their debut album Rotary Connection in 1968 and, subsequently, five more albums: 1968's Aladdin and Christmas album Peace, Songs (1969), Dinner Music (1970), and Hey Love (1971).

In 1969, Riperton, along with Rotary Connection, played in the first Catholic Rock Mass at the Liturgical Conference National Convention, Milwaukee Arena, Milwaukee, WI, produced by James F. Colaianni.

=== Come to My Garden ===
In 1970, Riperton's debut solo album titled Come to My Garden was produced, arranged, and orchestrated by her Rotary Connection band mate Charles Stepney and released by GRT Records. Several of the songs were co-written by Stepney and Richard Rudolph, who married Riperton in August 1970. She was presented as a solo artist by Ramsey Lewis on Saturday, December 26, 1970, at Chicago's famed London House. Riperton performed several numbers from the album while accompanied by Stepney. Although the record was not commercially successful at the time of its release, Come to My Garden is now acclaimed by music critics.

=== Perfect Angel and "Lovin' You" ===
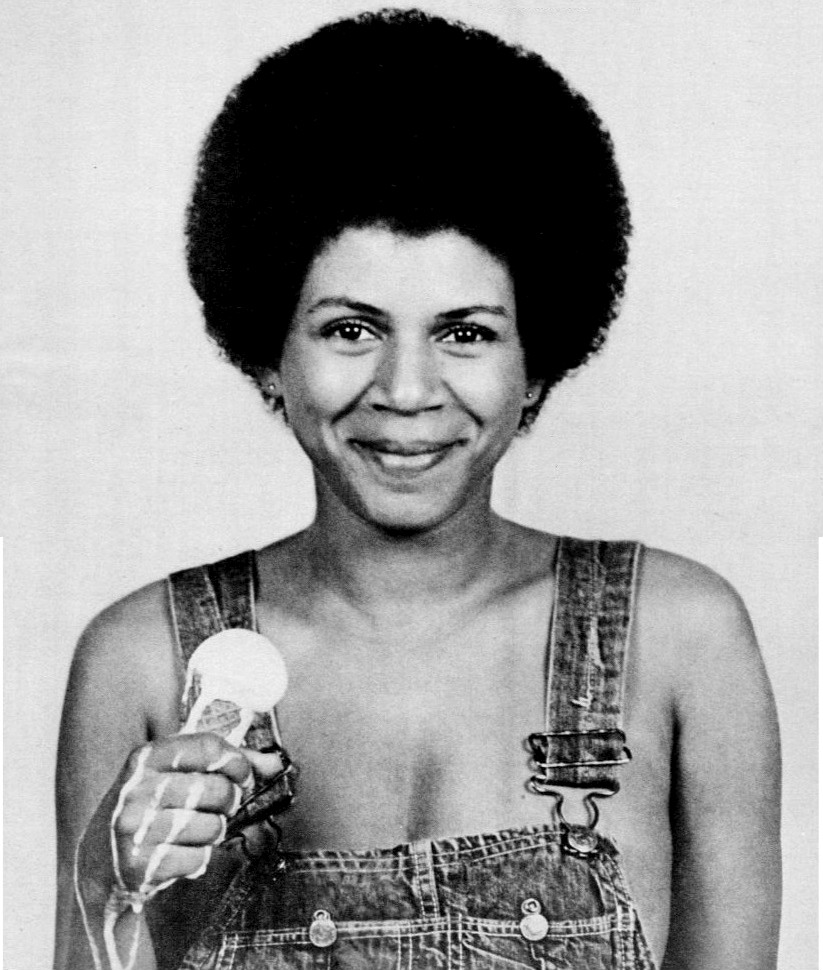
Riperton in 1974

In 1973, a college intern for Epic Records found Riperton in semi-retirement. She had become a homemaker and a mother of two in Gainesville, Florida. After he heard a demo of the song "Seeing You This Way", the rep took the tape to Don Ellis, VP of A&R for Epic. Riperton signed with Epic Records, and the family moved to Los Angeles, California.

The subsequent record, Perfect Angel, became one of Riperton's best-selling albums. Included were the rock-soul anthem "Reasons"; the second single, "Take a Little Trip" (written by Stevie Wonder, who also coproduced the album); and the third single, "Seeing You This Way". Sales of the album started out slow. Epic was ready to move on to the next record, but Rudolph convinced them to release another single. With the fourth single, "Lovin' You", the album caught on, and in April 1975, the song went to the top of the charts in the U.S. and 24 other countries.

The song reached no. 2 in the UK Singles Chart, and number three on the U.S. R&B charts. It sold more than one million copies, and was awarded a gold disc by the RIAA in April 1975. Perfect Angel went gold and Riperton was revered as the "lady with the high voice and flowers in her hair." The album also featured the song "Every Time He Comes Around", with Deniece Williams singing the background vocals.

=== Later career ===
After Perfect Angel, Riperton and her husband, songwriter and music producer Richard Rudolph started on Riperton's third album, Adventures in Paradise (1975). Joe Sample of The Crusaders cowrote the title song, "Adventures in Paradise", and Crusaders producer Stewart Levine co-produced the album. While shooting a promotional clip for the album, she was attacked by a lion, but was not seriously injured.

During an appearance on The Sammy Davis Jr. Show, she played the footage of the incident for Sammy and her fellow guests, including Richard Pryor. The album was a modest success. Despite the R&B hit "Inside My Love" (a no. 5 U.S. R&B hit, later covered by Trina Broussard, Chanté Moore, and Delilah), the album did not match the success of Perfect Angel. Some radio stations refused to play "Inside My Love" due to the lyrics: "Will you come inside me?"

Her fourth album for Epic Records, titled Stay in Love (1977), featured another collaboration with Stevie Wonder in the funky disco tune "Stick Together".

In 1978, Richard Rudolph and Riperton's attorney Mike Rosenfeld orchestrated a move to Capitol Records for Riperton and her CBS Records catalog. In April 1979, Riperton released her fifth and final album, Minnie. "Memory Lane" was a hit from the album.

=== Collaborations ===
Riperton provided backing vocals on Stevie Wonder's songs "Creepin'" and "It Ain't No Use" from 1974's Fulfillingness' First Finale and "Ordinary Pain" from 1976's Songs in the Key of Life. In 1977, she lent her vocal abilities to a track named "Yesterday and Karma" on Osamu Kitajima's album, Osamu.

== Personal life ==
Riperton was married to songwriter and music producer Richard Rudolph from August 1970 until her death in July 1979. She and Rudolph had two children: music engineer Marc Rudolph, born 1968, and actress and comedian Maya Rudolph, born 1972. Maya was a toddler when "Lovin' You" was recorded. According to the liner notes from Riperton's Petals compilation CD, the melody to "Lovin' You" was created as a distraction for Maya when she was a baby, so that Riperton and Richard Rudolph could spend time together. Near the end of the unedited "Lovin' You", Riperton sings "Maya, Maya, Maya".

== Illness and death ==
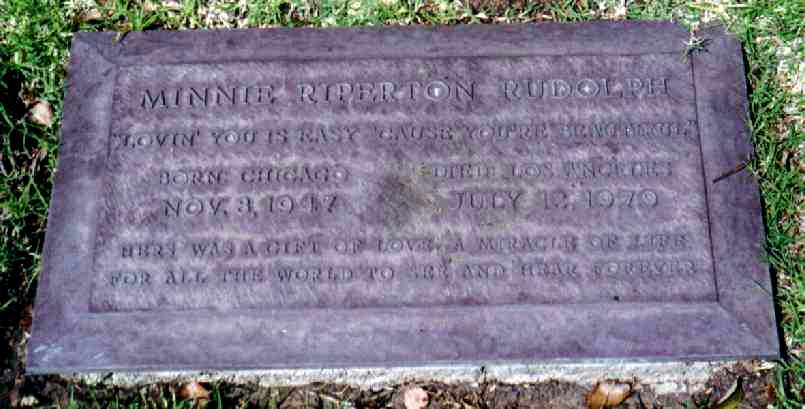
Riperton's grave at Westwood Village Memorial Park Cemetery

On August 24, 1976, Riperton revealed on The Tonight Show that she had undergone a mastectomy due to breast cancer. At the time of her diagnosis, Riperton found out her cancer had already spread to her lymphatic system, and she was given about six months to live. She continued touring in 1977 and 1978, and she became the national spokeswoman for the American Cancer Society's 1978–1979 campaign.

During the recording of her final non-posthumous album, Minnie, her cancer progressed to the point that she was in a great deal of pain. In early 1979, extreme lymphedema immobilized her right arm. In her final singing appearances on television, most notably on the Mike Douglas Show, her right arm remained in a fixed position during her performances. Near her death, in concert, she changed the end of "Lovin' You", "Maya, Maya, Maya" to "Maya, Maya, Ringo, Maya." Ringo was her nickname for her son, Marc. By mid-June, Riperton was bedridden. She entered Cedars-Sinai Medical Center in Los Angeles on July 10 and died there two days later in her husband Richard's arms while listening to a recording Stevie Wonder had made for her.

That Sunday, following a funeral service attended by more than five hundred mourners, Riperton was interred in the Westwood Village Memorial Park Cemetery in Los Angeles. Her epitaph is the opening line of her most famous song: "Lovin' you is easy 'cause you're beautiful". Stevie Wonder paid tribute to Riperton during a September 1979 episode of Soul Train. In June 2009, TV One's Unsung series aired a one-hour documentary on Riperton's life and career, featuring her husband and children, her sister Sandra, and many others who worked with her in the music industry.

== Posthumous releases ==
After Riperton died, several artists contributed vocals to tracks she had recorded before her death, to help compile Richard Rudolph's final tribute to his late wife, Love Lives Forever. Included, among others, were Peabo Bryson, Michael Jackson, and Stevie Wonder. In 1980, Riperton's last single, "Give Me Time", was released. Richard Rudolph wrote the song, "Now That I Have You" for her, but she never got the chance to record it. He gave the song to Teena Marie, who recorded it, and co-produced it with Rudolph, on Marie's second LP, Lady T.

In 1981, Capitol Records released The Best of Minnie Riperton, a greatest hits collection. The "new" song on the album was a remake of Joni Mitchell's "A Woman of Heart and Mind", which was a holdover from the Minnie sessions. Included was an alternate mix of "Memory Lane"; live versions of "Can You Feel What I'm Saying", "Lover And Friend", and "Young, Willing, and Able"; and two "Moments with Minnie". It included the hits "Perfect Angel", "Lovin' You", "Inside My Love", "Adventures In Paradise", and two tracks from Love Lives Forever: the single "Here We Go" (a duet with Peabo Bryson), and the song "You Take My Breath Away". In the 1990s, Riperton's music was sampled by rap and hip-hop artists including Tupac Shakur, Dr. Dre, A Tribe Called Quest, Blumentopf, the Orb and Tragedy Khadafi.

== Vocal ability ==
Riperton's official "press bio" reported that she had a coloratura soprano vocal range. Aside from her various hits, she is also remembered for her ability to sing in high head voice (occasionally the whistle register which is often mistakenly confused with the former), in which she had rare facility. In 2023, Rolling Stone ranked Riperton at number 65 on its list of the 200 Greatest Singers of All Time.

Mariah Carey cited Riperton as one of her musical influences.

== Discography ==
=== Studio albums ===
| Year | Title | Peak chart positions | | | | | Certifications | Record label |
| Year | Title | US | US R&B | AUS | CAN | UK | Certifications | Record label |
|---|---|---|---|---|---|---|---|---|
| 1970 | Come to My Garden | 160 | — | — | — | — | | GRT |
| 1974 | Perfect Angel | 4 | 1 | 17 | 8 | 33 | RIAA: Gold | Epic |
| 1975 | Adventures in Paradise | 18 | 5 | 54 | 55 | — | | Epic |
| 1977 | Stay in Love | 71 | 19 | — | 80 | — | | Epic |
| 1979 | Minnie | 29 | 5 | 60 | — | — | | Capitol |
| 1980 | Love Lives Forever | 35 | 11 | — | — | — | | Capitol |
"—" denotes a recording that did not chart or was not released in that territory.

=== Compilation albums ===
| Year | Title | Peak positions | | Record label |
| Year | Title | US | US R&B | Record label |
|---|---|---|---|---|
| 1981 | The Best of Minnie Riperton | 203 | 59 | Capitol |
| 1993 | Gold: The Best of Minnie Riperton | — | — | Capitol |
| 1997 | Her Chess Years | — | — | Chess |
| 2001 | Petals: The Minnie Riperton Collection | — | — | The Right Stuff |
| 2001 | Les Fleurs: The Minnie Riperton Anthology | — | — | EMI |
"—" denotes a recording that did not chart or was not released in that territory.

=== Singles ===
| Year | Title | Peak chart positions | | | | | | | | Certifications | Album |
| Year | Title | US | US R&B | US A/C | US Dance | AUS | CAN | CAN A/C | UK | Certifications | Album |
|---|---|---|---|---|---|---|---|---|---|---|---|
| 1970 | "Les Fleurs" | — | — | — | — | — | — | — | — | | Come to My Garden |
| 1974 | "Reasons" | — | — | — | — | — | — | — | — | | Perfect Angel |
| 1974 | "Seeing You This Way" | — | — | — | — | — | — | — | — | | Perfect Angel |
| 1975 | "Lovin' You" | 1 | 3 | 4 | — | 5 | 3 | 5 | 2 | RIAA: Gold; BPI: Silver | Perfect Angel |
| 1975 | "Inside My Love" | 76 | 26 | — | — | — | 97 | — | — | | Adventures in Paradise |
| 1975 | "Simple Things" | — | 70 | 45 | — | — | — | 44 | — | | Adventures in Paradise |
| 1976 | "Adventures in Paradise" | — | 72 | — | — | — | — | — | — | | Adventures in Paradise |
| 1977 | "Stick Together (Part One)" | — | 57 | — | 23 | — | — | — | — | | Stay in Love |
| 1977 | "Wouldn't Matter Where You Are" | — | — | — | — | — | — | — | — | | Stay in Love |
| 1977 | "Young Willing and Able" | — | — | — | — | — | — | — | — | | Stay in Love |
| 1979 | "Memory Lane" | — | 16 | — | — | — | — | 14 | — | | Minnie |
| 1979 | "Lover and Friend" | — | 20 | — | — | — | — | — | — | | Minnie |
| 1980 | "Here We Go" (with Peabo Bryson) | — | 14 | — | — | — | — | — | — | | Love Lives Forever |
| 1980 | "Give Me Time" | — | 75 | — | — | — | — | — | — | | Love Lives Forever |
"—" denotes a recording that did not chart or was not released in that territory.

== Accolades ==
=== Grammy Awards ===
Riperton received a sum of two Grammy nominations.

| Year | Category | Nominated work | Result |
|---|---|---|---|
| 1979 | Best Female R&B Vocal Performance | Minnie | Nominated |
| 1980 | Best Female R&B Vocal Performance | Love Lives Forever | Nominated |

== Tours ==
- George & Minnie Live! (1976–77)

Riperton joined with established jazz guitarist George Benson, to kick-off a co-headlining North American concert tour. The tour ran from 1976 through the fall of 1977.

Set list

USA

Minnie Riperton

1. "Take a Little Trip"
2. "Reasons"
3. "Seeing You This Way"
4. "Adventures in Paradise"
5. "Les Fleurs"
6. "Everytime He Comes Around"
7. "Stick Together"
8. "Can You Feel What I'm Saying?"
9. "Simple Things"
10. "Young, Willing and Able"
11. "Inside My Love"
12. "Wouldn't Matter Where You Are"
13. "Lovin' You"

George Benson

14. "Affirmation"
15. "Six to Four"
16. "El Mar"
17. "Everything Must Change
18. "Going to Love you More"
19. "Lady Blue"
20. "Breezin'"
21. "California PM"
22. "The World Is a Ghetto"
23. "Greatest Love of All"
24. "This Masquerade"
25. "On Broadway"

Notes

- On select dates during the tour, Riperton's performance of her hit song "Lovin' You" included a reprise version that featured George Benson.
- Riperton performed "Can You Feel What I'm Saying?" only at select dates during the tour.

Dates

| Date | City | Venue |
|---|---|---|
| March 15, 1977 | Los Angeles | Los Angeles Music Center |
| May 9, 1977 | New York City | Avery Fisher Hall |
| July 15, 1977 | East Troy, WI | Alpine Valley Music Theatre |
| July 29, 1977 | Edwardsville, IL | Mississippi River Festival |
| October 7, 1977 | Phoenix, AZ | Celebrity Theatre |
| October 29, 1977 | Burlington, VT | Patrick Gymnasium |

- Not all North American dates are listed.
