= Time (Chase & Status song) =

Single by Chase & Status featuring Delilah

from the album No More Idols
- Released: 29 April 2011
- Recorded: 2010
- Genre: Breakbeat; jungle
- Length: 4:20
- Label: Mercury; RAM
- Songwriters: William Kennard; Saul Milton; Paloma Ayana; Ben Drew
- Producers: Chase & Status

Chase & Status singles chronology
"Blind Faith" (2011)	"Time" (2011)	"Hitz" (2011)

Delilah singles chronology
"Time" (2011)	"Go" (2011)

Music video
- "Time" on YouTube

"Time" is the fourth overall, and third official, single taken from British drum-and-bass duo Chase & Status' second studio album, No More Idols. The single features vocals from British singer Delilah. The single was released in the United Kingdom as a digital download on 29 April 2011. During March 2011, Chase & Status ran an online competition for fans to remix the track, with the winner's remix appearing on the digital bundle extended play. It was revealed on 31 March 2011 that the Kev Willow Remix had been crowned the winner of the competition, with the Primus Palas Remix and Enei Remix serving as the runners up.

== Music video ==
The music video for the track depicts a family seen through the eyes of the eldest daughter. On the outside, the family are perfectly happy, but it is then revealed that the husband and wife have regular arguments that usually end in the husband beating the wife. The husband is finally arrested by the police, but when the family go to see him, the wife seems to completely forgive him. The video ends with the daughter leaving home, and hugging her mother goodbye, while the father lies in prison. After this, a picture appears advertising Refuge.

== Track listing ==
- 12" vinyl
1. "Time" – 3:38
2. "Time" (Wilkinson Remix) – 4:51
- Promotional CD single No. 1
1. "Time" – 3:38
2. "Time" (Instrumental) – 3:38
- Promotional CD single No. 2
1. "Time" (C&S Champagne Bubbler Mix) – 4:35
2. "Time" (Wilkinson Remix) – 4:51
3. "Time" (Kamuki House Remix) – 4:20
- Digital download EP
1. "Time" – 3:38
2. "Time" (C&S Champagne Bubbler Mix) – 4:35
3. "Time" (Wilkinson Remix) – 4:51
4. "Time" (Kamuki House Remix) – 4:20
5. "Time" (Kev Willow Remix) – 4:14

== Chart performance ==
"Time" first made its appearance on the UK Singles Chart on 27 March 2011, where it debuted at number 40 on the dance chart. After four consecutive weeks of climbing the chart, "Time" debuted on the official singles chart at number 90; before climbing to number 58 the following week. On 7 May, the single climbed twenty places to number 38; marking the duo's fourth consecutive top forty hit. Upon release, the single climbed seventeen places to a peak of number 21; also managing to reach a peak of number six on the dance chart.

== Charts ==
=== Weekly charts ===
Chart (2011)	Peak position
Belgium (Ultratop 50 Flanders)	14
Belgium (Ultratip Bubbling Under Wallonia)	24
Scotland Singles (Official Charts)	25
UK Dance (Official Charts)	6
UK Singles (Official Charts)	21

=== Year-end charts ===
Chart (2011)	Position
Belgium (Ultratop Flanders)	82
UK Singles (Official Charts Company)	146

== Certifications ==
Region	Certification	Certified units/sales
United Kingdom (BPI)	Platinum	600,000^{‡}
^{‡} Sales+streaming figures based on certification alone.

== Release history ==
Region	Date	Format
United Kingdom	29 April 2011	12"; CD; digital download
