= Syience =

- Born: Reginald Perry
- Genres: Hip hop; R&B; pop
- Occupations: Producer, musician, songwriter
- Instruments: Guitar, bass, drums, brass instruments, keyboards
- Years active: 2002–present

Reginald "Reggie" Perry, better known as Syience, is a Grammy Award-winning American songwriter, record producer and musician from Flint, Michigan. He has worked with a number of recognizable and respected artists, including Beyoncé, Cheryl Cole, Jay-Z, John Legend, Mary J. Blige, Ne-Yo and more. Syience won two Grammys for his work on Mary J. Blige's Growing Pains and Ne-Yo's Because of You.

== Production credits ==
=== 2006 ===
Jay-Z – Kingdom Come

- 10. "Hollywood" (featuring Beyoncé)

=== 2007 ===
Ne-Yo – Because of You

- 10. "Angel"

Mary J. Blige – Growing Pains

- 15. "Smoke"

Ghostface Killah – The Big Doe Rehab

- 16. "Slow Down" (featuring Chrisette Michelle) (UK Bonus Track)

Beyoncé – B'Day Deluxe Edition

- 5. "Welcome to Hollywood" (featuring Jay-Z)

=== 2008 ===
Danity Kane – Welcome to the Dollhouse

- 13. "Key to My Heart""

Ne-Yo – Year of the Gentleman

- 02. "So You Can Cry"

John Legend – Evolver

- 10. "Take Me Away"

Beyoncé – I Am... Sasha Fierce

- 01. "If I Were a Boy" (Additional drums, guitar by Syience)

=== 2009 ===
Fabolous – Loso's Way

- 15. "Stay" (featuring Marsha Ambrosius)

Cheryl Cole – 3 Words

- 02. "Parachute"
- 09. "Don't Talk About This Love"

Wale – Attention Deficit

- 11. "Contemplate" (featuring Rihanna)

J. Cole – The Warm Up

- "Can I Live"

Ciara – Fantasy Ride

- "Fit of Love"

=== 2010 ===
Sugababes – Sweet 7

- 08. "Give It To Me Now"

Stat Quo – Statlanta

- 02. "Welcome Back" (featuring Marsha Ambrosius)

J. Cole – Friday Night Lights

- "2Face"

J. Cole – American Dreamin' Mixtape (unused track)

- "I'm on It"

Ne-Yo – Libra Scale

- 07. "Genuine Only"

=== 2011 ===
Marsha Ambrosius – Late Nights & Early Mornings

- 11. "Chasing Clouds"

Lupe Fiasco – Lasers

- 12. "Never Forget You" (featuring John Legend) (produced with Jerry Duplessis & Arden Altino)

Donnis – Southern Lights

- 00. "Ring My Bell" (featuring Dev)

=== 2012 ===
Delilah – From the Roots Up

- 3. "I Can Feel You"
- 7. "21"
- 9. "Shades of Grey
- 10. "Love You So"
- 11. "Insecure"

Frank Ocean Channel Orange

1. "Fertilizer"

=== 2013 ===
Gabrielle – Now and Always
20 Years of Dreaming

- 4. "Knew Me"
- 14. "Holding On for You"

J. Cole – Born Sinner

Interlude

=== 2020 ===
Jordyn Baby Woods - A Thousand Arms

- 2. "Red is Coming" (additional drums)
