= Inside My Love =

1975 single by Minnie Riperton

Single by Minnie Riperton

from the album Adventures in Paradise
- B-side: "Don't Let Anyone Bring You Down"
- Released: 1975
- Recorded: 1975
- Genre: Soul
- Length: 4:45 (album version); 3:50 (single version)
- Label: Epic
- Songwriter(s): Minnie Riperton, Leon Ware and Richard Rudolph
- Producer(s): Minnie Riperton, Richard Rudolph, Stewart Levine

Minnie Riperton singles chronology
"Lovin' You" (1975)	"Inside My Love" (1975)	"Simple Things" (1975)

"Inside My Love" is a 1975 single by Minnie Riperton from her album Adventures in Paradise. It was co-written by Riperton, Leon Ware and Richard Rudolph.

== Critical reception ==
BBC Music wrote "Of Ware’s tracks, the standout is Inside My Love, where ambiguous yet explicit sexual imagery is tempered by the innocence of Riperton’s vocal."

In a positive review Andy Kellman wrote "Each of the Riperton/Rudolph/Ware songs ooze playful sensuality, desire, and lust -- especially "Inside My Love" (a Top 30 R&B single), a swooning slow jam filled with double entendres."

The song reached just number 97 in Canada.

== Delilah version ==
"Inside My Love"

Single by Delilah

from the album From the Roots Up
- Released: 13 July 2012
- Recorded: 2011
- Genre: Minimal; trip hop; ambient; neo-soul
- Length: 4:41
- Label: Warner Music
- Songwriter(s): Minnie Riperton, Leon Ware and Richard Rudolph
- Producer(s): Delilah; Mikey J; Natalie Llaina

Delilah singles chronology
"Breathe" (2012)	"Inside My Love" (2012)	"Shades of Grey" (2012)

British musician Delilah released a cover version of "Inside My Love" on July 13, 2012, as a digital download in the United Kingdom as the fourth single from her debut album, From the Roots Up. The song peaked at number 60 on the UK Singles Chart.

=== Music video ===
A music video to accompany the release of "Inside My Love" was first released onto YouTube on June 19, 2012 at a total length of four minutes and twenty-three seconds.

=== Track listing ===
UK Digital download
No.	Title	Length
1.	"Inside My Love"	4:41
2.	"Inside My Love" (Redlight Remix)	4:25
3.	"Inside My Love" (Live from Maida Vale)	4:40
4.	"Inside My Love" (Radio Edit)	3:24
5.	"Inside My Love" (Whateverman Remix)	4:20

=== Chart performance ===
Chart (2012)	Peak position
UK Singles (Official Charts Company)	60

=== Release history ===
Country	Release date	Format	Label
United Kingdom	July 13, 2012	Digital download	Warner Music
