= Come to My Garden =

Studio album by Minnie Riperton
- Released: September 23, 1970
- Recorded: November 24–26, 1969
- Studio: Ter Mar (Chicago, Illinois)
- Genre: Soul; R&B
- Length: 37:01
- Label: GRT
- Producer: Charles Stepney

Minnie Riperton chronology
Come to My Garden (1970)	Perfect Angel (1974)

Professional ratings
Review scores
Source	Rating
Allmusic	4.5/5 stars
Billboard	(favorable)
Cashbox	(favorable)

Come to My Garden is the debut studio album by American singer-songwriter Minnie Riperton which was produced, arranged and orchestrated by Charles Stepney and released in 1970 under GRT Records. It was re-released in 1974 on the Janus label, in the same time frame as Riperton's album Perfect Angel and her hit "Lovin' You."

The album was first released on CD in 1990, and has since been made available in digital form. None of the CD editions have material transferred directly from the original master tapes. All CD editions were mastered in UK, USA and other countries using LP records and different noise reduction methods. It is quite possible that original tapes that belonged to GRT were lost forever.

The album peaked at number 160 on the U.S. Billboard 200 chart in 1974. Some versions of the CD release do not include the last track, "Whenever, Wherever." Riperton said she wanted a sound like the great Dionne Warwick / Burt Bacharach collaborations for the album.

== Background ==
Minnie Riperton was presented as a solo artist by Ramsey Lewis on Saturday, December 26, 1970, at Chicago's famed London House. She performed several numbers from the album accompanied by Charles Stepney, the album's producer. Although commercially unsuccessful, Come to My Garden is considered a masterpiece by critics. "Les Fleur" (Note: For unknown reasons, the original record label listed the song as "Les Fleur," although the correct French spelling is "Les Fleurs." Many reissues and compilations use the latter spelling.) is probably the album's best known song, and "Expecting" remains a favorite among fans.

The heavy rock aspect of Riperton's band Rotary Connection is absent here, replaced by lush orchestrations. The songs, mostly by Stepney and Riperton's husband Richard Rudolph, are largely minor-key ballads.

== Singles ==
The album opener "Les Fleur" got to No. 34 on both the UK Vinyl Singles and UK Physical Singles charts in mid-October 2020.

== Track listing ==
Side 1

1. "Les Fleur" (Charles Stepney, Richard Rudolph) – 3:18
2. "Completeness" (Stepney, Rose Johnson) – 3:32
3. "Come to My Garden" (Rudolph) – 3:19
4. "Memory Band" (Stepney) – 4:05
5. "Rainy Day in Centerville" (Stepney, Rudolph) – 5:22

Side 2

1. "Close Your Eyes and Remember" (Stepney, Rudolph) – 3:38
2. "Oh, By the Way" (Stepney, Rudolph) – 2:58
3. "Expecting" (Stepney, Jon Stocklin) – 3:51
4. "Only When I'm Dreaming" (Stepney, Sidney Barnes) – 3:24
5. "Whenever, Wherever" (Stepney, Johnson) – 3:34

== Personnel ==
- Elsa Harris, Kitty Hayward, Minnie Riperton – Backing vocals
- Maurice White – Drums
- Phil Upchurch – Guitar
- Ramsey Lewis – Piano
- Cleveland Eaton – Bass
- Charles Stepney – Arranger and conductor
- Minnie Riperton – Vocals

== In popular culture ==
The album has been featured in various samples and covers.

- "Les Fleur" was sampled in "A Huge Ever Growing Pulsating Brain That Rules from the Centre of the Ultraworld" by the Orb on the album The Orb's Adventures Beyond the Ultraworld
- "Les Fleur" was sampled in "Similak Child" by Black Sheep on the album A Wolf in Sheep's Clothing
- "Rainy Day in Centerville" was sampled in "Where Y'all At" by Nas from the album Hip Hop Is Dead
- "Only When I'm Dreaming" was sampled in "Hellucination" by Smif-n-Wessun from the album Dah Shinin'
- "Les Fleur" was covered by British band 4hero on their 2001 album Creating Patterns.
- "Les Fleur" was featured in the 2014 film adaptation of Inherent Vice by Paul Thomas Anderson, who is the husband of Riperton's daughter, Maya Rudolph.
- "Les Fleur" was prominent during the ending of the 2019 horror film Us.
- "Les Fleur" was featured in episode 3 of Them (dir. Nelson Cragg et al., 2021).
- "Les Fleur" was featured in the fourth episode of the 2022 limited series Gaslit.
- "Les Fleur" was featured in the episode The Big Payback of Atlanta season 3 (2022).
- "Les Fleur" was featured in a women's sports campaign by BBC Sport in the summer of 2022 titled We Know Our Place.
- "Les Fleur" was featured in the Amy Winehouse biographical drama film titled Back to Black
