= Lovin' You =

1974 single by Minnie Riperton

- Dutch picture sleeve

Single by Minnie Riperton

from the album Perfect Angel
- B-side: "The Edge of a Dream"
- Released: November 29, 1974
- Recorded: 1974
- Studio: Record Plant, Los Angeles, CA
- Genre: Soul; smooth soul; pop
- Length: 3:20 (radio edit); 3:41 (album version)
- Label: Epic
- Songwriters: Minnie Riperton; Richard Rudolph
- Producers: Stevie Wonder; Scorbu Productions

Minnie Riperton singles chronology
"Seeing You This Way" (1974)	"Lovin' You" (1974)	"Inside My Love" (1975)

Official audio
- "Lovin' You" on YouTube

"Lovin' You" is a song recorded by American singer-songwriter Minnie Riperton from her second studio album, Perfect Angel (1974). It was written by Riperton and her husband, Richard Rudolph, produced by Rudolph and Stevie Wonder, and released as the album's third single on November 29, 1974 by Epic Records.

The song peaked at number one on the US Billboard Hot 100 on April 5, 1975. It reached number two on the UK Singles chart, and number three on the Billboard R&B chart. In the US, it ranked number 13 on the Billboard Year-End Hot 100 singles of 1975.

On April 8, 1975, "Lovin' You" was certified gold in the United States by the RIAA for sales in excess of 1,000,000 units. It was also certified silver in the UK by BPI on May 1, 1975, for sales of 250,000 units.

== Background ==
Richard Rudolph began composing "Lovin' You" in 1971, while he and Riperton were living in Chicago. The couple later moved to Florida, where work on the song continued after their daughter was born in 1972. Riperton developed the final melody, while Rudolph wrote the lyrics and the bridge.

Riperton was offered a contract with Epic Records a few years later, and the couple moved to Los Angeles to record the album Perfect Angel. When Epic asked Riperton whom she wanted to produce the album, she named Stevie Wonder. Wonder, by then one of the biggest names in American popular music, was a fan of Riperton's work, and agreed to the collaboration.

However, Wonder was signed to Motown Records; so to avoid contract conflicts he was credited under the pseudonym "El Toro Negro", Spanish for "Black Bull", as Wonder's astrological sign is Taurus. For the same reason, Wonder only agreed to be a producer for the project as co-producer along with Rudolph, resulting in the production company Scorbu Productions being created specifically for the project.

== Composition ==
"Lovin' You" was originally published in the key of A major in common time with a tempo of 72 beats per minute. Riperton's vocals span from C♯_{4} to F♯_{6} (277–1480 Hz).

According to the liner notes from Riperton's compilation album Petals, the melody for "Lovin' You" was created as a distraction for her baby daughter (Maya Rudolph) so that Minnie and her husband Richard could hang out. Maya was in the studio with Riperton on the day it was recorded and Riperton can be heard singing her daughter's name at the end, but only in the unedited or album version. The song fades out early in the radio edit because the disc jockeys felt that the repeated "Maya" was being overdone and that it would be misunderstood as a religious chant.

== Instrumentation ==
"Lovin' You (Minnie Riperton)"
A later part of the song where she sings in the whistle register.

The original single version released to radio contained only Riperton's vocals, accompanied by electric piano and acoustic guitar. As with the rest of the album, the piano backing is played by Wonder. Rudolph played acoustic guitar for the track. After the single became popular, an alternative single version was created which added effects from an Arp string synth, likely in an effort to increase the complexity and depth of the otherwise simple-sounding song. This alternate 7" single version was released on the 2017 re-issue of the album, as Perfect Angel: Deluxe Edition.

"Lovin' You" was one of the first songs to top the US Billboard Hot 100 without the help of a percussion instrument.

Vocal range

The song is especially known for Riperton's use of the high whistle register in the song's bridge, and for the chirping songbirds heard throughout. Riperton stated that during the recording of the song's demo, the bird chirping was recorded accidentally. She said that it was kept in the song since it "seemed to work", and was included on the song's final version.

== Release ==
Rudolph and Riperton wanted Epic to release "Lovin' You" as a single, after seeing the song's effect on people while on tour to promote the album. Rudolph recalled: "We found ourselves performing in Portland one night during a huge blizzard. We look around and see that people are putting their arms around each other and having a great time as we're playing 'Lovin' You.'" Epic initially refused, because they had planned to market Riperton as an R&B singer. However, Rudolph and Riperton prevailed, rejecting the R&B label and insisting that "[Riperton is] a singer, period".

The song was released on November 29, 1974, as the third single from Perfect Angel. It went on to become the album's most successful track, and Riperton's biggest hit. With "Lovin' You", Riperton became the first female artist on the Epic label with a debut song that reached number one on the Billboard Hot 100.

== Chart performance ==
In the US, "Lovin' You" made its debut on the Billboard Hot 100 on January 18, 1975; twelve weeks later, on April 5, 1975, it peaked at number one. The song remained on the Hot 100 for a total of eighteen weeks. Ten weeks after entering the Billboard Adult Contemporary chart, the song peaked at number four, on March 29, 1975, spending a total of fourteen weeks on the chart. Ten weeks after entering the Billboard Hot R&B/Hip-Hop Songs chart, the song peaked at number three, on March 29, 1975. It remained on the R&B chart for a total of seventeen weeks. In Canada, the song reached number 3 on the pop charts (12 weeks total), number 5 on the AC charts (9 weeks total), and was number 56 on the year-end chart.

== Critical reception ==
Ed Hogan of AllMusic noted that Riperton's work is known for its simplicity, and that "Lovin' You" was consistent with this feature, stating that the song's "simple declaration of love" is enhanced by the "sparse, airy backdrop of chimey electric piano" in combination with "gentle acoustic guitar". Daryl Easlea of the BBC felt that "Lovin' You" was "one of the tenderest [songs] ever to grace the U.S. top spot". Easlea referenced Riperton's chant-like repetition of young daughter Maya's name at the end of the song, and declared that the song was "still as affecting now as when it was first heard".

Classic Pop said that the song showcased Riperton's voice, being "virtually a capella" with no percussion and sparse instrumentation. The reviewer defined Riperton as a "brilliantly uncategorisable artist", and thought that the song was a perfect example of how difficult it would have been to define and thus market her as an artist.

Marcus J. Moore of Pitchfork described "Lovin' You" as "remarkably affectionate" and a "sweet, acoustic lullaby that Riperton delivers wistfully". He felt that the song was an excellent example of Riperton's impressive five-and-a-half-octave vocal range, and praised Riperton's voice as a "dynamic, heart-rendering [sic] instrument that imparts love, caring, and tender romanticism in equal measure".

Stevie Chick of The Guardian noted the song's "smartly spare production", with "dizzy electric piano" and "gentle acoustic guitar". He felt that Riperton's "effortless" vocals not only showed off her five-octave range, but also revealed "the sound of Riperton luxuriating in joy".

"Lovin' You" was ranked number forty-six on Billboard's Top 50 Love Songs of All Time.

== In popular culture ==
In the 1996 comedy film The Nutty Professor, Sherman Klump, under the guise of his alter ego Buddy Love, sings the first part of the song to his love interest Carla Purdy (while humorously twisting his rival Reggie Warrington's hand to achieve the high singing note at the end of the chorus).

In the 1997 comedy film Vegas Vacation, Ellen Griswold and Wayne Newton sing the song in duet.

In season 1 episode 4 of South Park, "Big Gay Al's Big Gay Boat Ride", a bomb is armed to blow up the opposing football team using a sonic triggering device as Richard Stamos hits the high F-sharp note in the song. They attach the bomb to Middle Park's mascot. At halftime, Richard Stamos fails to hit the note, upsetting Jimbo and Ned, who shout that he is not as talented as his brother. At the end of the episode, Richard finally hits the high note causing detonation.

In the early 2000s, Visa used a clip of the song in a TV commercial where the song was played during a Pittsburgh Steelers game. To the dismay of many of the players and fans, in the middle of the commercial it cuts to a scene at a music store where an employee of the stadium sound crew was trying to buy a copy of "Who Let the Dogs Out" by using a check.

In the 2004 film Johnson Family Vacation characters Dorothy Johnson and Destiny Johnson sing the tune in the bathtub

In 2006, the Disney film The Wild features the song for a few seconds.

In 2009, the music appeared in OSS 117: Lost in Rio, a French comedy, the song was played for a few moments.

In 2010, the DreamWorks Animation film Megamind, it is played a couple of times throughout the film.

In 2019, it was used in the film The Angry Birds Movie 2. Riperton's daughter Maya Rudolph voiced Matilda in the film.

In 1977 The Barron Knights use the song on one of their comic duel version, with someone firing at the birds in the trees.

In 2025, the song was used in the first episode of the 7th season of Black Mirror, "Common People".

In the 2007 movie Disturbia, the song is played by Shia LaBeouf’s character during a scene.

== Track listings ==
- 7" single (1974) Epic 3121
1. "Lovin' You" – 3:20
2. "The Edge Of A Dream" – 3:34
- 7" single (1987) BR 45216 [Netherlands]
1. "Lovin' You" – 3:20
2. "Skylark – Wildflower" – 3:14

== Charts and certifications ==
=== Weekly charts ===
Chart (1975)	Peak position
Australia (Kent Music Report)	5
Belgium (Ultratop 50 Flanders)	7
Canada Top Singles (RPM)	3
Canada Adult Contemporary (RPM)	5
Finland (Suomen virallinen lista)	25
Ireland (Irish Singles Chart)	3
Netherlands (Dutch Top 40)	9
Netherlands (Single Top 100)	6
New Zealand (Recorded Music NZ)	11
UK Singles (Official Charts)	2
US Billboard Hot 100	1
US Adult Contemporary (Billboard)	4
US Hot Soul Singles (Billboard)	3

=== Year-end charts ===
Chart (1975)	Rank
Australia (Kent Music Report)	38
Canada	56
Netherlands	82
UK	24
US Billboard Hot 100	13

=== Certifications ===
Region	Certification	Certified units/sales
United Kingdom (BPI)	Silver	250,000^{^}
United States (RIAA)	Gold	1,000,000^{^}
^{^} Shipments figures based on certification alone.

== Other releases ==
On December 1, 2017, Universal Music Enterprises remastered and re-issued Perfect Angel as Perfect Angel: Deluxe Edition, in commemoration of Riperton's 70th birthday. The album was released as a two-CD set, in both standard digital as well as high-resolution 96k/24-bit audio formats. The deluxe edition contained two alternate versions of "Lovin' You" in addition to the original. The first was a 7-inch single version that contained an Arp string synth overdub, as well as a countdown by Rudolph that was not present on the original version. The second alternate version included backing by Stevie Wonder's Wonderlove band, whereas the original "hit single" version had included only Riperton, Rudolph, and Wonder on vocals, guitar, and keyboards, respectively.

== The Orb version ==
In 1989, English electronic music group the Orb released the song, "A Huge Ever Growing Pulsating Brain That Rules from the Centre of the Ultraworld (Loving You)", as a single on their own label WAU! Mr. Modo Records. It was later released by Big Life on the band's debut album, The Orb's Adventures Beyond the Ultraworld (1991).

The single version was recorded live at Cortina D'Ampezzo on October 15, 1989, and released in November 1989; it managed to reach number 78 on the UK Singles Chart despite being almost 20 minutes in length. "A Huge Ever Growing Pulsating Brain ..." consisted of various sound effects that were built around, and formed an ambient backdrop for, musical samples of Minnie Ripertons's "Lovin' You". The song is considered to be a definitive example of ambient house.

The initial single release was subtitled "Loving You", and contained samples taken directly from Riperton's recording. However, the Orb had not licensed the samples they had used of Riperton's vocals, and were forced to remove them. The single was reissued using vocals from a similar-sounding singer, so that only the copies from the single's first-week release contained Riperton's vocal samples; as a result, these copies are considered valuable.

Sal Cinquemani of Slant called the song "epic" and "the definitive ambient house track". He noted the "elegant tapestry of babbling brooks, crashing waves, crickets, chants, roosters, church bells, and various other modes of white noise" that was created to form a musical backdrop for the sample of Riperton's "Lovin' You". Brian Boyd of The Irish Times described the song as a breakthrough and landmark moment, which "went on to influence many a band, but none who could ever come near their idiosyncratic capabilities".

Within a week of the single's release, the Orb was invited by John Peel to record a live version of the song at the BBC's Maida Vale Studios (Studio 3) on December 3, 1989. Peel, the legendary DJ of BBC Radio 1, broadcast the live version on December 19, 1989, giving both the band and the song exposure to a much wider audience. The version that was played live on BBC Radio 1 included samples of Riperton's voice, and was ranked at number 10 on John Peel's year-end Festive Fifty for 1990, listed as "Loving You (Session)".

== Shanice version ==
"Lovin' You"

Single by Shanice

from the album Inner Child
- Released: August 1992
- Length: 3:57
- Label: Motown
- Songwriters: Minnie Riperton; Richard Rudolph
- Producer: Narada Michael Walden

Shanice singles chronology
"Silent Prayer" (1992)	"Lovin' You" (1992)	"Saving Forever for You" (1992)

American singer-songwriter Shanice recorded a cover of "Lovin' You" for her second studio album, Inner Child (1991). The song was produced by Narada Michael Walden and released by Motown as the album's fourth and final single in August 1992. It reached number 59 on the US Billboard R&B chart, and peaked at number 54 on the UK Singles chart. A remake of Shanice's original cover was also included on her album Every Woman Dreams (2006).

Shanice's five-octave vocal range, as well as her "rare coloratura soprano" abilities, were showcased by her cover of "Lovin' You".

=== Critical reception ===
Tim Greggs of AllMusic was impressed with Shanice's voice, and compared her vocal abilities to that of Minnie Riperton. Greggs felt that her version of Riperton's song was "somewhat" comparable to the original. Larry Flick from Billboard magazine called it a "shimmering rendition", where "her youth gives the song a lovely, innocent quality that should prove refreshing and irresistible to top 40 and urban radio programmers alike." He added, "Track also provides Shanice with an opportunity to flex her formidable vocal range."

Clark and DeVaney from Cashbox named it a "quality" cut from the Inner Child album. A reviewer from People magazine described the cover as "cherubic", while Wilson & Alroy's felt it was lacking adequate emotion, though they noted that Shanice was able to handle the technical difficulties of the song. Michael Eric Dyson from Rolling Stone opined that the singer "preserves the immediacy and simplicity of the original while adding color and nuance with an altered note here, a vocal flourish there".

=== Track listing ===
- UK CD single (Motown 860 071-2)
1. "Lovin' You" (single version) – 4:01
2. "I Love Your Smile" (Driza Bone single remix) – 3:50
3. "I Love Your Smile" (Driza Bone club remix) – 4:21
4. "Lovin' You" (instrumental) – 3:50

=== Personnel ===
- Drums and programming by Narada Michael Walden
- Keyboards and programming by Louis Biancaniello
- Produced by Narada Michael Walden

=== Charts ===
Chart (1992)	Peak position
Australia (ARIA)	189
UK Singles (Official Charts)	54
UK Airplay (Music Week)	47
US Hot R&B/Hip-Hop Songs (Billboard)	59

=== Release history ===
Region	Date	Format(s)	Label(s)	Ref.
United States	August 1992	Cassette	Motown	
Japan	September 21, 1992	Mini-CD	Motown	
Australia	October 26, 1992	CD; cassette	Motown	
United Kingdom	November 2, 1992	7-inch vinyl; 12-inch vinyl; CD; cassette	Motown	

== Other notable versions ==
"Lovin' You" has been covered in a variety of genres including jazz, reggae, pop, rock, electronica, indie rock, R&B, soul, and hip hop.

- American jazz musician and composer Miles Davis recorded the song "Minnie" on May 5, 1975. "Minnie" was based on Minnie Riperton's song "Lovin' You". The song was recorded in seven takes, with take number seven being released on Davis' posthumous album The Complete On the Corner Sessions (2007). Dominique Leone of Pitchfork described the song as "brief" and "strangely loungy". John Kelman of All About Jazz described the song as "near-pop", and one of the only tracks on the album that had a distinct melody and musical form.
- English singer Janet Kay recorded a reggae cover of "Lovin' You" in 1977, produced by Alton Ellis, which topped the UK reggae charts. Kay's version was included on the reggae compilation album Burning Up (1995); Stephen Cook of Allmusic noted that her cover was "very agreeable".
- Jamaican reggae artists Alton Ellis and the Heptones recorded a cover of the song for the album Mr. Skabeana (1980). Jimmy Wentz of VH1 ranked their cover version at number three on his list of 12 More Awesome Reggae Covers Of Classic Songs. Wentz noted that unlike the original, the cover contained percussion, and that the artists also did not attempt to sing in the whistle register.
- Massivo (Featuring Tracy) released a cover of "Loving You" which charted in the UK in May 1990, reached No. 25 and remained on the UK chart for 11 weeks.
- The band Her's released a cover of "Lovin' You" in 2017.
