= Richard Rudolph =

American songwriter, musician, music publisher, and producer (born 1946)

- Also known as: R.J. Rudolph; Richard J. Rudolph; Dick Rudolph; Rick Rudolph
- Born: Richard James Rudolph; October 27, 1946 (age 79); Pittsburgh, Pennsylvania, U.S.
- Origin: Chicago, Illinois, U.S.
- Occupations: Composer; guitarist; musician; songwriter; producer
- Instrument: Guitar
- Years active: 1966–present
- Label: Atlantic
- Spouses: Minnie Riperton (m. 1970; died 1979) Kimiko Kasai (m. 1990)
- Children: 2, including Maya Rudolph

Richard James Rudolph (born October 27, 1946) is an American songwriter, musician, music publisher, and producer.

== Life and career ==
Richard Rudolph is the son of Muriel Eileen (Neufeld) and Sidney J. Rudolph. Rudolph is of Jewish descent. His grandfather, Julius Abraham Rudashevsky, changed his surname from "Rudashevsky" to "Rudolph," and was one of the founding members of Congregation Beth Shalom in the Squirrel Hill neighborhood of Pittsburgh. Rudolph graduated from Tulane University's School of Arts and Sciences in 1968.

He started in the music business as a songwriter at Chess Records in 1969. One of his first compositions to be recorded was the title song for Minnie Riperton’s debut solo album, Come to My Garden. This began a multi-song collaboration with Charles Stepney, the producer of Earth, Wind and Fire fame. Together they wrote many songs for Riperton and Rotary Connection.

Rudolph’s career as a record producer began when he and Stevie Wonder jointly produced Minnie Riperton’s second album, Perfect Angel. Included in this album was the song, "Lovin' You", written by Rudolph and Minnie Riperton, which went on to become a No. 1 song around the world and has turned out to be one of the most performed songs of all time.

He has written well over two hundred songs in the course of his songwriting career; his many production and writing credits include recordings by Minnie Riperton, Stevie Wonder, Teena Marie, The Manhattan Transfer, A Tribe Called Quest, Michael McDonald, Jermaine Jackson, New Edition, 2Pac, Shanice Wilson, Michael Sembello, The Rotary Connection, The Temptations, Julian Lennon, Patti Austin, Timothy B. Schmit, Chaka Khan, Lara Fabian, Nuyorican Soul, Kimiko Kasai, and Dawn Robinson.

Besides producing music for and music supervising several feature films such as Cocoon, Running Scared, Black Rain, Flatliners, Weekend at Bernie's, The Black Dahlia, Virtuosity, and Duets, Rudolph has also overseen films for cable, mini series, and movies made for television. He served as Executive Music Producer on the Whitney Houston film project, Whitney, for Lifetime Movies. Rudolph has also served as the exclusive music consultant to HBO Pictures and was President of the Atlantic Records distributed label Third Stone Records, a company he co-founded with partner (actor/producer) Michael Douglas. Rudolph’s musical endeavors as a songwriter, record producer, music supervisor and label executive have contributed to worldwide sales in excess of 30 million albums and countless song placements in film, television, and advertising.

== Personal life ==
In 1967, Rudolph met singer-songwriter Minnie Riperton and co-wrote many of her songs, including "Lovin' You", "Inside My Love", "Adventures in Paradise", "Les Fleurs", and "Memory Lane." Rudolph and Riperton were married from August 1970 until her death in 1979. They had two children, son Marc (b. 1968) and daughter Maya (b. 1972).

Rudolph married jazz singer Kimiko Kasai on October 20, 1990. They reside in Santa Monica and Tokyo.
