= List of Steve Hackett band members =

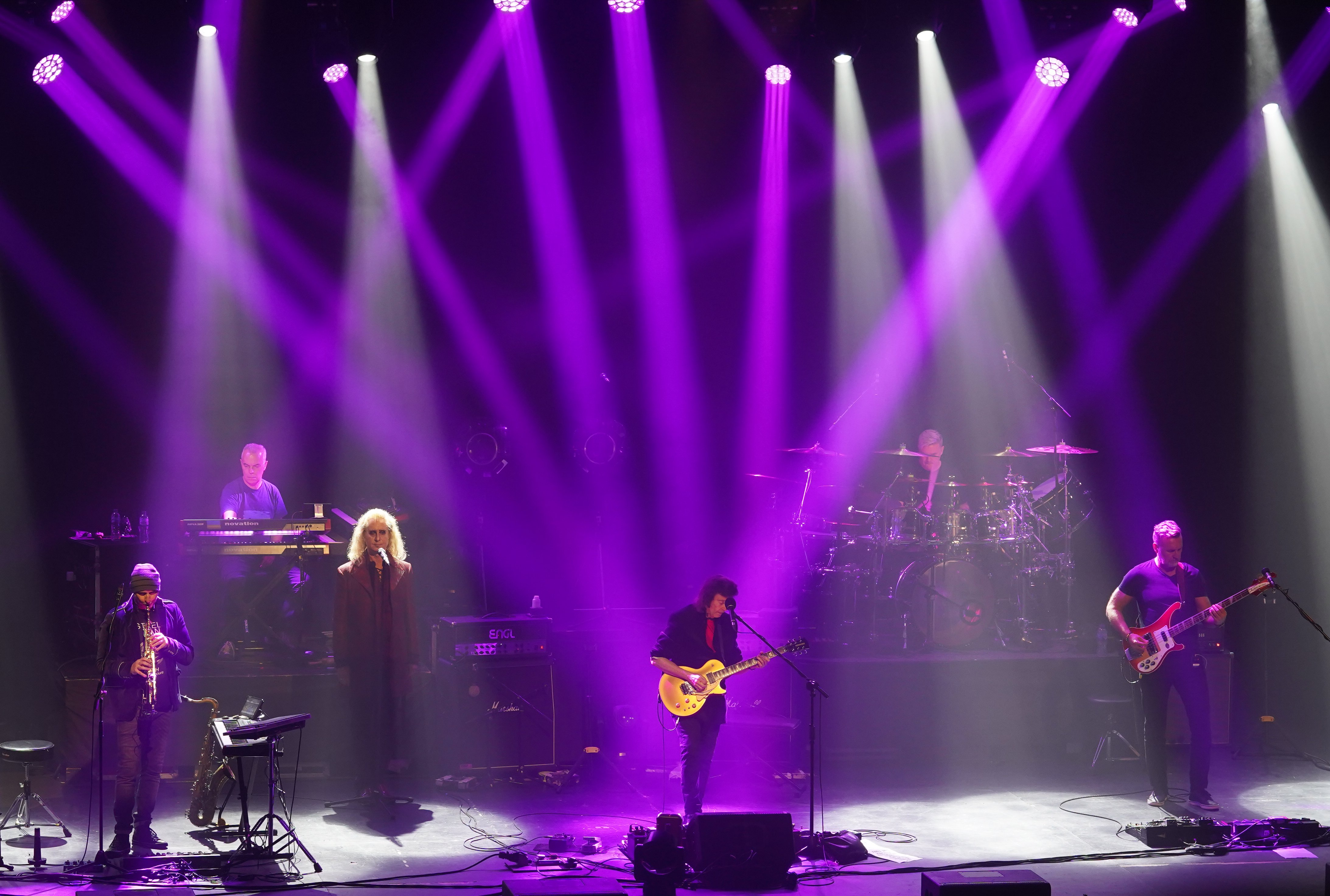
Steve Hackett band performing in 2022, (from left to right) Rob Townsend, Roger King, Nad Sylvan, Steve Hackett, Craig Blundell, Jonas Reingold

Steve Hackett is an English guitarist who is best known as the former lead guitarist of progressive rock band Genesis. He released his first solo album in 1975 and, after leaving Genesis in 1977, he continued his solo career. His first tour featured himself alongside his brother John on flute, bass pedals and guitar, Dik Cadbury on bass and vocals, Nick Magnus on keyboards, John Shearer on drums, and Pete Hicks on lead vocals. His current touring line-up includes himself on guitar, harmonica and vocals, multi-instrumentalist Rob Townsend (since 2001), vocalist Nad Sylvan (since 2013), bassist Jonas Reingold (since 2018), drummer Felix Lehrmann (since 2025) and keyboardist Lalle Larsson (since 2026).

== History ==
=== 1975–1990 ===
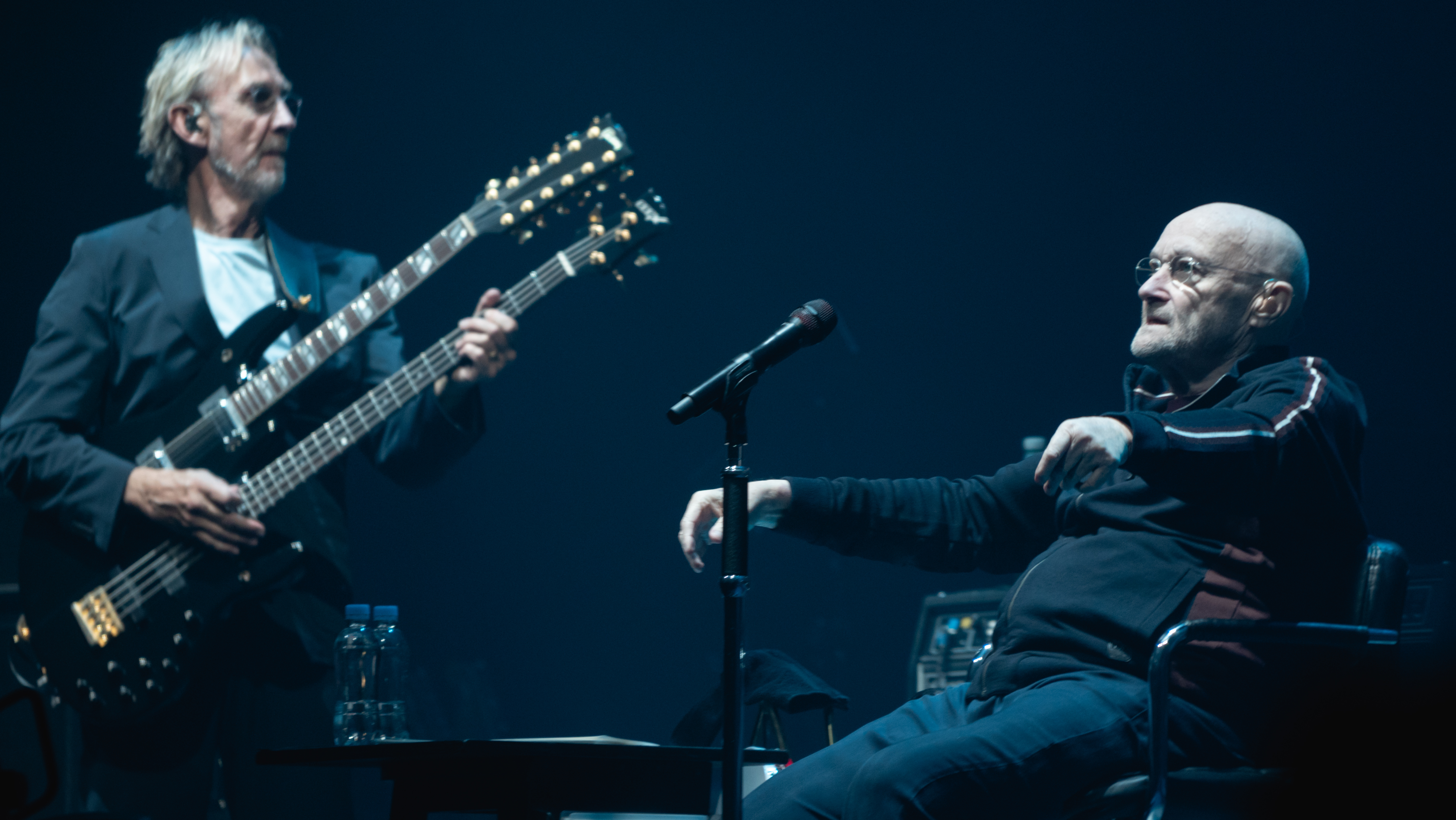
Hackett's Genesis bandmates Mike Rutherford and Phil Collins contributed to his first studio album.

Hackett released his first solo album in 1975, called Voyage of the Acolyte, while still a member of Genesis, the album included his Genesis bandmates Phil Collins and Mike Rutherford on drums and bass respectively, the album also included Hackett's brother John on synths and flute, John Acock on piano and synths, Ian Gillan sideman John Gustafson on bass, Brand X bassist Percy Jones and folk singer Sally Oldfield (sister of Mike Oldfield) among others. After leaving Genesis in 1977 he continued his solo career with Please Don't Touch! in 1978, this album included number of singers, including folk singer Richie Havens, R&B singer Randy Crawford, and Steve Walsh of American progressive rock group Kansas, the album also included Kansas drummer Phil Ehart, Genesis and Frank Zappa drummer Chester Thompson and former Mothers of Invention and Zappa bassist Tom Fowler.

The tour for that album included his brother John Hackett on flute, bass pedals, and guitar, Dik Cadbury on bass, vocals and violin, Nick Magnus on keyboards, John Shearer on drums, and Pete Hicks on lead vocals. The subsequent European tour was Hackett's first as a solo performer. It began at the Chateau Neuf in Oslo, Norway on 4 October 1978 and ended with six shows across the UK, culminating at the Hammersmith Apollo in London on 30 October. Hackett used his band on his next album, Spectral Mornings, recorded in the first two months of 1979 in the Netherlands.

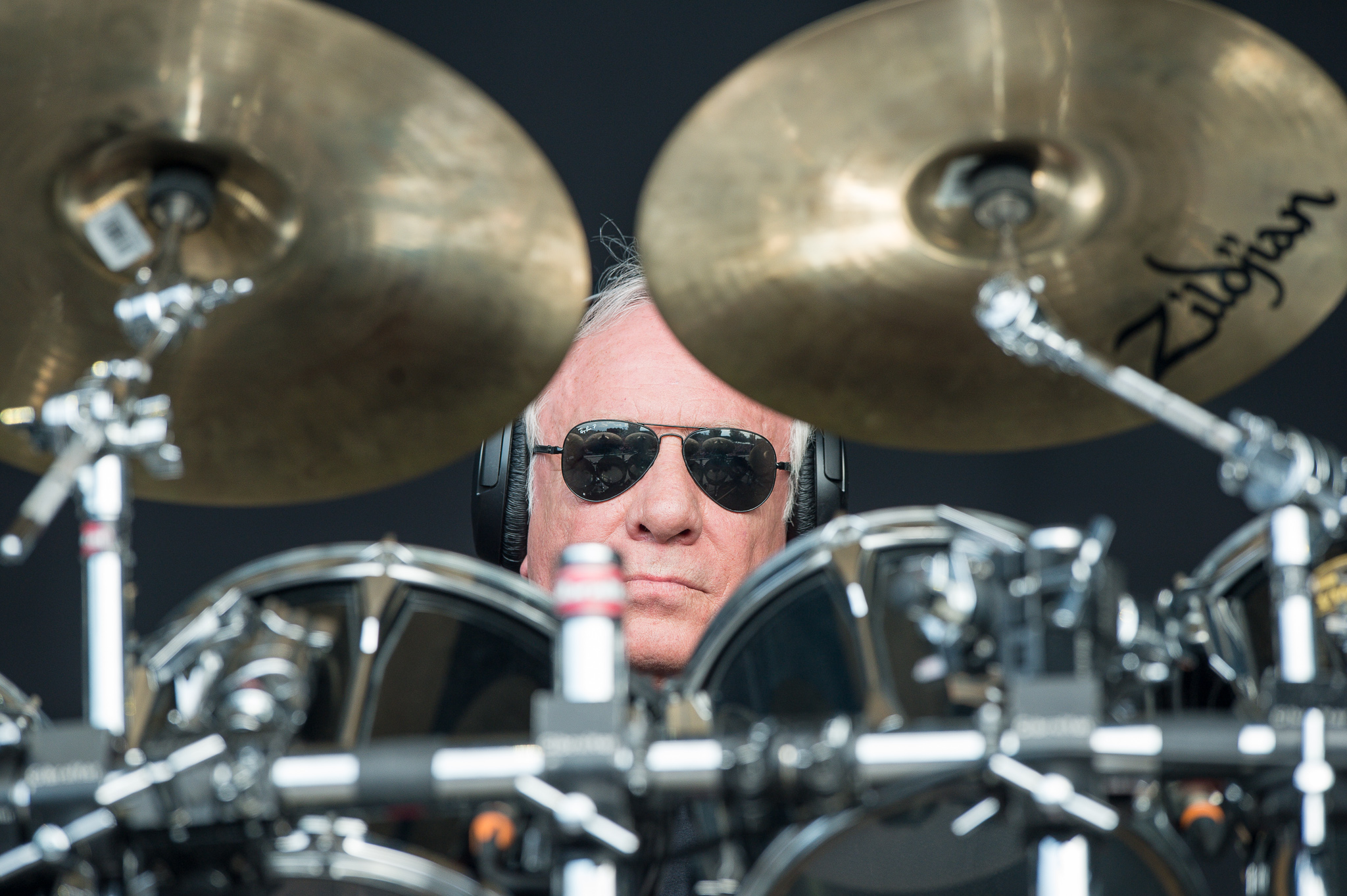
Future Marillion drummer, Ian Mosley, was a member of Hackett's band in the 80s

Before Hackett recorded his fourth album Defector, he organised a series of gigs in November 1979, including one in London at the Theatre Royal, Drury Lane, to test out new material. The album also included Hackett then touring band. Hackett changed musical directions with his fifth album, Cured (1981). It was recorded without his band which he had worked with since 1979, barring contributions from Magnus and John Hackett, and features Hackett handling all the lead vocals. Instead of using a drummer, Magnus used an electronic Linn drum machine. The album's tour marked a line-up change with John Hackett and Magnus joined by Chas Cronk (Strawbs) on bass and Ian Mosley (later of Marillion) on drums. The tour for Cured saw the band perform at the 1981 Reading Festival.

After promoting Cured, Hackett received an invitation to form a new trio with Keith Emerson and Jack Bruce, shortly followed by an offer to replace Paul Jones and become lead in a new West End musical production. He declined both offers, and went ahead with his next studio album, Highly Strung, put out in April 1983, which included Magnus and Mosley alongside other musicians.

In 1983, Hackett released his seventh album, Bay of Kings, containing classical guitar compositions, other musicians on the album included only Magnus and John Hackett. This was followed, in August 1984, with Hackett returning to rock music in his next release, Till We Have Faces. the album included Hackett, Magnus and Mosley and various other musicians.

In 1985, Hackett formed GTR with veteran Yes and Asia guitarist Steve Howe. The supergroup released a gold-selling album, produced by Yes/Asia keyboardist Geoff Downes. After GTR, Hackett returned to the studio and recorded a new solo album, Momentum, consisting of classical guitar compositions and Hackett brother John on flute. Released in March 1988, his tour across Europe to promote the album was met with large and enthusiastic crowds which included gigs in Estonia, Russia, and the Soviet Union. The tour included Hackett and is brother on guitar and flute respectively.

=== 1990–2000 ===
In 1992, Hackett resumed touring for the first time in six years, which also saw his return to activity in the US in several years. His reason for the prolonged absence was down to his involvement in various legal issues which prevented him from touring there.

Hackett was pleased that his 1992 North American tour was well attended, and used it to test the strength of some new material that he had been working on to an audience, as well as to promote his first live album, Time Lapse. The album included recordings from two shows, one from October 1990, recorded in Nottingham, and one from November 1981, recorded in New York. The 1990 recordings included bassist Ian Ellis, keyboardist Julian Colbeck and drummer Fudge Smith.

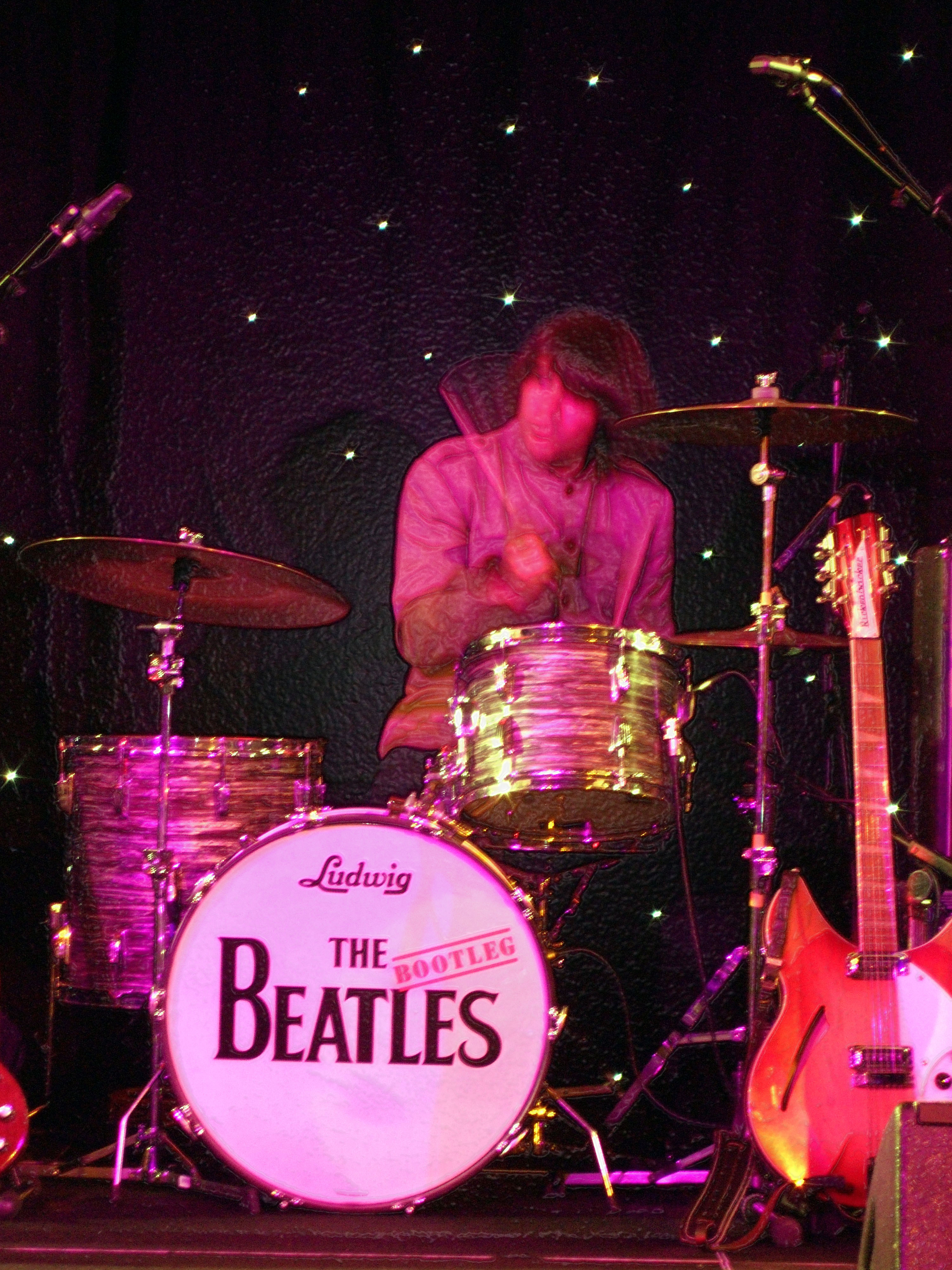
Hugo Degenhardt was a member during the mid 90s and later joined The Bootleg Beatles

In May 1993, Hackett released his tenth studio album, Guitar Noir. It includes the track "Walking Away from Rainbows", which lyrically dealt with Hackett's career decision of leaving mainstream music and pursuing what he wishes. The album included Colbeck on keyboards and backing vocals, Dave Ball on bass and Hugo Degenhardt on drums among others. The tour included bassists Dave Ball and Doug Sinclair, drummer Hugo Degenhardt and keyboardist Julian Colbeck.

Hackett followed this with a blues album, Blues with a Feeling (1994), formed of covers and original blues material penned by him and his group, which included Doug Sinclair (bass), Julian Colbeck (keyboards), and Hugo Degenhardt (drums).

For his next album, Hackett decided to rework a selection of Genesis tracks with various guest musicians, including John Wetton, Paul Carrack, Colin Blunstone, Ian McDonald, Tony Levin, Alphonso Johnson, Pino Palladino, Bill Bruford and Chester Thompson. This was released in 1996 as Genesis Revisited. Hackett promoted the album with two shows in Tokyo in December 1996 with and all star line-up of vocalist and bassist John Wetton (King Crimson, Asia), drummer Chester Thompson (Genesis, Santana), multi-instrumentalist Ian McDonald (King Crimson, Foreigner) and keyboardistJulian Colbeck (ABWH, Charlie). The concerts were recorded and filmed, later released as The Tokyo Tapes in 1998.

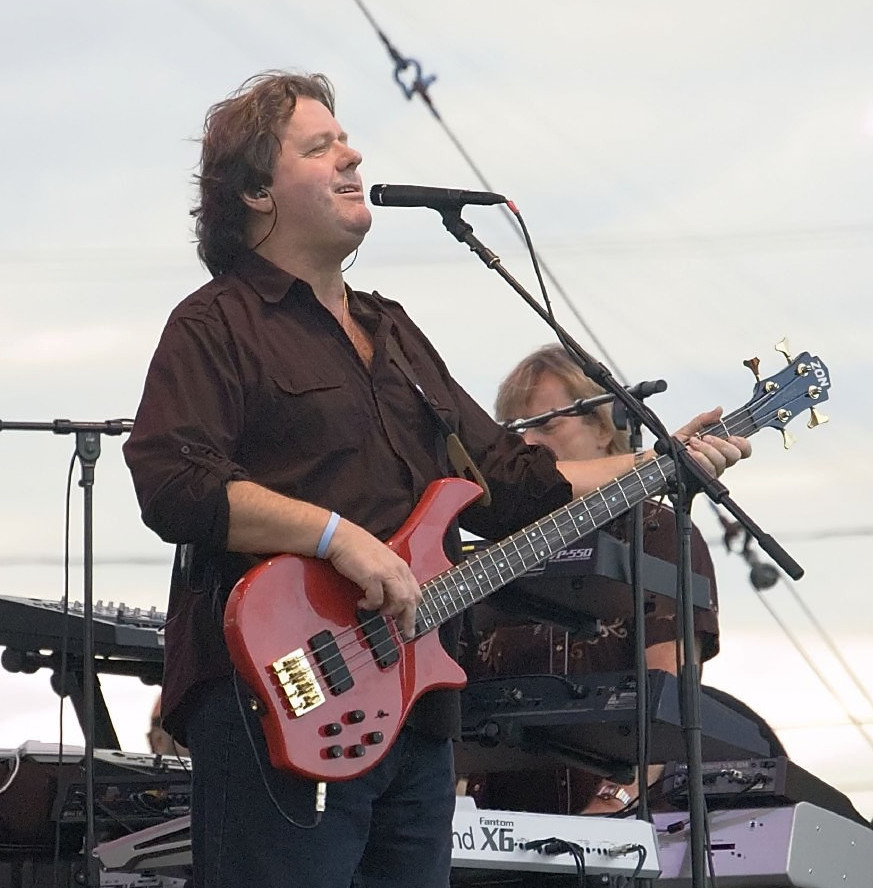
Former King Crimson and Asia frontman, John Wetton, performed as a guest with Hackett several times

In April 1997 he released the neo-classical influenced A Midsummer Night's Dream with accompaniments from the Royal Philharmonic Orchestra. It reached the top 10 UK classical chart. This marked the beginning of keyboardist, arranger, and producer Roger King taking a more prominent role on Hackett's future albums and live shows. In 1999, Hackett released his fourteenth studio album, Darktown. It included Julian Colbeck, Hugo Degenhardt, Jim Diamond, John Hackett, Roger King, Ian McDonald, Doug Sinclair and John Wetton.

In 2000, Hackett and his brother John released Sketches of Satie, a tribute album to the French composer Erik Satie with the compositions rearranged for flute and guitar. Hackett said that he had not worked on a project with John for some time and had missed playing with him, leading to his manager Billy Budis to suggest an album of Satie's music. Later in 2000, an album of Hackett's with material originally put together in 1986 but put on the shelf, was released as Feedback 86. A portion of the material was for a second GTR album, and features appearances by Brian May, as well as Marillion members Pete Trewavas and Ian Mosley, Bonnie Tyler and Chris Thompson. In addition, in July 2000, Hackett undertook a 4 day tour of Italy, playing for the first time live with Roger King on Keyboards, Gary O'Toole on Drums and vocals, Phil Mulford on Bass, and Ben Castle on Sax and Flute. This lineup is documented in the "Somewhere In Italy" bonus feature on the Somewhere In South America DVD.

=== 2001–present ===
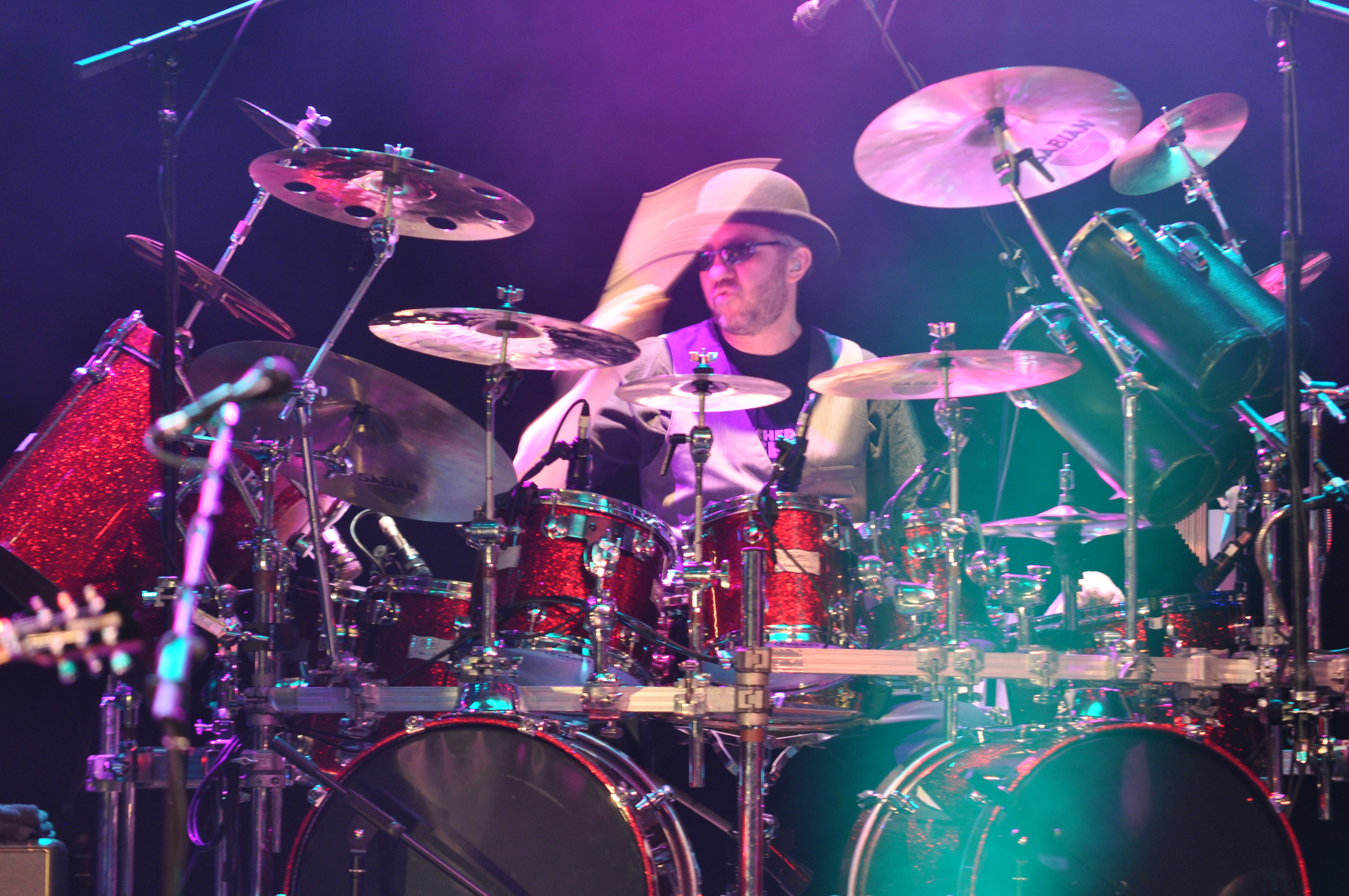
Gary O'Toole was Hackett's drummer and co-lead vocalist from 2001 to 2018

In 2003, Hackett released To Watch the Storms, his first studio album in four years and his first completed in his new recording studio, Crown Studios. It also marked his return to progressive rock music, and unlike his several previous records the material was put together within three months. The album features all of his then touring band, including Roger King (keyboards), Rob Townsend (woodwind, percussion, vocals, later keyboards), Terry Gregory (bass, vocals) and Gary O'Toole (drums, vocals), and also guests Ian McDonald (saxophone) and John Hackett (flute). This tour band stayed the same until 2005 when Hackett embarked on an acoustic tour which included Hackett, his brother John and Roger King, this tour continued into 2006 in Japan.

The electric band returned in 2009 with Townsend and O'Toole back and new members Nick Beggs on bass and Chapman Stick and Amanda Lehmann on guitar and vocals, as well as original bassist Dik Cadbury for at least one show. This band remained the same until 2011 when Beggs left and was replaced by Phil Mulford,

In 2011 Hackett released his 24th studio album Beyond the Shrouded Horizon which included his touring band, alongside guests John Hackett, Simon Philips and Chris Squire, among others. In 2012, Hackett and Chris Squire again collaborated to release the album A Life Within a Day under the name of Squackett.

During 2012 Hackett released Genesis Revisited II in October. The album features various guests, including members from Opeth, It Bites, Porcupine Tree, King Crimson, Sound of Contact, Marillion and Spock's Beard. Following this well-received album he has incorporated numerous Genesis songs into his live performances.

Lee Pomeroy joined in 2012 on bass, variax and 12-string guitar. The line-up changed in 2013 when Lehmann left the band, though she still makes regular guest appearances on tour, and vocalist Nad Sylvan, who had contributed to the Genesis Revisited II album, joined. In 2014 Pomeroy departed and was replaced by a returning Nick Beggs, however he was replaced by Swedish guitarist Roine Stolt in 2015 who stayed into 2016, he was replaced by Nick Beggs for his third tenure in 2017. Jonas Reingold (a regular collaborator with Stolt) joined the band in 2018 on bass and twelve string. Later in 2018 longtime drummer and vocalist Gary O'Toole departed from the band citing a "horrid year" in his personal life. O'Toole was replaced by Steven Wilson drummer Craig Blundell, this line-up has stayed the same since, except when Blundell had commitments with Frost* in 2022 and was covered for by Nick D'Virgilio (Spock's Beard, Big Big Train). Nick D'Virgilio again stepped in to cover on drums for the North American leg of the 2025 tour. Felix Lehrmann is scheduled to take over on drums in 2026.

In July 2025, long-time keyboardist Roger King announced that he would be stepping back after the Hackett's next US tour. Lalle Larsson will take over on keyboards on the 2026 tour.

== Other collaborations ==
In 1985 Hackett joined with then former Yes and Asia guitarist Steve Howe in supergroup GTR, the duo were joined by American drummer Jonathan Mover (ex-Marillion), bass guitarist Phil Spalding, and singer Max Bacon. Their self titled album was released in April 1986, for touring they were joined by keyboardist Matt Clifford. Hackett departed the group after the tour due to disagreements with Howe.

Since 2004, Hackett has also regularly collaborated with Hungarian jazz-rock band Djabe, which includes Barabás Tamás (bass), Égerházi Attila (guitar, percussions), Kaszás Péter (drums), Koós-Hutás Áron (trumpet) and Nagy János (keyboards). Members of Djabe have also contributed to Hackett's albums Out of the Tunnel's Mouth (2009), Genesis Revisited II (2012) and The Night Siren (2017)

In 2012, Hackett released a collaborative album with another Yes member, this time with bassist Chris Squire under the name Squackett. The duo released their only album A Life Within a Day, which also featured regular Hackett keyboardist Roger King, Noel Gallagher's High Flying Birds drummer Jeremy Stacey and Hackett's sister in law Amanda Lehmann on backing vocals, as well as a string section of Christine Townsend (violin, viola), Richard Stewart (cello) and Dick Driver (double bass) on the albums titular track.

== Members ==
=== Current ===
Image	Name	Years active	Instruments	Release contributions
	Steve Hackett	1978–present	guitar; harmonica; lead and backing vocals	all releases
	Rob Townsend	2001–2004; 2009–present	saxophone; flute; keyboards; percussion; bass pedals; backing vocals	all releases from Somewhere in South America... (2002) onwards, except Live Archive 83 (2006), except Tribute (2008)
	Nad Sylvan	2013–present	lead vocals; tambourine	all releases from Genesis Revisited II (2012) onwards, except Wolflight (2015), At the Edge of Light (2019), and Under a Mediterranean Sky (2021)
	Jonas Reingold	2018–present	bass; 12-string guitar; bass pedals; backing vocals	all releases from At the Edge of Light (2019) onwards, except Under a Mediterranean Sky (2021)
	Felix Lehrmann	2025; 2026–present	drums	none to date
	Lalle Larsson	2026–present	keyboards	none to date

=== Former ===
Image	Name	Years active	Instruments	Release contributions
	John Hackett	1978–1993; 2005–2006 (guest 2002–2004, 2017, 2025)	flute; bass pedals; guitar; keyboards; occasional vocals	all releases from Voyage of the Acolyte (1975) to Time Lapse (1992), except Highly Strung (1983); Genesis Revisited (1996); A Midsummer Night's Dream (1997); Darktown (1999); , from Sketches of Satie (2000) to Wild Orchids (2006); Beyond the Shrouded Horizon (2011); Genesis Revisited II (2012); Genesis Revisited II: Selection (2013); and from The Total Experience Live In Liverpool (2016) to Under a Mediterranean Sky (2021); The Circus and the Nightwhale (2024); Live Magic At Trading Boundaries (2025); The Lamb Stands Up Live At The Royal Albert Hall (2025)
	Nick Magnus	1978–1983	keyboards; drum machine	all releases from Spectral Mornings (1979) to Guitar Noir (1993); Genesis Revisited (1996); Feedback 86 (2000); Live Archive 70s 80s 90s (2001); Wild Orchids (2006); The Bremen Broadcast (2010); Genesis Revisited II (2012)
	Dik Cadbury	1978–1980; 2009	bass; bass pedals; violin; backing vocals	Spectral Mornings (1979); Defector (1980); Live Archive 70s 80s 90s (2001); Live Archive 70s : Newcastle (2001); The Bremen Broadcast (2010)
	Pete Hicks	1978–1980	vocals	Spectral Mornings (1979); Defector (1980); Live Archive 70s 80s 90s (2001); Live Archive 70s : Newcastle (2001); The Bremen Broadcast (2010)
	John Shearer	1978–1980	drums; percussion	Spectral Mornings (1979); Defector (1980); Live Archive 70s 80s 90s (2001); Live Archive 70s : Newcastle (2001); The Bremen Broadcast (2010)
	Ian Mosley	1981–1983	drums; percussion	Highly Strung (1983); Till We Have Faces (1984); Time Lapse (1992); Feedback 86 (2000); Live Archive 70s 80s 90s (2001)
	Chas Cronk	1981–1983	bass; backing vocals	Time Lapse (1992); Live Archive 70s 80s 90s (2001)
	Julian Colbeck	1990–1996	keyboards; backing vocals	Time Lapse (1992); Guitar Noir (1993); Blues with a Feeling (1994); Genesis Revisited (1996); The Tokyo Tapes (1998); Darktown (1999); Live Archive 70s 80s 90s (2001)
	Ian Ellis	1990–1992	bass; backing vocals	Time Lapse (1992)
	Fudge Smith	1990–1992	drums	Time Lapse (1992)
	Hugo Degenhardt	1993	drums; backing vocals	Guitar Noir (1993); Blues with a Feeling (1994); Genesis Revisited (1996); Darktown (1999); Live Archive 70s 80s 90s (2001); Wolflight (2015); The Circus and the Nightwhale (2024)
	Dave Ball	1993	bass	Guitar Noir (1993); Blues with a Feeling (1994)
	Doug Sinclair	1993	bass; backing vocals	Blues with a Feeling (1994); Darktown (1999)
	John Wetton	1996 (guest 2010, 2013 and 2014) (died 2017)	bass; guitar; lead vocals	Genesis Revisited (1996); The Tokyo Tapes (1998); Darktown (1999); Genesis Revisited II (2012); Genesis Revisited II: Selection (2013); Genesis Revisited: Live at Hammersmith (2013); Genesis Revisited: Live at the Royal Albert Hall (2014)
	Ian McDonald	1996 (died 2022)	flute; saxophone; guitar; keyboards; backing vocals; keybass	Genesis Revisited (1996); The Tokyo Tapes (1998); Darktown (1999); To Watch the Storms (2003)
	Chester Thompson	1996 (session 1978)	drums; percussion	Please Don't Touch! (1978); Genesis Revisited (1996); The Tokyo Tapes (1998)
	Roger King	1997–2026	keyboards	all releases from Genesis Revisited (1996) onwards, except Feedback 86 (2000), Live Archive 70s 80s 90s (2001), Live Archive 70s : Newcastle (2001) and Live Archive 83 (2006)
	Gary O' Toole	2000–2004; 2009–2018	drums; percussion; lead and backing vocals	all releases from Somewhere in South America... (2002) to Genesis Revisited Band & Orchestra: Live at the Royal Festival Hall (2019), except Live Archive 05 (2005), Live Archive 83 (2006) and Tribute (2008)
	Phil Mulford	2000–2001; 2011–2012	bass; backing vocals	Genesis Revisited II (2012); Genesis Revisited II: Selection (2013)
	Ben Castle	2000	saxophone; flute	none
	Terry Gregory	2001–2004	bass; backing vocals	Somewhere in South America... (2002); Live Archive NEARfest (2003); To Watch the Storms (2003); Live Archive 03 (2004); Live Archive 04 (2004); Once Above a Time (2004)
	Nick Beggs	2009–2011; 2014–2015; 2017–2018	bass; chapman stick; 12-string guitar; bass pedals; backing vocals	Out of the Tunnel's Mouth (2009); Live Rails (2011); Beyond the Shrouded Horizon (2011); Fire & Ice (2012); Genesis Revisited II (2012); Genesis Revisited II: Selection (2013); Wolflight (2015); Wuthering Nights: Live in Birmingham (2018)
	Amanda Lehmann	2009–2012 (regular guest appearances 2011–present)	guitar; lead and backing vocals	all releases from Out of the Tunnel's Mouth (2009) to onwards
	Lee Pomeroy	2012–2014	bass; 12-string guitar; guitar; bass pedals; backing vocals	Genesis Revisited II (2012); Genesis Revisited II: Selection (2013); Genesis Revisited: Live at Hammersmith (2013); Genesis Revisited: Live at the Royal Albert Hall (2014)
	Roine Stolt	2015–2016 (guest 2013)	bass; 12-string guitar; guitar; bass pedals; backing vocals	Genesis Revisited II (2012); Genesis Revisited: Live at the Royal Albert Hall (2014); The Total Experience Live In Liverpool (2016)
	Craig Blundell	2018–2025	drums; percussion; backing vocals	all releases from Selling England by the Pound & Spectral Mornings: Live at Hammersmith (2020) onwards, except Under a Mediterranean Sky (2021)
	Nick D'Virgilio	2022 (substitute); 2025; 2026	drums; percussion; backing vocals	The Night Siren (2017); At the Edge of Light (2019); Surrender of Silence (2021); The Circus and the Nightwhale (2024)

=== Guests ===
Image	Name	Years active	Instruments	Notes
	Peter Banks	1999 (died 2013)	bass	on "Blues Jam" at CRS Awards
	Oliver Wakeman	1999	keyboards	on "Blues Jam" at CRS Awards
	Ray Wilson	2013	lead vocals	on "I Know What I Like" and on "Carpet Crawlers" at Royal Albert Hall, he also sings on Genesis Revisited II: Selection (2013)
	Jakko Jakszyk	2013	lead vocals	on "Entangled" at Hammersmith Odeon
	Nik Kershaw	2013	lead vocals	on "The Lamia" at Hammersmith Odeon, which they perform on Genesis Revisited II (2012) and Genesis Revisited II: Selection (2013)
	Steve Rothery	2013	lead guitar	on "The Lamia" at Hammersmith Odeon, which they perform on Genesis Revisited II (2012) and Genesis Revisited II: Selection (2013)
	Chris Squire	2014 (died 2015)	bass	on "All Along the Watchtower" at Cruise To The Edge, he also played on Out of the Tunnel's Mouth (2009), Beyond the Shrouded Horizon (2011) and Wolflight (2015)

== Session ==
Image	Name	Years active	Instruments	Release contributions
	John Acock	1975; 1977–1978; 1982	acoustic piano; Elka Rhasphody synthesizer; Mellotron; harmonium; keyboards; synthesisers	Voyage of the Acolyte (1975); Please Don't Touch! (1978); Highly Strung (1983)
	Mike Rutherford	1975	fuzz 12-string guitar; bass guitar; bass pedals	Voyage of the Acolyte (1975)
	Johnny Gustafson	1975 (died 2014)	bass guitar	Voyage of the Acolyte (1975)
	Percy Jones	1975	bass guitar	Voyage of the Acolyte (1975)
	Phil Collins	1975	drums; percussion; vibraphone; vocals	Voyage of the Acolyte (1975)
	Robin Miller	1975	oboe; English horn	Voyage of the Acolyte (1975)
	Nigel Warren-Green	1975	cello	Voyage of the Acolyte (1975)
	Sally Oldfield	1975	vocals	Voyage of the Acolyte (1975)
	Steve Walsh	1977–1978	vocals	Please Don't Touch! (1978)
	Randy Crawford	1977–1978	vocals	Please Don't Touch! (1978)
	Feydor	1977–1978	vocals	Please Don't Touch! (1978)
	Dale Newman	1977–1978	vocals	Please Don't Touch! (1978)
	Dan Owen	1977–1978	vocals	Please Don't Touch! (1978)
	John Perry	1977–1978	vocals	Please Don't Touch! (1978)
	Maria Bonvino	1977–1978	female soprano	Please Don't Touch! (1978)
	Richie Havens	1977–1978 (died 2013)	vocals; percussion	Please Don't Touch! (1978)
	David LeBolt	1977–1978	keyboards	Please Don't Touch! (1978)
	Tom Fowler	1977–1978 (died 2024)	electric bass	Please Don't Touch! (1978)
	Hugh Malloy	1977–1978	cello	Please Don't Touch! (1978)
	Graham Smith	1977–1978	violin	Please Don't Touch! (1978)
	James Bradley	1977–1978	percussion	Please Don't Touch! (1978)
	Phil Ehart	1977–1978; 2021	drums; percussion	Please Don't Touch! (1978); Surrender of Silence (2021)
	Bimbo Acock	1981; 1991–1993	saxophone; clarinet	Cured (1981); Guitar Noir (1993)
	Chris Lawrence	1982	contrabass	Highly Strung (1983)
	Nigel Warren-Green	1982	cello	Highly Strung (1983)
	Rui Mota	1983–1984	drums	Till We Have Faces (1984)
	Sérgio Lima	1983–1984	drums	Till We Have Faces (1984)
	Waldemar Falcão	1983–1984	flute; percussion	Till We Have Faces (1984)
	Fernando Moura	1983–1984	Rhodes piano	Till We Have Faces (1984)
	Ronaldo Diamante	1983–1984	bass	Till We Have Faces (1984)
	Clive Stevens	1983–1984	wind synthesizer	Till We Have Faces (1984)
	Kim Poor	1983–1984	Japanese voice	Till We Have Faces (1984)
	Sidinho Moreira	1983–1984	percussion	Till We Have Faces (1984)
	Junior Homrich	1983–1984	percussion	Till We Have Faces (1984)
	Jaburu	1983–1984	percussion	Till We Have Faces (1984)
	Peninha	1983–1984	percussion	Till We Have Faces (1984)
	Zizinho	1983–1984	percussion	Till We Have Faces (1984)
	Baca	1983–1984	percussion	Till We Have Faces (1984)
	Brian May	1986	guitar; vocals	Feedback 86 (2000)
	Pete Trewavas	1986	bass	Feedback 86 (2000)
	Terry Pack	1986	bass	Feedback 86 (2000)
	Bonnie Tyler	1986 (died 2026)	vocals	Feedback 86 (2000)
	Chris Thompson	1986	vocals	Feedback 86 (2000)
	Aron Friedman	1991–1993; 1995–1996	keyboards; programming; string arrangements; piano	Guitar Noir (1993); Genesis Revisited (1996)
	Billy Budis	1991–1993; 1999	backing vocals; cello	Guitar Noir (1993); Darktown (1999)
	Jerry Peal	1994; 1995–1996	organ; keyboards; programming	Blues with a Feeling (1994); Genesis Revisited (1996)
	John Chapman	1994	baritone saxophone	Blues with a Feeling (1994)
	Pete Long	1994	tenor saxophone	Blues with a Feeling (1994)
	John Lee	1994	trumpet	Blues with a Feeling (1994)
	Matt Dunkley	1994	trumpet	Blues with a Feeling (1994)
	Paul Carrack	1995–1996	vocals	Genesis Revisited (1996)
	Colin Blunstone	1995–1996	vocals	Genesis Revisited (1996)
	Will Bates	1995–1996	saxophone	Genesis Revisited (1996)
	"Spats" King	1995–1996	vibes	Genesis Revisited (1996)
	Ben Fenner	1995–1996	additional programming; keyboards; orchestration; programming	Genesis Revisited (1996)
	Tony Levin	1995–1996	bass	Genesis Revisited (1996)
	Alphonso Johnson	1995–1996	bass	Genesis Revisited (1996)
	Pino Palladino	1995–1996	bass	Genesis Revisited (1996)
	Bill Bruford	1995–1996	drums; percussion	Genesis Revisited (1996)
	Tarquin Bombast	1995–1996	drums	Genesis Revisited (1996)
	Richard Macphail	1995–1996 (died 2024)	backing vocals	Genesis Revisited (1996)
	Richard Wayler	1995–1996	backing vocals	Genesis Revisited (1996)
	Jeanne Downs	1995–1996; 2003	backing vocals	Genesis Revisited (1996); To Watch the Storms (2003)
	Sarah Wilson	2003; 2004	cello	To Watch the Storms (2003); Metamorpheus (2005)
	Howard Gott	2003	violin	To Watch the Storms (2003)
	Lucy Wilkins	2004	violin	Metamorpheus (2005)
	Dick Driver	2004; 2006; 2011–2012; 2014–2017; 2018	double bass	Metamorpheus (2005); Wild Orchids (2006); Genesis Revisited II (2012); The Night Siren (2017); At the Edge of Light (2019)
	Richard Stewart	2004; 2006	cello	Metamorpheus (2005); Wild Orchids (2006)
	Richard Kennedy	2004; 2006; 2010–2011	French horn	Metamorpheus (2005); Wild Orchids (2006); Beyond the Shrouded Horizon (2011)
	Colin Clague	2004; 2006; 2010–2011	trumpet	Metamorpheus (2005); Wild Orchids (2006); Beyond the Shrouded Horizon (2011)
	Christine Townsend	2006; 2008–2009; 2010–2012; 2014–2017; 2018; 2021	violin; viola	Wild Orchids (2006); Out of the Tunnel's Mouth (2009); Beyond the Shrouded Horizon (2011); Genesis Revisited II (2012); Genesis Revisited II: Selection (2012); The Night Siren (2017); At the Edge of Light (2019); Under a Mediterranean Sky (2021); Surrender of Silence (2021)
	Lauren King	2008–2009	backing vocals	Out of the Tunnel's Mouth (2009)
	Egerhazi Attila	2008–2009	Anklung	Out of the Tunnel's Mouth (2009)
	Jo Hackett née Lehmann	2008–2009; 2011–2014	backing vocals; Anklung	Out of the Tunnel's Mouth (2009); Genesis Revisited II (2012); Wolflight (2015)
	Kovacs Ferenc	2008–2009; 2011–2012; 2014–2017	Anklung; trumpet; violin; vocals	Out of the Tunnel's Mouth (2009); Genesis Revisited II (2012); The Night Siren (2017)
	Barabas Tamas	2008–2009; 2011–2012	Anklung; bass guitar	Out of the Tunnel's Mouth (2009); Genesis Revisited II (2012)
	Banai Szilard	2008–2009; 2011–2012	Anklung; drums	Out of the Tunnel's Mouth (2009); Genesis Revisited II (2012)
	Kovacs Zoltan	2008–2009; 2011–2012	Anklung; piano; keyboards	Out of the Tunnel's Mouth (2009); Genesis Revisited II (2012)
	Simon Phillips	2010–2011; 2018	drums	Beyond the Shrouded Horizon (2011); At the Edge of Light (2019)
	Mikael Åkerfeldt	2011–2012	vocals	Genesis Revisited II (2012)
	Conrad Keely	2011–2012	vocals	Genesis Revisited II (2012)
	Attila Égerházi	2011–2012	guitar; percussion	Genesis Revisited II (2012)
	Simon Collins	2011–2012	keyboards; vocals	Genesis Revisited II (2012)
	Neal Morse	2011–2012	keyboards; vocals	Genesis Revisited II (2012)
	Dave Kerzner	2011–2012	keyboards	Genesis Revisited II (2012)
	Francis Dunnery	2011–2012	guitar; vocals	Genesis Revisited II (2012); Genesis Revisited II: Selection (2012)
	Steven Wilson	2011–2012	guitar; vocals	Genesis Revisited II (2012); Genesis Revisited II: Selection (2012)
	Jeremy Stacey	2011–2012	drums	Genesis Revisited II (2012); Genesis Revisited II: Selection (2012)
	Rachel Ford	2011–2012	cello	Genesis Revisited II (2012); Genesis Revisited II: Selection (2012)
	Malik Mansurov	2012–2017; 2018; 2021; 2023	tar	Wolflight (2015); The Night Siren (2017); At the Edge of Light (2019); Under a Mediterranean Sky (2021); Surrender of Silence (2021); The Circus and the Nightwhale (2024)
	Sara Kovács	2012–2017	didgeridoo	Wolflight (2015); The Night Siren (2017)
	Gunnlaugur Briem	2014–2017; 2018	drums; cajon; percussion	The Night Siren (2017); At the Edge of Light (2019)
	Benedict Fenner	2014–2017; 2018	keyboards; programming	The Night Siren (2017); At the Edge of Light (2019)
	Leslie-Miriam Bennett	2014–2017	keyboards	The Night Siren (2017)
	Troy Donockley	2014–2017	uilleann pipes	The Night Siren (2017)
	Kobi Farhi	2014–2017	vocals	The Night Siren (2017)
	Mīrā ‘Awaḍ	2014–2017	vocals	The Night Siren (2017)
	Durga McBroom	2018; 2021	vocals	At the Edge of Light (2019); Surrender of Silence (2021)
	Lorelei McBroom	2018; 2021	vocals	At the Edge of Light (2019); Surrender of Silence (2021)
	Sheema Mukherjee	2018	sitar	At the Edge of Light (2019)
	Paul Stillwell	2018	didgeridoo	At the Edge of Light (2019)
	Franck Avril	2021	oboe	Under a Mediterranean Sky (2021)
	Arsen Petrosyan	2021	duduk	Under a Mediterranean Sky (2021)
	Sodirkhon Ubaidulloev	2021	dutar	Surrender of Silence (2021)
	Benedict Fenner	2023	keyboards	The Circus and the Nightwhale (2024)

== Line-ups ==
Period	Members	Releases
1978–1983	Steve Hackett – guitar, vocals; John Hackett – flute, keyboards, guitar; Pete Hicks – vocals; Nick Magnus – keyboards; Dik Cadbury – bass, vocals; John Shearer – drums, percussion	Spectral Mornings (1979); Defector (1980); Live Archive 70s 80s 90s (2001) two disc; Live Archive 70s : Newcastle (2001); The Bremen Broadcast (2010)
1980–1981	Steve Hackett – vocals, guitar, bass; John Hackett – flute, keyboards, guitar; Nick Magnus – keyboards, drum machine	Cured (1981)
1981–1983	Steve Hackett – vocals, guitar, bass; John Hackett – flute, keyboards, guitar; Nick Magnus – keyboards; Chas Cronk – bass, vocals; Ian Mosley – drums	Highly Strung (1983) (without Cronk); Time Lapse (1992) six tracks; Live Archive 70s 80s 90s (2001) one disc
1983–1988	Steve Hackett – guitar; John Hackett – flute	Bay of Kings (1983); Till We Have Faces (1984) (without John); Momentum (1988); Feedback 86 (2000) various personnel; Live Archive 83 (2006)
Hiatus 1989 – 1990
1990–1992	Steve Hackett – guitar, vocals; John Hackett – flute, guitar, bass pedals; Julian Colbeck – keyboards, backing vocals; Ian Ellis – bass, vocals; Fudge Smith – drums	Time Lapse (1992) seven tracks
1993	Steve Hackett – guitar, vocals; Julian Colbeck – keyboards, backing vocals; Dave Ball – bass; Hugo Degenhardt – drums	Guitar Noir (1993); Blues with a Feeling (1994) two tracks
1993	Steve Hackett – guitar, vocals; Julian Colbeck – keyboards, backing vocals; Hugo Degenhardt – drums; Doug Sinclair – bass, vocals	Blues with a Feeling (1994) remaining tracks; Live Archive 70s 80s 90s (2001) one disc
1994	Steve Hackett – guitar; Julian Colbeck – keyboards	There Are Many Sides to the Night (1995)
1996	Steve Hackett – guitar; Julian Colbeck – keyboards; John Wetton – vocals, bass, guitar; Chester Thompson – drums; Ian McDonald – flute, saxophone, guitar, keyboards, vocals	Genesis Revisited (1996) various personnel; The Tokyo Tapes (1998)
Hiatus 1996–2001
2000	Steve Hackett – guitar, vocals; Roger King – keyboards; Phil Mulford – bass; Gary O'Toole – drums, percussion, vocals; Ben Castle – saxophone, flute	none
2001	Steve Hackett – guitar, vocals; Roger King – keyboards; Phil Mulford – bass; Gary O'Toole – drums, percussion, vocals; Rob Townsend – saxophone, flute, percussion, vocals	none
2001–2004	Steve Hackett – guitar, vocals; Roger King – keyboards; Gary O'Toole – drums, percussion, vocals; Rob Townsend – saxophone, flute, percussion, vocals; Terry Gregory – bass, vocals	Somewhere in South America... (2002); To Watch the Storms (2003); Live Archive NEARfest (2003); Live Archive 03 (2004); Live Archive 04 (2004)
2005–2006	Steve Hackett – guitar; Roger King – keyboards; John Hackett – flute	Live Archive 05 (2005); Metamorpheus (2005)
2006–2009	Steve Hackett – guitar, vocals; Roger King – keyboards, guitar; Gary O'Toole – drums, percussion, vocals; Rob Townsend – saxophone, flute, percussion, vocals	Wild Orchids (2006); Tribute (2008) Hackett only
2009–2011	Steve Hackett – guitar, vocals; Roger King – keyboards; Gary O'Toole – drums, percussion, vocals; Rob Townsend – saxophone, flute, percussion, vocals; Amanda Lehmann – guitar, vocals; Nick Beggs – bass, Chapman Stick, vocals	Out of the Tunnel's Mouth (2009); Live Rails (2011); Beyond the Shrouded Horizon (2011); Fire & Ice (2012); Genesis Revisited II (2012) four tracks; Genesis Revisited II: Selection (2013) three tracks
2012	Steve Hackett – guitar, vocals; Roger King – keyboards; Gary O'Toole – drums, percussion, vocals; Rob Townsend – saxophone, flute, percussion, keyboards, vocals; Amanda Lehmann – guitar, vocals; Lee Pomeroy – bass, 12 string guitar, vocals	Genesis Revisited II (2012) five tracks; Genesis Revisited II: Selection (2013) three tracks
2012–2014	Steve Hackett – guitar, vocals; Roger King – keyboards; Gary O'Toole – drums, percussion, vocals; Rob Townsend – saxophone, flute, percussion, keyboards, vocals; Lee Pomeroy – bass, 12 string guitar, vocals; Nad Sylvan – vocals, tambourine	Genesis Revisited II (2012) three tracks; Genesis Revisited II: Selection (2013) one track; Genesis Revisited: Live at Hammersmith (2013); Genesis Revisited: Live at the Royal Albert Hall (2014)
2014–2015	Steve Hackett – guitar, vocals; Roger King – keyboards; Gary O'Toole – drums, percussion, vocals; Rob Townsend – saxophone, flute, percussion, keyboards, vocals; Nad Sylvan – vocals, tambourine; Nick Beggs – bass, Chapman stick, 12 string guitar, vocals	Wolflight (2015)
2015–2016	Steve Hackett – guitar, vocals; Roger King – keyboards; Gary O'Toole – drums, percussion, vocals; Rob Townsend – saxophone, flute, percussion, keyboards, vocals; Nad Sylvan – vocals, tambourine; Roine Stolt – bass, guitar, 12 string guitar, vocals	The Total Experience Live In Liverpool (2016)
2017–2018	Steve Hackett – guitar, vocals; Roger King – keyboards; Gary O'Toole – drums, percussion, vocals; Rob Townsend – saxophone, flute, percussion, keyboards, vocals; Nad Sylvan – vocals, tambourine; Nick Beggs – bass, Chapman stick, 12 string guitar, vocals	The Night Siren (2017) without Beggs and Sylvan; Wuthering Nights: Live in Birmingham (2018)
2018	Steve Hackett – guitar, vocals; Roger King – keyboards; Gary O'Toole – drums, percussion, vocals; Rob Townsend – saxophone, flute, percussion, keyboards, vocals; Nad Sylvan – vocals, tambourine; Jonas Reingold – bass, 12 string guitar, vocals	At the Edge of Light (2019); Genesis Revisited Band & Orchestra: Live at the Royal Festival Hall (2019)
2018–2022	Steve Hackett – guitar, vocals; Roger King – keyboards; Rob Townsend – saxophone, flute, percussion, keyboards, vocals; Nad Sylvan – vocals, tambourine; Jonas Reingold – bass, 12 string guitar, vocals; Craig Blundell – drums, percussion, vocals	Selling England by the Pound & Spectral Mornings: Live at Hammersmith (2020); Surrender of Silence (2021); Genesis Revisited Live: Seconds Out & More (2022)
2022	Steve Hackett – guitar, vocals; Roger King – keyboards; Rob Townsend – saxophone, flute, percussion, keyboards, vocals; Nad Sylvan – vocals, tambourine; Jonas Reingold – bass, 12 string guitar, vocals; Nick D'Virgilio – drums, percussion, vocals	
2022–present	Steve Hackett – guitar, vocals; Roger King – keyboards; Rob Townsend – saxophone, flute, percussion, keyboards, vocals; Nad Sylvan – vocals, tambourine; Jonas Reingold – bass, 12 string guitar, vocals; Craig Blundell – drums, percussion, vocals	Foxtrot at Fifty + Hackett Highlights: Live in Brighton (2023)
