= Cured (album) =

Studio album by Steve Hackett
- Released: 21 August 1981
- Recorded: 1981
- Genres: Progressive pop, pop rock
- Length: 33:51
- Labels: Charisma (UK, Europe & Japan); Epic (US & Canada)
- Producers: John Acock, Steve Hackett, Nick Magnus

Steve Hackett chronology
Defector (1980)	Cured (1981)	Highly Strung (1983)

Singles from Cured
- 1. "Hope I Don't Wake" Released: 21 August 1981; 2. "Picture Postcard" Released: 9 October 1981

Professional ratings
Review scores
Source	Rating
Allmusic	3/5 stars

Cured is the fifth solo album from Genesis guitarist Steve Hackett.

The cover photo was taken by Kim Poor.

In 2007, Cured was remastered and re-released on Virgin Records. The new edition features updated liner notes and three bonus tracks.

== Background ==
Prior to recording Cured, Hackett disbanded the group with which he recorded Spectral Mornings and Defector. Only Hackett's brother, John, and keyboardist Nick Magnus remained from that band. That led him after the Defector tour to be exhausted, and recuperated in Brazil where he spent three months working on new songs. The album is much more pop-oriented than Hackett's previous work, although there are distinct elements of progressive rock. The album is largely a collaboration between Hackett and Magnus. All drum parts were provided by a drum machine due to a limited budget, programmed by Magnus, and Hackett performed all the vocals, making this the first album for him to do so. It was also the first album on which Hackett played bass guitar, something he would not do again until 2019's At the Edge of Light. Production-wise, Hackett cited this album as his least favourite.

== Track listing ==
All songs written by Steve Hackett, with additional writers noted.

1. "Hope I Don't Wake" – 3:48
2. "Picture Postcard" – 3:55
3. "Can't Let Go" – 5:43
4. "The Air-Conditioned Nightmare" – 4:42
5. "Funny Feeling" (Nick Magnus) – 4:07
6. "A Cradle of Swans" – 2:49
7. "Overnight Sleeper" (Kim Poor) – 4:37
8. "Turn Back Time" – 4:23

2007 Remaster Bonus Tracks

1. "Tales of the Riverbank" (Mauro Giuliani, Andante in C, Op 43, Nr 6) - 2:00
2. "Second Chance" – 2:00
3. "The Air-Conditioned Nightmare" (Live) – 4:08

== Personnel ==
- Steve Hackett – guitars, bass guitar, vocals
- Nick Magnus – keyboards, LM-1 drum machine

=== Additional Guests ===
- John Hackett – flute on "Overnight Sleeper", bass pedals on "The Air-Conditioned Nightmare"
- Bimbo Acock – saxophone on "Picture Postcard"

== Charts ==
Chart (1981)	Peak position
Norwegian Albums (VG-lista)	21
Swedish Albums (Sverigetopplistan)	29
UK Albums (Official Charts)	15
US Billboard 200	169
