= Please Don't Touch! =

Studio album by Steve Hackett
- Released: 14 April 1978
- Recorded: November 1977–February 1978
- Studios: Cherokee Studios (Hollywood, California); Kingsway Studios (Wembley, London); Record Plant (Los Angeles, California); De Lane Lea Studios (Soho, London)
- Genres: Progressive rock, art rock
- Length: 38:35
- Labels: Charisma (UK, Europe & Japan); Chrysalis (United States)
- Producers: John Acock; Steve Hackett

Steve Hackett chronology
Voyage of the Acolyte (1975)	Please Don't Touch! (1978)	Spectral Mornings (1979)

Professional ratings
Review scores
Source	Rating
Allmusic	4/5 stars

Please Don't Touch! is the second studio album by English guitarist and songwriter Steve Hackett. It was released on 14 April 1978 on Charisma Records, and it is his first album released after leaving the progressive rock band Genesis in 1977. Hackett had released Voyage of the Acolyte (1975) during his time in Genesis. For his next solo release he recorded in the United States and hired various guest artists, including singers Randy Crawford, Richie Havens, and Steve Walsh, drummers Phil Ehart and Chester Thompson, bassist Tom Fowler, with Van der Graaf Generator violinist Graham Smith.

Following its release, the album reached No. 38 in the United Kingdom and No. 103 in the United States. To promote the album, Hackett assembled a band and completed his first concert tour as a solo artist in 1978. A remastered edition of the album was released in 2005 on Hackett's label Camino Records with bonus tracks. A 5.1 surround mix by Steven Wilson was included on the Premonitions: The Charisma Recordings 1975–1983 in 2015.

== Background ==
In October 1977, news of Hackett's departure from the progressive rock band Genesis was made public. After the band's 1977 tour in support of their eighth studio album Wind & Wuthering (1976) and their first EP, Spot the Pigeon (1977), Hackett informed his bandmates of his decision to leave during the mixing of the live album Seconds Out (1977). Hackett had previously released his debut solo album Voyage of the Acolyte (1975), but he grew increasingly frustrated by the collaborative process of Genesis which left many of his song ideas unreleased. At the time, Hackett was signed to Charisma Records in the UK but to Chrysalis Records in the US. He recalled that both labels had a different idea on what direction they wanted him to take and he later said, "Their opposing viewpoints coloured the album to some degree, although I think the 'European' styled tracks came more naturally to me."

Hackett based the material on Please Don't Touch! on images that had conjured in his mind, and made a conscious effort to capture many different styles of music, including a crossover of white and black music. He wanted to incorporate various strange sounds on the songs for added atmosphere, and visited a Victorian shop named Jack Donovan's that sold old toys. A fairground organ at the pier in Santa Monica, California and a puppet named Bimbo were also recorded.

When the time arrived to record, he decided to record with various guest American musicians and travelled to Los Angeles. He arranged for singers Randy Crawford, Richie Havens, and Steve Walsh to sing on the album, plus bassist Tom Fowler, drummers Phil Ehart and Chester Thompson, with Van der Graaf Generator violinist Graham Smith. He believed America produced "by far the best vocalists" due to their more "street corner heritage". After recording the album, Hackett felt a great amount of pressure off his shoulders. The album's cover was completed by Kim Poor, Hackett's girlfriend of three years and his future wife. It depicts a Victorian couple being attacked by automata in a toy shop.

== Songs ==
=== Side one ===
"Narnia" is a song about childhood, and is based on the children's fantasy novel The Lion, the Witch and the Wardrobe by C.S. Lewis. Hackett wrote it with "a picture of kids skipping around and having fun" in his mind, and wanted Walsh on vocals and Ehart on drums after he liked the a capella vocals on the 1976 Kansas song "Carry on Wayward Son". A version with John Perry on vocals was also recorded. A version of "Narnia" with Walsh on vocals was considered as a potential single for the album, but management at Charisma rejected the idea because they were afraid listeners might be confused and think it was Kansas. The alternate version with Perry on vocals was deemed strong enough as a single, and was released as a bonus track on the 2005 remaster of Please Don't Touch!.

"Carry on Up the Vicarage" is a musical tribute to Agatha Christie. It features vocals from Hackett himself. The vocals during most of the song consist of a double line of an artificially high pitched voice and a low pitched one. Hackett has often used similar distorting effects on his vocals in his solo career. The liner notes indicate that the pipe organ that can be heard on the song is the "Robert Morton pipe organ, since destroyed by fire at the Record Plant". Parts of Please Don't Touch were recorded at the Record Plant's location in Los Angeles; it is known that the location's Studio C was destroyed by fire in early 1978. No information about this organ appears to be available; it is not listed in Robert Morton's opus list.

"Racing in A" also features Steve Walsh on vocals. The song is electric for most of its duration but the last 1:15 is a classical guitar piece, which decreases in pace throughout, finishing on a relaxing note.

"Kim" is named after Poor, who designed many of Hackett's album covers, including Please Don't Touch!. The track features Hackett playing a classical guitar with his brother John Hackett on flute, and was largely inspired by "Gymnopédie No 1" by Erik Satie. When writing it, Hackett had "a quiet lily pond [... a] quiet peaceful day summer feeling".

"How Can I?" is a slow song with Richie Havens on vocals. The members of Genesis were fans of Havens, and the singer agreed to open for them for their series of concerts at Earls Court, London in 1977. Hackett invited him to dinner at his home, during which he requested Havens to feature on a song of his.

=== Side two ===
Side two consists of a suite of songs which flow into each other. It begins with "Hoping Love Will Last" with American singer Randy Crawford on vocals. It has a heavy R&B/soul influence but with some classical style guitar parts as well as atmospheric sections featuring synthesisers. Hackett recalled his Genesis bandmates being particularly fond of the song.

"Land of a Thousand Autumns" is an atmospheric instrumental track which contains references to the main theme of the title track. A sudden drum fill leads into the next track.

"Please Don't Touch" is an instrumental track with many time signature changes that features prominent use of the Roland GR-500 guitar synthesiser. Hackett originally pitched the song for Genesis to rehearse during the Wind & Wuthering sessions, but the song was rejected. It was written as a variation on the main theme of the Wind & Wuthering track "Unquiet Slumbers for the Sleepers...". This theme was also eventually incorporated into the song "Hackett to Bits" on the 1986 album by GTR, a band featuring Hackett and Yes guitarist Steve Howe.

"The Voice of Necam" features references to the "Please Don't Touch" theme before transitioning to an ambient piece of voice drones. NECAM was one of the first mixing console automation systems, developed by the mixing console's manufacturer, AMS Neve; the acronym stood for "Neve Computer Assisted Mixdown". To produce the vocal chords, Hackett sang different notes onto tracks of a multitrack tape, and then made a loop of the tape in a technique similar to that used by 10cc in the song "I'm Not in Love". Each track was fed back to a separate input on the mixing console, and the NECAM system was programmed to "play" chords and melodies by moving the console faders. Hackett later had his vocal tape loops made into a custom Mellotron tape set for use by his live keyboard player Nick Magnus.

"Icarus Ascending" is also sung by Richie Havens. The lyrics are about the Greek myth of Icarus who escaped from the maze of the Minotaur with artificial wings. He came too close to the sun, though, and the wax in his wings melted so that he fell to his death.

== Release ==
A late April 1978 report from Record Mirror published that 11,200 copies of the album had been sold. Following its release, the album reached No. 38 in the United Kingdom and No. 103 in the United States. To promote the album, Hackett assembled a band and completed his first concert tour as a solo artist in 1978.

== Track listing ==
All tracks written by Steve Hackett.

Side one
No.	Title	Lead vocals	Length
1.	"Narnia"	Steve Walsh	4:05
2.	"Carry on up the Vicarage"	Steve Hackett	3:11
3.	"Racing in A"	Steve Walsh	5:07
4.	"Kim"	(instrumental)	2:13
5.	"How Can I?"	Richie Havens	4:38

Side two
No.	Title	Lead vocals	Length
6.	"Hoping Love Will Last"	Randy Crawford	4:23
7.	"Land of a Thousand Autumns"	(instrumental)	1:38
8.	"Please Don't Touch"	(instrumental)	3:39
9.	"The Voice of Necam"	(instrumental)	3:11
10.	"Icarus Ascending"	Richie Havens	6:27

=== 2005 remaster bonus tracks ===
11. "Narnia" (John Perry Vocal Version) – 3:36
12. "Land of a Thousand Autumns/Please Don't Touch" (Live) – 7:53
13. "Narnia" (Alternate Version with Steve Walsh on vocals) – 4:30

== Notes ==
- The original CD release had four seconds of silence between "Land of a Thousand Autumns" and "Please Don't Touch." This was a mistake that was corrected on the remastered version.

== Personnel ==
Musicians

- Steve Hackett – keyboards, Mellotron, electric guitars, acoustic guitars, Roland GR-500 guitar synthesizer, percussion, loops, effects, bells, backing vocals (1, 3, 9, 10), vocals (2)
- John Acock – keyboards
- John Hackett – keyboards, flute, piccolo, bass pedals
- David LeBolt – keyboards
- Tom Fowler – electric bass
- Phil Ehart – drums (1, 3), percussion (1, 3)
- Chester Thompson – drums (2, 4–10), percussion (2, 4–10)
- James Bradley – percussion
- Richie Havens – percussion
- Hugh Malloy – cello
- Graham Smith – violin

Guest singers

- Steve Walsh – lead vocals (1, 3)
- Richie Havens – lead vocals (5, 10)
- Randy Crawford – lead vocals (6)
- Maria Bonvino – guest female soprano (6)
- "Feydor" – vocals (9) (This is a joke credit, being a pun on "fader.")
- Dale Newman – guest vocals (10)
- Dan Owen – guest vocals (10)
- John Perry – lead vocals on "Narnia" (11)

== Charts ==
Chart (1978)	Peak position
Australian Albums (Kent Music Report)|	88
German Albums (Offizielle Top 100)	49
Swedish Albums (Sverigetopplistan)	23
UK Albums (Official Charts)	38
US Billboard 200	103
