= Spectral Mornings =

Studio album by Steve Hackett
- Released: 11 May 1979
- Recorded: January–February 1979
- Studios: Phonogram Studios, Hilversum, The Netherlands
- Genre: Progressive rock
- Length: 39:03
- Labels: Charisma (UK, Europe & Japan); Chrysalis (United States)
- Producers: John Acock, Steve Hackett

Steve Hackett chronology
Please Don't Touch! (1978)	Spectral Mornings (1979)	Defector (1980)

Professional ratings
Review scores
Source	Rating
Allmusic	3.5/5 stars
Music Week	4/4 stars

Spectral Mornings is the third studio album by English guitarist and songwriter Steve Hackett, released in May 1979 on Charisma Records. It is his first to feature members of his touring band, which many Hackett fans consider as the "classic line-up". The musicians are his brother John Hackett, Nick Magnus, Dik Cadbury, John Shearer, and Pete Hicks.

In 2005, Spectral Mornings was remastered and re-released on Virgin Records. The new edition features updated liner notes and bonus tracks. A new 5.1 surround mix of the album by Steven Wilson is included in Hackett's 2015 compilation box set Premonitions: The Charisma Recordings 1975–1983. In 2015, Hackett appeared on a re-recorded version, "Spectral Mornings 2015", with new lyrics written by David Longdon of Big Big Train, and sung by Longdon and Christina Booth of Magenta. Proceeds from the track on release went to Parkinson's Society UK.

== Background ==
After the release of his previous album, Please Don't Touch!, in 1978, Hackett wished to tour the material from the album along with material from his previous solo album, Voyage of the Acolyte. This meant that he needed to assemble a touring band since the personnel on Please Don't Touch! had essentially consisted of guest musicians. The band that he created for this purpose became the band that he used in the studio for Spectral Mornings and the following album, 1980's Defector.

== Recording ==
"Clocks - The Angel of Mons" and the title track were both written and performed live on the Please Don't Touch tour prior to the album's recording. Elements of the intro performed going into "Please Don't Touch" later became parts of "Tigermoth".

The album was recorded at Phonogram Studios in Hilversum in the Netherlands between January and February 1979. Hackett later remarked "It was 15 degrees below zero and all the lakes and canals were frozen... The weather was so bad that all we could do was apply ourselves to work. The studio was at Phonogram Records' headquarters and it felt as though it was in its own world. We played night and day and combined this activity with partying like crazy. The sessions were intense and the album was recorded with very little sleep. We all got a tremendous buzz from recording it as we felt that it would be well received. I was confident when I finally played the final masters to Tony Stratton-Smith at Charisma as I thought we'd done a great job."

This is the second album for which Hackett used a Roland GR-500 Guitar Synthesizer. It can be heard on two tracks: "The Virgin and the Gypsy" and "Tigermoth".

Lead vocals on most of the album were provided by Pete Hicks, which were very often backed with harmonies by Steve Hackett and Dik Cadbury. Cadbury arranged the harmony vocals, having been trained as a counter tenor (falsetto) singer. Hackett himself sings lead on "The Ballad of the Decomposing Man".

== Songs ==
=== Side one ===
The album starts with "Every Day" which is an anti-drug song about Steve's own experiences of the drug culture when his first girlfriend fell victim to "Cleopatra's Needle", and it would become his signature song from his solo career with a guitar solo at the track's coda.

"The Virgin and the Gypsy" was inspired by the novella of the same name. It has an acoustic folk sound with vocal harmonies, twelve tracks of 12-string guitars mixed together, a guitar synthesizer solo, harpsichord and double-tracking flutes solos. Parts of the song were previously recorded in sessions for Please Don't Touch in an instrumental called "Seven of Cups".

"The Red Flower of Tachai Blooms Everywhere" was inspired by east-Asian culture. Hackett plays a Cantonese koto on the track, accompanied by a Mellotron imitating a Japanese singer, flute and gong percussion. This track would later be listed under alternate spellings ("Ta Chai" or "Tai Chi") on subsequent live albums.

"Clocks - The Angel of Mons" was considered for a horror movie soundtrack. Drummer John Shearer plays a long drum solo at the climax of the track, the power of which Hackett compared to sounding like "being trampled by elephants". John Hackett plays a Moog Taurus bass pedal synthesizer on this track using his hands as opposed to his feet. The track is often listed on live albums under the shortened title "Clocks."

"The Ballad of the Decomposing Man" is sung by Hackett in a tongue-in-cheek George Formby-style, in which Hackett displays a sense of humour like songs on the previous Genesis albums with Peter Gabriel such as "Harold the Barrel". Hackett also plays the harmonica for the first time on his albums in this track. The second half of the song, "The Office Party" was played in a calypso style with a lot of percussion, violin from bassist Dik Cadbury and comical speaking.

=== Side two ===
Side two opens with "Lost Time in Cordoba" which is a classical guitar and flute duet, in a style similar to Hackett's future classical guitar albums such as Bay of Kings.

"Tigermoth" is a ghost story told from the perspectives of several pilots from the Second World War, shot down whilst flying planes of the same name. The first half of the track has a dramatic feel with jarring Mellotron chords, bass pedals and guitar synthesizer. The acoustic second half contains Hicks's vocals and a lullaby ending.

The album finishes with the title track, which began life as a vocal piece. However, after Hackett played the vocal melody to his band on the guitar, Pete Hicks decided that the track sounded "great as it is", telling Hackett to "keep the piece as an instrumental", leading Hackett to joke later on that Hicks talked himself out of a job on the track. It has become his signature instrumental from his solo career. Many progressive rock guitarists, such as Steve Rothery (from Marillion), consider this track to be an inspiration.

== Track listing ==
All tracks are written by Steve Hackett, except where indicated.

Side One
No.	Title	Length
1.	"Every Day"	6:14
2.	"The Virgin and the Gypsy"	4:27
3.	"The Red Flower of Tachai Blooms Everywhere"	2:05
4.	"Clocks - The Angel of Mons"	4:17
5.	"The Ballad of the Decomposing Man (featuring "The Office Party")"	3:49

Side Two
No.	Title	Length
1.	"Lost Time in Córdoba"	4:03
2.	"Tigermoth"	7:35
3.	"Spectral Mornings"	6:33

=== 2005 remaster bonus tracks ===
No.	Title	Length
1.	"Every Day (Alternate Mix)"	7:08
2.	"The Virgin and the Gypsy (Alternate Mix)"	4:29
3.	"Tigermoth (Alternate Mix)"	3:19
4.	"The Ballad of the Decomposing Man (Alternate Mix)"	4:23
5.	"Clocks (12" Single Version)"	3:37
6.	"Live Acoustic Set (Etude in A Minor, Blood on the Rooftops, Horizons, Kim)"	5:40
7.	"Tigermoth (Live version)"	3:58
8.	"The Caretaker" ("The Caretaker" was a hidden joke track that had appeared on some early CD copies of the album. It features the vocalist Pete Hicks, here as a studio cleaner, being angry with the musicians about the mess that they made working in the studio.)	1:41

== Personnel ==
- Steve Hackett – electric and acoustic guitars, Roland GR-500 guitar synthesizer, lead vocals and harmonica on "The Ballad of the Decomposing Man", harmony/backing vocals on "Every Day" and "The Virgin and the Gypsy", koto on "The Red Flowers of Tachai Blooms Everywhere"
- Pete Hicks – lead vocals on "Every Day", "The Virgin and the Gypsy", and "Tigermoth"
- Dik Cadbury – bass guitar, harmony/backing vocals on "Every Day", "The Virgin and the Gypsy", and "Tigermoth", Moog Taurus bass pedals, violin on "The Ballad of the Decomposing Man"
- Nick Magnus – keyboards, Vox String Thing, Novatron, clavinet, Fender Rhodes & RMI electric pianos, Minimoog, Mini-Korg 700, Roland String Synth RS-202 & SH-2000, harpsichord on "The Virgin and the Gypsy"
- John Hackett – flute, bamboo flute on "The Virgin and the Gypsy", Moog Taurus bass pedals on "Clocks - The Angel of Mons"
- John Shearer – drums, percussion

== Tour ==
Hackett toured the album with the same band in 1979. A recording of an entire show on this tour, performed at the Hammersmith Odeon, is found on Discs 1 and 2 of Live Archive 70s 80s 90s, released in 2001. The following day's show at the New Theatre, Oxford was also recorded, but that show's recording remained unreleased until 2015, when they were eventually released as part of the Premonitions: The Charisma Recordings 1975-1983 boxset.

In 2019, to mark the 40th anniversary of the album's release, Hackett toured most of the songs from the album, as the first set of his "Genesis Revisited 2019" tour.

== Charts ==
Chart (1979)	Peak position
Swedish Albums (Sverigetopplistan)	30
UK Albums (Official Charts)	22
US Billboard 200	138
