= Defector (Steve Hackett album) =

Studio album by Steve Hackett
- Released: 13 June 1980
- Recorded: Spring 1980
- Studio: Wessex Sound Studios (Highbury, London)
- Genre: Progressive rock
- Length: 36:52
- Label: Charisma (UK, Europe & Japan); Mercury (United States)
- Producer: Steve Hackett; John Acock

Steve Hackett chronology
Spectral Mornings (1979)	Defector (1980)	Cured (1981)

Defector is the fourth studio album by English guitarist Steve Hackett, released in June 1980 on Charisma Records. After touring in support of his previous album, Spectral Mornings (1979), Hackett took his band into Wessex Sound Studios to record a follow-up.

The album remains Hackett's highest charting album on the UK Albums Chart, reaching No. 9. "The Show" was released as a single. In 2005, Defector was remastered and re-released on Virgin Records. The new edition features updated liner notes and five bonus tracks. A surround mix was included in the Premonitions: The Charisma Recordings 1975–1983 box set.

== Background ==
By early 1980, Hackett had finished touring his previous album, Spectral Mornings (1979) which at the time of release, became his strongest selling album. Hackett wanted to capitalise on the commercial momentum he had achieved by rehearsing new material for a follow-up with his touring band prior to recording it in a studio. This way, he could finish it quickly and resume touring. Hackett found new sources of inspiration in his writing, specifically the 1970 political drama film The Conformist as a model for the imagery that he conjured in his mind and used to write the songs. He had spent Christmas of 1979 in Washington, D.C. which resulted in "more and more thoughts about less romantic things". "Slogans" reminded him of an out of control vehicle, and thought of "a mob feel; something run riot", futuristic, and propaganda themes. Though the album is a collection of songs, Hackett described its underlying theme: "There's a lot of heavy kind of claustrophobic kind of feelings from the idea of someone being trapped in a situation (in the broadest sense of the word) and having to move away to something else, somewhere else, somebody else... I see it more in terms of 'Defector' as a metaphor really and music as the supreme language of metaphor".

== Recording ==
Defector was recorded in the spring of 1980 at Wessex Sound Studios in Highbury, north London. As the material was already rehearsed, Hackett noted that recording was quickly done, yet without cutting corners on the production as he had typically spent more time "getting things right" in the past. Following its release, Hackett had become increasingly aware of the musical direction of his past albums, and aimed for his next one to sound "less monumental".

== Release ==
Professional ratings
Review scores
Source	Rating
Allmusic	2.5/5 stars

Defector reached No. 9 on the UK Albums Chart, and remains Hackett's highest charting album in the UK. "The Show" was released as a single. Hackett supported the album with a sell-out UK tour In addition, he performed for the first time as a solo artist in North America.

== Track listing ==
All songs written by Steve Hackett, except where indicated.

Side 1

1. "The Steppes" – 6:05
2. "Time to Get Out" – 4:11
3. "Slogans" – 3:46
4. "Leaving" – 3:16
5. "Two Vamps as Guests" – 1:58

Side 2

1. "Jacuzzi" – 4:36
2. "Hammer in the Sand" – 3:11
3. "The Toast" – 3:42
4. "The Show" – 3:40
5. "Sentimental Institution" (Steve Hackett, Peter Hicks) – 2:44

2005 Remaster Bonus Tracks

1. "Hercules Unchained" (B-side of "The Show") (Steve Hackett, Peter Hicks) – 2:44
2. "Sentimental Institution" (Live at the Theatre Royal, Drury Lane) (Steve Hackett, Peter Hicks) – 3:02
3. "The Steppes" (Live at the Reading Festival) – 6:33
4. "Slogans" (Live at the Reading Festival) – 4:19
5. "Clocks – The Angel of Mons" (Live at the Reading Festival) – 5:54

2016 Remaster Bonus Tracks and DVD - new pseudo-5.1 Surround Sound up-mix from the original stereo master tapes

Live at the Reading Festival 1981

1. "The Air Conditioned Nightmare" – 4:42
2. "Every Day" – 6:48
3. "Ace of Wands" – 6:45
4. "Funny Feeling" – 4:17
5. "The Steppes" – 6:12
6. "Overnight Sleeper" – 4:52
7. "Slogans" – 4:42
8. "A Tower Struck Down" – 3:13
9. "Spectral Mornings" – 6:10
10. "The Show" – 4:32
11. "Clocks - The Angel of Mons" – 6:05

== Personnel ==
- Steve Hackett – electric and acoustic guitars, harmony/backing vocals on "Time to Get Out," "Leaving," "The Toast", Optigan on "Sentimental Institution", Roland GR-500 guitar synthesizer
- Pete Hicks – lead vocals on "Leaving," "The Show," "Sentimental Institution," harmony vocals on "Time to Get Out," "The Toast"
- Dik Cadbury – bass guitar, Moog Taurus bass pedals, harmony/backing vocals on "Time to Get Out," "Leaving," "The Toast," "The Show"
- Nick Magnus – keyboards, Prophet 5, Clavinet, Fender Rhodes & RMI electric pianos, Novatron, Vox String Thing, Minimoog, Roland SH-2000, Roland Vp-330 Vocoder on "Slogans", piano on "Hammer In The Sand"
- John Hackett – concert and alto flute
- John Shearer – drums, percussion

Production

- Steve Hackett – production
- John Acock – production
- Jed and Vince – gear
- Kim Poor – insight and cover paintings, enamels, cover design
- Kim and Kobz – cover design
- Danny Padua – inner sleeve
- Armando Gallo – collage photos
- Gered Mankowitz – collage photos

== Charts ==
Chart (1980)	Peak position
Norwegian Albums (VG-lista)	22
Swedish Albums (Sverigetopplistan)	30
UK Albums (OCC)	9
US Billboard 200	144
