= Tokyo Tapes =

Tokyo Tapes may refer to:

- The Tokyo Tapes, a 1999 album by Steve Hackett
- Tokyo Tapes (album), a 1978 live album by the Scorpions
