= She Said Maybe =

She Said Maybe may refer to:

- "She Said Maybe", a 2011 song by Steve Hackett from Beyond the Shrouded Horizon
- She Said Maybe, a 2025 film featuring Serkan Çayoğlu
