= Beyond the Shrouded Horizon =

Studio album by Steve Hackett
- Released: 26 September 2011
- Recorded: 2010–2011
- Genre: Progressive rock
- Length: 57:52
- Label: Wolfwork/InsideOut Music/Century Media/WHD Entertainment (Japan)
- Producers: Steve Hackett; Roger King

Steve Hackett chronology
Live Rails (2011)	Beyond the Shrouded Horizon (2011)	Genesis Revisited II (2012)

Professional ratings
Review scores
Source	Rating
AllMusic	3.5/5 stars

Beyond the Shrouded Horizon is the twenty-first studio album by English guitarist and songwriter Steve Hackett.

== Background and recording ==
"Loch Lomond" is named after the loch of the same name in Scotland. Hackett described the track as blues-influenced which changes to European music once the strings are heard. The lyrics contain many contradictory images, such as a hummingbird in the snow. Though the song contains what sound like bagpipes, Hackett revealed that the sound is in fact a mix of bagpipe samples and a saxophone with the reed "turned around the other way".

== Track listing ==
1. "Loch Lomond" (Steve Hackett, Jo Hackett, Roger King) – 6:50
2. "The Phoenix Flown" (Steve Hackett, Jo Hackett, King) – 2:08
3. "Wanderlust" (Steve Hackett, Jo Hackett, King) – 0:44
4. "Til These Eyes" (Steve Hackett, Jo Hackett, King) – 2:41
5. "Prairie Angel" (Steve Hackett, Jo Hackett, Steve Howe, Jonathan Mover) – 2:59
6. "A Place Called Freedom" (Steve Hackett, Jo Hackett, King) – 5:57
7. "Between the Sunset and the Coconut Palms" (Steve Hackett, Jo Hackett, King) – 3:18
8. "Waking to Life" (Steve Hackett, Jo Hackett, King) – 4:50
9. "Two Faces of Cairo" (Steve Hackett, Jo Hackett, King) – 5:13
10. "Looking for Fantasy" (Steve Hackett, Jo Hackett, King) – 4:33
11. "Summer's Breath" (Steve Hackett, Jo Hackett, King) – 1:12
12. "Catwalk" (Steve Hackett, Jo Hackett, King) – 5:44
13. "Turn This Island Earth" (Steve Hackett, Jo Hackett, Steve Howe, Roger King, Jonathan Mover) – 11:51

Bonus CD (limited special edition only)

1. "Four Winds: North" (Steve Hackett, King) – 1:35
2. "Four Winds: South" (Steve Hackett, King) – 2:06
3. "Four Winds: East" (Steve Hackett, Fenner) – 3:34 (previously appeared on Japan edition of Darktown as "The Well at the World's End")
4. "Four Winds: West" (Steve Hackett, King) – 3:04 (previously appeared on Marco Lo Muscio's The Book of Bilbo and Gandalf as "Galadriel")
5. "Pieds En L'Air" (Peter Warlock) – 2:26
6. "She Said Maybe" (Steve Hackett, King) – 4:21
7. "Enter the Night" (Steve Hackett, Jo Hackett, King) – 4:00 (vocal version of "Depth Charge," a.k.a. "Riding the Colossus," from various previous albums)
8. "Eruption: Tommy" (Thijs van Leer) – 3:37 (previously appeared on Japan edition of Wild Orchids)
9. "Reconditioned Nightmare" (Hackett) – 4:06 (previously appeared on Japan edition of Wild Orchids)

== Personnel ==
Normal release

- Steve Hackett – guitars, vocals, harmonica (1–13)
- Nick Beggs – bass, chapman stick, pink ukulele (1, 6)
- Dick Driver – double bass (4, 7, 10, 13)
- John Hackett – flute (9) vocals (7)
- Roger King – keyboards, programming (1–13)
- Amanda Lehmann – vocals (1, 6, 8) guitar (5, 6)
- Gary O'Toole – drums (1, 2, 5, 8, 9) vocals (1, 6,)
- Simon Phillips – drums (12, 13)
- Chris Squire – bass (10, 12, 13)
- Richard Stewart – cello (4, 7, 9, 10)
- Christine Townsend – violin, viola (4, 7, 9, 10)
- Rob Townsend – saxophone, whistle, bass clarinet (1, 4, 5, 6, 8)

Bonus CD

- Steve Hackett – guitars, vocals (1–4, 6–9)
- Dick Driver – double bass (5)
- Benedict Fenner – keyboards, programming (3)
- Roger King – keyboards, programming (1, 2, 6–9)
- Amanda Lehmann – vocals (7)
- Gary O'Toole – drums, vocals (7)
- Simon Phillips – drums (1)
- Chris Squire – bass (1, 7)
- Richard Stewart – cello (5)
- Christine Townsend – violin, viola (5)

Cover photo

- Harry Pearce

== Charts ==
Chart (2011)	Peak position
German Albums (Offizielle Top 100)	63
