= Darktown (album) =

Studio album by Steve Hackett
- Released: 26 April 1999
- Genre: Progressive rock
- Length: 56:33 (Original issue) 71:39 (2013 reissue)
- Label: InsideOut Music
- Producer: Steve Hackett; Roger King

Steve Hackett chronology
The Tokyo Tapes (1998)	Darktown (1999)	Sketches of Satie (2000)

Professional ratings
Review scores
Source	Rating
Allmusic	3/5 stars

Darktown is the 14th studio album by English musician Steve Hackett, released in 1999. It was reissued in 2013 with 3 bonus tracks. On some copies of this reissue, the title was misspelled as "Darktwon" on the sides of the CD case.

Darktown is the last album to feature Julian Colbeck as a keyboardist, on the title track only. Colbeck had played with Hackett for much of the 1990s. Darktown shows the increasing role that Roger King would play as a part of Hackett's band, as a producer and keyboardist and later as a co-writer.

I decided at the time to express my feelings as honestly as possible without giving into commercial pressures, with the belief that personal inspiration could be most universally potent. I was re-evaluating the past, whilst contemplating possible futures. It was the beginning of a new way of looking at things.

— Steve Hackett on Darktown

== Track listing ==
All songs written by Steve Hackett, except indicated.

1. "Omega Metallicus" – 3:48
2. "Darktown" – 4:59
3. "Man Overboard" – 4:17
4. "The Golden Age of Steam" – 4:09
5. "Days of Long Ago" (Hackett, Diamond) – 3:23
6. "Dreaming with Open Eyes" – 6:54
7. "Twice Around the Sun" – 7:15
8. "Rise Again" – 4:26
9. "Jane Austen's Door" – 6:13
10. "Darktown Riot" – 3:10
11. "In Memoriam" – 7:59

=== 1999 Japanese bonus tracks ===
1. "The Well at the World's End" (Instrumental) – 3:52
2. "Comin' Home to the Blues" – 6:12 Japan Edition

=== 2013 Reissue bonus tracks ===
1. "Flame" – 4:21
2. "Coming Home to the Blues" – 6:13
3. "Fast Flower" – 4:32

"Flame" had previously been released on the Japanese edition of Hackett's 2003 album To Watch the Storms, "Coming Home to the Blues" on the Japanese edition of Darktown and "Fast Flower" on the Japanese edition of Hackett's 2009 album Out of the Tunnel's Mouth.

== Personnel ==
- Billy Budis – cello
- Julian Colbeck – keyboards
- Hugo Degenhardt – drums
- Jim Diamond – vocals
- Ben Fenner – mellotron
- Bob Fenner – guitar, recorder
- Aron Friedman – piano, keyboards
- John Hackett – flute, pan pipes
- Steve Hackett – guitar, harmonica, piano, strings, violin, vocals, choir, chorus, 12 string guitar, woodwind, rainstick, sequencing, orchestration, 12-string bass guitar, nylon string guitar, voiceover
- Roger King – bass, drums, flageolet, keyboards, woodwind, wood
- Ian McDonald – saxophone
- Jerry Peal – strings, bells, woodwind
- Doug Sinclair – bass, fretless bass
- John Wetton – bass samples

=== Production ===
- Richard Buckland – engineer, ambience
- Billy Budis – engineer, mixing, management
- Paul Cox – photography, portrait photography
- Jamie McKena – choir coordinator
- Harry Pearce – photography
- Lippa Pearce – design

== Charts ==
Chart (1999)	Peak position
UK Independent Albums (OCC)	22
