= Out of the Tunnel's Mouth =

Studio album by Steve Hackett
- Released: 30 October 2009
- Recorded: 2008–2009
- Studio: The Living Room, Twickenham, London
- Genre: Progressive rock
- Length: 45:42
- Label: Wolfwork/EAR Music
- Producer: Steve Hackett, Roger King

Steve Hackett chronology
Tribute (2008)	Out of the Tunnel's Mouth (2009)	Live Rails (2011)

Out of the Tunnel's Mouth is the 20th studio album by English guitarist and songwriter Steve Hackett, released in October 2009 by Wolfwork and EAR Music. Hackett started recording the album in 2008 while he was involved in a legal case against his ex-wife Kim Poor, which created problems regarding its release. As a result, recording took place in his living room with his touring keyboardist Roger King serving as co-producer. The album includes performances by founding Genesis guitarist Anthony Phillips and Yes bassist Chris Squire.

Out of the Tunnel's Mouth was initially available through Hackett's website and his live shows, until it received a formal release by InsideOut Music in April 2010. This included a 2-CD Special Edition with an extra disc two containing live tracks from the 2009 tour and a previously unreleased studio track. Hackett supported the album with his Around the World in 80 Trains Tour, recordings from which were released on the live album Live Rails (2011).

== Songs ==
"Last Train to Istanbul" shows influences from Turkey. Chris Squire makes appearances on "Fire on the Moon" and "Nomads". Nick Beggs provides bass and Chapman Stick for the remaining songs. An additional guest is founding Genesis guitarist Anthony Phillips on "Emerald and Ash" and "Sleepers".

== Track listing ==
1. "Fire on the Moon" (Steve Hackett)
2. "Nomads" (Hackett, Jo Lehmann)
3. "Emerald and Ash" (Hackett, Roger King)
4. "Tubehead" (Hackett, King)
5. "Sleepers" (Hackett, Nick Clabburn, King, Lehmann)
6. "Ghost in the Glass" (Hackett, King)
7. "Still Waters" (Hackett, Lehmann)
8. "Last Train to Istanbul" (Hackett, King, Lehmann)

Special edition bonus CD

1. "Blood on the Rooftops" [Live] (Phil Collins, Hackett)
2. "A Tower Struck Down" [Live] (Steve Hackett, John Hackett)
3. "Firth of Fifth" [Live] (Tony Banks, Collins, Peter Gabriel, Hackett, Mike Rutherford)
4. "Fly on a Windshield" [Live] (Banks, Collins, Gabriel, Hackett, Rutherford)
5. "Broadway Melody of 1974" [Live] (Banks, Collins, Gabriel, Hackett, Rutherford)
6. "Every Star in the Night Sky" (Note: This track is a modified version of "Sleepers," with a brief excerpt from "Still Waters" included.) (Hackett, Clabburn, King, Lehmann)

Special edition CD Japan only bonus tracks

1. "Every Day" [Live at Club Citta] (Hackett)
2. "Fast Flower" (Hackett)

== Personnel ==
Studio tracks

- Steve Hackett – vocals, guitars (1–8)
- Anthony Phillips – 12-string guitar (3, 5)
- Chris Squire – bass guitar (1, 2)
- Nick Beggs – bass guitar, Chapman stick (2, 3, 5–7)
- Dick Driver – double bass (5)
- Christine Townsend – violin, viola (5, 6, 8)
- Ferenc Kovacs – violin (8)
- Roger King – keyboards, programming (1–8)
- John Hackett – flute (5, 8)
- Amanda Lehmann – vocals (3, 5, 7)
- Jo Lehmann – backing vocals (7)
- Lauren King – backing vocals (7)
- Rob Townsend – soprano saxophone (3, 8)
- Anklung on "Every Star in the Night Sky" by Egerhazi Attila, Barabas Tamas, Kovacs Ferenc, Kovacs Zoltan, Banai Szilard, Steve Hackett, Jo Lehmann

Live tracks

- Steve Hackett – guitars, vocals
- Nick Beggs – bass guitar, Chapman stick, vocals
- Roger King – keyboards
- Gary O'Toole – drums, lead vocals
- Rob Townsend – saxophone, flute, whistle, percussion
