= Highly Strung =

Studio album by Steve Hackett
- Released: April 1983
- Recorded: February–November 1982
- Studios: Berry Street Studios, Marcus Music, and Redan Recorders in London
- Genres: Progressive pop, pop rock
- Length: 37:01
- Labels: Charisma (UK, Europe & Japan); Epic (US & Canada)
- Producers: John Acock and Steve Hackett

Steve Hackett chronology
Cured (1981)	Highly Strung (1983)	Bay of Kings (1983)

Professional ratings
Review scores
Source	Rating
Allmusic	4/5 stars

Highly Strung is the sixth studio album by English guitarist and songwriter Steve Hackett. "Cell 151" was a minor hit from the album, and charted in the UK. Added to Hackett's band was drummer Ian Mosley, who would join Marillion in 1984. This was Hackett's final studio release for Charisma.

In 2007, Highly Strung was remastered and re-released on Virgin Records. The new edition features updated liner notes and three bonus tracks.

The front cover painting is, as on many of Hackett's albums, by his then-wife Kim Poor.

== Background ==
By the time Hackett started work on Highly Strung his relationship with management at Charisma Records, with whom he had been signed since the beginning of his solo career, had started to decline. The label began to interfere with Hackett's creative decisions, and the guitarist had noticed that the company was "in disarray" at the time. His wish to cater to audience demands and have a live album released went against the label's wishes. He added: "A&R were starting to make comments and requests which didn't fit the MD's ideas and it left me in the middle trying to steer a sensible course". The result led to Highly Strung being a difficult album for Hackett to complete, a process that lasted eighteen months. Among the difficulties faced was the label's suggestion for Hackett to work with a producer from the beginning, but the guitarist recalled that Charisma failed to agree on one. In addition, Hackett said that management disliked the end product due to his decision to sing lead vocals when they were against the idea. Eight different mixes of "Cell 151" were produced and played back to management at Charisma. Hackett found the experience unpleasant and compared it to an audition for winning the support of a label.

Hackett looked back on the album and rated Highly Strung as a fragmented album, "possibly falling into two halves of the song type and the blowing type", with "Camino Royale" being an example song that had more drive.

== Track listing ==
All tracks written by Steve Hackett, except where noted.

1. "Camino Royale" (Hackett, Magnus) – 5:28
2. "Cell 151" – 6:25
3. "Always Somewhere Else" – 4:02
4. "Walking Through Walls" – 3:48
5. "Give It Away" – 4:08
6. "Weightless" – 3:31
7. "Group Therapy" – 5:47
8. "India Rubber Man" – 2:31
9. "Hackett to Pieces" (Hackett, Magnus) – 2:40

2007 Remaster Bonus Tracks

1. "Guitar Boogie" (Chuck Berry) – 2:12
2. "Walking Through Walls" (12" version) – 5:55
3. "Time Lapse at Milton Keynes" – 3:52

== Alternate US LP Track listing ==
The US LP version of the album had a different track order than that found on other versions of the album. The LP's version of the song Walking Through Walls is also different.

Side One

1. "Cell 151"
2. "Give It Away"
3. "Camino Royale"
4. "Always Somewhere Else"

Side Two

1. "Walking Through Walls" (12" version)
2. "Weightless"
3. "Group Therapy"
4. "India Rubber Man"
5. "Hackett to Pieces"

== Single Releases ==
"Cell 151" This was released a single (see discography for listing) and briefly charted becoming Hackett's only solo single hit reaching number 66 in the UK charts in April 1983 for a two-week run.

== Personnel ==
- Steve Hackett – guitars, harmonica, vocals
- Chris Lawrence – contrabass
- Nigel Warren-Green – cello
- Nick Magnus – keyboards, vocoder, producer, engineering
- John Acock - synthesisers, engineering
- Ian Mosley – drums

== Charts ==
Chart (1983)	Peak position
UK Albums (Official Charts)	16
