= Live Rails =

Live album by Steve Hackett
- Released: 3 May 2011
- Recorded: 2009/2010
- Venue: Paris, London, New York
- Genre: Progressive rock
- Length: 115:55
- Label: Inside Out Music

Steve Hackett chronology
Out of the Tunnel's Mouth (2009)	Live Rails (2011)	Beyond the Shrouded Horizon (2011)

Professional ratings
Review scores
Source	Rating
AllMusic	3.5/5 stars

Live Rails is an album by musician Steve Hackett. It was recorded during the tour around the release of Out of the Tunnel's Mouth. It is also one of several of Hackett's official live releases beginning with The Tokyo Tapes (1998) to feature a growing number of Genesis songs. The inclusion of these songs foreshadows Hackett's Genesis Revisited tours, which began in 2013.

== Track listing ==
Disc 1

1. "Intro" 2:18
2. "Every Day" 6:51
3. "Fire on the Moon" 6:17
4. "Emerald and Ash" 9:00
5. "Ghost in the Glass" 3:23
6. "Ace of Wands" 6:48
7. "Pollution C" 2:21
8. "The Steppes" 6:01
9. "Slogans" 4:22
10. "Serpentine" 6:43
11. "Tubehead" 6:06

Disc 2

1. "Spectral Mornings" 5:58
2. "Firth of Fifth" 10:39
3. "Blood on the Rooftops" 6:31
4. "Fly on a Windshield" 2:07
5. "Broadway Melody of 1974" 1:47
6. "Sleepers" 7:32
7. "Still Waters" 5:31
8. "Los Endos" 7:44
9. "Clocks" 8:05

== Musicians ==
- Steve Hackett – guitar, vocals
- Amanda Lehmann – vocals, guitar
- Nick Beggs – bass, Chapman Stick, vocals, Taurus bass pedals
- Roger King – keyboards
- Rob Townsend – whistle, flute, percussion, saxophone, keyboards, vocals
- Gary O'Toole – drums
