= Metamorpheus =

Studio album by Steve Hackett
- Released: 28 March 2005
- Recorded: 2004
- Genre: Contemporary classical
- Label: Camino Records (UK)
- Producer: Steve Hackett

Steve Hackett chronology
To Watch the Storms (2003)	Metamorpheus (2005)	Wild Orchids (2006)

Professional ratings
Review scores
Source	Rating
Allmusic	3.5/5 stars

Metamorpheus is Steve Hackett's 17th studio album. This classical album is the successor to A Midsummer Nights Dream. Metamorpheus is an expression on Orpheus and his passage through the Underworld.

The cover of the album was painted by Kim Poor. A section of the same painting was used in the booklet of the previous album To Watch The Storms as an illustration for the song "Rebecca."

This album makes use of themes first used by Hackett in short pieces (only released as free MP3 downloads) for the soundtrack of the 2001 Showtime documentary Outwitting Hitler.

== Track listing ==
1. "The Pool of Memory and the Pool of Forgetfulness" – 2:15
2. "To Earth Like Rain" – 1:33
3. "Song to Nature" – 3:02
4. "One Real Flower" – 3:12
5. "The Dancing Ground" – 3:02
6. "That Vast Life" – 12:27
7. "Eurydice Taken" – 1:48
8. "Charon's Call" – 3:15
9. "Cerberus at Peace" – 2:06
10. "Under the World – Orpheus Looks Back" – 5:16
11. "The Broken Lyre" – 3:17
12. "Severance" – 3:05
13. "Elegy" – 3:18
14. "Return to the Realm of Eternal Renewal" – 2:56
15. "Lyra" – 6:36

== Personnel ==
- Steve Hackett – guitars
- John Hackett – flute, piccolo, orchestral arrangements
- Dick Driver – double bass
- Lucy Wilkins – violin
- Richard Stewart – cello
- Sara Wilson – cello
- Richard Kennedy – French horn
- Colin Clague – trumpet

=== Production ===
- Benedict Tobias Fenner – engineer
- Roger King – engineer, mastering, mixing, orchestral arrangements
- Jerry Peal – engineer, contribution
- Harry Pearce – design
- Kim Poor – cover painting
