= To Watch the Storms =

Studio album by Steve Hackett
- Released: 9 June 2003
- Recorded: 2003
- Genres: Progressive rock, art rock
- Length: 58:16
- Labels: Camino Records (UK), InsideOut Music (US)
- Producer: Steve Hackett

Steve Hackett chronology
Genesis Files (2002)	To Watch the Storms (2003)	Metamorpheus (2005)

Professional ratings
Review scores
Source	Rating
Allmusic	3.5/5 stars

To Watch the Storms is the 16th studio album by Steve Hackett. It was recorded with his then-touring band, including his brother John and producer and keyboardist Roger King. The album was released in three formats, including a standard and special edition; the cover artwork was by Kim Poor. There was also a Japanese edition with an extra track not included on the UK releases, as well as alternate cover art also by Kim Poor.

== Track listing ==
All songs written by Steve Hackett except where indicated.

=== Standard Edition (CAMCD31) ===
1. "Strutton Ground"
2. "Circus of Becoming"
3. "The Devil Is an Englishman" (Thomas Dolby)
4. "Frozen Statues" (Hackett, Roger King)
5. "Mechanical Bride"
6. "Wind, Sand and Stars"
7. "Brand New" (Hackett, King)
8. "This World" (Hackett, Kim Poor)
9. "Rebecca"
10. "The Silk Road" (Hackett, King)
11. "Come Away"
12. "The Moon Under Water"
13. "Serpentine Song"

=== Special Edition (CAMCD31SE) ===
Includes four bonus tracks, a 40-page booklet with extended sleeve notes from Steve and original Kim Poor artwork for each track. Packaged in slipcase.

1. "Strutton Ground"
2. "Circus of Becoming"
3. "The Devil Is an Englishman" (Thomas Dolby)
4. "Frozen Statues" (Hackett, King)
5. "Mechanical Bride"
6. "Wind, Sand and Stars"
7. "Brand New" (Hackett, King)
8. "This World" (Hackett, Poor)
9. "Rebecca"
10. "The Silk Road" (Hackett, King)
11. "Pollution B"
12. "Fire Island"
13. "Marijuana Assassin of Youth"
14. "Come Away"
15. "The Moon Under Water"
16. "Serpentine Song"
17. "If You Only Knew"

=== Japanese Edition (UICE1064) ===
Includes four bonus tracks and an obi strip. Packaged in a slipcase.

1. "Strutton Ground"
2. "Brand New" (Hackett, King)
3. "This World" (Hackett, Poor)
4. "Circus of Becoming"
5. "The Devil Is an Englishman" (Thomas Dolby)
6. "Frozen Statues" (Hackett, King)
7. "Mechanical Bride"
8. "Wind, Sand and Stars"
9. "Rebecca"
10. "The Silk Road" (Hackett, King)
11. "Come Away"
12. "The Moon Under Water"
13. "Serpentine Song"
14. "Flame"
15. "Pollution B"
16. "Fire Island"
17. "If You Only Knew"

=== Digital Downloads ===
1. Brand New (edit) (Hackett, King)

== Personnel ==
- Steve Hackett – Vocals, Guitar
- Roger King – Keyboards
- Rob Townsend – Brass, Woodwind
- Terry Gregory – Bass, Vocals
- Gary O'Toole – Drums, Vocals
- John Hackett – Flute on "Serpentine Song"
- Ian McDonald – Saxophone on "Brand New"
- Jeanne Downs – Backing Vocals
- Sarah Wilson – Cello
- Howard Gott – Violin
