= Bay of Kings =

Studio album by Steve Hackett
- Released: 28 October 1983
- Recorded: 1980–1983
- Genre: Contemporary classical
- Length: 36:50 (original) / 44:26 (reissue)
- Label: Lamborghini Records (UK & Europe); Chrysalis (US, Canada & Japan)
- Producer: John Acock and Steve Hackett

Steve Hackett chronology
Highly Strung (1983)	Bay of Kings (1983)	Till We Have Faces (1984)

Original cover

Japanese LP cover

Professional ratings
Review scores
Source	Rating
AllMusic	4/5 stars

Bay of Kings is the seventh studio album from English guitarist Steve Hackett, released in October 1983 on Lamborghini Records. His first album consisting entirely of instrumental classical guitar music, Hackett's former record company Charisma Records refused to release it over concerns about its commercial viability. Hackett left the label and released Bay of Kings through independent record company Lamborghini Records, started by Patric Mimran who owned the said car company at that time. It was later reissued by Hackett's own label, Camino Records. The album cover originally used a nude painting by his wife at the time, Kim Poor, but at her insistence it was replaced for the Camino reissue by a new painting of Hackett. (The original Japanese issue of the album replaced the nude cover with one that featured a drawing of a guitar.)

== Track listing ==
1. "Bay of Kings" – 4:57
2. "The Journey" – 4:15
3. "Kim" – 2:25
4. "Marigold" – 3:37
5. "St. Elmo's Fire" – 3:08
6. "Petropolis" – 2:46
7. "Second Chance" – 1:59
8. "Cast Adrift" – 2:15
9. "Horizons" – 1:47
10. "Black Light" – 2:32
11. "The Barren Land" – 3:46
12. "Calmaria" – 3:23
13. "Time Lapse at Milton Keynes" – 3:57 (reissue bonus track)
14. "Tales of the Riverbank" (traditional) – 2:02 (reissue bonus track)
15. "Skye Boat Song" (traditional) – 1:37 (reissue bonus track)

== Musicians ==
- Steve Hackett – guitar, keyboards
- Nick Magnus – synthesizer, keyboards
- John Hackett – flute, keyboards

== Charts ==
Chart (1983)	Peak position
UK Albums (OCC)	70
