= Under a Mediterranean Sky =

Studio album by Steve Hackett
- Released: 22 January 2021
- Genre: Instrumental contemporary classical, Instrumental new flamenco
- Length: 51:15
- Label: Inside Out Music; Wolfwork
- Producer: Steve Hackett; Roger King

Steve Hackett chronology
Selling England by the Pound & Spectral Mornings: Live at Hammersmith (2020)	Under a Mediterranean Sky (2021)	Surrender of Silence (2021)

Under a Mediterranean Sky is the 26th studio album by English guitarist and songwriter Steve Hackett. It was released on 22 January 2021 on Inside Out Music and is his first acoustic and entirely instrumental album since Tribute (2008).

== Background ==
Under a Mediterranean Sky is Hackett's first acoustic album since Tribute (2008), which saw him pay homage to various composers. The album originated in March 2020, when his North American tour was cut short due to the COVID-19 pandemic, which saw him return to England without his electric guitars. The situation left Hackett at home with just his acoustic instruments, including his nylon guitar, and the opportunity to work on a new acoustic project. Hackett had discussions with his label, Inside Out Music, regarding if his next studio album can be acoustic or rock-oriented, and both ideas were green-lit, so he thought the time was right to do an acoustic album. Around this time, Hackett and his longtime producer and keyboardist Roger King decided to upgrade their software and purchase new orchestral samples. A series of videos were shot while Hackett and his wife Jo were visiting the places depicted on the album, including footage from Jo herself and from Paul Gosling.

== Release ==
Professional ratings
Review scores
Source	Rating
Prog Radio	3/5 stars

The album was released on 22 January 2021. It is available in a limited edition CD digipak, a 2 LP and single CD set with a booklet, and on digital platforms.

== Track listing ==
No.	Title	Writer(s)	Length
1.	"Mdina (The Walled City)"	Steve Hackett; Roger King	8:45
2.	"Adriatic Blue"	S. Hackett	4:51
3.	"Sirocco"	S. Hackett; Jo Hackett; King	5:13
4.	"Joie de Vivre"	S. Hackett; J. Hackett	3:42
5.	"The Memory of Myth"	S. Hackett; J. Hackett; King	3:29
6.	"Scarlatti Sonata" (Sonata in C Minor, K. 11, L. 351)	Domenico Scarlatti	3:40
7.	"Casa del Fauno"	S. Hackett; King	3:51
8.	"The Dervish and The Djin"	S. Hackett; J. Hackett; King	4:57
9.	"Lorato"	S. Hackett	2:29
10.	"Andalusian Heart"	S. Hackett; J. Hackett; King	5:34
11.	"The Call of the Sea"	S. Hackett	4:44
Total length:			51:15

== Personnel ==
Music

- Steve Hackett – nylon guitar, steel guitar, 12-string guitar, charango, Iraqi oud
- Roger King – keyboards, programming, orchestral arrangements
- John Hackett – flute on "Casa del Fauno"
- Rob Townsend – flute on "Casa del Fauno", soprano saxophone on "The Dervish and The Djin"
- Franck Avril – oboe on "Andalusian Heart"
- Malik Mansurov – tar on "Sirocco" and "The Dervish and The Djin"
- Arsen Petrosyan – duduk on "The Dervish and The Djin"
- Christine Townsend – violin and viola on "The Memory of Myth" and "Andalusian Heart"

Production

- Steve Hackett – production
- Roger King – production, mixing at Siren

== Charts ==
Chart performance for Under a Mediterranean Sky
Chart (2021)	Peak position
Belgian Albums (Ultratop Wallonia)	89
German Albums (Offizielle Top 100)	14
Scottish Albums (OCC)	9
Swiss Albums (Schweizer Hitparade)	20
UK Albums (OCC)	52
