= Wolflight =

Studio album by Steve Hackett
- Released: 30 March 2015
- Recorded: 2012–2014
- Studio: Various
- Genre: Progressive rock, progressive metal
- Length: 55:31
- Label: Inside Out Music
- Producer: Steve Hackett and Roger King

Steve Hackett chronology
Genesis Revisited: Live at the Royal Albert Hall (2014)	Wolflight (2015)	The Total Experience Live In Liverpool (2016)

Wolflight is the 23rd studio album by musician Steve Hackett. The album debuted at no. 31 in the UK album chart.

== Track listing ==
All tracks by Steve Hackett, with additional writers noted.

=== CD edition ===
1. "Out of the Body"
2. "Wolflight" (Jo Hackett)
3. "Love Song to a Vampire"
4. "The Wheel's Turning" (J. Hackett, Roger King)
5. "Corycian Fire" (J. Hackett, King)
6. "Earthshine"
7. "Loving Sea" (J. Hackett)
8. "Black Thunder" (J. Hackett)
9. "Dust and Dreams" (King)
10. "Heart Song"

=== Vinyl edition ===
The vinyl edition also included a 12-track CD of the album ("Pneuma", "Midnight Sun" and "Caress" are absent from the CD version).

Side 1

1. "Out of the Body"
2. "Wolflight" (Jo Hackett)
3. "Love Song to a Vampire"

Side 2

1. "The Wheel's Turning" (Jo Hackett, Roger King)
2. "Corycian Fire" (J. Hackett, King)
3. "Earthshine"
4. "Loving Sea" (J. Hackett)

Side 3

1. "Black Thunder" (J. Hackett)
2. "Dust and Dreams" (Roger King)
3. "Heart Song"

Side 4

1. "Pneuma"
2. "Midnight Sun"
3. "Caress"

=== CD/Blu-ray edition ===
This edition of the album contains a Blu-ray disk with a 5.1 surround sound version of the album. "Caress" is missing from both the CD and Blu-ray on this edition.

1. "Out of the Body"
2. "Wolflight" (J. Hackett)
3. "Love Song to a Vampire"
4. "The Wheel's Turning" (J. Hackett, Roger King)
5. "Corycian Fire" (J. Hackett, King)
6. "Earthshine"
7. "Loving Sea" (J. Hackett)
8. "Black Thunder" (J. Hackett)
9. "Dust and Dreams" (King)
10. "Heart Song"
11. "Pneuma"
12. "Midnight Sun"

== Personnel ==
- Steve Hackett – electric and acoustic guitars (all tracks), banjo (8), oud (5, 9), tiple (7), harmonica (4, 8), percussion (1, 4, 7), lead, harmony and backing vocals (2–5, 7, 8, 10)
- Roger King – keyboards (all tracks), programming (all tracks)
- Nick Beggs – bass (all tracks except 3), Chapman Stick (8)
- Chris Squire – bass (3)
- Gary O'Toole – drums (1–5, 8)
- Hugo Degenhardt – drums (9, 10)
- Rob Townsend – saxophone (4, 8), duduk (5)
- Christine Townsend – violin (1–4, 8), viola (1–4, 8)
- Amanda Lehmann – vocals (2–4, 8)
- Jo Hackett – vocals (4)
- Malik Mansurov – tar (2)
- Sara Kovács – didgeridoo (2)

Technical

- Produced by Hackett/King
- Recorded, mixed and mastered by King
- Mansurov & Kovács recorded by Tamas Barabas
- Design by Harry Pearce
- Photographic artwork by Maurizio and Angéla Vicedomini

== Reception ==
Despite enjoying only moderate chart success internationally, the album was highly rated by www.ultimateclassicrock.com, which included Wolflight in its shortlist of the Best Classic Albums of 2015 (so far), on 4 July 2015.

It said Hackett had used a variety of musical genres and added: "He boldly breaks free of the historical constrictions surrounding the Genesis Revisited projects, even as he recalls the striking instrumental turns that defined his early legacy."

== Charts ==
Chart (2015)	Peak position
Belgian Albums (Ultratop Flanders)	154
Belgian Albums (Ultratop Wallonia)	74
Dutch Albums (Album Top 100)	49
French Albums (SNEP)	128
German Albums (Offizielle Top 100)	49
Italian Albums (FIMI)	67
Scottish Albums (OCC)	35
Swiss Albums (Schweizer Hitparade)	58
UK Albums (OCC)	31
