= Wild Orchids (album) =

Studio album by Steve Hackett
- Released: 11 September 2006
- Recorded: 2006
- Genre: Progressive rock
- Label: Camino Records (UK)
- Producer: Steve Hackett

Steve Hackett chronology
Metamorpheus (2005)	Wild Orchids (2006)	Tribute (2008)

Professional ratings
Review scores
Source	Rating
Allmusic	3.5/5 stars

Wild Orchids is the 18th studio album by Steve Hackett, released in 2006. It follows on from the success of the previous studio outings To Watch the Storms in 2003 and Metamorpheus in 2005. The album is released in three formats including a standard and special editions. There is also a Japanese edition with two extra tracks not included on the UK releases.

== Track listing ==
All songs written by Steve Hackett; except "Transylvanian Express" and "A Dark Night in Toytown" by Hackett, King, Glück; "Waters of the Wild" and "Down Street" by Hackett, King; "Set Your Compass" by S.Hackett, John Hackett; "Ego & Id" by J.Hackett, N.Clabburn; "Man in the Long Black Coat" by Bob Dylan

1. "A Dark Night in Toytown"
2. "Waters of the Wild"
3. "Set Your Compass"
4. "Down Street"
5. "A Girl Called Linda"
6. "To a Close"
7. "Ego & Id"
8. "Man in the Long Black Coat"
9. "Wolfwork"
10. "Why"
11. "She Moves in Memories"
12. "The Fundamentals of Brainwashing"
13. "Howl"
- Special Edition (CAMCD38SE) – includes four extra tracks and packaged in slipcase.
1. "Transylvanian Express" – 3:44
2. "Waters of the Wild" – 5:35
3. "Set Your Compass" – 3:38
4. "Down Street" – 7:34
5. "A Girl Called Linda" – 4:44
6. "Blue Child" – 4:25
7. "To a Close" – 4:49
8. "Ego & Id" – 4:08
9. "Man in the Long Black Coat" – 5:07
10. "Cedars of Lebanon" – 4:02
11. "Wolfwork" – 4:49
12. "Why" – 0:47
13. "She Moves in Memories" – 5:00
14. "The Fundamentals of Brainwashing" – 3:01
15. "Howl" – 4:31
16. "A Dark Night in Toytown" – 3:42
17. "Until the Last Butterfly" – 2:29
- Japanese Edition (IECP-10066) – includes 2 new extra tracks, obi strip and packaged in slipcase.
1. "Transylvanian Express"
2. "Waters of the Wild"
3. "Set Your Compass"
4. "Down Street"
5. "A Girl Called Linda"
6. "To a Close"
7. "Ego & Id"
8. "Man in the Long Black Coat"
9. "Cedars of Lebanon"
10. "Wolfwork"
11. "Why"
12. "She Moves in Memories"
13. "The Fundamentals of Brainwashing"
14. "Howl"
15. "A Dark Night in Toytown"
16. Eruption
17. Reconditioned Nightmare
- Digital Downloads
1. "Man in the Long Black Coat" (edit)
2. "The Fundamentals of Brainwashing" (edit)

== Personnel ==
- Steve Hackett – guitars, electric sitar, harmonica, psaltery, optigan and voices
- Roger King – keyboards and programming, and rhythm guitar on "Down Street".
- John Hackett – principal flute on "To A Close", "She Moves in Memories", "Cedars of Lebanon" and riff guitar on "Ego & Id"
- Rob Townsend – saxes, principal flute on "Linda", alto flute on "She Moves in Memories", tin whistle and bass clarinet.
- Gary O'Toole – drums and harmony voices.
- Nick Magnus – keyboards on "Ego & Id".
- The Underworld Orchestra:
- Christine Townsend – principal violin, viola
- Richard Stewart – cello
- Dick Driver – double bass
- Colin Clague – trumpet
- Chris Redgate – oboe, cor anglais
