= At the Edge of Light =

Studio album by Steve Hackett
- Released: 25 January 2019
- Recorded: 2018
- Studio: The Hacketts' home, Siren, Paddock, Paradise Studio, Grammy Studio, Sweetwater
- Genre: Progressive rock
- Length: 54:27
- Label: Wolfwork/InsideOut
- Producer: Steve Hackett; Roger King; Benedict Fenner

Steve Hackett chronology
Wuthering Nights: Live in Birmingham (2018)	At the Edge of Light (2019)	Genesis Revisited Band & Orchestra: Live at the Royal Festival Hall (2019)

Singles from At the Edge of Light
- 1. "Under the Eye of the Sun" Released: 30 November 2018; 2. "Underground Railroad" Released: 21 December 2018

At the Edge of Light is the twenty-fifth studio album by British musician Steve Hackett, released on 25 January 2019 by InsideOut Records.

== Release ==
The album was announced on 25 October 2018. Available formats include CD, a two LP and CD set, a digital download, and as a CD and DVD digipak mediabook with a 5.1 surround sound mix and a behind the scenes documentary.

On 30 November 2018, "Under the Eye of the Sun" was released as the first single off the album.

== Track listing ==
All tracks are written by Steve Hackett, with additional writers noted.

No.	Title	Writer(s)	Length
1.	"Fallen Walls and Pedestals"	Roger King	2:17
2.	"Beasts in Our Time"	Jo Hackett, King	6:20
3.	"Under the Eye of the Sun"	J. Hackett	7:06
4.	"Underground Railroad"	J. Hackett, King	6:22
5.	"Those Golden Wings"	J. Hackett, King	11:09
6.	"Shadow and Flame"	J. Hackett	4:22
7.	"Hungry Years"		4:34
8.	"Descent"		4:20
9.	"Conflict"	King	2:36
10.	"Peace"	J. Hackett	5:03

Japanese edition bonus tracks
No.	Title	Writer(s)	Length
11.	"Teach Yourself Valcan"
12.	"Roulette"	Benedict Fenner

== Personnel ==
Music

- Steve Hackett – electric & acoustic guitars, 12 string guitar, dobro, bass guitar, harmonica, vocals
- Durga McBroom – vocals on "Underground Railroad"
- Lorelei McBroom – vocals on "Underground Railroad"
- Nick D'Virgilio – drums on "Those Golden Wings"
- Simon Phillips – drums on "Hungry Years"
- Sheema Mukherjee – sitar on "Shadow and Flame"
- Malik Mansurov – tar on "Fallen Walls and Pedestals"
- Jonas Reingold – bass guitar on "Beasts in Our Time", "Under the Eye of the Sun" and "Hungry Years"
- Paul Stillwell – didgeridoo on "Under the Eye of the Sun"
- Gulli Briem – drums, percussion on "Under the Eye of the Sun"
- Rob Townsend – tenor saxophone, flute, duduk, bass clarinet on "Beasts in Our Time" and "Under the Eye of the Sun"
- Amanda Lehmann – vocals on "Under the Eye of the Sun", "Underground Railroad", "Those Golden Wings", "Hungry Years" and "Peace"
- John Hackett – flute on "Beasts in Our Time", "Under the Eye of the Sun", "Those Golden Wings" and "Conflict"
- Gary O'Toole – drums on "Fallen Walls and Pedestals"
- Roger King – keyboards, programming, orchestral arrangements (except on "Descent")
- Benedict Fenner – keyboards, programming on "Hungry Years" and "Descent"
- Dick Driver – double bass on "Under the Eye of the Sun" and "Hungry Years"
- Christine Townsend – violin, viola on "Those Golden Wings"

Production

- Steve Hackett - production
- Roger King – production, engineering (except on "Descent")
- Benedict Fenner – production, engineering on "Descent"

== Charts ==
Chart (2019)	Peak position
Belgian Albums (Ultratop Flanders)	129
Belgian Albums (Ultratop Wallonia)	71
Dutch Albums (Album Top 100)	72
French Albums (SNEP)	151
German Albums (Offizielle Top 100)	13
Italian Albums (FIMI)	75
Polish Albums (ZPAV)	41
Scottish Albums (OCC)	12
Spanish Albums (PROMUSICAE)	55
Swiss Albums (Schweizer Hitparade)	21
UK Albums (OCC)	28
UK Rock & Metal Albums (OCC)	3
