= Voyage of the Acolyte =

Studio album by Steve Hackett
- Released: October 1975
- Recorded: June–July 1975
- Studio: Kingsway Recorders, Kingsway, London
- Genre: Progressive rock
- Length: 40:52
- Label: Charisma (UK, Europe and Japan); Chrysalis (US)
- Producer: Steve Hackett; John Acock

Steve Hackett chronology
Voyage of the Acolyte (1975)	Please Don't Touch! (1978)

Professional ratings
Review scores
Source	Rating
AllMusic	4/5 stars

Voyage of the Acolyte is the first studio album by English guitarist, songwriter, and singer Steve Hackett, released in October 1975 on Charisma Records as his only album recorded and released while he was a member of Genesis. Hackett recorded the album during a break in group activity in mid-1975 and used guest musicians, including Genesis bassist Mike Rutherford and drummer/vocalist Phil Collins, to play on the record. It has a loose concept with the title and lyrics of each track inspired by a Tarot card.

Voyage of the Acolyte reached No. 26 in the UK and No. 191 in the US. It was reissued in 2005 with bonus tracks. A surround upmix of the album is included in Premonitions: The Charisma Recordings 1975–1983 (2015).

== Background and writing ==
By 1975, Hackett had been the guitarist in the progressive rock band Genesis for four years. He began to write sections of different songs while recording albums with Genesis, specifically at moments when his "services weren't really called upon, and I found I had a lot of spare time". By this time, Hackett had become increasingly frustrated with the band's packed touring schedule, which had affected his creativity, and he had a growing desire to work with a new set of musicians. He had written pieces without any specific project in mind, including those for instruments other than the guitar and another for a female vocalist, but after a time he had assembled enough ideas to form an album. Development was put on hold in late 1974 due to Genesis touring commitments with their album The Lamb Lies Down on Broadway (1974), but Hackett remained productive and continued to write in his hotel room each night which kept him "sane" and helped calm his stage nerves.

When it came to the direction of the album, Hackett thought of a loose concept from his new-found interest in Tarot cards, which he used to title the album's tracks, and their lyrics, based on various cards in a deck. He took the cards that had conjured the strongest feeling and "mapped out a way of working", such as having "Star of Sirius" a "poppy" track to reflect the optimism that the corresponding Tarot card depicts. A track left off the album, "The Fool", had Hackett play in a style similar to that of Pete Townshend to a song that was like "ELO meets The Who", but he chose not to use it. Some of Hackett's material originated from his pre-Genesis days. Genesis bandmate Mike Rutherford wrote the ending of "Shadow of the Hierophant" as a potential song for Foxtrot, and it was rehearsed by Genesis, but ultimately left off the album. Voyage of the Acolyte marked the first collaboration with his brother John on an album, which has continued through Steve Hackett's solo career. John Hackett is credited for co-writing the song "A Tower Struck Down" and claims he also wrote the chord pattern immediately preceding the middle section of "Ace of Wands". The album also signified Hackett's first attempts at playing keyboards, and aimed for an album that had a more layered sound.

The album's original title was Premonitions, but management at Charisma disliked it and suggested Voyage of the Acolyte, to which Hackett agreed.

== Recording ==
Hackett recorded Voyage of the Acolyte in June and July 1975, starting one month after Genesis had finished touring their double concept album, The Lamb Lies Down on Broadway. Recording was completed in four weeks at Kingsway Recorders, then located in Kingsway, central London.

The album's cover is a Chinese watercolour painting by Brazilian artist Kim Poor, whom Hackett later married and who produced many of his subsequent album covers. Hackett dedicated Voyage of the Acolyte to Poor. They divorced in 2007.

== Track listing ==
All songs written by Steve Hackett, except where noted.

Side one
No.	Title	Writer(s)	Length
1.	"Ace of Wands"		5:23
2.	"Hands of the Priestess, Part I"		3:28
3.	"A Tower Struck Down"	Steve and John Hackett	4:53
4.	"Hands of the Priestess, Part II"		1:31
5.	"The Hermit"		4:49

Side two
No.	Title	Writer(s)	Length
6.	"Star of Sirius"		7:08
7.	"The Lovers"		1:50
8.	"Shadow of the Hierophant"	S. Hackett, Mike Rutherford	11:44

Bonus tracks
No.	Title	Writer(s)	Length
9.	"Ace of Wands" (Live)		6:32
10.	"Shadow of the Hierophant" (Extended Playout Version)	S. Hackett, Rutherford	17:01

== Personnel ==
Credits are adapted from the album's original liner notes.

Musicians

- Steve Hackett – acoustic & electric guitar, Mellotron, harmonium, autoharp, bells, effects, vocals (5)
- John Acock – acoustic piano, Elka Rhapsody synthesizer, Mellotron, harmonium
- John Hackett – ARP synthesizer, bells, flute
- Mike Rutherford – fuzz 12-string guitar, bass guitar, bass pedals
- Johnny Gustafson – bass guitar (6)
- Percy Jones – additional bass guitar (3)
- Phil Collins – drums, percussion, vibraphone, vocals (6)
- Robin Miller – oboe (4, 5), English horn (6)
- Nigel Warren-Green – cello (5)
- Sally Oldfield – vocals (8)

Production

- Steve Hackett – producer, arrangements
- John Acock – producer, engineer
- Rob Broglia – assistant engineer
- Paul Watkins – assistant engineer
- Louie Austin – assistant engineer (8)
- Tex Read – equipment
- Geoff Banks – equipment
- Steve Baker – equipment
- Tony Smith – organization
- Alex Sim – organization
- Kim Poor – cover artwork
- Philip Lloyd-Smee – CD design
- Barry Plummer – photography

== Charts ==
Chart (1975)	Peak position
UK Albums (OCC)	26
US Billboard 200	191
