= The Tokyo Tapes =

Live album by Steve Hackett
- Released: 27 April 1998
- Recorded: 16 and 17 December 1996
- Venues: Koseinenkin Hall, Tokyo, Japan
- Genre: Progressive rock
- Label: Camino Records
- Producer: Steve Hackett

Steve Hackett chronology
A Midsummer Night's Dream (1997)	The Tokyo Tapes (1998)	Dark Town (1999)

Professional ratings
Review scores
Source	Rating
AllMusic	3.5/5 stars

The Tokyo Tapes is a live and studio album by English guitarist Steve Hackett, released in April 1998 by Camino Records. It documents two concerts performed by a supergroup line-up of Hackett, John Wetton, Chester Thompson, Ian McDonald and Julian Colbeck, in Tokyo, Japan in December 1996. The album includes two studio tracks recorded by Hackett. In 2001, a DVD of the concerts was released, with the same title.

== Background ==
The DVD contains 18 minutes of bonus rehearsal footage and band biographies.

Both the CD and the DVD were promoted with the tagline: "What would it sound like if occasional members of GENESIS, KING CRIMSON, ASIA, YES, ZAPPA & WEATHER REPORT all got together to form a unique team just for one night?"

A Triple-LP package pressed on white vinyl was released for Record Store Day on June 18, 2022

== Track listing ==
Original artists for live songs are listed in brackets.

Disc 1

1. "Watcher of the Skies" (Banks, Rutherford, Hackett, Gabriel, Collins) – 8:59 [Genesis]
2. "Riding the Colossus" (Hackett) – 3:32 [Solo Steve Hackett]
3. "Firth of Fifth" (Banks, Collins, Hackett, Rutherford, Gabriel) – 9:32 [Genesis]
4. "Battlelines" (Wetton, Marlette, Mitchell) – 6:43 [Solo John Wetton]
5. "Camino Royale" (Hackett, Magnus) – 9:06 [Solo Steve Hackett]
6. "The Court of the Crimson King" (McDonald, Sinfield) – 7:39 [King Crimson]
7. "Horizons" (Hackett) – 1:53 [Genesis/Solo Steve Hackett]
8. "Walking Away from Rainbows" (Hackett) – 3:47 [Solo Steve Hackett]
9. "Heat of the Moment" (Wetton, Downes) – 4:06 [Asia]

Disc 2

1. "...In That Quiet Earth'" (Hackett, Rutherford, Banks, Collins) – 4:02 [Genesis]
2. "Vampyre With a Healthy Appetite" (Hackett) – 7:23 [Solo Steve Hackett]
3. "I Talk to the Wind" (McDonald, Sinfield) – 5:37 [King Crimson]
4. "Shadow of the Hierophant" (Hackett, Rutherford) – 7:14 [Solo Steve Hackett]
5. "Los Endos" (Banks, Collins, Rutherford, Hackett) – 6:54 [Genesis]
6. "Black Light" (Hackett) – 2:30 [Solo Steve Hackett]
7. "The Steppes" (Hackett) – 6:48 [Solo Steve Hackett]
8. "I Know What I Like" (Hackett, Banks, Rutherford, Collins, Gabriel) – 5:51 [Genesis]
9. "Firewall" (Hackett) [Studio Track] – 4:41
10. "The Dealer" (Hackett) [Studio track] – 4:23
11. "Los Endos" (Hackett) ['Revisited' Studio Version] 8:52

== RSD 2022 Track listing ==
Original artists for live songs are listed in brackets.

LP 1, Side 1

1. "Watcher of the Skies" (Banks, Rutherford, Hackett, Gabriel, Collins) – 8:59 [Genesis]
2. "Riding the Colossus" (Hackett) – 3:32 [Solo Steve Hackett]
3. "Firth of Fifth" (Banks, Collins, Hackett, Rutherford, Gabriel) – 9:32 [Genesis]

LP 1, Side 2

1. "Battlelines" (Wetton, Marlette, Mitchell) – 6:43 [Solo John Wetton]
2. "Camino Royale" (Hackett, Magnus) – 9:06 [Solo Steve Hackett]
3. "The Court of the Crimson King" (McDonald, Sinfield) – 7:39 [King Crimson]

LP 2, Side 3

1. "Horizons" (Hackett) – 1:53 [Genesis/Solo Steve Hackett]
2. "Walking Away from Rainbows" (Hackett) – 3:47 [Solo Steve Hackett]
3. "Heat of the Moment" (Wetton, Downes) – 4:06 [Asia]
4. "...In That Quiet Earth'" (Hackett, Rutherford, Banks, Collins) – 4:02 [Genesis]
5. "Vampyre With a Healthy Appetite" (Hackett) – 7:23 [Solo Steve Hackett]

LP 2, Side 4

1. "I Talk to the Wind" (McDonald, Sinfield) – 5:37 [King Crimson]
2. "Shadow of the Hierophant" (Hackett, Rutherford) – 7:14 [Solo Steve Hackett]
3. "Los Endos" (Banks, Collins, Rutherford, Hackett) – 6:54 [Genesis]

LP 3, Side 5

1. "Black Light" (Hackett) – 2:30 [Solo Steve Hackett]
2. "The Steppes" (Hackett) – 6:48 [Solo Steve Hackett]
3. "I Know What I Like" (Hackett, Banks, Rutherford, Collins, Gabriel) – 5:51 [Genesis]

LP 3, Side 6

1. "Firewall" (Hackett) [Studio Track] – 4:41
2. "The Dealer" (Hackett) [Studio Track] – 4:23
3. "All Along The Watchtower" (Dylan) [Studio Track: Hackett, Wetton] 8:52

== Credits (live tracks) ==
- Steve Hackett – guitar, harmonica, vocals
- Ian McDonald – flute, saxophone, guitar, keyboards, vocals
- Julian Colbeck – keyboards, vocals
- John Wetton – vocals, bass, guitar
- Chester Thompson – drums

== Credits (studio tracks) ==
- Steve Hackett – guitar, percussion
- Aron Friedman – keyboards, programming

== Charts ==
Chart (1998)	Peak position
UK Independent Albums (Official Charts)	18

Chart (2022)	Peak position
UK Independent Albums (Official Charts)	42
UK Rock & Metal Albums (Official Charts)	19
