= Kim Poor =

Brazilian artist

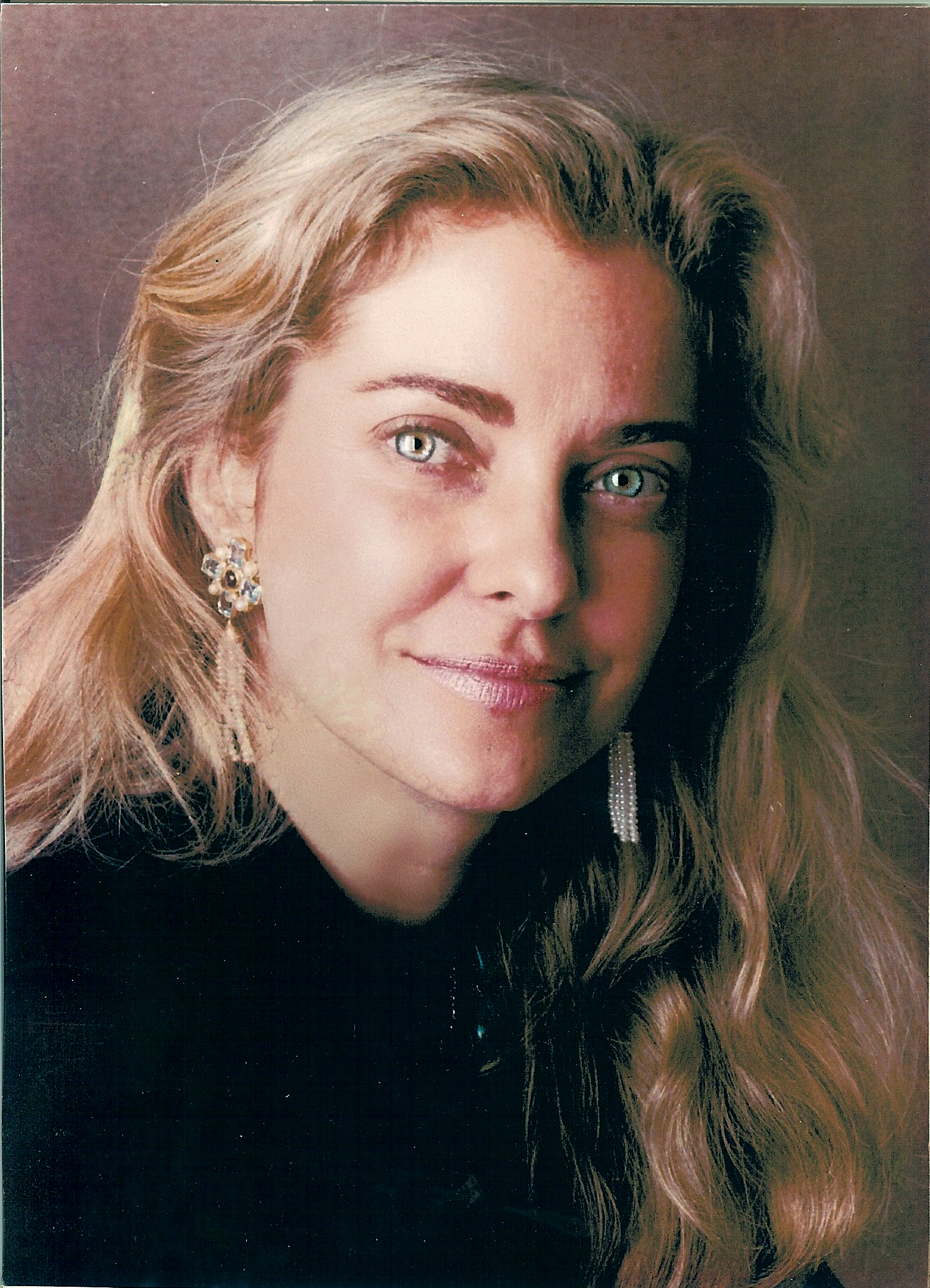
- Education: Parsons School of Design; Skidmore College; Central School of Art and Design
- Known for: Fine Art; Jewellery Design
- Movement: Diaphanism
- Website: www.kimpoor.com

Kim Poor is a Brazilian artist.

== Biography ==
Born in Brazil, Kim Poor first exhibited at the age of 12. At 17 she left Brazil to study Fine Arts at the Parsons School of Design in New York City with Larry Rivers and at Skidmore College in upstate New York where she developed a new technique in painting with ground glass on steel. In 1982, she enrolled at the Central School of Art and Design in London to pursue her interests in printmaking with Norman Ackroyd R.A.

Her style and technique of painting uses powdered glass fused on steel and is known as “Diaphanism”.

When writing about Poor's 1997 work "What the Jaguar Saw", art critic Edward Lucie-Smith said; "Jaguars play a major role in the mythology of the Amazonian Indians. The Brazilian artist Kim Poor, working with a demanding technique in which tiny specks of pure pigment are fused onto a metal surface, here gives the beast a godlike presence." With further reference to the technique, this time in relation to Poor's 1997 work "Macaw and the Moon", he comments, "This is a painting in enamel on metal. The technique the artist uses seems wonderfully well-suited to the mystical atmosphere she wants to evoke. Because it allows her to create both the intense colors of the bird in the foreground, and the ethereal quality of the figure symbolizing the moon in the background."

In 1981, Poor married the British musician Steve Hackett. She created numerous artworks for his music releases. They divorced in 2007, which led Poor to file a legal case against Hackett, claiming she was a joint owner of Stephen Hackett Ltd., which was where all future royalties from Genesis songs he had written and performed were paid into. In 2006, Hackett arranged for all royalties to be paid directly to him rather than the company, which Poor argued was in breach of their agreement; she claimed that she was entitled to a share of the money. Poor also challenged Hackett's right to make new albums independently, causing further issues. The case was settled in 2010.
