= List of double albums =

A double album is a collection of two LP records or Compact Discs bought as a single unit. This allows a performance longer than the standard running time of the medium to be presented as a single package.

Until the mid-1960s, double albums were rare and not considered significant. The first popular example was Bob Dylan's Blonde on Blonde, released in 1966, soon followed by The Mothers of Invention's debut album Freak Out!. The Beatles' White Album, released in 1968, showed a wide variety of musical styles that the group thought would be difficult to cram onto a single LP.

Contents

Top – 0–9 and punctuation A B C D E F G H I J K L M N O P Q R S T U V W X Y Z

See also

== 0–9 and punctuation ==
- μ-ziq – Bluff Limbo (1994) – 2×CD – studio
- The 1975 – The 1975 (2013) – 2×LP – studio
- 4hero – Two Pages – 2×CD – studio

== A ==
- Above This – Alloquy & Terrene (2015) – 2×LP – studio
- Acid Mothers Temple & the Melting Paraiso U.F.O. – Do Whatever You Want, Don't Do Whatever You Don't!! (2002) – 2×CD compilation
- Aera – Mechelwind (2009)
- Ryan Adams and The Cardinals – Cold Roses (2005) – 2×CD – studio
- Afroman – Afroholic... The Even Better Times (2004) – 2×CD – studio
- Christina Aguilera – Back to Basics (2006) – 2×CD – studio
- Air Liquide – The Increased Difficulty of Concentration (1994) – 2×CD – studio
- Jason Aldean – Macon, Georgia (2021/2022) – 2×CD – studio
- The Allman Brothers Band – At Fillmore East (1971) – 2×LP – live
- Bernard Allison – Live at the Jazzhaus (2011)
- The Allman Brothers Band – Eat a Peach (1972) – 2×LP, 1×CD – live/studio
- The Allman Brothers Band – Beginnings (1973) – 2×LP, 1×CD – compilation
- The Allman Brothers Band – Wipe The Windows, Check The Oil, Dollar Gas (1976) – 2×LP – live
- The Allman Brothers Band – The Fillmore Concerts (1992)
- Almunia – Pulsar (2013) – 2×LP – studio
- Alquin – 3 Originals (1999) – 2×CD reissue
- Alquin – The Marks sessions: Expanded edition (2013) – 2×CD – reissue
- Amanaz – Africa (1975; 2015) – 2×LP; 2×CD w/ reverb mix reissue
- America – Here & Now (2007)
- Amon Düül I – Disaster – Lüüd Noma (1973) – 2×LP – studio
- Amon Düül II – Yeti (1970) – 2×LP – studio
- Amon Düül II – Tanz der Lemminge (1971) – 2×LP – studio
- Amon Düül II – Made in Germany (1975) – 2×LP – studio
- Tori Amos – To Venus and Back (1999) – 2×CD – studio/live
- Ancient Desert Ritual – Notch (2014) – 2×CD – studio/conceptual
- Laurie Anderson, John Giorno, William S. Burroughs – You're the Guy I Want To Share My Money With (1981) – 2×LP – studio
- Ange – Rêves Parties (2001) – 2×CD reissue
- Ange – Escale À Ch'tiland (2012) + bonus DVD
- The Animals – Love Is (1968) – 2×LP – studio
- Aphex Twin – Selected Ambient Works Vol. 2 (1994) – 3×LP, 2×CD – studio
- Aphex Twin – Drukqs (2001) – 4×LP, 2×CD – studio
- Aphrodite's Child – 666 (The Apocalypse Of John,13/18) (1972) – 2×LP, 1×CD – studio
- Apollo 440 – Dude Descending a Staircase (2003) – 2×CD – studio
- Arcade Fire – Reflektor (2013) – 2×CD – studio
- Neil Ardley, Ian Carr, Mike Gibbs & Stan Tracey – Will Power – A Shakespeare Birthday Celebration in Music (1975; 2005) – 2×LP; 2×CD reissue
- Area – International POPular Group (2005) – 2×CD
- Argent – Argent / Ring Of Hands (2000) – 2×CD reissue
- Armand – Een Beetje Vriendelijkheid (1974) – 2×LP
- Armand – 50 Jaar (1996) – 2×CD compilation
- Arrival – The Complete Recordings of Arrival (2012) – 2×CD reissue
- Art Ensemble of Chicago – Non-Cognitive Aspects of the City (2007) – 2×CD
- Art Zoyd – Phase IV (1982) – 2×LP
- Art Zoyd – Metropolis (2002) – 2×CD
- Art Zoyd – Eyecatcher (2011) – 2×CD
- Die Ärzte – Geräusch (2005) – 2×CD – studio
- Rick Astley – The Best of Me (2019) – 2×CD, 2×LP
- Atomic Rooster – Death Walks Behind You (1970) – 2×LP
- Atomic Rooster – Home To Roost (1977) – 2×LP
- Autechre – Exai (2013) – 2×CD – studio
- The Avalanches – Since I Left You (2000) – 2×LP
- Axiom Ambient – Lost in the Translation (1994) – 2×CD – studio
- Axiom Funk – Funkcronomicon (1995) – 2×CD – studio
- Kevin Ayers – Didn't Feel Lonely Till I Thought Of You (2004) – 2×CD
- Kevin Ayers – The BBC Sessions: 1970–1976 (2006) – 2×CD
- Ayreon – Into the Electric Castle (1998) – 2×CD – studio
- Ayreon – The Human Equation (2004) – 2×CD – studio
- Ayreon – 01011001 (2008) – 2×CD – studio
- Ayreon – The Theory of Everything (2013) – 2×CD – studio
- Ayreon – The Source (2017) – 2×CD – studio

== B ==
- B'z – The 7th Blues (1994) – 2×CD
- Erykah Badu – Mama's Gun (2000) – 1×CD, 2×LP
- Joan Baez – Blessed Are... (1971) – 2×LP
- Joan Baez – Any Day Now: Songs of B. Dylan (1974) – 2×LP reissue
- Joan Baez – The Country Music Album (1979) – 2×LP
- Joan Baez – Very Early Joan (1982) – 2×LP
- Joan Baez – Play Me Backwards (2011) – 2×CD
- Justin Bieber – My Worlds: The Collection (2010) – 2×CD – compilation
- Banco de Gaia – Last Train to Lhasa (1995) – 2×CD – studio
- The Band – The Last Waltz (1978) – 3×LP, 2×CD – live
- Band Of Susans – Wired for Sound (1995) – 2CD compilation
- BAP – Bess Demnähx (1983; 1991) – 2×LP; 2×CD – live
- BAP – ...affrocke!! (1993) – 2×CD – live
- BAP – vun drinne noh drusse (2011) – 2×CD rem. + bonus CD
- Baroness – Yellow & Green (2012) – 2×CD – studio
- The Beatles – 1962–1966 (1973) – 2×LP, 2×CD – compilation
- The Beatles – 1967–1970 (1973) – 2×LP, 2×CD – compilation
- The Beatles – Anthology 1 (1995) – 3×LP, 2×CD – compilation
- The Beatles – Anthology 2 (1996) – 3×LP, 2×CD – compilation
- The Beatles – Anthology 3 (1996) – 3×LP, 2×CD – compilation
- The Beatles – The Beatles' Story (1964) – 2×LP, 1×CD – US
- The Beatles – The Beatles (White Album) (1968) – 2×LP, 2×CD – studio
- The Beatles – Past Masters (1988) – 2×LP – compilation, but part of the core catalogue.
- The Beatles – Rock 'n' Roll Music (1976) – 2×LP, 2×CD – compilation
- Bee Gees – Odessa (1969) – 2×LP, 1×CD – studio
- Bee Gees – Here at Last... Bee Gees... Live (1977) – 2×LP, 2×CD – live
- Bee Gees – Greatest (1979) – 2×LP, 2×CD – compilation
- Tony Bennett & Lady Gaga – Cheek to Cheek Live! 2×LP – live
- Budzma The Best Rock / Budzma The Best Rock/New – 2×CD – studio
- George Benson – Livin' Inside Your Love (1977) – 2×LP – studio
- Leonard Bernstein – Wonderful Town (1998) – 2×CD
- Leonard Bernstein – West Side Story x2 (2011) – 2×CD
- Leonard Bernstein & National Symphony Orchestra – On the Town (1997) – 2×CD
- Chuck Berry – Sweet little rock 'n roller (?) – 2×LP
- Chuck Berry – Golden Decade (1967) – 2×LP
- Chuck Berry – Golden Decade Vol.2 (1972) – 2×LP
- Chuck Berry – Chicago Golden Years – 10 (1974) – 2×LP
- Chuck Berry – Hail! Hail! Rock 'n roll (1988) – 2×LP
- Chuck Berry – Gold (2005)
- Chuck Berry, Bill Haley & Little Richard – The Kings of Rock 'n Roll (1973) – 2×LP
- Bevis Frond – New River Head (1990) – 2×CD – studio
- Bevis Frond – North Circular (1997) – 2×CD – studio
- Beyoncé – I Am... Sasha Fierce (2008) – 2×CD – studio
- Biffy Clyro – Opposites (2013) – 2×CD – studio
- Big Brother and the Holding Company – Ball & Chain (2010)
- Big K.R.I.T. – 4eva Is a Mighty Long Time (2017) – 2×CD – studio
- Bintangs – Live-File (1991) – 2×CD
- Bintangs – Genuine Bull: Deluxe Edition [remastered] (2009) – 2×CD reissue
- Frank Black – Fast Man Raider Man (2006) – 2×CD – studio
- Frank Black – Teenager of the Year (1994) – 2×CD – studio
- The Black Crowes – The southern harmony and musical companion (1992)
- The Black Crowes – By Your Side (1999) – plus bonus cd
- The Black Crowes – The Lost Crowes (2006)
- The Black Crowes – Freak & roll...into the fog (2006)
- The Black Crowes – Croweology (2010)
- Black Sabbath – We Sold Our Soul for Rock 'n' Roll (1976) – 2×LP
- Black Sabbath – Live Evil (1982)
- Black Sabbath – Reunion (1998)
- Black Sabbath – The End: Live in Birmingham (2017)
- Bluebottle Kiss – Doubt Seeds (2006) – 2×CD – studio
- The Blues Brothers – Blues Brothers (1998)
- The Blues Brothers – The Blues Brothers Complete (1998)
- Graham Bond – Solid Bond (1970) – 2×LP
- Graham Bond – This Is Graham Bond (1971) – 2×LP (unreleased)
- Bone Thugs-N-Harmony – The Art of War (1997) – 2×CD – studio
- Bongwater – Double Bummer (1988) – 2×LP, 2×CD – studio
- Boris – Dronevil (2005) – 2×CD – studio
- David Bowie – David Live (1974) – 2×LP – live
- David Bowie – Stage (1978) – 2×LP live
- Brainbox – To You (1972) – 2×LP
- Anthony Braxton – For Alto (1968) – 2×LP – studio
- Dan Ar Braz & L'Héritage des Celtes – Zenith (1998) – 2×CD
- Jacques Brel – Ne me quitte pas (1977) – 2×LP
- Jacques Brel – De 24 Grootste Successen (1988) – 2×LP
- Jacques Brel – Jacques Brel (1990)
- Jacques Brel – Quand on n'a que l'amour (1996)
- Jacques Brel – Infiniment (2003)
- Jacques Brel – Grand Jacques: le siècle d'or (2010)
- Jacques Brel – Des perles de pluie 1954–1960 (2011)
- Jacques Brel & François Rauber – Chansons et musiques de films (2013)
- Brigada Víctor Jara – Por Sendas, Montes e Vales (2000) – 2×CD
- Brinsley Shwartz – Brinsley Shwartz (1978) – compilation of their first two albums
- Herman Brood & The Wild Romance – Herman Brood & His Wild Romance (1992) – 2×CD
- Chris Brown – Heartbreak on a Full Moon (2017) – 2×CD – studio
- Chris Brown – Indigo (2019) – 2×CD – studio
- James Brown – The Payback (1973) – studio
- James Brown – Hell (1974) – 2×LP – studio
- Pete Brown – Before Singing Lessons 1969–77 (1987) – 2×LP compilation
- Pete Brown & Piblokto! – Things May Come and Things May Go but the Art School Dance Goes on Forever (2001) – 2×CD reissue
- Pete Brown & Phil Ryan – Ardours Of The Lost Rake / Coals To Jerusalem (2013) – 2×CD reissue
- Jackson Browne & David Lindley – Love Is Strange (2010) – 2×CD
- Dave Brubeck – A Place In Time (?) – 2×LP
- Dave Brubeck – 80th Birthday Celebration (2000) – 2×CD
- Dave Brubeck – Time Out: Legacy Edition [+ bonus DVD] (2009) – 2×CD + DVD reissue
- Dave Brubeck – The definitive Dave Brubeck on Fantasy, Concord Jazz and Telarc (2010) – 2×CD reissue
- Dave Brubeck – Dave digs Disney: Legacy Edition [remastered] (2011) – 2×CD reissue
- Dave Brubeck & Walter Cronkite – Private Brubeck Remembers (2004) – 2×CD
- Jack Bruce – Cities Of The Heart (1994)
- Roy Buchanan – Sweet Dreams: The Anthology (1992)
- Roy Buchanan – After hours : The early years – 1957–1962 recordings (2016)
- Roy Buchanan – Loading zone / You're not alone (2017) – remastered
- Roy Buchanan – Live at Town Hall 1974 (2018)
- Buena Vista Social Club – Buena Vista Social Club at Carnegie Hall (2008)
- Kenny Burrell – Ellington is Forever, Vol.2 (1975) – 2×LP
- Kenny Burrell – At the Village Vanguard (1999) – 2×CD reissue
- Kenny Burrell – Stolen Moments (2000/2002)
- Kenny Burrell – Introducing Kenny Burrell: First Blue Note sessions (2000)
- Kenny Burrell & John Coltrane – Kenny Burrell and John Coltrane (1976) – 2×LP
- Kate Bush – Aerial (2005) – 2×CD – studio
- Kate Bush – 50 Words for Snow (2011) – 2×LP – studio
- Jerry Butler – Spice of Life (1972) – 2×LP – studio?
- Butthole Surfers – Double Live (1989) – live
- Charlie Byrd – Latin Byrd (1973) – 2×LP compilation
- The Byrds – (Untitled) (1970) – 2×LP – live/studio
- David Byrne & Fatboy Slim – Here Lies Love – (2010) – 2×CD – studio

== C ==
- Cabaret Voltaire – The Conversation (1994) – 2×CD – studio
- Caesars – Strawberry Weed (2008) – 2×CD – studio
- Cactus – Fully Unleashed: The Live Gigs (2004)
- Café Tacvba – Revés/Yo Soy (2000) – 2×CD – studio
- Can – Tago Mago (1971) – 2×LP – studio
- Canned Heat – Living the Blues (1999) – 2×CD
- Canned Heat & John Lee Hooker – Hooker 'n Heat (2002) – 2×CD
- Canned Heat & Henry Vestine – Human Condition Revisited – I Used To Be Mad (2013)
- Jerry Cantrell – Degradation Trip Volumes 1 & 2 (2002) – 2×CD – studio
- Captain Beefheart and his Magic Band – Trout Mask Replica (1969) – 2×LP – studio
- Caravan – Travelling Ways (2001)
- Caravan – In The Land Of Grey And Pink: 40th Anniversary Edition (2011) + bonus DVD
- Cardiacs – Sing to God (1996) – 2×CD – studio
- Wendy Carlos – Sonic Seasonings (1972) – 2×LP – studio
- Caroliner (as Caroliner Rainbow Grace Blocks Used in the Placement of the Personality) – Rings on the Awkward Shadow (1994) – 2×LP – studio
- Johnny Cash – Sings the Ballads of the True West (1965) – studio
- Johnny Cash – The Gospel Road (1973) – 2×LP – studio/soundtrack
- Johnny Cash – A Believer Sings the Truth (1979) – 2×LP – studio
- Ca$his – "Loose Cannon" (2008) – 2×LP – mixtape
- The Cats – Times Where When (1972) – 2×LP
- The Cats – 10 Jaar The Cats (1974) – 2×LP
- The Cats – The Cats (1975) – 2×LP
- The Cats – Alle 40 Goed (2010)
- The Cats – The Golden Years of Dutch Pop Music (2016)
- Eugene Chadbourne & John Zorn (1978) – School – 2×CD – studio
- Paul Chambers & John Coltrane – High Step (1975) – 2×LP
- Chamillionaire – Mixtape Messiah (2004) – 3×CD – mixtape
- Ray Charles – Collection portrait de Ray Charles ( ? ) – 2×LP compilation
- Ray Charles – The Fantastic Ray Charles ( ? ) – 2×LP compilation
- Ray Charles – 25th Anniversary in Show Business
- Ray Charles – Focus on Ray Charles
- Ray Charles – Blues & Jazz (1994)
- Ray Charles & Milt Jackson – Soul Brothers – Soul Meeting (1989)
- Ray Charles & Quincy Jones – Genius + Soul = Jazz. Complete 1956–1960 sessions with Quincy Jones (2011)
- Ray Charles & Cleo Laine – Porgy & Bess
- Cindy Lee – Diamond Jubilee (2024)
- Cody ChesnuTT – The Headphone Masterpiece (2002) – 2×CD – studio
- Chicago – The Chicago Transit Authority (1969) – 2×LP (debut album) – studio
- Chicago – Chicago (1970), later known as Chicago II – 2×LP – studio
- Chicago – Chicago III (1971) – 2×LP – studio
- Chicago – Chicago VII (1974) – 2×LP – studio
- The Chocolate Watch Band – Melts In Your Brain... Not On Your (2005) – 2×CD reissue
- Gary Clark Jr. – Live (2014)
- The Clash – London Calling (1979) – 2×LP – studio
- The Clash – Sandinista! (1980) – 3×LP – studio
- Andrew Dice Clay – The Day the Laughter Died (1990) – 2×CD – live
- Coldplay – Everyday Life (2019) – studio
- J. Cole – The Fall-Off (2026) – 2×CD
- Ornette Coleman – In All Languages (1987) – 2×LP – studio
- Colosseum – Valentyne Suite (2004) – 2×CD reissue
- John Coltrane – The Stardust Session (1975) – 2×LP
- John Coltrane – The Other Village Vanguard Tapes (1976) – 2×LP
- John Coltrane – Wheelin' (1977) – 2×LP
- John Coltrane – Afro Blue Impressions (1977) – 2×LP
- John Coltrane – To The Beat Of A Different Drum (1978) – 2×LP
- John Coltrane – On A Misty Night (1978) – 2×LP
- John Coltrane – Trane's Modes (1979) – 2×LP
- John Coltrane – Rain or Shine (1980) – 2×LP
- John Coltrane – Dakar (1981) – 2×LP
- John Coltrane – The Bethlehem Years (1987) – 2×CD reissue
- John Coltrane – Visit to Scandinavia – 1962 (2011) – 2×CD reissue
- John Coltrane – Rhapsody (2011) – 2×CD reissue
- John Coltrane & Freddie Hubbard & Eric Dolphy & McCoy Tyner & Art Davis & Reggie Workman & Elvin Jones – The Complete Africa / Brass Sessions (1995) – 2×CD reissue
- John Coltrane & McCoy Tyner & Jimmy Garrison & Elvin Jones – Ballads: Deluxe Edition (2005) – 2×CD reissue
- John Coltrane & McCoy Tyner & Jimmy Garrison & Elvin Jones – One Down, One Up – at Half Note (2005) – 2×CD reissue
- Country Joe McDonald – Into The Fray (1981) – 2×LP reissue
- Country Joe and the Fish – Life And Times Of (1971) – 2×LP
- Country Joe and the Fish – Electric Music for the Mind and Body (2013) – 2×CD reissue
- Country Joe and the Fish – I-Feel-Like-I'm-Fixin'-to-Die (2013) – 2×CD reissue
- Kevin Coyne – Marjory Razorblade (1973) – 2×LP – studio
- Kevin Coyne – In Living Black And White (1976) – 2×LP
- Kevin Coyne – Sanity Stomp (1980) – 2×LP
- Kevin Coyne – Knocking On Your Brain (1997) – 2×CD
- Cream – Wheels of Fire (1968) – 2×LP – studio/live
- Cream – Disraeli Gears: Deluxe Edition (2004; 2011)
- Jim Croce – The Faces I've Been (1975) – 2×LP
- Jim Croce – You Don't Mess Around with Jim (2006)
- Crosby & Nash – Crosby & Nash (2004)
- David Cross – Shut Up You Fucking Baby! (2002)
- Cuby + Blizzards – Groeten uit Grollo / Desolation (1970) – 2×LP reissue
- Cuby + Blizzards – 3 Originals + album Sometimes (2009)
- The Cure – Kiss Me, Kiss Me, Kiss Me (1987) – 2×LP – studio
- The Cure – Greatest Hits (2001) – 2×LP (2017 Record Store Day release)
- Cypress Hill – Skull & Bones (2000) – 2×CD – studio

== D ==
- George Dalaras – Tribute to International Cinema (1996) – 2×CD
- George Dalaras – The Colours of Time; Vol. 1 (2001) – 2×CD
- George Dalaras – The Colours of Time; Vol. 2 (2001) – 2×CD
- George Dalaras – A Tribute to Markos Vamvakaris (2004) – 2×CD
- George Dalaras & Vassilis Papakonstantinou – St. Attikon (1991) – 2×CD
- George Dalaras & Mikis Theodorakis – Romiosini / Axion Esti (2008) – 2×CD reissue
- Dâm-Funk – Toeachizown (2009) – 2×CD, 5×LP – studio
- The Damned – The Black Album (1980) – 2×LP – studio
- The Damned – The light of the end of the... (1990)
- The Damned – Play it at your sister + bonus cd (2005)
- Daniel Amos – Mr. Buechner's Dream (2001) – 2×CD – studio
- Darey – Double Dare (2011) – 2×CD – studio
- Wolfgang Dauner – Changes / Zeitläufe (2010) – 2×CD remastered
- Wolfgang Dauner – One Night in '88 / Pas de Trois (2010) – 2×CD remastered
- Miles Davis – Bitches Brew (1970) – 2×LP – studio
- Miles Davis – Live-Evil (1971) – studio/live
- Miles Davis – Black Beauty: Miles Davis at Fillmore West (1973/1997) – 2×LP; 2×CD reissue
- Miles Davis – Dark Magus (1974) – 2×LP – live
- Miles Davis – Big Fun (1974) – 2×LP – compilation
- Miles Davis – Get Up With It (1974) – 2×LP – compilation
- Miles Davis – Agharta (1975) – live
- Miles Davis – Pangaea (1975) – live
- Miles Davis & John Coltrane – With John Coltrane (1974) – 2×LP compilation
- deadmau5 – while(1<2) (2014) – 2×CD – studio
- Death Grips – The Powers That B (2015) – 2×CD
- Deep Purple – Come Taste The Band: 35th Anniversary edition [remastered] (2010)
- Deep Purple – Days May Come And Days May Go: the California Rehearsals June 1975 (2013)
- Deep Purple – The Battle Rages On (2014)
- Deep Purple – Made in Japan [+ extra tracks] (2014)
- Deerhoof – The Runners Four (2005) – studio
- Deerhunter – Microcastle/Weird Era Cont. (2008) – studio
- Derek and the Dominos – Layla and Other Assorted Love Songs (1970) (debut album) – studio
- Al Di Meola – Splendido Hotel (1980) – 2×LP – studio
- Bo Diddley, Little Walter, Muddy Waters & Howlin' Wolf – Super Blues Session (1976) – 2×LP
- Ani DiFranco – Revelling/Reckoning (2001) – 2×CD – studio
- Dio – At Donington UK: Live 1983 & 1987 (2010) – 2×CD
- The Diplomats – Diplomatic Immunity (2002) – studio
- Dire Straits – Alchemy Live (1984) – live
- DJ Khaled – Grateful (2017) – 2×CD – studio
- DJ Rap – Touching Bass (2002) – 2×CD
- Doe Maar – Lijf Aan Lijf (1991) – 2×CD
- Doe Maar – Alles (1999) – 2×CD
- Klaus Doldinger + Passport – Lifelike (1980; 1991) – 2×LP; 2×CD
- Donovan – A Gift from a Flower to a Garden (1968) – 2×LP – studio
- Donovan – H.M.S. Donovan (1971) – 2×LP – studio
- The Doobie Brothers – The Doobie Brothers / Toulouse Street (2011) – 2×CD reissue
- The Doobie Brothers – The Captain And Me / What Were Once Vices Are Now Habits (2011) – 2×CD reissue
- Johnny van Doorn – Oorlog en Pap (2001) – 2×CD reissue
- Dr. Feelgood – As It Happens (1979) – 2×LP
- Drake – Scorpion (2018) – 2×CD – studio
- Dream Theater – Six Degrees of Inner Turbulence (2002) – 2×CD – studio
- Dream Theater – The Astonishing (2016) – 2×CD – studio
- Drive-By Truckers – Southern Rock Opera (2001) – 2×CD – studio
- Bob Dylan – Blonde on Blonde (1966) – studio
- Bob Dylan – Self Portrait (1970) – studio
- Bob Dylan – The Basement Tapes (1975) – studio
- Bob Dylan & Frank Sinatra – Dylan meets Sinatra: The Album (2015)
- Bob Dylan – Rough and Rowdy Ways (2020) – studio

== E ==
- E-40 – The Element of Surprise (1998) – 2×CD – studio
- Eagles – Eagles Live (1980) – live
- Eagles – The Very Best of The Eagles (2003) – studio
- Eagles – Long Road Out of Eden (2007) – studio
- The Early November – The Mother, the Mechanic, and the Path (2006) – 3×CD – studio
- Earth & Fire – 3 Originals (1999) – 2×CD reissue
- Earth, Wind & Fire – Faces (1980) – 2×LP – studio
- Eels – Blinking Lights and Other Revelations (2005) – studio
- 8Ball & MJG – Lost (8Ball album) (1998) studio
- Elastic No-No Band – Fustercluck!!! (2010) – 2×CD – studio
- Electric Light Orchestra – Out of the Blue (1977) – 2×LP – studio
- Electronic – Electronic (2013) – 2×CD reissue
- Embryo – Invisible Documents (1999)
- Embryo – La Blama Sparozzi (2000)
- Embryo – One Night at the Joan Miró Foundation (2000)
- Emerson, Lake & Palmer – Works Volume I (1977) – 2×LP – studio
- Brian Eno – Music for Onmyo-Ji (2000) – 2×CD – studio
- Entombed – DCLXVI: To Ride, Shoot Straight and Speak the Truth (1997)
- Esham – Judgement Day (1992) – studio
- Esbjörn Svensson Trio – Live in Hamburg (2007)
- Esbjörn Svensson Trio – Live in London (2005 / 2018)
- The Ex – Blueprints for a Blackout (1984) – 2×LP – studio
- The Ex – Joggers and Smoggers (1989) – 2×LP, 2×CD – studio
- The Ex – Turn (2004) – 2×CD – studio
- The Ex + Guests – Instant (1995) – 2×CD – studio

== F ==
- Family – Fearless / It's Only A Movie (1989) – 2×CD reissue
- Chris Farlowe – Out Of The Blue / Born Again (1992) – 2×CD reissue
- Fat Mattress – Magic Forest: the Anthology (2006) – 2×CD – compilation
- Faust – Faust is Last (2010) – 2×CD
- José Feliciano – Alive Alive-O! (1969) – 2×LP
- Maynard Ferguson – Color Me Wild (1974) – 2×LP
- Maynard Ferguson – Conducts the Birdland Dreamland (1982) – 2×LP
- Maynard Ferguson – M.F. Horn; M.F. Horn 2; M.F. Horn 3 (remastered) (2013) – 2×CD reissue
- Maynard Ferguson – Primal Scream; New Vintage; Carnival (remastered) (2014) – 2×CD reissue
- Léo Ferré – Verlaine et Rimbaud (1964) – 2×LP
- Léo Ferré – Léo Ferré chante Baudelaire (1967) – 2×LP
- Léo Ferré – Amour Anarchie (1970) – 2×LP
- Léo Ferré – L'Opéra du pauvre (1983) – 4×LP
- Léo Ferré – On n'est pas sérieux quand on a dix-sept ans (1987) – 2×LP
- The Firesign Theatre – Dear Friends (1972) – 2×LP
- The Firesign Theatre – Forward Into The Past (1976) – 2×LP
- Fish – Bouillabaisse (2005) – 2×CD
- Ella Fitzgerald – Ella Fitzgerald Sings the Cole Porter Songbook (1956)
- Ella Fitzgerald – Ella Fitzgerald Sings the Rodgers & Hart Songbook (1956)
- Ella Fitzgerald – Ella Fitzgerald Sings the Duke Ellington Songbook (1957)
- Ella Fitzgerald – Ella Fitzgerald Sings the Irving Berlin Songbook (1958)
- Ella Fitzgerald – Ella Fitzgerald Sings the George and Ira Gershwin Songbook (1959)
- Ella Fitzgerald – Ella Fitzgerald Sings the Harold Arlen Songbook (1961)
- Five Finger Death Punch – "The Wrong Side of Heaven and The Righteous Side of Hell, Volumes 1 and 2"
- The Flaming Lips – Zaireeka (1997) – 4×CD – studio (single album, four different mixes)
- Flairck – Flairck – Alive (1990) – 2×CD
- Flairck – 3 Originals (2005) – 2×CD re-release
- Flairck – Variaties op een Dame / Gevecht met de Engel (2014) – 2×CD re-release
- Fleetwood Mac – Tusk (1979) – 2×LP
- Fleetwood Mac – The Vaudeville Years (1998)
- Fleetwood Mac – Show-Biz Blues (1999)
- The Flower Kings – Stardust We Are (1997) – 2×CD
- The Flower Kings – Flower Power (1999) – 2×CD
- The Flower Kings – Alive on Planet Earth (2000) – 2×CD
- The Flower Kings – Unfold the Future (2002) – 2×CD
- The Flower Kings – Meet the Flower Kings (2003) – 2×CD
- The Flower Kings – Paradox Hotel (2006) – 2×CD
- The Flower Kings – Waiting for Miracles (2018) – 2×CD
- The Flower Kings – Islands (2020) – 2×CD
- The Flower Kings – By Royal Decree (2022) – 2×CD
- Flower Travellin' Band – Make Up (1973) – 2×LP
- The Flying Burrito Brothers – Close Up the Honky Tonks (1974) – 2×LP
- Focus – Focus III (1972) – 2×LP
- Dan Fogelberg – The Innocent Age (1981)
- Foghat – In the Mood / Zig Zag Walk (2000) – 2×CD reissue
- Foghat – Tight Shoes / Girls To Chat (2000) – 2×CD reissue
- Foghat – Road Cases (2001)
- Foo Fighters – In Your Honor (2005) – 2×CD
- Forest – Forest / Full Circle (2011) – 2×CD compilation reissue
- Peter Frampton – Frampton Comes Alive! (1976) – 2×LP
- Frankie Goes to Hollywood – Welcome to the Pleasuredome (1984) – 2×LP, 1×CD (debut album)
- Free – Fire and Water: Deluxe Edition (2010)
- Freedom – Nerosubianco (2002) – 2×LP + bonus tracks reissue
- Robert Fripp & Brian Eno – Beyond Even 1992–2006 (2007) – 2×CD (limited ed.)
- Robert Fripp & Brian Eno – (No Pussyfooting) (2008) – 2×CD reissue
- Fred Frith – The Technology of Tears (1988) – 2×LP
- Fred Frith – Eleventh Hour (2005) – 2×CD
- Fred Frith & Henry Kaiser – Friends & Enemies (1999) – 2×CD
- Edgar Froese – Ages (1978) – 2×LP
- Frost* – Life in the Wires (2024) – 2×CD
- Frumpy – Live (1973 / 2009) – 2×LP / 2×CD re-release
- The Fugs – The Real Woodstock Festival '94 (1995) – 2×CD
- Fungus – The Fungus Collection (2000) – 2×CD reissue
- Funkadelic – America Eats Its Young (1972) – 2×LP
- Future & Metro Boomin – We Still Don't Trust You (2024) – 2×CD, 2×LP
- The Future Sound of London – Lifeforms (1994) – 2×CD

== G ==
- Peter Gabriel – Passion (1989) 2×LP, 1×CD
- Gang of Youths – Go Farther in Lightness (2017)
- Carlos Gardel – 30 Exitos Para El Recuerdo (1985)- 2×LP
- Carlos Gardel – 38 chefs-d'oeuvre (1996)
- The Gathering – How To Measure A Planet? (1998) – 2×CD
- Marvin Gaye – Here, My Dear (1978) – 2×LP
- The Gazette – Division (2012) – 2×CD
- Eelco Gelling – The Missing Link (2000) – 2×CD
- Genesis – The Lamb Lies Down on Broadway (1974) – 2×LP
- Stan Getz & Dave Brubeck – Jazz Summit (1972) – 2×LP
- Gilberto Gil – A Arte de Gilberto Gil (1985) – 2×LP – compilation
- Gilberto Gil – Sou Louco Por Você (2005)
- Gillan – Double Trouble (1989) – 2×LP
- David Gilmour – Live in Gdansk (2008) – 4×LP, 2×CD
- David Gilmour – Live at Pompeii (2017) – 4×LP, 2×CD
- Glass Beach – Plastic Death (2024) – 2×LP
- Glass Beach – The First Glass Beach Album (2019)– 2×LP
- Glass Hammer – The Inconsolable Secret (2005)
- Godspeed You! Black Emperor – Lift Your Skinny Fists Like Antennas To Heaven (2000)
- Golden Earring – On the Double (1969) – 2×LP
- Golden Earring – The Complete Naked Truth (1998)
- Golden Earring – 3 Originals (1999)
- Golden Earring – Last Blast of the Century (2000)
- Golden Earring – Fully Naked (2012)
- Golden Earring – The Long Versions (2013)
- Gong – Gong est Mort, Vive Gong (1977) – 2×LP
- Robert Gordon, Link Wray & his Wraymen – That's Rock 'n' Roll (1980) – 2×LP
- Gracious! – Gracious! / This is... Gracious!! (1995) – 2×CD – reissued
- Grateful Dead – Live/Dead (1969) – 2×LP studio/live
- Grateful Dead – Grateful Dead (1971) – 2×LP
- Grateful Dead – Europe '72 (1972) – 3×LP, 2×CD
- Grateful Dead – Dead Set (1981) – 2×LP
- Grateful Dead – Reckoning (1981) – 2×LP
- Grateful Dead – Without a Net (1990) – 2×CD
- Grateful Dead – Rocking the Cradle: Egypt 1978 (2008) – 2×CD w/ bonus DVD
- Great Guitars – At The Winery / At Charlie's Georgetown (2001) – 2×CD reissue
- Peter Green – Reaching The Cold 100 (2003)
- Peter Green & Fleetwood Mac – Jumping At Shadows / The Blues Years (2007)
- Greenslade – Feathered Friends (2006) – 2×CD
- Grobschnitt – Last Party Live (1990; reissued 2015) – 2×CD
- Raymond van het Groenewoud – Mr.Raymond / Voor de Fans (2005) – 2×CD reissue
- Raymond van het Groenewoud – Kamiel in België / Nooit Meer Drinken (2011) – 2×CD reissue
- Boudewijn de Groot – 5 Jaar Hits (1971) – 2×LP compilation
- Boudewijn de Groot – Dubbel, Twee (1973) – 2×LP reissue
- Boudewijn de Groot – 3 Originals: Waar ik woon en wie ik ben / Van een afstand / Maalstroom (2009) – 2×CD reissue
- The Groundhogs – Best of the Groundhogs 1969–1972 (1974) 2×LP compilation
- The Groundhogs – The Classic British Rock Scene (1975) – 2×LP compilation
- The Groundhogs – Moving fast – Standing still (1986) – 2×LP compilation
- The Groundhogs – Groundhogs live (1999)
- The Groundhogs – 3744 James Road (2001) – 2×CD compilation
- The Groundhogs – 54146 (2001) – 2×CD compilation
- The Groundhogs – Joker's Grave (2005) – 2×CD reissue
- Guns N' Roses – Use Your Illusion I (1991) – 2×LP, 1×CD – studio
- Guns N' Roses – Use Your Illusion II (1991) – 2×LP, 1×CD – studio
- Guru Guru – Der Elektrolurch (1974) – 2×LP
- Arlo Guthrie & Pete Seeger – Precious Friend (1990) – 2×CD reissue
- Buddy Guy – Chicago Golden Years Vol.6 (1988) – 2×LP
- Buddy Guy – Rhythm & Blues (2013) – 2×CD
- Buddy Guy & Otis Rush & Magic Sam – Snakebite (2009) – 2×CD

== H ==
- Steve Hackett – The Tokyo Tapes (1998)
- Steve Hackett – Out of the Tunnel's Mouth (2010)
- Steve Hackett – Live Rails (2011)
- Steve Hackett – Beyond the Shrouded Horizon (2011)
- Steve Hackett – Genesis Revisited II; Vol.2 (2012) – limited edition
- Nina Hagen – Om Namah Shivay (2002)
- Nina Hagen Band – Nina Hagen Band / Unbehagen (1989) – 2×LP, 2×CD reissue
- Half Japanese – 1/2 Gentlemen/Not Beasts (1980) (debut album)
- HammerFall – One Crimson Night (2003)
- Hampton Grease Band – Music to Eat (1971) (debut album)
- Tim Hardin – Hang On To A Dream: the Verve Recordings (1997) – 2×CD
- Harmonium – L'Heptade (1976) – 2×LP
- Ben Harper – Both Sides Of The Gun (2006)
- Roy Harper – Born in Captivity / Work of Heart (1988) – 2×CD reissue
- Roy Harper – Counter Culture (2005)
- Roy Harper – Songs of Love and Loss (2011)
- George Harrison – All Things Must Pass (1970) – 3×LP; 2001 remastered version 2×CD
- Have A Nice Life – Deathconsciousness (2008)
- Hawkwind – Space Ritual (1973)
- Darren Hayes – This Delicate Thing We've Made (2007)
- Isaac Hayes – Black Moses (1971)
- Heaven – Brass Rock 1 (1971)
- Heldon – It's Always Rock and Roll (1975) – 2×LP
- Helloween – Keeper of the Seven Keys – The Legacy (2005) – 2×CD
- Helloween – United Alive in Madrid (2019) – 3×CD
- Help Yourself – Strange Affair / Beware of the Shadow (1997) – 2×LP re-release
- Help Yourself – Strange Affair / The Return of Ken Whaley / Happy Days (1999) – 2×CD re-release
- Jimi Hendrix – Winterland Night (2005) – 2×CD
- The Jimi Hendrix Experience – Electric Ladyland (1968) – 2×LP
- Henry Cow – Concerts (1976; 2006) – 2×LP;2×CD reissue
- Steve Hillage – For To Next / And Not Or (1983) – 2×LP reissue
- Arno Hintjens – Charles Ernest (2002)
- Arno Hintjens – Arno Brusseld: Life To The Beat (2010) – 2×LP
- Arno Hintjens – Ratata / Charlatan (2011) – 2×CD reissue
- Bruce Hornsby – Here Come The Noise Makers (2001) – 2×CD
- Bruce Hornsby – Bride of the Noisemakers (2011) – 2×CD
- Howard Morrison Quartet – The Fabulous Howard Morrison Quartet (January 1965) – 2×LP
- The Housemartins – London 0 Hull 4 (2009) – 2×CD remastered deluxe ed.
- Freddie Hubbard – Riding High / Solo Brother / Professor Jive (1990) – 2×CD
- Humble Pie – Eat It (1973) – 2×LP
- Humble Pie – Natural Born Bugie (2000) – 2×CD
- Humble Pie – Home and Away (2004) – 2×CD
- Hannah Montana/Miley Cyrus – Hannah Montana 2: Meet Miley Cyrus (2007) – 2×LP
- Ian Hunter – The Ballad of Ian Hunter and Mott the Hoople (1979) – 2×LP
- Ian Hunter – Welcome to the Club (1980) -2×LP
- Hüsker Dü – Zen Arcade (1984) – 2×LP
- Hüsker Dü – Warehouse: Songs and Stories (1987) – 2×LP

== I ==
- The Incredible String Band – Wee Tam and the Big Huge (1968) – 2×LP
- The Incredible String Band – U (1970) – 2×LP
- Indochine – Alice & June (2005) 2×CD (limited edition)
- Iron Butterfly – Ball / Metamorphosis (1974) – 2×LP reissue
- Iron Maiden – Live After Death (1985)
- Iron Maiden – Death on the Road (2004)
- Iron Maiden – Flight 666 (2009) – 2×CD
- Iron Maiden – The Book of Souls (2015) – 2×CD – Studio
- Iron Maiden – Senjutsu (2021) – 2×CD – Studio
- The Isley Brothers – Timeless (1978) – 2×LP
- The Isley Brothers – Winner Takes All (1979) – 2×LP
- IQ – Subterranea (1997) – 2×CD
- IQ – Resistance (2019) – 2×CD

== J ==
- Joe Jackson – Live 1980/86 (1988) – 2×LP
- Joe Jackson – This Is It: the A&M Years 1979–1989 (1997)
- Joe Jackson – Greatest Hits And More (2001)
- Joe Jackson – Night and Day (2003) – 2×CD deluxe edition
- Joe Jackson – The Ultimate Collection (2003)
- Joe Jackson – Gold (2008)
- Joe Jackson – At the BBC (2009) – live
- Joe Jackson – Live at Rockpalast (2012)
- Joe Jackson – Afterlive (2014) – live compilation
- Michael Jackson – Dangerous (1991) – 2×LP, 1×CD
- Michael Jackson – HIStory (1995) – 3×LP, 2×CD
- Michael Jackson – The Essential Michael Jackson (2005) – 2×CD
- Tommy James and the Shondells – It's A New Vibration (1998) – 2×CD
- Tommy James and the Shondells – French 60's ep & sp collection (2000) – 2×CD reissue
- Tommy James and the Shondells – Hanky Panky / It's Only Love / I Think We're Alone Now (2013) – 2×CD reissue
- Jandek – Newcastle Sunday (2006) – 2×CD
- Jandek – Glasgow Monday: The Cell (2006) – 2×CD
- Jane – Rock on Brain (1980) – 2×LP compilation
- Japan (band) – Oil On Canvas (1984) – live
- Keith Jarrett – The Köln Concert (1975)
- Keith Jarrett – Book of Ways (1987)
- Keith Jarrett – My Foolish Heart (2007) – live
- Jay-Z – The Blueprint 2: The Gift & the Curse (2002) – 2×CD
- Jefferson Airplane – Flight Log (1977) – 2×LP
- Jefferson Airplane – 1600 Fulton Street (1987) – 2×LP
- Jefferson Airplane – The Essential (2005) – 2×CD compilation
- Jefferson Airplane – Last Flight (2007) – 2×CD live
- Jefferson Airplane – The Woodstock Experience (2009) – 2×CD live / reissue
- Jefferson Starship – Across The Sea Of Suns (2002) – 2×CD reissue
- Jethro Tull – Living in the Past (1972) – 2×LP
- Jethro Tull – Bursting Out (1978) – 2×LP
- Jhené Aiko – Trip (2017) – 2×CD – studio
- Billy Joel – Songs in the Attic / Piano Man (?) – 2×LP
- Billy Joel – Streetlife Serenade / 52nd Street (?) – 2×LP
- Billy Joel – Greatest Hits, Vol. 1 & 2 (1985) – 2×LP
- Billy Joel – Kohuept – Live in Leningrad 87 (1987) – 2×LP
- Billy Joel – The Bridge / Glass Houses (1990) – 2×CD compilation reissue
- Billy Joel – River of Dreams / Five Live (1994) – 2×CD compilation reissue
- Billy Joel – The Ultimate Collection (2000) – studio + live compilation
- Billy Joel – 2000 Years: The Millenium Concert (2001) – 2×CD live
- Billy Joel – 12 Gardens: Live (2006) – 2×CD
- Billy Joel – The Stranger: 30th Anniversary edition [+ bonus DVD] (2008)
- Billy Joel – The Stranger: The original album; Live at Carnegie Hall 1977 (2008)
- Billy Joel – Live at Shea Stadium [+ bonus DVD] (2011)
- Billy Joel – Piano Man (2011) – 2×CD live reissue
- Elton John – Goodbye Yellow Brick Road (1973) – 2×LP, 1×CD
- Elton John –Blue Moves (1976)
- Elton John – Here and There (1976) (1995 expanded version) – 2×CD
- Elton John – Greatest Hits: 1970–2002 (2002) – 2×CD
- John's Children – The complete John's Children (2002) – compilation reissue
- Cody Johnson – Human: The Double Album (2022) – 2×CD studio
- Janis Joplin – In Concert (1972) – 2×LP
- Janis Joplin – Pearl / I Got Dem Ol' Kozmic Blues Again Mama (1988) – 2×CD reissue
- Janis Joplin – Anthology (1990)
- Janis Joplin – Janis / Early Performances (1993) – 2×CD reissue
- Janis Joplin – Pearl: Legacy Edition (2009) – 2×CD reissue
- Janis Joplin – The Essential Janis Joplin (2009)
- Janis Joplin – The Woodstock Experience (2009) – 2×CD, limited edition
- Janis Joplin – Cry Baby: The Ultimate Collection [+ bonus DVD] (2009)
- Janis Joplin – Absolute Janis (2010) – 2×CD – compilation
- Journey – Captured (1981) – 2×LP
- Judas Priest – Priest...Live! (1987) – 2×LP
- Judas Priest – Metal Works '73–'93 (1993) – 2×CD
- Judas Priest – Nostradamus (2008) – 2×CD/LP
- Junkie XL – Radio JXL: A Broadcast From the Computer Hell Cabin
- Johannes – Johannes (2006) – 2×CD

== K ==
- Kansas – Two for the Show (1978)
- Paul Kantner – A Guide through the Chaos (2000)
- Paul Kantner – A Martian Christmas (2013)
- John Kay & Steppenwolf – Live at 25 (1996)
- Kayak – Chance for a Live Time (2001) – 2×CD
- Kayak – Greatest Hits and More (2001)
- Kayak – 3 Originals (2002) – 2×CD compilation reissue
- Kayak – Nostradamus - The Fate of Man (2005)
- Kayak – Letters From Utopia (2009)
- Kayak – The Anniversary Concert - Live in Paradiso (2009)
- Kayak – Eyewitness / Merlin (2013) – 2×CD compilation reissue
- Kayak – Cleopatra: the Crown of Isis (2014)
- Kayak – The Golden Years of Dutch Pop Music (2015) – 2×CD compilation
- Kazik – Czterdziesty pierwszy (2004) – 2×CD
- Paul Kelly – Gossip – (1986) – 2×CD
- R. Kelly – R. (1998) – 2×CD
- R. Kelly – Happy People/U Saved Me (2004) – 2×CD
- Kensington – Vultures (2013) – w/ bonus live cd
- Toby Keith – 35 Biggest Hits (2008) – 2×CD
- Kid Cudi – Speedin' Bullet 2 Heaven (2015) – 2×CD
- Freddie King – King Of The Blues (1995)
- Freddie King – Texas In My Blues (2013)
- Freddie King – Selected sides 1960–1962: the Texas Cannonball (remastered) (2014)
- King Crimson – Absent Lovers: Live in Montreal (1998) – 2×CD
- The Kinks – Everybody's in Show-Biz (1972)
- The Kinks – Kronikles (1972) – 2×LP
- The Kinks – Preservation: Act 2 (1974)
- The Kinks – One for the Road (1980)
- Kin Ping Meh – Concrete (1976) – 2×LP
- Kin Ping Meh – Hazy Age On Stage (1991) – 2×LP
- Richard H. Kirk – Time High Fiction (1983) – 2×LP, 2×CD
- Kiss – Alive! (1975) – 2×LP
- Kiss – The Originals (1976) – 3×LP
- Kiss – Alive II (1977) – 2×LP
- Kiss – Double Platinum (1978) – 2×LP
- Kiss – KISS Symphony: Alive IV (2003)
- Kitaro – An Ancient Journey (2001) – 2×CD
- Klute – Lie, Cheat & Steal (2003) – 2×CD
- The Knife – Tomorrow, In a Year (2010) – 2×CD
- Mark Knopfler – Privateering (album) (2013)
- Koda Kumi – Universe (2010)
- Ricky Koole – Harmonium Live (2009)
- Al Kooper – Easy Does It (1970)
- Al Kooper – Al's Big Deal – Unclaimed Freight (1975) – 2×LP
- Alexis Korner – Alexis Korner and...1961–1972 (1986) – 2×LP – compilation
- Alexis Korner – Kornerstoned : The Alexis Korner Anthology 1954–1983 (2006) – 2×CD
- Alexis Korner – Easy Rider: Cool, calm & collected... the founding father of British blues (2012) – 2×CD – compilation
- Alexis Korner & Friends – The Party Album (1979) – 2×LP
- k-os – BLack on BLonde (2013) – 2×CD
- Kraan – Kraan Live (1975) – 2×LP
- Kraan – Starportrait (1978) – 2×LP, compilation
- Kraan – 2 Schallplatten (1983) – 2×LP re-issue
- Kraan – Live 88 (1988) – 2×LP
- Kraan – Kraan / Wintrup (2011) – 2×CD compilation re-issue
- Kraftwerk – Kraftwerk 2 (1973) – 2×LP U.K. reissue
- Kraftwerk – Doppelalbum (1976) – 2×LP compilation
- Kraftwerk – The Mix (1991) 2×LP
- Kraftwerk – Minimum-Maximum (2005) – 2×CD – live
- Kramer – The Guilt Trip (1992) – 2×CD
- Alison Krauss & Union Station – Live (2002) – 2×CD
- Krayzie Bone – Thug Mentality 1999 (1999) – 2×CD
- Krokodil – Sweat & Swim (1973; 2015) – 2×LP; 2×CD remastered reissue
- Kronos Quartet – The Complete Landmark Sessions (1999) – 2×CD
- Kruder & Dorfmeister – The K & D Sessions (1998) – 4×LP, 2×CD
- Kurupt – Kuruption! (1998) – 2×CD

== L ==
- Ladysmith Black Mambazo – Gospel Songs (2001)
- Ladysmith Black Mambazo – The Ultimate Collection (2007)
- Ladysmith Black Mambazo – The Pure and the Golden (2012)
- Ladysmith Black Mambazo – Ladysmith Black Mambazo and Friends (2012)
- Laibach – Baptism (1986) – 2×LP
- Lambchop – Aw Cmon/No You Cmon (2004) – 2×CD
- Kendrick Lamar – Mr. Morale & the Big Steppers (2022) – 2×CD
- Miranda Lambert — The Weight of These Wings (2016) 2×CD
- Bill Laswell – Hear No Evil (2009) – 2×CD
- Gordon Lightfoot- Gord's Gold (1975)
- LCD Soundsystem – LCD Soundsystem (2005)
- LCD Soundsystem – Sound of Silver (2007) – 2×LP
- LCD Soundsystem – This Is Happening (2010) – 2×LP
- LCD Soundsystem – American Dream (2017) – 2×LP
- Led Zeppelin – Physical Graffiti (1975)
- Led Zeppelin – The Song Remains the Same (1976)
- Led Zeppelin – Remasters (1990) – 2×CD compilation
- Led Zeppelin – Boxed Set 2 (1993) – 2×CD compilation reissue
- Led Zeppelin – BBC Sessions (1997) – live
- Led Zeppelin – Mothership (2007) – 2×CD remastered compilation
- Led Zeppelin – Celebration Day: Recorded live December 10, 2007 O2 Arena, London [+ bonus DVD's] (2012)
- Alvin Lee – The Anthology; Vol.2 (2013)
- Alvin Lee – The Anthology (2013)
- Alvin Lee – In Fight (2013)
- Thijs van Leer – Introspection Collection (1989) – 2×CD reissue
- Lemmy – Damage Case (2006) – 2×CD compilation
- John Legend – Legend (2022)
- Jamie Lenman – Muscle Memory (2013)
- John Lennon – Some Time in New York City (1972) – studio/live
- Lift to Experience – The Texas-Jerusalem Crossroads (2001)
- Lil Dicky – Professional Rapper (2015) – 2×CD – studio
- Lil Flip – U Gotta Feel Me (2003)
- Lil Uzi Vert – Eternal Atake: Lil Uzi Vert vs. the World 2 (2020) –2×CD – deluxe edition
- Lil Uzi Vert – Pink Tape (2023) – 2×LP, 2×CD – studio
- Lil Wayne – Tha Carter V (2018) – 2×CD – studio
- Rick van der Linden – Rainbow (1998)
- Udo Lindenberg – Intensivstationen (1993) – 2×CD live
- Little Feat – Waiting for Columbus (1978) – 2×LP – live
- Little Tragedies – New Faust (2003)
- Little Tragedies – Chinese Songs (2007)
- Little Walter – Boss Blues Harmonica (1984) – 2×CD compilation
- Little Walter – The Essential Little Walter (1993) – 2×CD compilation
- Little Walter – Blues With A Feelin' (1997) – 2×CD compilation
- The Liverpool Scene – Amazing Adventures Of / Bread On The Night (2002) – 2×CD reissue
- Livin' Blues – 3 Originals + Album (1998) – 2×CD reissue
- Livin' Blues – Bamboozle / Rocking at the Tweed Mill (2013) – 2×CD reissue
- Nils Lofgren – Night After Night (1977) – 2×LP – live
- Nils Lofgren – Steal Your Heart (1996) – 2×CD – live
- Jack Logan – Bulk (1994) – 2×CD
- Loggins and Messina – On Stage (1974)
- Loggins and Messina – Finale (1977)
- Los Lobos – Just Another Band From East L.A. (1993) – 2×CD
- Loop – Fade Out (2008) – 2×CD reissue
- Loop – A Gilded Eternity (2009)
- Lothar and the Hand People – Space Hymn (2003) – 2×CD compilation reissue
- Loudness – Sunburst (2021) – 2×CD
- Jacques Loussier – Play Bach (1965) – 2×LP
- Jacques Loussier – Play Bach aux Champs-Élysées (1965) – 2×LP
- Jacques Loussier – Play Bach 2000 (1995) – 2×CD
- Jacques Loussier – Jacques Loussier play Bach (1996) – 2×CD
- Jacques Loussier – Toccata: Jacques Loussier play Bach (2000) – 2×CD
- Jacques Loussier – Plays Bach: Encore! (2007) – 2×CD
- Jacques Loussier – Plays Johann Sebastian Bach (2010) – 2×CD
- Love – Out Here (1969)
- Arjen Lucassen – Lost in the New Real (2012)
- LTJ Bukem – Journey Inwards (2000) – 2×CD, 4×LP
- Lynyrd Skynyrd – One More from the Road (1976) – 2×LP
- Lynyrd Skynyrd – Gold & Platinum (1979) – 2×LP
- Lynyrd Skynyrd – Lynyrd Skynyrd Lyve: The Vicious Cycle Tour (2004) – 2×CD

== M ==
- M83 – Hurry Up, We're Dreaming (2011) – 2×CD
- Trixie Mattel – The Blonde & Pink Albums (2022)
- Martine McCutcheon – The Collection (2012) – 2×CD
- MC5 – Back in the USA / Kick Out The Jams (2008) – 2×CD reissue
- Paul McCartney – Tripping the Live Fantastic (1990) – 3×LP, 2×CS, 2×CD
- Paul McCartney – Liverpool Oratorio (1991) – 2×CD
- Paul McCartney – Back in the US (2002) – 2×CD
- Brownie McGhee – The Complete Brownie McGhee (1994) – 2×CD – compilation
- Roger McGuinn, Gene Clark & Chris Hillman – The Capitol Collection (2008) – 2×CD
- Nellie McKay – Get Away from Me (2004) – 2×CD
- Nellie McKay – Pretty Little Head (2006) – 2×CD
- Rod McKuen & Liesbeth List – Two Against The Morning (1972) – 2×LP
- Malcolm McLaren – Paris (1994) – 2×CD
- John McLaughlin – Remember Shakti (1999)
- John McLaughlin – Five Peace Band Live (2009)
- John McLaughlin – The Essential John McLaughlin (2009) – compilation
- John McLaughlin feat. Lifetime – In Retrospect (1974) – 2×LP – compilation
- John McLaughlin, Paco de Lucía & Al Di Meola – Friday Night in San Francisco (1981) – 2×LP
- Grant McLennan – Horsebreaker Star (1994) – 2×CD
- Tony McPhee & The Groundhogs – High On The Hog (2004) – 2×CD
- Machiavel – Live (1999)
- Machiavel – Anthology (2001)
- Machiavel – Live in Brussels (2007)
- Madness – Divine Madness (1992)
- Madura – Madura (1971)
- Frederik Magle – Like a Flame (2010)
- Mahavishnu Orchestra – Live at Montreux 1974 & 1984 (2007) – 2×DVD
- Magma – Kobaïa (1970) – 2×LP (debut album)
- Magna Carta – Spotlight On Magna Carta (1977) – 2×LP
- Magna Carta – Milestones (1994)
- Magna Carta – Where To Now? (2000)
- Magna Carta – In Tomorrow [+ bonus DVD] (2006)
- Magna Carta – Written in the Wind (2008)
- Magna Carta – Tomorrow never comes: the anthology 1969 – 2006 (2010)
- Magna Carta – Deserted Highways of the Heart... (2014)
- The Magnetic Fields – 69 Love Songs (1999) – 3×CD
- Mägo de Oz – Finisterra (2000) – 2×CD
- Mägo de Oz – Fölktergeist (2002) – 2×CD
- Mägo de Oz – Madrid – Las Ventas (2005) – 2×CD
- Mägo de Oz – Gaia II: La Voz Dormida (2005) – 2×CD
- Yngwie Malmsteen – Eclipse Double Pack (1991) – 2×CD reissue
- Yngwie Malmsteen – Yngwie Malmsteen: Live (1998)
- Man – Back into the Future
- Man – Green Fly (1986) – 2×LP compilation
- Man – The Dawn of Man (1997) – 2×CD compilation
- Man – 3 Decades of Man: the 70s & 80s &90s (2000)
- Man – Many are called but few get up (2001) – compilation
- Man – London 1972 (2002) – live
- Man – And in the beginning...complete early Man 1968–1969 (2004)
- Man – Live At The Keystone, Berkeley, 9th August 1976 (2005)
- Man – The History of Man (2005)
- Man – Keep On Crinting 1971–1975 (2008)
- Man – Live at The Marquee + bonus DVD (2012)
- Man – The Welsh Connection (2013)
- Manassas – Manassas (1972) – 2×LP (debut album)
- Mandrill – Fencewalk: The Anthology (1997)
- Mango Groove – Faces to the Sun (2016)
- Manfred Mann – Mann Made / The Five Faces (1983) – 2×LP reissue
- Manfred Mann – Mighty Garvey! / As Is (1987) – 2×LP reissue
- Manfred Mann – The Ascent Of Mann: 1966–1969 (1997) – 2×CD – compilation
- Manfred Mann's Earth Band – The Evolution of Manfred Mann (1998) – 2×CD – compilation
- Manfred Mann's Earth Band – Mann Alive (2003)
- Manic Street Preachers – Generation Terrorists (1992) – debut album, 2×LP, 1×CD
- Michael Mantler, Jack Bruce, Don Cherry, Carla Bley, Robert Wyatt, Kevin Coyne & Chris Spedding – No Answer / Silence (2003) – 2×CD
- Mark-Almond – The Last & Live (1981) – 2×LP
- Marillion – The Best of Both Worlds (1997) – 2×CD
- Marillion – Marbles (2004) – 2×CD
- Marina – Love + Fear (2019) – 2×LP
- Bob Marley – Babylon By Bus (1978) – 2×LP
- John Martyn – John Martyn: Live (1995)
- John Martyn – One World: deluxe edition (2004)
- John Martyn – Anthology (2004)
- John Martyn – Grace and Danger: deluxe edition (2007)
- John Martyn – Remembering John Martyn (1948–2009) (2009)
- John Martyn – Johnny Boy would love this...a tribute to John Martyn [+ bonus dvd] (2011)
- John Martyn – Solid Air (deluxe edition) (2013)
- John Martyn – Piece by Piece (remastered) (2015)
- John Martyn – Sapphire (2015)
- John Martyn – Live at Leeds (deluxe edition) (2015)
- Dave Mason – Certified Live (1976) – 2×LP
- Massada – Live (1981) – 2×LP
- Massada – De jonge jaren van Massada (2008)
- Matching Mole – Little Red Record (2012) – 2×CD reissue
- Matching Mole – Matching Mole (2013) – 2×CD reissue
- The Maxters – T-Bass (2009) – 2×LP, 2×CD
- John Mayall – Room to Move: 1969–1974 (1993)
- John Mayall – London Blues: 1964–1969 (1993)
- John Mayall – Rock The Blues Tonight (1999)
- John Mayall – The Turning Point: Music From The Original Film Soundtrack (1999)
- John Mayall – New year, New band, New company / Lots Of People (2000) – 2×CD reissue
- John Mayall – A Hard Core Package / The Last Of The British Blues (2000) – 2×CD reissue
- John Mayall – Notice To Appear / A Banquet In Blues (2000) – 2×CD reissue
- John Mayall – Rockin' the Roadshow (2003) – live
- John Mayall – 70th Birthday Concert (2003) – live
- John Mayall – Back To The Roots (2013)
- John Mayall & the Bluesbreakers – Live 1969 (2004)
- John Mayall & the Bluesbreakers – The Diary Of A Band (2007) – compilation
- John Mayall & the Bluesbreakers – In The Shadow Of Legends (2011) – live
- John Mayall & Eric Clapton & The Bluesbreakers – Blues Breakers John Mayall and Eric Clapton (2009) – 2×CD reissue
- Meat Beat Manifesto – Subliminal Sandwich (1996) – 2×CD
- Mecano – Ana Jose Nacho (1998)
- Megadeth – Rude Awakening (2002) – 2×CD
- Megadeth – That One Night: Live in Buenos Aires (2007)
- Megadeth – Anthology: Set the World Afire (2008)
- Melanie – Photograph (2005) – 2×CD
- Natalie Merchant – Leave Your Sleep – (2010) – 2×CD
- Metallica – ...And Justice For All (1988) – 2×LP
- Metallica – Live Shit: Binge and Purge (1993) – 3×CD
- Metallica – Garage Inc. (1998) – 2×CD
- Metallica – S&M (1999) – 2×CD
- Metallica and Lou Reed – Lulu (2011) – 2×CD
- Metallica – Hardwired...To Self-Destruct (2016) – 2×CD
- Pat Metheny – 80/81 (1980)
- Pat Metheny – Travels: Recorded live in concert (1982)
- Pat Metheny – Trio → Live (2000)
- Pat Metheny – Secret Story (2007)
- Pat Metheny – The Orchestrion Project (2013)
- Pat Metheny & Charlie Haden – Live in Germany (2003)
- Method Actors – Little Figures (1981) – 2×LP
- MGMT – Congratulations (2010) – 2×LP
- MGMT – Little Dark Age (2018) – 2×LP
- Migos – Culture II (2018) – 2×CD – studio
- Miley Cyrus/Hannah Montana – Hannah Montana 2: Meet Miley Cyrus (2007) – 2×CD
- Steve Miller Band – Anthology (1972) – 2×LP
- Steve Miller Band – King Biscuit Flower Hour Presents (2004) – 2×CD live
- Steve Miller Band – The Sessions (2009) – 2×CD live
- Buddy Miles – Sneak Attack (1981) – 2×LP
- Milton Nascimento & Lo Borges – Clube Da Esquina (1972)
- Kylie Minogue – Intimate and Live (1998) – 2×CD
- Kylie Minogue – Ultimate Kylie (2004) – 2×CD
- Kylie Minogue – Showgirl Homecoming Live (2007) – 2×CD
- Minutemen – Double Nickels on the Dime (1984) – 2×LP
- Minutemen – Ballot Result (1987) – 2×LP
- Joni Mitchell – Miles Of Aisles (1974) – 2×LP
- Joni Mitchell – Don Juan's Reckless Daughter (1977)
- Joni Mitchell – Shadows and Light (1980)
- The MO – Mo / Ha ha! The Sound of Laughing (2013) – 2×CD reissue
- Moby – Rare: The Collected B-Sides 1989-1993 (1996) – 2×CD
- Moby Grape – Vintage / The Very Best Of (1993) – 2×CD reissue
- Modern Talking – Alone (1999) – 2×CD
- Modest Mouse – The Lonesome Crowded West (1997) – 2×LP
- Modest Mouse – The Moon and Antarctica (2000) – 2×LP
- Moka Only – Summer 2002 (2022) – 2×CD
- Mötley Crüe – Live: Entertainment or Death (1999)
- Mötley Crüe – Red, White & Crüe (2005) – 2×CD
- Mötley Crüe – Carnival of Sins Live (2006)
- Moloko – All Back to the Mine (2001) – 2×CD
- Thelonious Monk & John Coltrane – Monk / Trane (1973) – 2×LP – compilation
- The Moody Blues – This Is The Moody Blues (1974) – 2×LP
- The Moody Blues – Caught Live + 5 (1977) – 2×LP
- Keith Moon – Two Sides of the Moon (2006) – 2×CD deluxe edition
- Moon Safari – Blomljud (2008) – 2×CD
- Lee Morgan – Live at the Lighthouse (1971) – 2×LP
- Ennio Morricone – Il Était Une Fois...La Révolution / 22 Musiques Des Films De... (1976) – 2×LP reissue
- Ennio Morricone – Zijn Grootste Successen (1979) – 2×LP – compilation
- Ennio Morricone – The Greatest Filmmelodies Of... (1980) – 2×LP – compilation
- Ennio Morricone – Bandes et Musiques Originales (1984) – 2×LP
- Ennio Morricone – An Ennio Morricone Anthology (1996) – 2×CD
- Ennio Morricone – Film Music 1966–1987 (1997) – 2×CD – anthology
- Ennio Morricone – A Fistful of Sounds (1999) – 2×CD – anthology
- Ennio Morricone – Crime and Dissonance (2005) – 2×CD – anthology
- Ennio Morricone – The Man and his Music (2009) – 2×CD – anthology
- Ennio Morricone – Ennio Morricone Lounge Classics (2009) – 2×CD
- Ennio Morricone – La Piovra (2010) – 2×CD
- Ennio Morricone – Morricone Aromatico (2010) – 2×CD
- Ennio Morricone – Ennio Morricone: Deluxe Edition (2011) – 2×CD
- Ennio Morricone – Arena Concerto: Recorded live in Verona, Naples and Rome (2011) – 2×CD
- Ennio Morricone – Days of Heaven: Music from the motion picture (2013) – 2×CD
- Van Morrison – It's Too Late to Stop Now (1974)
- Van Morrison – Hymns to the Silence (1991)
- Neal Morse – Testimony (2003) – 2×CD
- Neal Morse – Testimony 2 (2011) – 2×CD
- The Neal Morse Band – The Similitude of a Dream (2016) – 2×CD
- The Neal Morse Band – The Great Adventure (2019) – 2×CD
- The Neal Morse Band – Innocence & Danger (2021) – 2×CD
- Mother's Finest – Right Here, Right Now: Live at Villa Berg (2006)
- Mother's Finest – Live at Rockpalast 1978 + 2003 (2012)
- Motörhead – No Remorse (1985) – 2×LP – compilation
- Motörhead – The Best Of (2000) – 2×CD – compilation
- Motörhead – Tear Ya Down: the Rarities (2002) – live
- Motörhead – Live at Brixton Academy (2003)
- Motörhead – BBC Live & In-Session (2005) – 2×CD – reissue
- Motörhead – Bomber + extra tracks (2005)
- Motörhead – The Essential Motörhead (2007)
- Motörhead – Better Motörhead than Dead: Live at Hammersmith (2007)
- Motörhead – Overkill: Deluxe edition + bonus tracks (2008)
- Motörhead – Iron Fist: Deluxe edition + extra tracks (2008)
- Motörhead – Ace of Spades: Deluxe edition + bonus tracks (2008)
- Motörhead – Bomber: Deluxe edition + bonus tracks (2008)
- Motörhead – No Sleep 'til Hammersmith: Deluxe edition (2009)
- Motörhead – The Wörld is Ours: Everywhere further than anyplace else [+ bonus dvd], vol.1 (2011)
- Motörhead – Another Perfect Day: Expanded edition (2015)
- Motörhead – Orgasmatron [+ bonus cd] (2015)
- Motörhead – Rock 'n Roll (2015)
- Motörhead – No Remorse [+ bonus tracks] (2015)
- Motorpsycho – Timothy's Monster (1994) – 3×LP, 2×CD
- Motorpsycho – Trust Us (1998) – 2×CD
- Motorpsycho – Black Hole/Blank Canvas (2006) – 2×CD
- Mountain – Over the Top (1995)
- Mountain – New Year Concert 1971 (2012)
- Mount Eerie – Wind's Poem (2009) – 2×LP
- The Move – Shazam / Looking On The Move (?) – 2×LP reissue
- The Move – The Platinum Collection of The Move (1981) – 2×LP
- The Move – The Collection (1986) – 2×LP
- The Move – Hits & Rarities, singles A's & B's (2005) – 2×CD
- The Move – Move (2007) – 2×CD
- Mr. Albert Show – Mr.Albert Show / Warm Motor (2014) – 2×CD reissue
- Mr. Oizo – Lambs Anger (2008) – 2×LP
- Muse – Hullabaloo Soundtrack (2002) – 2×CD
- My Bloody Valentine – Loveless (1991) – 2012 2×CD reissue

== N ==
- Nas – Street's Disciple (2004) – 2×LP
- Nate Dogg – G-Funk Classics, Vol. 1 & 2 (1998)
- Nektar – Highlights (2001)
- Nektar – Sunday Night at London Roundhouse (2010) – 2×CD re-release
- Nektar – Retrospective 1969–1980 (2011)
- Nektar – Magic Is a Child (2014) – 2×CD deluxe edition
- Nektar – Live at the Patriots Theatre (2014)
- Willie Nelson – Willie and Family Live (1978) – 2×LP
- Willie Nelson – Greatest Hits (& Some That Will Be) (1981) – 2×LP
- Willie Nelson – The IRS Tapes: Who'll Buy My Memories? (1992) – 2×CD
- Nena – Willst du mit mir gehn (2005) – 2×CD
- Neu! – 2 Originals Of Neu! (1977) – 2×LP compilation reissue
- Neu! – Rock On Brain (1980) – 2×LP compilation
- The New Barbarians – Buried Alive: Live in Maryland (2006) – 2×CD live
- New Order – Substance (1987) – 2×LP, 2×CS, 2×CD
- New Order – Singles (2005) – 2×CD
- Nick Cave and the Bad Seeds – Abattoir Blues/The Lyre of Orpheus (2004) – 2×CD
- The Nice – The Immediate Years (1975) – 2×LP – compilation
- The Nice – The Nice Collection (1985) – 2×LP
- The Nice – The Long Versions (1999)
- The Nice – Hang On To A Dream (2004) – compilation
- The Nice – Everything as Nice as mother makes it: the best of (2006) – compilation
- The Nice – The Essential Collection (2006)
- The Nice – Live at the Fillmore East December 1969 (2009)
- The Nice – Diamond Hard Blue Apples Of The Moon (2010) – compilation
- Nico – Behind The Iron Curtain (1986) – 2×LP
- Nico – The Frozen Borderline 1968–1970 (2007) – 2×CD reissue
- Nightwish – Human. :II: Nature. (2020) – 2×CD
- Nine Inch Nails – The Fragile (1999) – 3×LP, 2×CS, 2×CD
- Nine Inch Nails – And All That Could Have Been (2002) – 2×CD
- Nine Inch Nails – Year Zero (2007) – 3×LP
- Nine Inch Nails – Ghosts I-IV (2008) – 4×LP, 2×CD
- Nits – Urk – Live 1988–1989 (1989) – 3×LP, 2×CD
- Nits – Hits (2000) – plus bonus cd
- Nits – The Nits 1974 (2003) – plus bonus DVD
- Nits – Urk (2006) – plus bonus DVD
- NOFX – 45 or 46 Songs That Weren't Good Enough to Go on Our Other Records (2002) – 2×CD
- Noordkaap – 90/00 Avanti! [+ bonus cd] (2012) – compilation
- The Notorious B.I.G. – Life After Death (1997) – 2×CD
- NRBQ – Transmissions (2004) – 2×CD
- Nucleus – Elastic Rock / We'll Talk About It Later (1994) – 2×CD reissue
- Nucleus – Live in Bremen (2004) – 2×CD
- Nucleus – UK Tour '76 (2007) – 2×CD – live
- Nucleus – Under The Sun / Snakehips Etcetera (2007) – 2×CD reissue
- Nucleus – Labyrinth / Roots (2007) – 2×CD reissue
- Ted Nugent – Double Live Gonzo! (1978)
- Gary Numan – Living Ornaments '81 (1998) – 2×CD
- Laura Nyro – Stoned Soul Picnic: The Best Of Laura Nyro (1997)
- Laura Nyro – The Loom's Desire: Live (2002)

== O ==
- Paul Oakenfold – Creamfields (2004) – 2×CD
- Oasis – Familiar to Millions (2000)
- Mike Oldfield – Incantations (1978) – 2×LP
- Mike Oldfield – Exposed (1979) – 2×LP – live
- Mike Oldfield – Airborn (1980) – 2×LP
- Mike Oldfield – Collection (2002)
- Mike Oldfield – Tres Lunas (2002)
- Mike Oldfield – Light + Shade (2005)
- Mike Oldfield – Tubular Bells II / Tubular Bells III (2008) – 2×CD release
- Mike Oldfield – Tubular Bells: Deluxe edition + bonus dvd (2009)
- Mike Oldfield – Hergest Ridge: Deluxe edition + bonus dvd (2010)
- Mike Oldfield – Ommadawn: Deluxe edition + bonus dvd (2010)
- Mike Oldfield – Incantations + bonus dvd (2011)
- Mike Oldfield – Platinum: Deluxe edition + bonus dvd (2012)
- Mike Oldfield – Two Sides: the very best of Mike Oldfield (2012)
- Mike Oldfield – QE2: Deluxe edition (2012)
- Mike Oldfield – Five Miles Out: Deluxe edition + bonus dvd (2013)
- Mike Oldfield – Crises: Deluxe edition – 30th anniversary [remastered] (2013)
- Mike Oldfield – Man on the Rocks (+ bonus cd) (2014)
- The Olivia Tremor Control – Music from the Unrealized Film Script, Dusk at Cubist Castle (1996)
- Oneida – Each One Teach One (2002)
- Yoko Ono – Fly (1971) – 2×LP
- Yoko Ono – Approximately Infinite Universe (1973) – 2×LP
- Orange Bicycle – Hyacinth Threads: The Morgan Blue Town Recordings (2001) – 2×CD compilation
- The Orb – The Orb's Adventures Beyond the Ultraworld (1991) – 2×CD (debut album)
- The Orb & David Gilmour – Metallic Spheres (2010) + bonus DVD reissue
- Oregon – In Performance (1980) – 2×LP
- Oregon & The Moscow Tchaikovsky Symphony Orchestra – In Moscow (2000)
- Jim O'Rourke – Disengage (1992) – 2×CD
- Osibisa – The Best Of (1990) – 2×CD
- Osibisa – Sunshine Day (1999) – 2×CD
- Osibisa – Black Magic Night : Live at the Royal Festival Hall (2005) – 2×CD
- Ozzy Osbourne – Speak of the Devil (1982) – 2×LP
- Ozzy Osbourne – Tribute (1987) – 2×LP
- Ozzy Osbourne – The Essential Ozzy Osbourne (2003) – 2×CD
- OutKast – Speakerboxxx/The Love Below (2003) – 4×LP, 2×CD
- Out Of Focus – Four Letter Monday Afternoon (1972; 1992; 2009; 2010) – 2×LP, 2×CD

== P ==
- Pacific Gas & Electric – Are You Ready / Pacific Gas & Electric (2012) – 2×CD compilation reissue
- Painkiller – Execution Ground (1994) – 2×CD
- Carl Palmer – Do Ya Wanna Play, Carl? (2014) – 2×CD anthology
- Pandora's Box – Original Sin (1989) – 2×LP (debut album)
- Graham Parker – Vertigo (2002) – studio + live compilation
- Graham Parker & The Rumour – Live at Rockpalast 1978 + 1980 (2012) – reissue
- Parliament – Parliament Live: P-Funk Earth Tour (1977) – 2×LP
- Passport – Spirit of Continuity: The Passport Anthology (1995) – 2×CD
- Pavement – Wowee Zowee (1995) – sesquialbum
- Tom Paxton – The Compleat Tom Paxton (2014) – remastered reissue – live
- Pearl Jam – Lost Dogs (2003) – 2×CD
- Pearls Before Swine – The Wizard Of Is (2007) – 2×CD collection
- Periphery – Juggernaut: Alpha & Juggernaut: Omega (2015)
- Pentangle – Sweet Child (1968) – 2×LP
- Peter, Paul & Mary – In Concert (2) (1989) – 2×CD reissue
- Pet Shop Boys – Alternative (1995) – 2×CD
- Pet Shop Boys – Pop Art: Pet Shop Boys – The Hits (2003) – 2×CD
- Pet Shop Boys – Concrete (2006) – 2×CD
- Tom Petty – Pack Up the Plantation: Live! (1986) – 2×LP
- Shawn Phillips – Perspective (2013) – 2×CD
- Phish – Junta (1989) – 2×CD
- Phish – A Live One (1995) – 2×CD
- Pigface – A New High in Low (1997) – 2×CD
- Pimp C – Pimpalation (2006) – 2×CD (limited edition)
- Richard Pinhas & Merzbow – Keio Line (2009)
- Ariel Pink – Pom Pom (2014) – 2×LP
- Pink Floyd – Ummagumma (1969) – 2×LP – studio/live
- Pink Floyd – A Nice Pair (1974) – 2×LP – reissue
- Pink Floyd – The Wall (1979) – 2×LP – studio
- Pink Floyd – Delicate Sound of Thunder (1988) – 2×LP, 2xcassette, 2×CD – live
- Pink Floyd – Pulse (1995) – 4×LP, 2xcassette, 2×CD – live
- Pink Floyd – Is There Anybody Out There? The Wall Live 1980-81 (2000) – 2×CD – live
- Pink Floyd – Echoes: The Best of Pink Floyd (2001) – 2×CD – compilation
- Pink Floyd – The Endless River (2014) – 2×LP
- Pink Floyd – Cre/ation: The Early Years 1967–1972 (2016) – 2×CD – compilation
- Poco – The Very Best of Poco (1975) – 2×LP
- Poco – The Forgotten Trail – 1969–74 (1990) – 2×CD
- Poco – Pickin' Up The Pieces / Poco (2005) – 2×CD compilation reissue
- The Police – The Police (Deluxe Edition) (2007) – 2×CD
- Polvo – Exploded Drawing (1996) – 2×LP
- Popol Vuh – Revisited & Remixed 1970–1999 (2011) – 2×CD reissue
- Porcupine Tree – Stars Die: The Delerium Years 1991-1997 (2002) – 2×CD
- Porcupine Tree – The Incident (2009) – 2×CD – studio
- Prefab Sprout – Steve McQueen (2007) – 2×CD re-release
- Premiata Forneria Marconi – Stati di immaginazione (2006)
- Premiata Forneria Marconi – 35... e un minuto (2010)
- Prince – 1999 (1982) – 2×LP
- Prince – Sign o' the Times (1987) – 2×LP, 2×CD
- Prince – Graffiti Bridge (1990) – 2×LP
- Prince – Emancipation (1996) – 3×CD
- Prince – Crystal Ball (1997) – 3×CD
- Prince – LOtUSFLOW3R (2009) – 3×CD
- Prins Thomas – Principe del Norte (2016)
- Proto Sun – How Are You Today Sir? (2020) – 2×LP
- Richard Pryor – Wanted: Live in Concert (1978) – 2×LP
- The Psychedelic Furs – Should God Forget: A Retrospective (1997) – 2×CD
- Public Image Ltd – Second Edition (1980) – 2×LP
- Puhdys – Live im Friedrichstadtpalast (1979) – 2×LP
- Puhdys – Live – 25 Jahre die totale Aktion (1994)
- Pure Reason Revolution – The Dark Third (2007)

== Q ==
- Q65 – The complete collection 1966–1969 (1993)
- Q65 – Singles A's & B's (2002)
- Queen – Live Killers (1979)
- Queen – Live at Wembley '86 (1992)
- Queen – Queen on Fire – Live at the Bowl (2004)
- Queen – Queen Rock Montreal (2007)
- Quicksilver Messenger Service – Anthology (1973) – 2×LP
- Quicksilver Messenger Service – Lost Gold and Silver: Unreleased (2000) – live + bonus tracks
- Quintessence – Infinite Love : Live at Queen Elizabeth Hall 1971 (2011)

== R ==
- Raccoo-oo-oon – Raccoo-oo-oon (2008) – 2×LP
- Radiohead – OK Computer (1997) – 2×LP
- Radiohead – In Rainbows (2007) – 2×CD + 2×LP
- Radiohead – A Moon Shaped Pool (2016) – 2×LP
- Radio Massacre International – Frozen North (1995) – 2×CD
- Radio Massacre International – Borrowed Atoms (1998) – 2×CD
- Radio Massacre International – Solid States (2003) – 2×CD
- Radio Massacre International – Emissaries (2005) – 2×CD
- The Ram Jam Band – Foot Stompin' Soul (2006)
- The Ram Jam Band – It's Geno Time (2011)
- Ramones – It's Alive (1979) – 2×LP
- Ramones – Ramones Mania (1988) – 2×LP
- Ramones – Hey Ho! Let's Go: The Anthology (1999) – 2×CD
- Rammstein – Live Aus Berlin (1999) – 2×CD
- Rare Earth – Rare Earth in Concert (1971) – 2×LP
- Rare Earth – The Best of Rare Earth (1995)
- The Rascals – Freedom Suite (1969) – 2×LP
- The Rascals – Peaceful World (1971) – 2×LP
- The Rascals – Anthology: 1965–1972 (1992) – 2×CD
- The Ravens – The Greatest Group Of Them All (1978) – 2×LP compilation reissue
- Redbone – Redbone (1970) – 2×LP
- Red Hot Chili Peppers – Blood Sugar Sex Magik (1991) – 2×LP, 1×CD
- Red Hot Chili Peppers – One Hot Minute (1995) – 2×LP, 1×CD
- Red Hot Chili Peppers – Californication (1999) – 2×LP, 1×CD
- Red Hot Chili Peppers – By The Way (2002) – 2×LP, 1×CD
- Red Hot Chili Peppers – Red Hot Chili Peppers Live in Hyde Park (2004) – 2×CD
- Red Hot Chili Peppers – Stadium Arcadium (2006) – 2×CD
- Red Hot Chili Peppers – I'm with You (2011) – 2×LP, 1×CD
- Lou Reed – Metal Machine Music (1975) – 2×LP
- Lou Reed – Live: Take No Prisoners (1978)
- Lou Reed – The Raven (2003)
- Lou Reed – Animal Serenade (2004)
- Refugee – Affairs in Babylon / Burning from the inside out (2007) – 2×CD remastered
- Terry Reid – Live in London (2012)
- Renaissance – Live at Carnegie Hall (1976)
- REO Speedwagon – Live: You Get What You Play For (1977) – 2×LP
- Buddy Rich – Both Sides (1976) – 2×LP remastered compilation
- Buddy Rich – Three Classic Albums Plus (2012) – 2×CD
- Buddy Rich – Buddy Rich and his buddies (2013) – 2×CD remastered
- Rising Sons – Rising Sons featuring Taj Mahal and Ry Cooder (recorded 1966, released 1992)
- Riverside – Shrine of New Generation Slaves (2013)
- Riverside – Love, Fear and the Time Machine (2015)
- Max Roach & Cecil Taylor – Historic Concerts (1984) – 2×CD – live
- Andy Roberts – Just for the record: the solo anthology 1969–1976 (2005) – 2×CD reissue
- The Ro-D-Ys – The Complete Collection (2003) – 2×CD compilation reissue
- The Ro-D-Ys – Just Fancy / Earnest Vocation (2013) – 2×CD reissue
- Roger Waters – The Wall: Live in Berlin (1990) – 2×CD live
- The Rolling Stones – Hot Rocks 1964-1971 (1971) – 2×LP
- The Rolling Stones – Exile on Main St. (1972)
- The Rolling Stones – More Hot Rocks (Big Hits & Fazed Cookies) (1972)
- The Rolling Stones – Love You Live (1977)
- The Rolling Stones – Forty Licks (2002)
- The Rolling Stones – A Bigger Bang (2005) – 2×LP
- Rotary Connection – Black Gold: The Very Best Of Rotary Connection (2006)
- Roxy Music Live (2003)
- Todd Rundgren – Something/Anything? (1972) – 2×LP
- Todd Rundgren – Todd (1974)
- Todd Rundgren – Back to the Bars (1978) – 2×LP
- Rowwen Hèze – 't Beste van 2 Werelden (1999) – studio + live compilation
- Rowwen Hèze – Dageraad (2003)
- Rowwen Hèze – Zilver (2010)
- Rowwen Hèze – Manne van Staal (2011)
- Rush – All The World's a Stage (1976) – 2×LP
- Rush – Exit...Stage Left (1981) – 2×LP
- Rush – A Show of Hands (1989) – 2×LP
- Rush – Chronicles (1990) – 2×CD
- Rush – Vapor Trails (2002) – 2×LP 1×CD
- Rush – Gold (2003)
- Rush – Snakes & Arrows (2007) – 2×LP 1×CD
- Rush – Snakes & Arrows Live (2008)
- Rush – Retrospective 3 (2009)
- Rush – Clockwork Angels (2012) – 2×LP 1×CD

== S ==
- Sailor – The Epic Singles Collection (2011) – 2×CD compilation reissue
- Sabrina Salerno – Erase/Rewind Official Remix (2008) – 2×CD
- Sallyangie – Children of the Sun (2011) – 2×CD reissue
- Sanctuary Rig – Khnosti (2008) – 2×CD (debut album)
- Santana – Lotus (1975) – 3×LP
- Santana – Moonflower (1977) – 2×LP
- Santana – Live At The Fillmore 1968 (1997) – 2×CD
- Carlos Santana – The Swing of Delight (1980) – 2×LP
- Carlos Santana & Buddy Miles – Welcome / Live! (1988) – 2×LP, 2×CD re-release
- Joe Satriani – Time Machine (1993) – 2×CD
- Joe Satriani – Live in San Francisco (2001) – 2×CD
- Joe Satriani – The Electric Joe Satriani: An Anthology – 2×CD compilation
- Joe Satriani – Live in Tokyo (2005) – 2×CD
- Joe Satriani – I Just Wanna Rock: Live in Paris (2010) – 2×CD
- Joe Satriani – Satchurated: Live in Montreal (2012) – 2×CD
- Savage Republic – Live Trek 1985 - 1986 (1987) – live
- Savoy Brown – The Savoy Brown Collection (1995) – 2×CD compilation
- Savoy Brown – Hellbound Train: Live 1969–1972 (2003) – 2×CD reissue
- Savoy Brown – Train to Nowhere (2013) – 2×CD compilation
- Savoy Brown – Songs from the Road [+ bonus DVD] (2013) – 2×CD
- Say Anything – In Defense of the Genre (2007) – 2×CD
- Boz Scaggs – My Time: a Boz Scaggs Anthology 1969–1997 (1997)
- Boz Scaggs – Greatest Hits: Live (2004)
- Boz Scaggs – The Essential Boz Scaggs (2014)
- Scarface – My Homies (1998)
- Michael Schenker – Temple of Rock: Live in Europe (2012) – 2×CD
- Michael Schenker Group – One Night at Budokan (1981) – 2×LP live
- Michael Schenker Group – Portfolio-The Definitive Collection (1987) – 2×LP
- Michael Schenker Group – Assault Attack / Rock Will Never Die (1996) – 2×CD reissue
- Klaus Schulze – Cyborg (1973) – 2×LP
- Klaus Schulze – X (1978) – 2×LP
- Klaus Schulze – Audentity (1983) – 2×LP
- Klaus Schulze – En=Trance (1988) – 2×LP
- Klaus Schulze – The Dresden Performance (1990) – 2×CD
- Klaus Schulze – The Essential – 1972/93 (1994) – compilation
- Klaus Schulze – Totentag (1994)
- Klaus Schulze – Das Wagner Desaster: Live (1995)
- Klaus Schulze – In Blue (1995)
- Klaus Schulze – Klaus Schulze...Live... (1997)
- Klaus Schulze – Richard Wahnfried's Tonwelle (2012) + bonus CD
- Klaus Schulze – Shadowlands (2013) – limited ed.
- Klaus Schulze & Rainer Bloss – Dziekuje Poland '83 (1983) – live
- Klaus Schulze & Lisa Gerrard – Farscape (2008)
- John Scofield – Out Louder (2007) – studio + live
- John Scofield – In Case The World Changes Its Mind (2012) – live
- John Scofield & Trio Beyond – Saudades (2006)
- Screeching Weasel – Thank You Very Little (1999)
- Seals and Crofts – Seals & Crofts I & II (1974) – 2×LP compilation reissue
- John Sebastian – The Four of Us / Tarzana Kid / Welcome Back / BBC in concert 1970 (2014) – 2×CD reissue + bonus DVD
- Pete Seeger – Pete Seeger singalong: Sanders Theatre, Cambridge, Massachusetts 1980 (1992) – live
- Pete Seeger – A Link In The Chain (1996)
- Pete Seeger – We Shall Overcome (1996) – live
- Pete Seeger – In Prague 1964 (2001) – live
- Pete Seeger – Brothers and Sisters, Vol.1 (2006) 2×CD compilation
- Pete Seeger – Live in '65 (2010)
- Pete Seeger – The complete Bowdoin College concert 1960 (2012)
- Pete Seeger – Pete remembers Woody (2012)
- Bob Seger – Live Bullet (1976) – 2×LP
- Bob Seger – Nine Tonight (1981) – 2×LP
- The Sensational Alex Harvey Band – The Collection (1986) – 2×LP – compilation
- The Sensational Alex Harvey Band – Sahb Stories / Rock Drill (2007) – 2×CD reissue
- The Sensational Alex Harvey Band – The Impossible Dream / Tomorrow Belongs To Me (2007) – 2×CD reissue
- The Sensational Alex Harvey Band – Framed / Next ... (2008) – 2×CD reissue
- The Sensational Alex Harvey Band – Live at the BBC (2009) – 2×CD
- SETI – Pharos (1995) – 2×CD
- Ramses Shaffy – 5 Jaar Hits (1974) – 2×LP
- Ramses Shaffy – Alleen Als Je Me Verleidt (1994) – 2×CD
- Ramses Shaffy – Het Mooiste van Ramses Shaffy (1997)
- Ramses Shaffy – 3 Originals + extra tracks (1998)
- Ramses Shaffy – Shaffy Chantant & Shaffy Chantate (2001)
- Ramses Shaffy – Laat Me (2009)
- Ramses Shaffy & Liesbeth List – Back to Back (2010)
- Tupac Shakur – All Eyez on Me (1996) – 2×CD
- Tupac Shakur – R U Still Down? (Remember Me) (1997) – 2×CD
- Tupac Shakur – Greatest Hits (1998) – 2×CD
- Tupac Shakur – Until the End of Time (2001) – 2×CD
- Tupac Shakur – Better Dayz (2002) – 2×CD
- Sha Na Na – The night is still young: the golden age of rock 'n' roll (2014) – 2×CD reissue
- Ravi Shankar – Golden Jubilee Concert London (1990) – 2×CD
- Ravi Shankar – Festival from India (1996) – 2×CD – live
- Ravi Shankar – Sitar Concertos and other Works (1998)
- Ravi Shankar – Rare and Glorious (2005)
- Ravi Shankar – The Essential Ravi Shankar (2005)
- Ravi Shankar – The Very Best Of (2010)
- Ravi Shankar & Ali Akbar Khan – In Concert 1972 (1996) – 2×CD
- William Shatner – Seeking Major Tom (2011) – 2×CD
- Shihad – Pacifier Live (2003) – 2×LP
- Shiina Ringo – Utaite Myouli (2002) – 2×CD
- Shocking Blue – Singles A's and B's (2005) – 2×CD – compilation
- Show of Hands – Country Life (2003) – 2×CD
- Show of Hands – As You Were (2005) – 2×CD
- Carly Simon – Anthology (2002) – 2×CD
- Simon & Garfunkel – The Concert in Central Park (1982) – 2×LP
- SIDDIOUS – FGHTN' EVRY DMON 2 EVR EXST (2025)
- SIDDIOUS – ALTREG0 (2026)
- Nina Simone – Ne me quitte pas (1971; 1972) – 2×LP
- Nina Simone – A Portrait of Nina Simone (1974) – 2×LP
- Nina Simone – Live in Paris (1974) – 2×LP
- Nina Simone – Lady Midnight (1987) – 2×LP
- Nina Simone – Moon of Alabama (1992) – 2×CD
- Nina Simone – The Masters (1998) – 2×CD
- Nina Simone – Sugar in my Bowl: 1967–1972 (1998) – 2×CD
- Nina Simone – Misunderstood (2000) – 2×CD
- Nina Simone – Emergency Ward / It Is Finished / Black Gold (2002) – 2×CD reissue
- Nina Simone – The Tomato Collection (2002) – 2×CD
- Nina Simone – Nina Simone at Newport, at The Village Gate and elsewhere... (2003) – 2×CD
- Nina Simone – Gold (2004; 2005) – 2×CD reissues
- Nina Simone – Mood Indigo (2004) – 2×CD
- Nina Simone – The Nina Simone collection : A selection of tracks recorded for the Colpix label 1959–1964 (2004) – 2×CD
- Nina Simone – Nina Simone at Carnegie Hall (2005) – 2×CD
- Nina Simone – Tell it like it is : Rarities and unreleased recordings 1967–1973 (2008) – 2×CD
- Nina Simone – Essential Early Recordings (2010) – 2×CD
- Nina Simone – Love Me Or Leave Me (2011) – 2×CD
- Nina Simone – The Complete 1955–1959 (2011) – 2×CD
- Nina Simone – Fine and mellow : Her first recordings 1958–1960 (2012) – 2×CD
- Nina Simone – The ultimate Nina Simone (2012) – 2×CD
- Nina Simone – The complete 1960–1961 (2012) – 2×CD
- Nina Simone – The Nina Simone anthology (2013) – 2×CD
- Frank Sinatra – Sinatra at the Sands (1966) – 2×LP
- Siouxsie and the Banshees – Nocturne (1983) – live
- Simple Minds – Live in the City of Light (1987) – live
- Sir Douglas Quintet – The Collection (1986) – 2×LP
- Sir Douglas Quintet – Sir Doug's Recording Trip (1989) – 2×LP compilation
- Sir Douglas Quintet – The Crazy Cajun Recordings (1999) – 2×CD
- Skin Alley – Bad Words and Evil People: The Transatlantic Anthology 1972–73 (2006) – 2×CD reissue
- Skinny Puppy – Brap: Back and Forth Series 3 & 4 (1996) – 2×CD
- Sky – Sky 2 (1980) – 2×LP
- Sky – Sky Five Live (1983) – 2×LP
- Sky – Squared (1998) – 2×CD
- Sky – Anthology (2004) – 2×CD
- Slayer – Decade of Aggression (1991) – 2×CD
- Memphis Slim – Old Times, New Times (1972) – 2×LP
- Memphis Slim – The Bluesman (1974) – 2×LP
- Memphis Slim – Boogie Woogie (1975?) – 2×LP
- Memphis Slim – Right Now (1975) – 2×LP
- Memphis Slim – Memphis Slim 1940–1960 (2011) – 2×CD compilation
- Memphis Slim & Alexis Korner – Two of the same kind: London sessions [+ bonus tracks] (2012) – 2×CD reissue
- Slipknot – 9.0: Live (2005) – 2×CD
- Sloan – Never Hear The End Of It (2006) – 2×LP
- Sly and the Family Stone – The Woodstock Experience / Stand (2009) – 2×CD live + studio reissue
- Sly and the Family Stone – Stand / There's A Riot Goin' On (2009) – 2×CD reissue
- Sly and the Family Stone – Spaced Cowboy: The Best of Sly and the Family Stone (2009)
- Sly and the Family Stone – The Essential Sly & the Family Stone (2012)
- Small Faces – The Autumn Stone (1969) – 2×LP
- The Smashing Pumpkins – Mellon Collie and the Infinite Sadness (1995) – 3×LP, 2×CD
- The Smashing Pumpkins – Machina II/The Friends & Enemies of Modern Music (2000) – 2×LP + 3×EP
- The Smashing Pumpkins – Siamese Dream (2011) – version w/ bonus DVD
- The Smashing Pumpkins – Gish (2011) – version w/ bonus DVD
- The Smashing Pumpkins – Pisces Iscariot (2012) – version w/ bonus DVD
- Bob Smith – The Visit (1970) – 2×LP
- Patti Smith and Kevin Shields – The Coral Sea (2005/06)
- The Smiths – Louder Than Bombs (1987) – 2×LP
- The Smoke – High in a Room (2002) – compilation
- Snoop Dogg – Bible of Love (2018) – 2×CD – studio
- Soft Machine – Third (1970) – 2×LP
- Soft Machine – Six (1973) – 2×LP
- Soft Machine – The Peel Sessions (1991) – 2×CD reissue
- Soft Machine – Alive & Well: Recorded in Paris (2011) – 2×CD reissue
- Soilwork – The Living Infinite (2013) – 2×LP
- Solaris – Live in Los Angeles (1996)
- Solution – Solution Live (2011) – 2×CD
- Sonic Youth – Daydream Nation (1988) – 2×LP
- Sonic Youth – Washing Machine (1995) – 2×LP
- Sonic Youth – A Thousand Leaves (1998) – 2×LP
- Sonic Youth – SYR4: Goodbye 20th Century (1999) – 2×LP, 2×CD
- Sonic Youth – Sonic Nurse (2004) – 2×LP
- The Sorrows – Take a Heart (2000) – 2×CD reissue
- Soul Whirling Somewhere – Hope Was (1998) – 2×CD
- The Soundtrack of Our Lives – Communion (2009) – 2×CD
- Speed, Glue & Shinki – Speed, Glue & Shinki (1972) – 2×LP
- Spirit – Spirit (1973) – 2×LP
- Spirit – Spirit of '76 (1975) – 2×LP
- Spirit – Time Circle, 1968–1972 (1991) – 2×CD compilation
- Spock's Beard – Snow (2002) – 2×CD
- Spock's Beard – Gluttons for Punishment (2005) – 2×CD
- Bruce Springsteen – The River (1980) – 2×LP
- Bruce Springsteen – Greetings from Asbury Park (NJ); The Wild, the Innocent and the E Street Shuffle (1991) – 2×CD reissue
- Bruce Springsteen – Nebraska; Darkness on the Edge of Town (1992) – 2×CD reissue
- Bruce Springsteen – Before The Fame (2000)
- Bruce Springsteen – Live in New York City (2001)
- Bruce Springsteen – The Essential Bruce Springsteen (2003) – 2×CD compilation
- Bruce Springsteen – Hammersmith Odeon, London '75 (2006)
- Bruce Springsteen – Live in Dublin 2006 (2007)
- Bruce Springsteen – The Promise (2010)
- Bruce Springsteen – Live at the Main Point, 1975 (2011)
- Bruce Springsteen – Live at the Roxy (2015)
- Status Quo (band) – Live! (1977)
- Steamhammer – This is ... Steamhammer (1974) – 2×LP compilation
- Steamhammer – Riding On The L&N – The Anthology (2012) – 2×CD compilation
- Steely dan 1972–78 compilation
- Steppenwolf – Born To Be Wild / Retrospective (1992)
- Steppenwolf – Gold (2005)
- Steppenwolf – Slow Flux / Hour of the Wolf (2013)
- Stereophonics – Live from Dakota (2006) – 2×CD
- Rod Stewart – The Best of Rod Stewart (1976) – 2×LP
- Rod Stewart – The Best of Rod Stewart - Vol. II (1977) – 2×LP
- Rod Stewart – Absolutely Live (1982) – 2×LP
- Rod Stewart – The Mercury Anthology (1992)
- Stephen Stills – 2 Originals of Stephen Stills (1973) – 2×LP
- Stephen Stills & Manassas – Manassas (1972) – 2×LP
- Alan Stivell – Succès (?) – 2×LP
- Alan Stivell – Grands Succès (1975) – 2×LP
- Alan Stivell – Symphonie Celtique (1979) – 2×LP
- Alan Stivell – 70/95 Zoom (1997) – 2×CD compilation
- Alan Stivell – Ar Pep Gwellañ (2012) – 2×CD compilation + bonus CD
- Roine Stolt – Wallstreet Voodoo (2005) – 2×CD
- Stone the Crows – Radio Sessions 1969–1972 (2009) – 2×CD re-release
- Stone the Crows – BBC Sessions 1969–1972 (2014) – 2×LP re-release
- Stone the Crows – Stone the Crows / Ode to John Law (2015) – 2×CD reissue
- Stone the Crows – Teenage Licks / Ontinuous Performance (2015) – 2×CD reissue
- The Stooges – The Stooges (2005) – 2×CD reissue
- The Stooges – Fun House (2005) – 2×CD reissue
- The Strawbs – Preserves Uncanned (1990)
- The Strawbs – Halcyon Days (1997)
- The Strawbs – Live at the BBC, Vol.2: In Concert (2010)
- The Strawbs – 40th Anniversary Celebration; Vol.1 : Strawberry Fayre (2011)
- Stray – Dangerous Games (2001) – 2×CD
- Stray – On the Top of the World (2006) – 2×CD
- Stray – Move It (2007) – 2×CD
- Styx – Caught in the Act (1984)
- Styx – Come Sail Away – The Styx Anthology (2005) – 2×CD
- The Suburbs – Credit in Heaven (1981) – 2×LP
- Sufjan Stevens – Michigan (2003) – 2×LP – studio
- Sufjan Stevens – Illinois (2005) – 2×LP – studio
- Sufjan Stevens – The Age of Adz (2010) – 2×LP – studio
- Donna Summer – Once Upon a Time (1977) – 2×LP
- Donna Summer – Live and More (1978) – 2×LP
- Donna Summer – Bad Girls (1979) – 2×LP
- Donna Summer – On the Radio Vol. I & II (1980) – 2×LP
- Moses Sumney – Græ (2020) – 2×LP – studio
- Sunn O))) – Flight of the Behemoth (2002) – 2×LP
- Sunn O))) – Monoliths and Dimensions (2009) – 2×LP
- Sun Ra – Live from Soundscape (1994) – 2×CD
- Sun Ra – The Singles, 1954–1982 (1997) – 2×CD
- Sun Ra – Black Myth: Out in Space (1998) – 2×CD
- Sun Ra – The Great Lost Sun Ra Albums: Cymbals; Crystal Spears (2000) – 2×CD
- Sun Ra – Media Dreams: Sessions Milan 1979 (2009) – 2×CD
- Sun Ra – Live in Rome (2010) – 2×CD
- Supercharge – Jump! The very best of Albie Donnelly's Supercharge (remastered) (2015) – 2×CD compilation
- Supersister – Supersisterious (2001) – 2×CD live
- Supertramp – Paris (1980) – 2×LP live
- Supertramp – It was the best of times (1999) – 2×CD compilation
- Supertramp – Retrospectacle: the Anthology (2005) – 2×CD compilation reissue
- Supertramp – Breakfast in America (2010) – 2×CD rem. deluxe edition
- Supertramp – Crime of the Century / Crisis? What Crisis? (2011) – 2×CD reissue
- Supertramp – Crime of the Century (2014) – 2×CD deluxe edition
- Swans – Children of God (1987) – 2×LP – studio
- Swans – White Light from the Mouth of Infinity (1991) – 2×LP – studio
- Swans – The Great Annihilator (1995) – 2×LP – studio
- Swans – Soundtracks for the Blind (1996) – 2×CD – studio
- Swans – Swans Are Dead (1998) – 2×CD – live
- Swans – The Seer (2012) – 2×CD – studio
- Swans – To Be Kind (2014) – 2×CD – studio
- Swans – The Glowing Man (2016) – 2×CD – studio
- Swans – The Beggar (2023) – 2×CD – studio
- Taylor Swift – The Tortured Poets Department: The Anthology (2024) – deluxe edition
- David Sylvian – Gone to Earth (1986) – 2×LP
- Symarip – Skinhead Moonstomp : Deluxe Edition (2008)
- Synæsthesia – Desideratum (1995) – 2×CD
- System of a Down – Mezmerize and Hypnotize

== T ==
- Taj Mahal – Take a Giant Step / De Ole Folks at Home (1969) – 2×LP
- Taj Mahal – The Real Thing (1971) – 2×LP
- Taj Mahal – The Collection (1987) – 2×LP
- Taj Mahal – The Essential Taj Mahal (2005) – 2×LP
- Taj Mahal – The hidden treasures of Taj Mahal 1969–1973; Live at The Royal Albert Hall 1970 (2012)
- Taj Mahal – Sing a Happy Song: The Warner Bros. Recordings (2014) – 2×CD
- Taj Mahal – Brothers; Music fuh ya'; Evolution (2015) – 2×CD reissue
- Taj Mahal & The Hula Blues Band – Live at Kauaï (2015)
- Talking Heads – The Name of This Band Is Talking Heads (1982) – 2×LP
- Talking Heads – Sand in the Vaseline: Popular Favorites (1992) – 2×CD
- Tame Impala – Currents (2015) – 2×LP
- Tangerine Dream – Zeit (1972) – 2×LP
- Tangerine Dream – Encore (1977) – 2×LP
- Tangerine Dream – Poland (1984) – 2×LP
- Tangerine Dream – Book of Dreams (1995) – 2×CD compilation
- Tangerine Dream – Rockface (2003) – 2×CD
- Tangerine Dream – Purgatorio (2004) – 2×CD
- Tangerine Dream – Arizona Live (2004) – 2×CD
- Tangerine Dream – Rocking Mars (2005) – 2×CD
- Tanzwut – Schattenreiter (2006) – 2×CD
- Taste – 2 Original LP's ( ? )
- Taste – The Best of Taste (1988) – 2×CD
- Cecil Taylor – In Transition (1975) – 2×LP
- Cecil Taylor – Student Studies (1981) – 2×LP
- Cecil Taylor – Garden (1982) – 2×LP
- Cecil Taylor – One Too Many Salty Swift and Not Goodbye (1991) – 2×CD
- Cecil Taylor, Charles Tolliver, Grachan Moncur & Archie Shepp – The New Breed (1978) – 2×LP – compilation
- TC Matic – Compil Complet ! (2000) – 2×CD – compilation
- Tech N9ne – Killer (2008) – 2×CD
- Television – The Blow Up – Roir Sessions (1990) – 2×CD
- Ten Years After – Recorded Live (1973) – 2×LP
- Ten Years After – Live at the Fillmore East 1970 (2001) – 2×CD
- Ten Years After – Roadworks: Live (2006) – 2×CD
- Sonny Terry – The Blues : Mountain Harmonica 1938–1953 (2005) – 2×CD
- Sonny Terry & Brownie McGhee – Midnight Special (1977) – 2×LP
- Sonny Terry & Brownie McGhee – The Essential Sonny Terry & Brownie McGhee (2009) – 2×CD
- Mikis Theodorakis – 30 Golden Hits (?) – 2×LP
- Mikis Theodorakis – To Axion Esti (1964) – 2×LP
- Mikis Theodorakis – Le Soleil et le Temps (1978) – 2×LP
- Mikis Theodorakis – 3rd Symphony (1982) – 2×LP
- Mikis Theodorakis – On The Screen (1994) – 2×CD
- Mikis Theodorakis – O Zorbas – A Man & his Music (2003) – 2×CD
- Mikis Theodorakis & Pablo Neruda – Canto General (1975) – 2×LP
- The The – 45 RPM (2002)
- They Might Be Giants – Then: The Earlier Years (1997) – 2×CD
- They Might Be Giants – Dial-A-Song: 20 Years Of They Might Be Giants (2002) – 2×CD
- They Might Be Giants – The Else (2007)
- Thin Lizzy – Live and Dangerous (1978) – 2×LP
- Third Ear Band – Hymn to the Sphinx (2001)
- Big Mama Thornton – Stronger Than Dirt / The Way It Is (1988) – 2×LP compilation reissue
- Big Mama Thornton – The Complete 1950–1961 (2013)
- Three Dog Night – Seven Separate Fools / Around the World with Three Dog Night (1972; 2006) – 2×LP; 2×CD re-release
- Three Dog Night – Three Dog Night (1977) – 2×LP compilation
- Three Dog Night – Celebrate: The Three Dog Night Story, 1965–1975 (1993) – 2×CD compilation
- Throbbing Gristle – 20 Jazz Funk Greats (2012) – 2×CD, remastered w/ bonus cd
- Throbbing Gristle – D.o.A : The third and final report of Throbbing Gristle (2012) – 2×CD w/ bonus CD
- Throbbing Gristle – Greatest Hits (2012) – 2×CD reissue
- Throwing Muses – In a Doghouse (1998) – 2×CD
- Justin Timberlake – The 20/20 Experience – 2 of 2 (2013) – 2×CD w/ bonus CD
- Today Is the Day – Sadness Will Prevail (2002) – 2×CD
- Tones on Tail – Everything! (1998) – 2×CD
- Toots & The Maytals – Live in London (1999) – 2×CD
- Toots & The Maytals – Pressure Drop; the Definitive Collection (2005) – 2×CD compilation
- Toots & The Maytals – The Essential Collection (2006) – 2×CD compilation
- Toots & The Maytals – Sweet and Dandy (2008) – 2×CD reissue
- Toots Thielemans – Yesterday & Today (2012) – 2×CD anthology
- Toots Thielemans – The Best of Toots Thielemans (2012) – 2×CD
- Tower of Power – Hipper Than Hip: Yesterday, Today & Tomorrow (2014)
- Pete Townshend – Scoop (1983)
- Pete Townshend – Another Scoop (1986)
- Traffic – On the Road (1973) – 2×LP live
- Traffic – Smiling Phases (1992) – 2×CD compilation
- Traffic – Gold (2005) – 2×CD compilation
- Traffic – John Barleycorn Must Die [remastered] (2011) – 2×CD studio + live reissue
- The Tragically Hip – Yer Favourites (2005) – 2×CD compilation
- Brian Transeau – Ima (1995) – 2×CD
- Transatlantic – Live in America (2001)
- Transatlantic – Live in Europe (2003)
- Transatlantic – The Whirlwind (2009)
- The Troggs – Star Gold (?) – 2×LP compilation
- The Troggs – Archeology 1966–1976 (1993) – 2×CD compilation
- Robin Trower – This Was Now '74–'98 (1999) – compilation
- Robin Trower – RTatRO.08 (2009) – live
- Robin Trower – At The BBC 1973–1975 (2011)
- Robin Trower – State to State : Live Across America 1974–1980 (2013)
- The Tubes – What Do You Want from Live (1978) – 2×LP
- The Tubes – Goin' Down the Tubes (1996) – 2×CD
- Tina Turner – Tina Live in Europe (1988) – 2×CD / 2×LP
- Tina Turner – All The Best (2004) – 2×CD
- The Turtles – Solid Zinc: the Anthology (2003)
- Trumans Water – Spasm Smash XXXOXOX Ox & Ass (1994) – 2×LP
- Shania Twain – Up! (2002) – 2×CD
- Judie Tzuke – Road Noise (1994) – 2×CD live
- Judie Tzuke – Moon on a mirrorball: The definitive collection (2010) – 2×CD compilation

== U ==
- U2 – Rattle and Hum (1988) – 2×LP
- UGK- Underground Kingz (2007) – 2×CD
- Underworld – Second Toughest In The Infants (1996)
- Underworld – Underworld: 1992–2002 (2002) – 2×CD compilation
- Uneven Eleven – Live at Café Oto (2015) – 2×CD
- Unitopia – The Garden (2008) – 2×CD
- Unitopia – Seven Chambers (2023) – 2×CD
- Univers Zéro – Univers Zéro aka 1313 (1977; 2016) – 2×LP re-release
- Unknown Mortal Orchestra – V (2023) – 2×LP – studio
- Unwound – Leaves Turn Inside You (2001) – 2×CD
- Uriah Heep – Uriah Heep Live (1973) – 2×LP
- UFO – Strangers in the Night (1978) – 2×LP

== V ==
- Vampire Weekend – Father of the Bride (album)
- Van der Graaf Generator – Present (2005) – 2×CD
- Van der Graaf Generator – Real Time: Royal Festival Hall, London 06.05.05 (2007) – 2×CD
- Van der Graaf Generator – Recorded Live In Concert At Metropolis Studios, London (2012) – 2×CD
- Van Halen – Live: Right Here, Right Now (1993) – 2×CD
- Van Halen – The Best of Both Worlds (2004) – 2×CD
- Van Halen – Tokyo Dome Live in Concert (2015) – 2×CD
- Van Morrison – Hymns to the Silence (1991) – 2×CD
- Vanilla Fudge – 2 Originals of Vanilla Fudge (1976) – 2×LP reissue
- Various artists – Jesus Christ Superstar (1970)
- Various artists – Woodstock 2 (1971) – 2×LP, 2×CD
- Various artists – The Concert for Bangladesh (1971) – 3×LP, 2×CD
- Various artists – Nuggets: Original Artyfacts from the First Psychedelic Era, 1965-1968 (1972) – 2×LP
- Various artists – Mar y Sol (1972) – 2×LP
- Various artists – Greasy Truckers Party (1972) – 2×LP
- Various artists – American Graffiti (1973) – 2×LP
- Various artists – The 10th American Folk Blues Festival (1972) (1973) – 2×LP
- Various artists – Greasy Truckers Live at Dingwalls Dance Hall (1974) – 2×LP
- Various artists – Saturday Night Fever (1977) 2×LP
- Various artists – Grease (1978) – 2×LP
- Various artists – California Jam 2 (1978) – 2×LP live compilation
- Various artists – Hope & Anchor Front Row Festival (1978) – 2×LP live
- Various artists – Jeff Wayne's Musical Version of The War of the Worlds (1978)
- Various artists – International P.E.A.C.E. Benefit Compilation (1984) – 2×LP and (1997) 2×CD reissue
- Various artists – WAAHNSINN (1986) – 2×LP and (2008) 2×CD reissue – live
- Various artists – Trance Europe Express (1993) – 2×CD
- Various artists – Trance Europe Express 2 (1994) – 2×CD
- Various artists – Trance Europe Express 3 (1994) – 2×CD
- Various artists – 25 Jaar Pinkpop 1970–1994 (1994) – 2×CD
- Various artists – Golden Miles : Australian progressive rock 1969–'74 (1995) – 2×CD
- Various artists – Free to Fight (1995) – 2×LP
- Various artists – Trance Atlantic (1995) – 2×CD
- Various artists – Wasted: The Best of Volume, Part I (1995) – 2×CD
- Various artists – Sharks Patrol These Waters: The Best of Volume, Part II (1995) – 2×CD
- Various artists – Trance Europe Express 4 (1995) – 2×CD
- Various artists – Trance Atlantic 2 (1995) – 2×CD
- Various artists – Acid Flash; vol.1 (1995)
- Various artists – Acid Flash; vol.2–4 (1996)
- Various artists – Message to Love: the Isle of Wight Festival 1970 (1996) – 2×CD
- Various artists – TEXtures (1996) – 2×CD
- Various artists – Trance Europe Express 5 (1996) – 2×CD
- Various artists – Zabriskie Point (1997) – 2×CD reissue w/ outtakes
- Various artists – Acid Flash; vol.6–7 (1997)
- Various artists – Volume Seventeen (1997) – 2×CD
- Various artists – 2001 – A Space Rock Odyssey (2001) – 2×CD
- Various artists – Fields And Streams (2002) – 2×CD
- Various artists – Cargo: a deluxe collection of world & ambient music (2003)
- Various artists – Concert for George (2003)
- Various artists – Mysterious Voyages: A Tribute to Weather Report (2005)
- Various artists – Masters Of Horror Soundtrack (2005) – 2×CD
- Various artists – Krautrock: Music for your Brain (2006) – 6×CD compilation reissue
- Various artists – Anticomp Folkilation (2007) – 2×CD
- Various artists – Dear Mr Fantasy: A Celebration for Jim Capaldi (2007)
- Various artists – Cries from the Midnight Circus: Ladbroke Grove 1967–1978 (2007) – 2×CD compilation
- Various artists – Far, far from Ypres: Songs, poems and music of World War I (2008)
- Various artists – Legends of Woodstock : Spirit of 1969 (2009)
- Various artists – 40 Jaar Pinkpop live NL (2009) – 2×CD
- Various artists – Wondrous Stories. 33 Artists that shaped the Prog Rock Era (2010)
- Various artists – The Sound of Jazz: The Best of Impulse (2011)
- Various artists – Alice in Wonderland & Other Rainy Girls: The Great Lost Southern Popsike Trip (2013) – 2×CD compilation reissue
- Various artists – Deutsche elektronische Musik; vol.1 (2010) – 2×LP, 2×CD compilation
- Various artists – Deutsche elektronische Musik; vol.2: 1971 – 1983 (2013) – 2×CD compilation
- Various artisis – Sing Street: Original Motion Picture Soundtrack (2016) – 2×LP
- Herman van Veen – Liederbuch
- Herman van Veen – Het Verhaal van de Clowns
- Herman van Veen – In Vogelvlucht – 20 Jaar
- Herman van Veen – Het Een en Ander
- Herman van Veen – Overblijven
- Herman van Veen – Carré 3 Amsterdam
- Herman van Veen – Gezongen
- Herman van Veen – Carré Amsterdam
- Herman van Veen – Carré, Amsterdam (1991)
- Herman van Veen – The Collection (1993)
- Herman van Veen – Nu en Dan: 30 Jaar Herman van Veen (1998)
- Herman van Veen – Het Een en Ander (2008)
- Herman van Veen – Lieber Himmel (2013)
- Herman van Veen – Alle 40 Goed (2013)
- Caetano Veloso – Antologia 67/03 (2003)
- Caetano Veloso & Maria Gadú – Multishow ao vivo (2011) – 2×CD live
- The Velvet Underground – 1969: The Velvet Underground Live (1974) – 2×LP
- The Velvet Underground – Live MCMXCIII (1993) – 2×CD
- The Velvet Underground & Nico – The Velvet Underground & Nico (2002) – 2×CD deluxe edition
- Vennaskond – Priima (1999) – 2×CD
- The Ventures – 10th Anniversary Album (1970) – 2×LP
- The Ventures – Only Hits (1973) – 2×LP
- Andreas Vollenweider – The Trilogy (1990) – 2×CD – compilation reissue
- Andreas Vollenweider – The essential Andreas Vollenweider (2000) – 2×CD – compilation
- Andreas Vollenweider & Friends – Live – 1982–1994 (1994)
- Andreas Vollenweider & Friends – 25 Years Live (1982–2007) (2009)
- Cornelis Vreeswijk – Poem, ballader och lite blues (1970) – 2×LP
- Cornelis Vreeswijk – Felicia's svenska suite (1978) – 2×LP
- Cornelis Vreeswijk – Live – Montmartre – Köpenhamn (1979) – 2×LP – live
- Cornelis Vreeswijk – Cornelis sjunger Povel (1981) – 2×LP, 2×CD
- Cornelis Vreeswijk – Cornelis bästa (1985) – 3×LP, 2×CD
- Cornelis Vreeswijk – De Nozem en de Non (2000) – 2×CD reissue
- Cornelis Vreeswijk – Live 1981 (2000) – 2×CD
- Cornelis Vreeswijk – Een Hommage (2002) – 2×CD

== W ==
- Morgan Wallen – Dangerous: The Double Album (2021)
- The Waifs – A Brief History... (2004) – 2×CD
- Rufus Wainwright – Rufus Does Judy at Carnegie Hall (2007) – 2×CD
- Tom Waits – Nighthawks at the Diner (1975) – 2×LP live
- Tom Waits – Rain Dogs / Swordfishtrombones (1992) – 2×CD compilation re-issue
- Rick Wakeman – Rhapsodies (1979) – 2×LP
- Rick Wakeman – An Evening of Yes Music Plus (1994) – 2×CD – live
- Rick Wakeman – Wakeman with Wakeman: the official bootleg (1994) – 2×CD – live
- Rick Wakeman – Greatest Hits (1995) – 2×CD – compilation
- Rick Wakeman – Voyage (1996) – 2×CD
- Rick Wakeman – The Masters (1999) – 2×CD
- Rick Wakeman – The Caped Collection (2000) – 2×CD – compilation
- Rick Wakeman – The Definitive Music of Rick Wakeman (2002) – 2×CD – compilation
- P.T. Walkley – Mr. Macy Walks Alone (2009) – 2×LP
- War – The Black-Man's Burdon (1971) – 2×LP
- Muddy Waters – Fathers and Sons (1969) – 2×LP
- Muddy Waters – McKinley Morganfield (1971) – 2×LP
- Muddy Waters – Rare Live Recordings Vol.2 (1972) – 2×LP
- Muddy Waters – One More Mile / The Original Hoochie Coochie Man (1973) – 2×LP reissue
- Muddy Waters – Experiment in Blues (1973) – 2×LP compilation
- Muddy Waters – Chicago Golden Years 5 (1976) – 2×LP compilation
- Muddy Waters – Chess Masters Vol.2 (1982) – 2LP compilation
- Muddy Waters – Chess Masters Vol.3 (1983) – 2×LP compilation
- Muddy Waters – Chicago Blues Band – Switzerland 1976 (1990) – 2×CD live
- Muddy Waters – Rolling Stone 1941–1950 (2001) – 2×CD compilation
- Muddy Waters – Screamin' and Cryin' (2004) – 2×CD compilation
- Muddy Waters – Hoochie Coochie Man: The Complete Chess Masters Volume 2, 1952–1958 (2004) – 2CD remast. compilation, deluxe edition
- Muddy Waters – The Essence Of Muddy Waters (Featuring 50 Of His Greatest Recordings) (2007) – 2×CD compilation
- Muddy Waters – Gold (2007) – 2×CD remastered compilation
- Muddy Waters – Singing The Blues 1954–1959 (2010) – 2×LP compilation
- Muddy Waters – The Voice & The Guitar Of McKinley Morganfield 1947–1954 (2010) – 2×LP compilation
- Muddy Waters – Hoochie Coochie Man (2011) – 2×LP compilation
- Muddy Waters & Howlin' Wolf – The Gold Collection (1997) – 2×CD compilation
- Roger Waters – The Wall Live in Berlin (1990)
- Roger Waters – In the Flesh Live (2000) – 2×CD
- Roger Waters – Ça Ira (2005) – 2×CD
- Weather Report – Live in Tokyo (1972; 1995) – 2×LP; 2×CD
- Weather Report – 8:30 (1979; 1994) – 2×LP; 2×CD
- Weather Report – Live and Unreleased (2002) – 2×CD re-release
- Weather Report – Live in Berlin 1975 [+ bonus dvd] (2011)
- Weather Report – Live in Offenbach 1978 (2011)
- Weather Report – Live in Cologne 1983 (2011)
- Ween – Paintin' the Town Brown: Ween Live 1990-1998 (1999) – 2×CD
- Scott Weiland – Happy In Galoshes (2008) – 2×CD
- Kanye West – 808's and Heartbreak (2008) – 2×LP
- Leslie West & Mountain – The Man and the Mountain (2013)
- Tony Joe White – Greatest Hits And More (2000) – 2×CD – compilation
- The Whitlams – Little Cloud and the Apple's Eye (2006) – 2×CD
- The Who – Tommy (1969) – 2×LP
- The Who – Quadrophenia (1973) – 2×LP
- The Who – The Kids Are Alright (1979) – 2×LP
- The Who – Live at the Isle of Wight Festival 1970 (1996) – 2×CD
- The Who – Live at Hull (2012)
- Wigwam – Fairyport (1971) – 2×LP
- Wilco – Being There (1996) – 2×CD
- Hank Williams III – Straight to Hell (2006) – 2×CD
- John Williams – Star Wars (1977) – 2×LP
- Mary Lou Williams & Cecil Taylor – Embraced (1978) – 2×LP – live
- Brian Wilson – Live at the Roxy Theatre (2000) – 2×CD
- Steven Wilson – Grace for Drowning (2011) – 2×CD
- Wings – Wings Over America (1976) – 3×LP, 2×CD
- Wings – Wingspan: Hits and History (2001) – 4×LP, 2×CD
- Edgar Winter – Roadwork (1972) – 2×LP
- Johnny Winter – Second Winter (1969) – sesquialbum
- Wire – Document and Eyewitness (1989) – 2×LP
- Wire – Live at The Roxy, London 1977 / Live at CBGB Theatre, New York 1978 (2014)
- Wishbone Ash – Live Dates (1973) – 2×LP
- Wishbone Ash – Live Dates Volume Two (1980) – 2×LP (Early printings. Later on reverted to single LP)
- Howlin' Wolf & Muddy Waters – Howlin' Wolf & Muddy Waters (2001) – 2×CD compilation
- Stevie Wonder – Songs in the Key of Life (1976) – 2×LP + 7"
- Stevie Wonder – Journey through the Secret Life of Plants (1979) – 2×LP
- Stevie Wonder – Original Musiquarium – Vol. I (1982) – 2×LP
- Ronnie Wood – Live and Eclectic (2000) – 2×CD
- Marcel Worms – Red White & Blues: 32 New Dutch Blues (2007)
- Wu-Tang Clan – Wu-Tang Forever (1997) – 2×CD
- Steve Wynn – Here Come the Miracles (2001) – 2×CD – studio

== X ==
- Xiu Xiu – Remixed & Covered (2007) – 2×CD
- XTC – English Settlement (1982) – 2×LP
- XTC – Oranges and Lemons (1989)2 LP, 1 Compact Disc
- XTC Nonsuch (1992) 2 LP, 1 Compact Disc

== Y ==
- Rachael Yamagata – Elephants...Teeth Sinking Into Heart (2008) – 2×CD
- Stomu Yamashta, Steve Winwood, Michael Shrieve, Al Di Meola & Klaus Schulze – The Go Sessions (2005)
- Yes – Tales from Topographic Oceans (1973) – 2×LP
- Yes – Yessongs (1973) – 3×LP, 2×CD
- Yes – Yesshows (1980) – 2×LP
- Yes – Keys to Ascension (1996) – 2×CD
- Yes – Keys to Ascension 2 (1997) – 2×CD
- La Monte Young – The Well-Tuned Piano (1981) – 5×CD
- Neil Young – Journey Through the Past (1972) – 2×LP
- Neil Young – 2 Originals: Neil Young & Everybody Knows This Is Nowhere (1975) – 2×LP reissue
- Neil Young – Decade (1977) – 3×LP, 2×CD
- Neil Young – Storytone (2014) – 2×CD deluxe edition
- Neil Young and Crazy Horse – Live Rust (1979)
- Neil Young and Crazy Horse – Weld (1991) – 2×CD
- Neil Young and Crazy Horse – Year of the Horse (1997) – 2×CD
- Neil Young and Crazy Horse – Live in San Francisco (2009) – 2×CD
- Neil Young and Crazy Horse – Psychedelic Pill (2012) – 2×CD – studio

== Z ==
- Frank Zappa – Zappa in New York (1978)
- Frank Zappa – Sheik Yerbouti (1979)
- Frank Zappa – Joe's Garage (1979) – 3×LP, 2×CD
- Frank Zappa – Tinsel Town Rebellion (1981) – 2×LP
- Frank Zappa – Shut Up 'n Play Yer Guitar (1981) – 3×LP
- Frank Zappa – You Are What You Is (1981) – 2×LP
- Frank Zappa – Thing-Fish (1984)
- Frank Zappa – Guitar (1988)
- Frank Zappa – You Can't Do That on Stage Anymore, Vol. 1 (1988)
- Frank Zappa – You Can't Do That on Stage Anymore, Vol. 2 (1988)
- Frank Zappa – You Can't Do That on Stage Anymore, Vol. 3 (1989)
- Frank Zappa – The Best Band You Never Heard in Your Life (1991)
- Frank Zappa – You Can't Do That on Stage Anymore, Vol. 4 (1991)
- Frank Zappa – Make a Jazz Noise Here (1991)
- Frank Zappa – You Can't Do That on Stage Anymore, Vol. 5 (1992)
- Frank Zappa – You Can't Do That on Stage Anymore, Vol. 6 (1992)
- Frank Zappa – Playground Psychotics (1992)
- Frank Zappa – Civilization, Phaze III (1994)
- Frank Zappa – Strictly Commercial (1995) – 2×LP
- Frank Zappa – The MOFO Project/Object (2006) – 2×CD
- Frank Zappa and The Mothers of Invention – Freak Out! (1966) – 2×LP (debut album)
- Frank Zappa and the Mothers of Invention – Uncle Meat (1969) – 2×LP
- Frank Zappa and the Mothers of Invention – Roxy and Elsewhere (1974) – 2×LP
- John Zorn – Pool (1980) – 2×LP
- John Zorn – Archery (1982) – 2×LP
- John Zorn – Locus Solus (1983) – 2×LP
- John Zorn – Bar Kokhba (1996) – 2×CD
- John Zorn – The Circle Maker (1998) – 2×CD
- John Zorn – Cartoon S/M (2000) – 2×CD
- John Zorn, Bill Laswell & Tatsuya Nakamura – Buck Jam Tonic (2003) – 2×CD
- John Zorn – Sanhedrin 1994-1997 (2005) – 2×CD
- Zayn Malik; – "ROOM UNDER THE STAIRS (Z SIDES)" (2024)
- Zwan – Mary Star of the Sea + bonus DVD (2003)

== See also ==
- List of triple albums
- Lists of albums
