= Only Hits =

Only Hits may refer to:

- Only Hits (The Ventures album) 1973
- Only Hits (2006 Warner Music Group album) compilation on Rhino Records 2006
- Only the Hits, Billie Jo Spears 1981
- Only the Hits The Ventures discography 1992
