= List of triple albums =

The following is a list of triple albums, in which the initial release of the album includes three LP records or compact discs.

Contents

Top – 0–9 and punctuation A B C D E F G H I J K L M N O P Q R S T U V W X Y Z

See also

== A ==
- Aphex Twin – Selected Ambient Works Volume II (1994) – 3×LP, 2×CD

== B ==
- The Band – The Last Waltz (1978)
- Carla Bley – Escalator over the Hill (1971)
- Blu & Exile – Miles (2020) – 3×LP
- Boards of Canada – Geogaddi (2002) – 3×LP
- Boris with Merzbow – Rock Dream – 3×LP, 2×CD
- Zach Bryan – American Heartbreak (2022)

== C ==
- Chamillionaire – Mixtape Messiah
- Cindy Lee – Diamond Jubilee (2024) – 3×LP, 2×CD
- The Clash – Sandinista! (1980) – 3×LP, 2×CD

== D ==
- Anthony de Mare – Liaisons: Re-Imagining Sondheim from the Piano (2015) – 3×CD
- Sasha & John Digweed – Renaissance: The Mix Collection
- The-Dream – Ménage à Trois: Sextape Vol. 1, 2, 3 (2018) – 3×CD
- Dream Theater – Live Scenes from New York (2001)
- Dream Theater – Live at Budokan (2004)
- Dream Theater – Score (2006)
- Bob Dylan – Triplicate (2017)

== E ==
- The Early November – The Mother, the Mechanic, and the Path (2006)
- Electric Light Orchestra – Flashback (2000) – 3×CD – compilation
- Emerson, Lake & Palmer – Welcome Back My Friends to the Show That Never Ends (1974)

== F ==
- Faust – Faust... in Autumn 2005 [+ bonus DVD] (2007)
- Léo Ferré – Ludwig - L'Imaginaire - Le Bateau ivre
- Léo Ferré – Léo Ferré au Théâtre des Champs-Elysées (1984) – 3×LP (live)

== G ==
- Gandalf's Fist – The Clockwork Fable (2016)
- Vince Gill – These Days (2006) – 4×CD
- Godley & Creme – Consequences (1977) – 3×LP (debut album)
- Grateful Dead – Europe '72 (1972)
- Grateful Dead – Rockin' the Rhein with the Grateful Dead (2004)
- Greg Barnett – The Flat White Album (2020)
- Green Day – ¡Uno! ¡Dos! ¡Tré! (2012)

== H ==
- Half Japanese – 1/2 Gentlemen/Not Beasts (1980)
- Masashi Hamauzu – SaGa Frontier 2
- George Harrison – All Things Must Pass (1970)
- George Harrison – The Concert for Bangladesh (album) (1971)

== I ==
- Kenji Ito – SaGa Frontier
- Iron Maiden – The Book of Souls (2015) – 3×LP, 2×CD
- Iron Maiden – Senjutsu (2021) – 3×LP, 2×CD

== K ==
- Kayo Dot – Hubardo
- Hiroki Kikuta – Seiken Densetsu 3
- King Crimson – Heavy ConstruKction (2001)
- The Knife – Shaking the Habitual (2012) – 3×LP, 2×CD

== L ==
- Led Zeppelin – How the West Was Won (2003)

== M ==
- Madness – The Liberty of Norton Folgate (2009) – 3×CD, 1×LP (special edition box set)
- Paul McCartney – Tripping the Live Fantastic (1990)
- The Magnetic Fields – 69 Love Songs (1999)
- MF Grimm – American Hunger (2006)
- Yasunori Mitsuda – Chrono Cross
- Yasunori Mitsuda, et al. – Chrono Trigger
- Metallica – Live Shit: Binge and Purge – 3×CD, 2×DVD
- Elliott Murphy – Strings of the Storm
- Mersiless Amìr – True Legend (2022) – 3×CD

== N ==
- Joanna Newsom – Have One on Me (2010)
- Nine Inch Nails – The Fragile (1999)
- The Nitty Gritty Dirt Band – Will the Circle Be Unbroken (1972)

== O ==
- Oneida – Rated O (2009)

== P ==
- Joel Plaskett – Three (2009)
- Premiata Forneria Marconi – Cook (1974)
- Prince – Emancipation (1996) – 3×CD
- Prurient – Rainbow Mirror (2017)
- Public Image Ltd. – Metal Box (1979)

== R ==
- Rae Sremmurd – SR3MM (2018)
- Steve Roach – Immersion: Three (2007)
- Rush – Different Stages (1998)
- Rush – Rush in Rio (2003)
- Leon Russell – Leon Live

== S ==
- Santana – Lotus (1991)
- Alan Silva and the Celestrial Communication Orchestra – Seasons – 3×LP, 2×CD
- Frank Sinatra – Trilogy: Past Present Future (1980)
- The Smashing Pumpkins – Mellon Collie and the Infinite Sadness (1995) – 3×LP/2×CD
- Spinetta y los Socios del Desierto – Spinetta y Los Socios del desierto (album) (1997) – 3×LP/2×CD
- Stars of the Lid – The Tired Sounds of Stars of the Lid (2001) – 3×LP / 2×CD
- Stars of the Lid – And Their Refinement of the Decline (2007) – 3×LP / 2×CD
- Swallow the Sun – Songs from the North I, II & III (2015)
- Swans – The Seer (2012) – 3×LP / 2×CD
- Swans – To Be Kind (2014) – 3×LP / 2×CD
- Swans – The Glowing Man (2016) – 3×LP / 2×CD
- Swans – Birthing (album) (2025) – 3×LP / 2×CD
- Shayta 146, Jerome Calypso ( German rapduo) – Sympatische Psychopathen (2025) – 3xLP

== T ==
- Therion – Beloved Antichrist (2018)
- Transatlantic – Whirld Tour 2010: Live in London (2010)
- Transatlantic – More Never Is Enough: Live In Manchester & Tilburg 2010 (2011)
- Jeff Tweedy – Twilight Override (2025)

== U ==
- Nobuo Uematsu – Final Fantasy VI

== V ==
- The Violet Burning – The Story of Our Lives

== W ==
- Tom Waits – Orphans: Brawlers, Bawlers & Bastards (2006)
- Kamasi Washington – The Epic (2015)
- Ween – Live at Stubb's (Ween album) (2002) – 3xLP
- Wings – Wings over America (1976)
- The Who – Join Together (1990) – 3×LP
- Woodstock: Music from the Original Soundtrack and More

== Y ==
- Yes – Yessongs (1973) – 3×LP, 2×CD

== Z ==
- Frank Zappa – Joe's Garage (1979)
- Frank Zappa – Shut Up 'n Play Yer Guitar (1981) – 3×CD
- Frank Zappa – Thing-Fish (1984)
- Frank Zappa – Läther (1996) – 3×CD
- Frank Zappa – Funky Nothingness (2023) – 3×CD (discs 2 and 3 contain sessions and unedited masters; also available as a double LP with the album only)
- Zoviet France – Popular Soviet Songs and Youth Music (1985) – 3×CD

== See also ==
- List of double albums
- Lists of albums
