= Almunia =

Almunia is a surname. Notable people with the surname include:

- Eva Almunia (born 1960), Spanish politician
- Joaquín Almunia (born 1948), Spanish politician
- Manuel Almunia (born 1977), Spanish footballer

Almunia is also the name of an Italian electronic music duo.

== See also ==
- Almunia de San Juan, a municipality in the province of Huesca, Aragon, Spain
- La Almunia de Doña Godina, a municipality in the province of Zaragoza, Aragon, Spain
