= Almunia (music duo) =

Italian electronic music duo

Almunia is an Italian electronic dance music duo consisting of Leonardo Ceccanti (guitars, bass guitars, keyboards and vocals) and Gianluca Salvadori (turntables and production). Their debut album New Moon, released in 2011 by British record label Claremont 56, has been described as "nu-disco", "nu-balearic" and "a sweet heady mix of overdubbed disco, guitars and psyched out grooves".

== Discography ==
Albums

- New Moon (Claremont 56, 2011)
- Pulsar (Claremont 56, 2013)

Singles & EPs

- "New Moon" / "Traveler" (12") (Claremont 56, 2011)
- "Pulsar" (12") (Claremont 56, 2012)
- "One Time" (12") (Above Machine, 2013)
- "Cassandras Dream" (digital) (No Static Records, 2013)
- "The Shiny River" (digital) (United Recordings, 2013)
- "Meaning of Time" (10") (Is It Balearic? Recordings, 2013)
- "Xeni" (digital) (Silhouette, 2014)
- "Find My Way" (10") (Above Machine, 2014)
