= The Mo =

Dutch pop band

- Origin: Netherlands
- Genres: New wave, electronic, synthpop
- Years active: 1979–1985
- Past members: Clemens de Lange; Huub de Lange; Heili Helder; Linda Bloemhard; Harm Bieger; Ton van der Meer; Hans Nieuwint; Harm Bieger; Eddie Conard; Willem Ennes

The Mo, also known simply as Mo, was a Dutch pop band best remembered for the 1980s hits "Fred Astaire" and "Cheese." The band was known to be an experimental pop band during the new wave era.

== Biography ==
The Mo was founded in 1979 by brothers Clemens and Huub de Lange.

Their debut album Mo, with Heili Helder on vocals and Harm Bieger on drums, had a remarkable instrumentation; the band used no guitar but other instruments such as a Wurlitzer electric piano, clavinet and bassoon instead.

In February 1981 the album reached the top 10. Successful singles from the album were "Nancy" and "Fred Astaire".

After the original group had broken up in mid 1981, Harm Bieger made a new start, recruiting five new members, including singer Linda Bloemhard. He tried to sustain the original sound of the Mo. Two albums followed (Ha! Ha! The Sound of Laughing and Stop Staring), but failed to make much of an impact, although the song "Cheese" did become a modest hit in dance hall circuits.

The single "Asia" in 1984 became a major hit, but it failed to save the group.

The group disbanded right after the release of their 1984 album Stop Staring.

In 2013 Linda Bloemhard re-recorded "Cheese" with American producer Fernando Perdomo in Los Angeles.

== Members ==
(1979–1981)

- Heili Helder – vocals
- Clemens de Lange – piano, keyboards, bass, synthesizer
- Huub de Lange – organ, keyboards, synthesizer
- Harm Bieger – drums

(1981–1985)

- Linda Bloemhard – vocals
- Ton van der Meer – synthesizer
- Hans Nieuwint – synthesizer
- Harm Bieger – drums
- Eddie Conard – percussion
- Willem Ennes – keyboards, producer

== Discography ==
- Mo (1980, Backdoor)
- Ha! Ha! The Sound of Laughing (1982, Backdoor)
- Stop Staring (1984, Backdoor)
