= Klute (musician) =

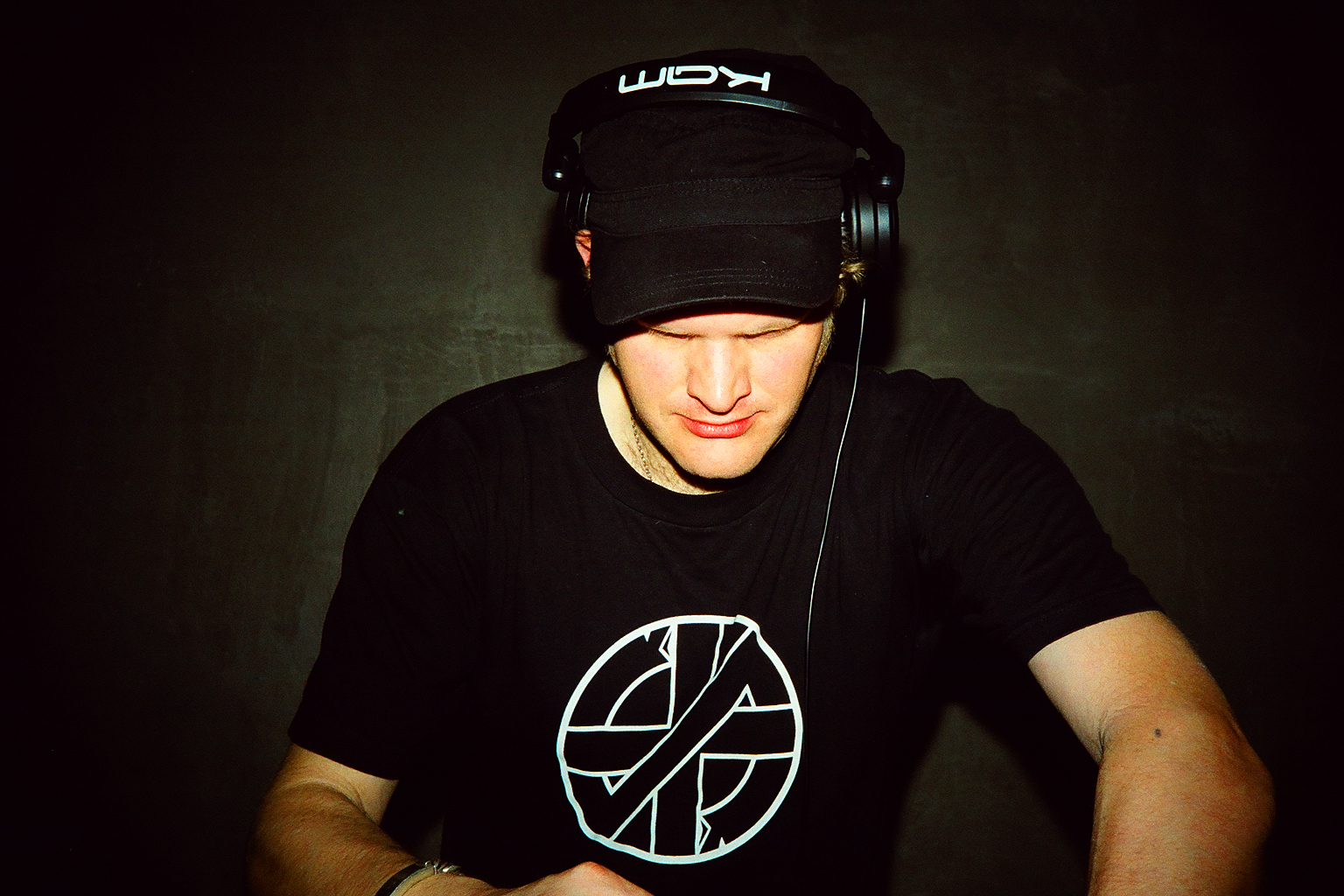
- Klute in Moscow in 2007

Background information
- Born: Thomas Harold George Withers; 31 July 1968 (age 57)
- Origin: Ipswich, England
- Genres: Drum and bass, techno, punk, techstep, neurofunk
- Occupation: Musician
- Years active: 1984–present
- Labels: Commercial Suicide, Certificate 18, 31, Hospital, Shogun Audio, Soul:R, Metalheadz, Breakbeat Science Recordings

Thomas Harold George Withers, known by his recording name Klute, is a drum and bass producer and DJ from Ipswich, UK. He is also the drummer, vocalist and songwriter of the English hardcore band The Stupids.

Klute first turned to electronic production in the early 1990s, experimenting with techno before turning to drum and bass. He released two 12" singles under the 'Override' alias in 1995 and 1996, as well as appearing on Ninja Tune compilations. In 1997 he released the 12" single Deep Control under the alias 'The Spectre'. In 1998 the debut Klute LP Casual Bodies was released on the Certificate 18 imprint; Fear of People followed in 2000.

In 2001 he established the label Commercial Suicide. This released his own material, including the albums Lie, Cheat & Steal (2003), No One's Listening Anymore (2005), The Emperor's New Clothes, (2007) and Music for prophet (2010). All of these albums are double CDs with one drum and bass disc and another of downtempo techno and breakbeat and received widespread acclaim in the electronic music community. The track "Time 4 Change" from No One's Listening Anymore was the last tune played on-air by John Peel.

Commercial Suicide has also released tracks from Break, Digital, Spirit, Calibre, Dom & Roland, Hive, SKC, Gridlok, Jamal, Method One and Chris Su.

As well as releasing music on his own label, Klute has releases on Hospital Records, 31 Records, Soul:R, Shogun Audio, Metalheadz, and Breakbeat Science Recordings.

== Discography ==
=== Albums ===
- Casual Bodies – Certificate 18 (1998)
- Fear of People – Certificate 18 (2000)
- Part of Me – Hospital Records (2002)
- Lie, Cheat & Steal – Commercial Suicide (2003)
- No One's Listening Anymore – Commercial Suicide (2005)
- The Emperor's New Clothes – Commercial Suicide (2007)
- Music For Prophet – Commercial Suicide (2010)
- The Draft – Commercial Suicide (2013)
- Read Between The Lines – Commercial Suicide (2017)
- Whatever It Takes – Commercial Suicide (2019)
