= Sunburst (Loudness album) =

Studio album by Loudness
- Released: December 29, 2021
- Genre: Heavy metal
- Length: 85:13
- Label: Katana, ear
- Producer: Akira Takasaki

Loudness chronology
Rise to Glory (2018)	Sunburst (2021)

Sunburst (我武者羅, Gamushara) is the twenty-eighth studio album by Japanese heavy metal band Loudness. It is their first double album, as well as the first album released on their own label, Katana Music. It was released to commemorate the band's 40th anniversary. It was later released worldwide through earMUSIC on July 29, 2022.

The album came in two editions: A regular edition, and a limited edition that includes a DVD featuring a live performance. It was not released on any digital music stores or streaming services upon launch but was later made available once released internationally.

The album debuted at number 5 on the Oricon weekly albums chart, being their highest-charting album since 1992's Loudness, and at number 11 on the Billboard Japan Hot Albums Chart.

== Track listing ==
All tracks are written by Akira Takasaki, except where noted.

Disc 1
No.	Title	Writer(s)	Length
1.	"Rising Sun" (Instrumental)		2:43
2.	"Oeoeo"		4:15
3.	"大和魂" (Yamato Damashii)		6:03
4.	"仮想現実" (Virtual Reality)		5:18
5.	"Crazy World"		6:28
6.	"Stand or Fall"	Masayoshi Yamashita	6:07
7.	"The Sanzu River"		4:56
8.	"日本の心" (The Heart of Japan)		4:11
Total length:			39:58

Disc 2
No.	Title	Writer(s)	Length
1.	"輝ける80's" (Shining 80's)	Takasaki; Loudness	5:24
2.	"エメラルドの海" (Emerald Ocean)	Takasaki; Loudness	5:28
3.	"天国の扉" (Heaven's Door)	Takasaki; Loudness	5:17
4.	"All Will Be Fine with You"		6:45
5.	"Fire in the Sky"		4:42
6.	"Hunger for More"	Minoru Niihara; Takasaki	3:44
7.	"The Nakigara"	Masayuki Suzuki; Niihara; Takasaki	6:38
8.	"Wonderland"		7:21
Total length:			45:15

All tracks are written by Minoru Niihara and Akira Takasaki, except where noted.

DVD: Loudness 40th Anniversary Special Live Thank You For All -Extra- Golden Era at Ex Theater Roppongi 2020-12-11
No.	Title	Writer(s)	Length
1.	"Loudness"
2.	"Rock Shock (More and More)"
3.	"High Try"
4.	"In the Mirror"
5.	"Milky Way"
6.	"Crazy Doctor"
7.	"Esper"
8.	"Crazy Nights"
9.	"Like Hell"
10.	"Heavy Chains"	Niihara, Yamashita
11.	"So Lonely"
12.	"Road Racer"
13.	"Let It Go"
14.	"Rock 'N' Roll Gypsy"
15.	"Metal Mad"
16.	"Soul on Fire"
17.	"I'm Still Alive"
18.	"S.D.I."

== Charts ==
Chart (2022)	Peak position
Japanese Albums (Oricon)	5
Japanese Hot Albums (Billboard Japan)	11
