= Lie, Cheat & Steal =

Studio album by Klute
- Released: May 19, 2003
- Recorded: UK
- Genre: Drum and bass
- Length: 133:20
- Label: Commercial Suicide
- Producer: Klute

Klute chronology
Fear of People (2000)	Lie, Cheat & Steal (2003)	No One's Listening Anymore (2005)

Professional ratings
Review scores
Source	Rating
AllMusic	4.5/5 stars

Lie, Cheat & Steal (2003) is a double album by drum and bass artist Klute. The second disc is titled You Should Be Ashamed and contains non-drum and bass tracks.

The U.S. version of the album was released via Breakbeat Science Recordings.

== Critical reception ==
CMJ New Music Report wrote that the album keeps Klute's place "amongst the drum 'n' bass elite secure."

== Track listing ==
=== Disc one ===
1. "Now Always Forever" – 6:09
2. "Ambient Hell" – 6:06
3. "Song Seller" – 4:52
4. "Traffico" – 6:00
5. "Problem Reaction" – 6:07
6. "Tacky" – 6:36
7. "Kickin Tha Habit" – 6:41
8. "Candy Ass" – 6:18
9. "Part of Me" – 5:46
10. "Ether" – 5:57
11. "Oshima" – 5:22
12. "Evo Sniffer" – 7:57

=== Disc two ===
1. "Machines Do The Work" – 5:45
2. "Tubby" – 6:11
3. "Ultra Lo" – 5:31
4. "Music for Doubles" – 6:29
5. "Black Flag" – 5:57
6. "2 Lives" – 6:11
7. "Crucial" – 4:10
8. "Overchoice" – 7:07
9. "Artificial Sense" – 5:27
10. "Wishing 4 Better" – 6:41
