= Only Hits (The Ventures album) =

Compilation album by The Ventures
- Released: 1973 / United Artists Records UA-LA147-G2 Stereo
- Genre: Instrumental rock
- Length: 78:52
- Label: United Artists Records
- Producer: Joe Saraceno and The Ventures

The Ventures chronology
Rock and Roll Forever (1972)	Only Hits (1973)	Jim Croce Songbook (1974)

Professional ratings
Review scores
Source	Rating
Allmusic	2/5 stars

Only Hits is an album by The Ventures. It was released as a double LP in 1973. It was also released in Quadraphonic sound on a double 8-track tape set.

== Track listing ==
1. "Also Sprach Zarathustra" – 4:30
2. "Hummingbird/Summerbreeze" – 3:34
3. "Get Down" – 2:31
4. "Soul Makossa" – 3:10
5. "My Love" – 3:27
6. "Cisco Kid" – 3:25
7. "Listen Now!" – Fox, Gimbel 3:37
8. "Oh Babe, What Would You Say" – 3:15
9. "Yesterday Once More" – 3:37
10. "Superstition" – 3:17
11. "Last Tango in Paris" – 2:44
12. "Dueling Banjos" – 1:55
13. "Live and Let Die" – 2:56
14. "The Morning After" – 2:34
15. "Drift Away" – 3:59
16. "Alone Again (Naturally)" – 2:59
17. "I Can See Clearly Now" – 2:46
18. "Finders Keepers" – 2:56
19. "The Twelfth of Never" – 2:29
20. "Frankenstein" – 2:28
21. "The Night the Lights Went Out in Georgia" – 3:12
22. "Are You Man Enough" – 2:52
23. "You Are the Sunshine of My Life" – 2:50
