= Steve Barnard =

Steve "Smiley" Barnard
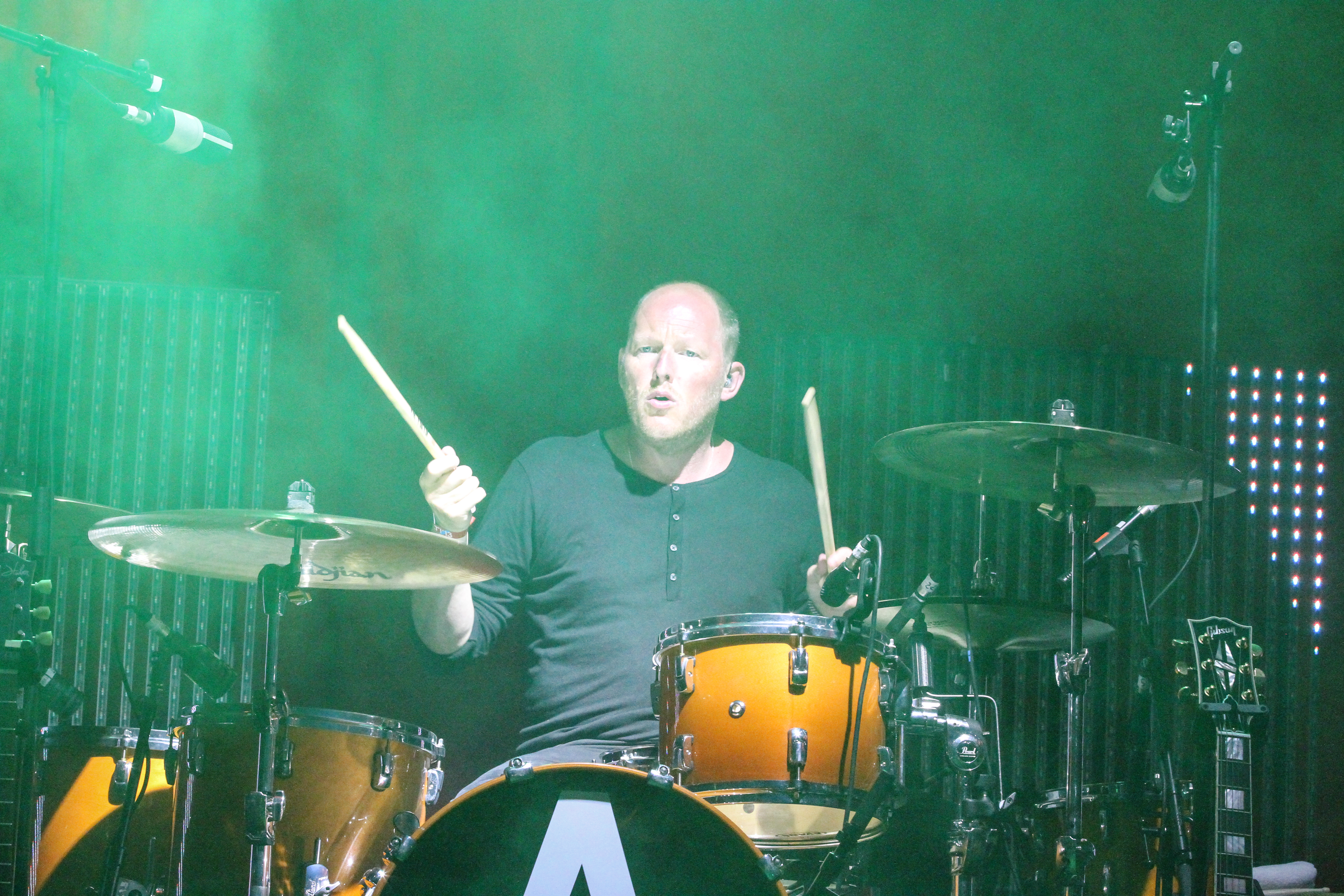
- Barnard playing with Archive in 2013

Background information
- Born: 10 January 1968 (age 57); London, England
- Genres: Rock; electronica
- Occupations: Musician; songwriter; music producer
- Instruments: Drums; bass; guitar; keyboards
- Years active: 1997–present
- Member of: The Alarm; Holy Holy; Archive; The Mock Turtles
- Formerly of: The Mescaleros; From the Jam
- Website: smileysfriends.co.uk

Steve "Smiley" Barnard (born 10 January 1968) is an English musician, songwriter and music producer, best known as a drummer for The Mock Turtles, Robbie Williams, The Mescaleros, Archive, Holy Holy, From the Jam and The Alarm.

== Music career ==
Steve Barnard, also known as Smiley, began playing music at a young age and his first major success as a drummer was in 1997–1998, when he was the drummer for Robbie Williams' solo debut album, single B-sides and tours Life thru a Lens. From 1999, he joined for two years Joe Strummer's newly formed band The Mescaleros. Afterwards, Barnard joined the rock/electronica band Archive, which turned into a long-term collaboration spanning along several albums and film soundtracks. He collaborated with various other bands and musicians, including From the Jam and Gene Loves Jezebel.

In 2010, he played in the band Los Mondo Bongo, formed by Mike Peters to celebrate the music of Joe Strummer and The Mescaleros. Subsequently, he joined Peters' band The Alarm on a full-time basis, another long-term collaboration.

Since the beginning of 2022, Barnard has been playing in the band Holy Holy, performing the music of David Bowie, alongside Tony Visconti and Glenn Gregory, among others.

Barnard is also a music producer at his studio, Sunshine Corner Studios, where he produced several artists and released eight albums of his songs including collaborations with musicians like Bruce Foxton, Steve Norman, Richard Archer, James Stevenson, Ian McNabb.

== Author ==
In 2020, Barnard published the book Clang! Smiley Drops a Few, about his experiences in the music industry.

== Discography ==
Year	Album	Band/Artist	Credits
2023	Forwards	The Alarm	Drums
2022	Peninsular III	Robin Foster	Drums
2022	Omega	The Alarm	Drums
2022	These Four Walls	In The Forest	Drums
2022	Call To Arms & Angels	Archive	Drums
2022	L'Emprise	Mylène Farmer	Drums
2021	History Repeating	The Alarm	Drums, Vocals (background)
2019	Sigma	The Alarm	Drums, Percussion, Vocals (background)
2019	Now Playing	Mark Butcher	Drums
2019	25	Archive	Drums
2018	Equals	The Alarm	Drums
2018	Peninsular II	Robin Foster	Drums
2018	Our Future in Space	Ian McNabb	Drums
2017	Life in Space	Nik Turner	Composer
2016	The False Foundation	Archive	Drums
2015	Restriction	Archive	Drums
2015	Delivery	Hero Fisher	Drums
2014	Axiom	Archive	Drums
2012	Global Lows	Birdpen	Drums
2012	With Us Until You're Dead	Archive	Drums
2010	Bleu noir	Mylène Farmer	Drums
2009	Controlling Crowds	Archive	Drums
2006	Lights	Archive	Drums
2004	Noise	Archive	Drums
2003	Can You Dig It?: The Best of the Mock Turtles	The Mock Turtles	Composer, Drums
2002	You All Look the Same to Me	Archive	Drums
1999	Rock Art and the X-Ray Style	Joe Strummer & The Mescaleros	Drums
1998	The Dream Society	Roy Harper	Drums, Percussion
1997	Life thru a Lens	Robbie Williams	Drums, Vocals (background)
