= Lee Pomeroy =

English musician

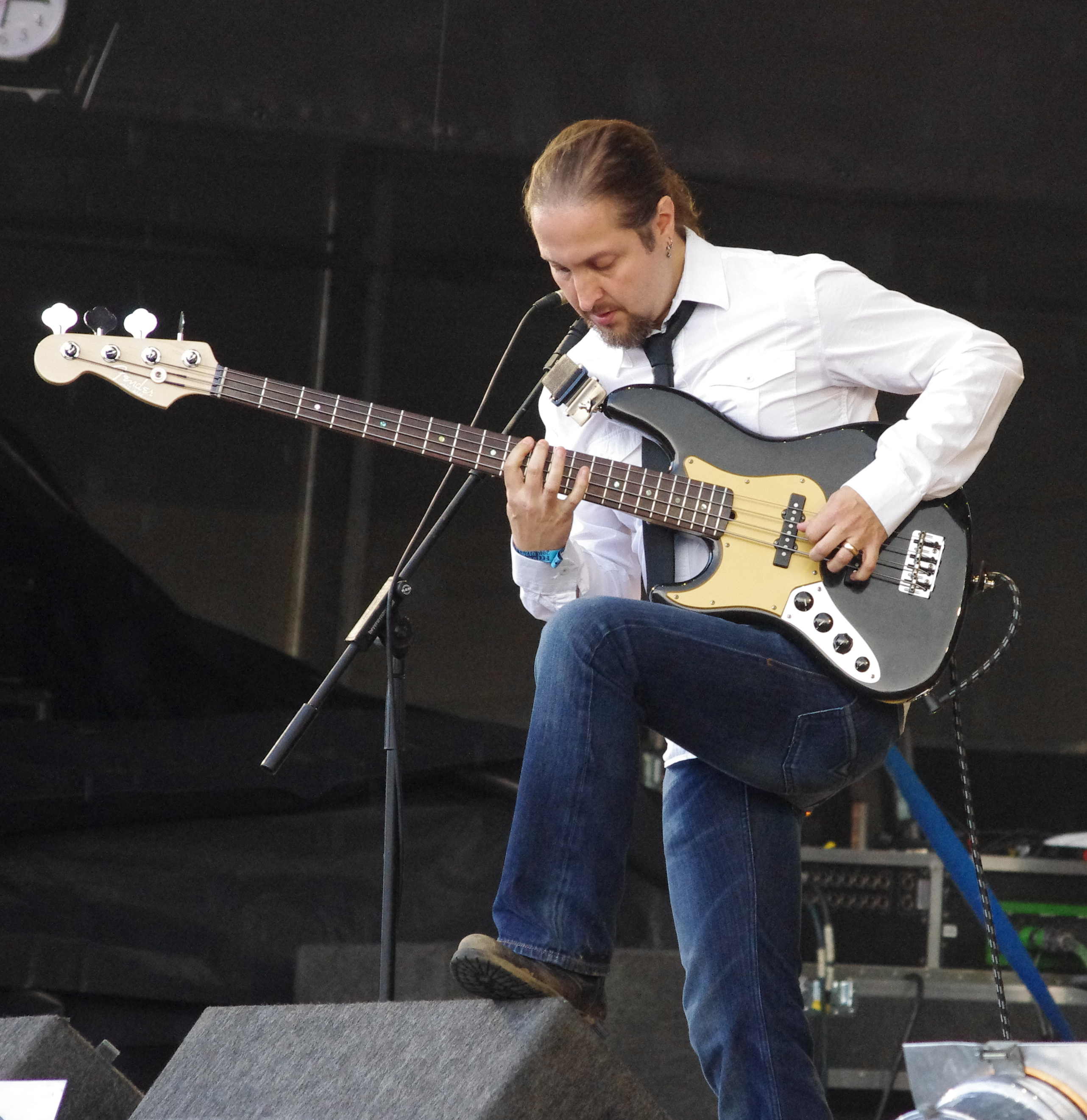
- Lee Pomeroy with The English Rock Ensemble in 2010

Background information
- Born: Hoxton, London
- Origin: East Sussex, England
- Genres: Progressive rock; art rock; progressive metal; pop
- Occupation: Musician
- Instruments: Bass; guitar; vocals; keyboards
- Years active: 1997–present
- Member of: Jeff Lynne's ELO; Take That; Caravan; English Rock Ensemble; Headspace
- Formerly of: Yes Featuring Jon Anderson, Trevor Rabin, Rick Wakeman; It Bites; Archive; Steve Hackett band; Moondigger; This Oceanic Feeling

Lee Pomeroy is an English musician, best known for performing bass guitar and backing vocals with several artists, including Jeff Lynne's ELO, It Bites, Yes Featuring Jon Anderson, Trevor Rabin, Rick Wakeman, Take That, Steve Hackett and Chris Braide. He has also worked with Take That's Gary Barlow as a solo artist. Pomeroy is a member of Rick Wakeman's English Rock Ensemble and the progressive metal band Headspace, founded by Wakeman's son Adam and Damian Wilson.

== Biography ==
Pomeroy's first big break was in the progressive rock band Genaside 2 in 1997. This led to him joining UK prog and electronic group Archive, with which he contributed, bass, guitar and mellotron.

Pomeroy has regularly performed with Rick Wakeman in the English Rock Ensemble. Commonly with guitarist Dave Colquhoun with whom he was also a part of the band Moondigger with Colquhoun on lead vocals and guitar, Pomeroy on bass, keyboards and backing vocals and Michael Bowes on drums and backing vocals.

Pomeroy was recruited by musical director Mike Stevens to be part of the backing band for Take That when they reformed in 2005. Pomeroy played bass alongside Stevens, guitarist Milton McDonald, drummer Donovan Hepburn, and keyboard players Bernie Smith and Marcus Byrne.

Pomeroy joined It Bites in 2006, recording albums with the band including The Tall Ships.

In the early 2000s, Pomeroy and Adam Wakeman (son of Rick Wakeman), who he played with in Rick Wakeman's English Rock Ensemble, discussed forming a band. They were joined by vocalist Damian Wilson, drummer Richard Brook and finally, in 2005, guitarist Pete Rinaldi. The new band, Headspace, had their live debut in 2007, opening for Ozzy Osbourne (in whose backing band Adam Wakeman played). Their debut release was 2007's EP I Am.... Their first studio album, I Am Anonymous, took until 2012 due to conflicting work and family pressures.

Pomeroy performed bass and Chapman Stick on Steve Hackett's 2012 album Genesis Revisited II. Pomeroy then went to perform bass, 12 string double neck, rhythm guitar and backing vocals on the Genesis Revisited tour. Performances at the Hammersmith Apollo and Royal Albert Hall were recorded in the live albums Genesis Revisited: Live at Hammersmith and Royal Albert Hall.

After former ELO members Jeff Lynne and Richard Tandy performed a successful concert at the Children In Need Rocks concert in 2013, with Mike Stevens as musical director, a request for ELO to reform caused Lynne to hire Stevens and the Take That backing band to perform at the BBC Radio 2's Hyde Park festival in 2014 with the BBC Concert Orchestra. Pomeroy has performed bass and backing vocals live with Jeff Lynne's ELO since 2014 including both of their tours.

Pomeroy was also a member of the pop group This Oceanic Feeling collaborators Chris Braide (vocals, keyboards, guitars) and Ash Soan (drums), they release one album called Universal Mind which featured him on bass, chapman stick and guitar.

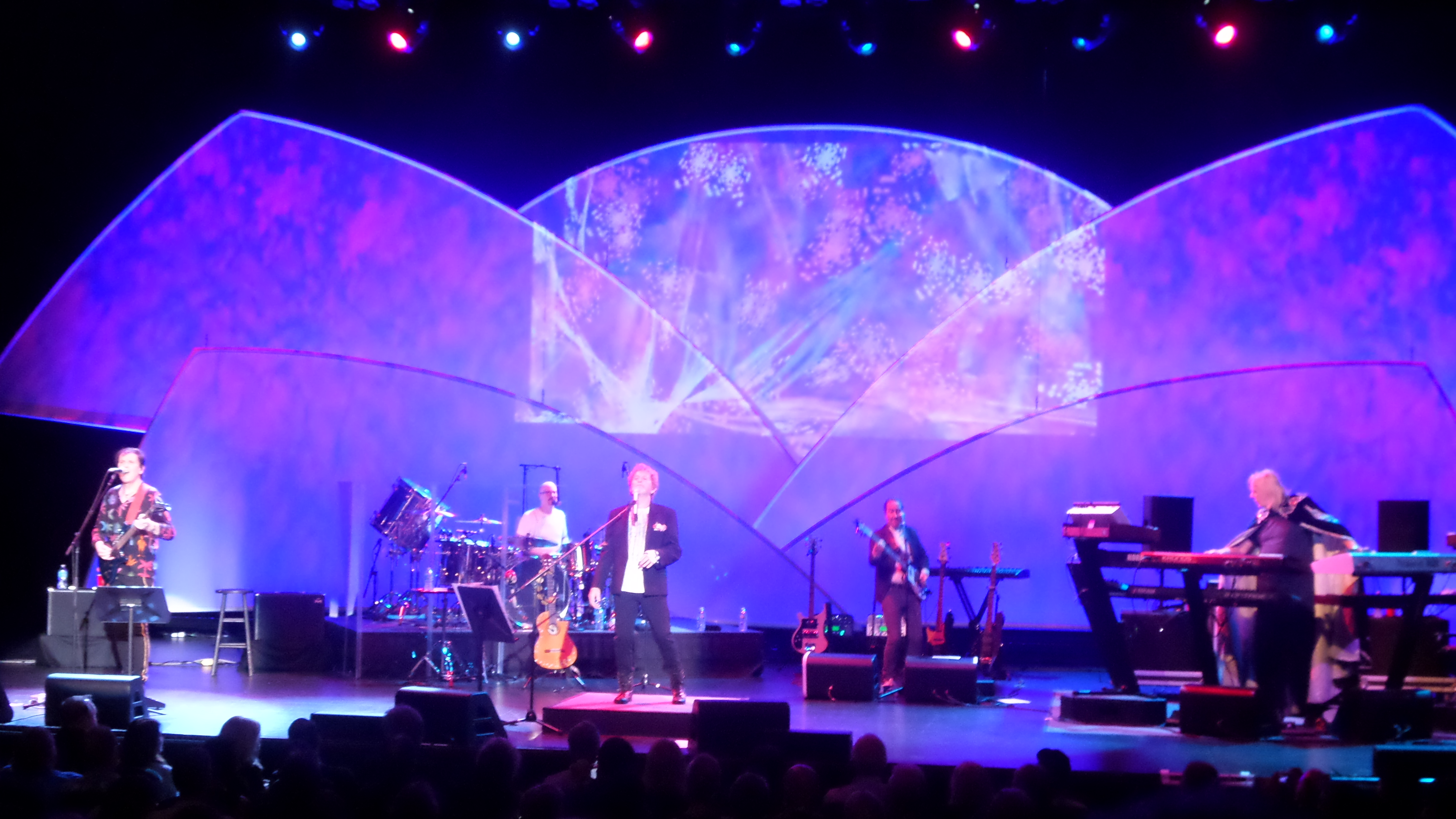
Pomeroy (second from right) performing with Yes ft. ARW.

Alongside Rick Wakeman, Pomeroy performed with Yes featuring Anderson, Rabin & Wakeman on bass guitar and backing vocals. Pomeroy played with ARW on both of their tours (except on the 2017 Japanese and 2018 European legs, where he was deputised by fellow Jeff Lynne's ELO touring member and 10cc singer Iain Hornal).

In 2022, Pomeroy joined Canterbury based progressive rock band Caravan after playing as a guest bass player on their 2021 album It’s None of Your Business.

Pomeroy performed bass/vocals on the English Rock Ensemble spring 2022 tour with Hayley Sanderson on vocals, Dave Colquhoun on guitars, backing vocals, and Rick and Adam Wakeman (keyboards).

== Style ==
Pomeroy is primarily known as a bass guitarist, but also plays Chapman Stick, bass pedals, synth bass, double neck guitar / bass (with Steve Hackett), rhythm guitar and even the spoons. Pomeroy performs bass guitar left-handed with left-handed instruments but stringed as a right-handed instrument. Regarding learning to play, he said, "My brother had a bass guitar, and I used to pick it up and have a thrash around on it when he was at work.... I know this sounds weird - I didn’t actually learn it as such, because I could play the bass as soon as I picked it up. I never had to work out how to play it, or even how to hold it, even though it was upside-down because I’m left-handed.” He has described Yes bassist Chris Squire as his hero, and compares his sound to Squire, Geddy Lee and Paul McCartney. He uses various equipment including:

- 1965, 73 & 77 Fender Jazz basses
- Rickenbacker 4003
- 1980 Musicman Stingray
- Fender Precision
- Musicman Stingray 5 string
- Chapman Stick
- Taylor Acoustic Mini bass
- Shergold Double Neck Bass / Guitar
- Moog Taurus 1 bass pedals
- Mellotron
- Line 6 Variax 300

== Discography ==
Credits based on Discogs and AllMusic.

=== Solo Releases ===
- 2001 – Ambient Collectio'n – With Various
- 2002 – funk – With Warren Bennett, John Cameron and Steve Emney
- 2007 – Sold Out – With Martin Price

=== With Rick Wakeman ===
- 2001 – Live From Buenos Aires – With the English Rock Ensemble
- 2001 – Out of the Blue – With the New English Rock Ensemble (bass)
- 2003 – Out There – With the New English Rock Ensemble (bass)
- 2005 – Made in Cuba (bass)
- 2006 – Retro (bass)
- 2007 – Retro 2 (bass, bass pedals)
- 2012 – Journey to the Centre of the Earth (bass; 2012 re-recording)
- 2012 – In the Nick of Time: Live in 2003 – With the English Rock Ensemble (bass)
- 2020 - The Red Planet

=== With Archive ===
- 1999 – Take My Head (guitar, bass guitar)
- 2002 – You All Look the Same to Me (bass)
- 2003 – Michel Vaillant (Bande Originale du Film) (bass)
- 2004 – Noise
- 2006 – Lights (bass, mellotron)
- 2006 – System (bass)
- 2009 – Controlling Crowds Part IV (mellotron)

=== With Take That ===
- 2006 – "The Ultimate Tour" [Video] (bass guitar)
- 2007 – "I'd Wait For Life" [Single] (bass guitar on live tracks)
- 2007 – "Reach Out" [Single] (bass guitar on live tracks)
- 2008 – Beautiful World Live (vocals, bass guitar)
- 2009 – The Greatest Day – Take That Present: The Circus Live (bass guitar, keyboards, backing Vocals)
- 2009 – "Said It All" [Single] (bass guitar on live tracks)
- 2011 – Progress Live (vocals, bass)
- 2015 – Live 2015 (bass guitar)
- 2019 – Odyssey - Greatest Hits Live (bass guitar, vocals)
- 2019 – "Relight My Fire (Live)" – Featuring Lulu [Single] (bass guitar)
- 2019 – "Cry" [Single] (bass guitar)

=== With Headspace/Damian Wilson ===
- 2007 – I Am/... – [EP] Headspace (bass)
- 2012 – I Am Anonymous – Headspace (bass, chapman stick)
- 2016 – Built for Fighting – Damian Wilson (bass)
- 2016 – All That You Fear Is Gone – Headspace (bass, backing vocals)
- 2021 – Limehouse to Lechlade – Damian Wilson (bass)

=== With Steve Hackett ===
- 2010 – Out of the Tunnel's Mouth (bass)
- 2012 – Genesis Revisited II (bass, chapman stick)
- 2013 – Genesis Revisited: Live at Hammersmith (bass, vocals, 12 string guitar, bass pedals)
- 2014 – Genesis Revisited: Live at the Royal Albert Hall (bass, vocals, 12 string guitar, bass pedals)

=== With Others ===
- 1997 – Икра – Мумий Тролль (Bass)
- 1998 – Come As You Are [Single] – The King (Bass)
- 1998 – Gravelands – The King (Bass)
- 1998 – Flotation Toy Warning – Intravene (Appearance)
- 1999 – Ad Finite – Genaside II (Band Member)
- 1999 – Another Sleepless Night – Jina (Bass)
- 2000 – Here We Go [Single] – Moonbaby (Bass)
- 2001 – A Tribute to Yes [Purple Pyramid] – Various (Bass)
- 2001 – Progressive Rock Anthems [St. Clair] – Various (Bass)
- 2001 – Progressive Rock Classics – Various (Bass)
- 2001 – Progressive Rock Epics – Various (Bass)
- 2001 – Every Song You Make, Vol. 1: Sting/Police Tribute - Various (Bass Guitar)
- 2004 – Finding Neverland [Original Motion Picture Soundtrack] - Jan A.P Kaczmarek (Bass)
- 2008 – The Tall Ships – It Bites (Bass)
- 2009 – Piano Adagio – Various (Composition)
- 2010 – Smile – Voice In a Million (Bass)
- 2010 – Calling All the Heroes [Single] – It Bites (Bass, Backing Vocals)
- 2011 – It Happened One Night – It Bites (Bass)
- 2012 – Map of the Past – It Bites (Bass Guitar, Band Member)
- 2012 – Live in London – Terry Reid (Bass)
- 2013 – Nocturnal – Yuna (Bass)
- 2014 – Dreaming Of England – Downes Braide Association (Bass Guitar)
- 2015 – Suburban Ghosts – Downes Braide Association (Bass Guitar)
- 2015 – Universal Mind – This Oceanic Feeling (Producer, Electric Guitar, 5 String Bass, Bass, Chapmans Stick)
- 2015 – Jeff Lynne's ELO: Live in Hyde Park – Jeff Lynne's ELO (Bass, Vocals)
- 2017 – Wembley or Bust – Jeff Lynne's ELO (Backing Vocals, Bass)
- 2018 – 50th Anniversary: Live at the Apollo – Yes Featuring Jon Anderson, Trevor Rabin, Rick Wakeman (Bass Guitar, Backing Vocals)
- 2020 – In The Year 3073-Book II – Projekt Gemineye (Bass Guitar)
- 2021 – It's None Of Your Business – Caravan (guest bass)
- 2021 – A Silent War – SRMeixner (Sounds)
- 2021 –The Reality Of Zeros And Ones – Darby Todd (Bass)
