= Roya Arab =

Iranian-British musician

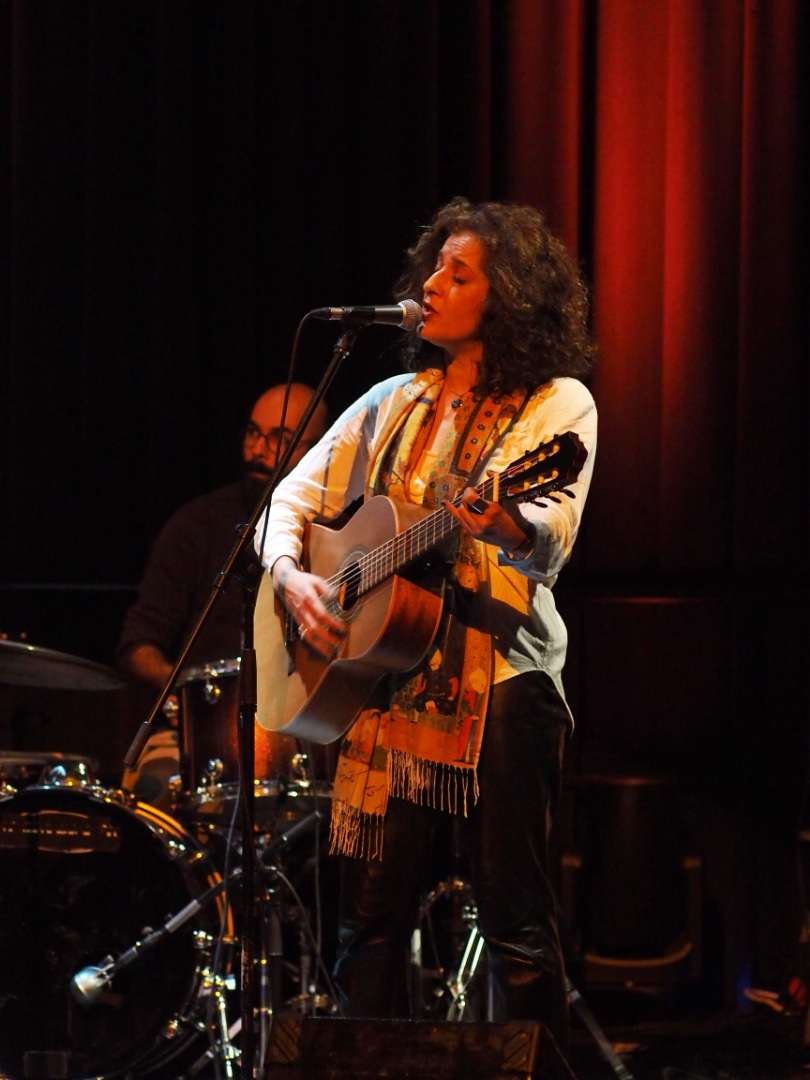

Background information
- Born: 1967 (age 58–59); Tehran, Imperial State of Iran
- Occupations: Musician, archaeologist, curator
- Instruments: Vocals, piano, guitar
- Years active: 1994–present
- Website: http://www.royaarab.com/

Roya Arab (born 1967) is an Iranian-British musician and archaeologist. Born in Tehran, she is an exile of the Iranian Revolution.

== Early life and education ==
Roya Arab was born in Tehran, Iran. She attended Maktabe Tarbiat school in Tehran, while also studying at summer schools in Montana, Switzerland, and St George's School, Ascot.

After the 1979 Iranian Revolution, she boarded at Ancaster House School in Bexhill-on-Sea in England, before taking her A-levels at North Westminster Community School in London. She then completed one year of a copywriting/advertising course.

She joined the Institute of Archaeology (University College London) in 2000 to complete an Archaeology BA and Public Archaeology MA and remained as an Honorary Research Associate from 2008 until 2015. She is undertaking research into music in Iranian films and what it reveals about society’s attitudes toward music and musicianship. Between 2020-2025 she was an Associate Member at LMEI CIS SOAS.

Feb 2026 Roya Arab was appointed Chevalier de l’Ordre des Arts et des Lettres by French Ambassador Hélène Tréheux-Duchêne.

== Musical career ==
Arab learned the craft of singing during jam sessions around London in the early and mid-1990s. She was the first Iranian woman to receive a publishing and recording deal from a major Western label, when she was signed as a member of Archive to Island Records in 1994, and the album Londinium was released in 1996. The band broke up shortly after. Arab went on to work with various artists, including Leila in Like Weather, Grooverider in Mysteries of Funk, followed by some work in Paris with Zend Avesta and Naab, before working on a project with Mike Figgis. Courtesy of Choice (2000) by Leila was the last album Arab appeared on before a hiatus to study archaeology.

In 2008, Arab sang on Blood, Looms and Blooms, before joining Leila on a European tour in 2009. Arab started working with young Iranian musicians leaving Iran including Hichkas and Ash Koosha, and performing live again. In 2011, the live recording of ‘Killing fields’ with Hichkas was made available to the public. ‘Mooye Parishoon’ was released in 2013 for raising awareness of domestic violence and abuse. She appeared on Rosko John 's debut solo album Call to Arms. Arab started collaborating with Arshid Azarine in 2018 and recorded a song for his 2019 album. A collaboration with Rone appeared in 2021.

== Archaeological archiving and socio-political commentary ==
During and after Arab's studies in public archaeology at the UCL she has catalogued historical documents including the Wertime Collection and the Campbell archives.

Arab promotes the cultures of the MENA region with a special interest in Iran. She has worked with organisations and festivals such as Nour (RBKC) and the London Middle East Institute at SOAS, University of London to curate cultural and educational events celebrating the heritage of Middle East and North Africa. In 2019, Arab co-edited an issue of The Middle East in London covering Iranian cinema.

== Selected discography ==
- 1996: Archive, Londinium (Island Records): "All Time", "So Few Words", "Ubiquitous Wife" (a.k.a. "Headspace"), "Darkroom", "Londinium", "Nothing Else", "Parvaneh (Butterfly)", "Last Five", "Ubiquitous Wife Remix" (hidden song)
- 1998 & 2020: Leila, Like Weather: "Blue Grace" (R. Arab, L. Arab)
- 1998: Grooverider, Mysteries of Funk: "Rainbows of Colour" (Roya Arab, Grooverider, Optical)
- 1999: Naab, L’étranger: "L’étranger" (R. Arab, Naab)
- 2000 & 2020: Zend Avesta, Organique: "À la Manière" (Roya Arab, Rebotini)
- 2000: Leila, Courtesy of Choice: "Different time" (R. Arab, L. Arab, G. Jones, Woolley)
- 2008: Leila, Blood, Looms and Blooms: "Daisies, Cats and Spacemen" (R. Arab, L. Arab)
- 2011: R. Arab & Hichkas, "Killing Fields" live (R.Arab & Hichkas)
- 2012: Rosko John, "Tactical light" (Rosko John and R.Arab)
- 2013: Funkshy, Think before you do: “Funkshy’ (T.Omar & R.Arab)
- 2013: Hichkas, R. Arab & Dariush "Mooye Parishoon" (Hichkas, R. Arab, Dariush & Mahdyar Aghajani)
- 2014: R. Arab, "Siren's call" film score for Hinterland, a short film by Sebastian Lister
- 2014: Rosko John, Call to Arms: "March Forth" (Rosko John, R. Arab & M. Aghajani)
- 2019: Arshid Azarine, Sing me a Song “Hidden Hell” (R.Arab & A.Azarine)
- 2021: Faubourg, Rith Banney and Roya Arab ''Lost''
- 2021: Rone, Rone & Friends, “Twenty 20” (Rone, R.Arab)

== Selected publications ==
- Arab. R & Rehren.Th 2004. "The pyrotechnological expedition of 1968". In: Th. Stöllner, R. Slotta and A. Vatandoust, eds), Persiens Antike Pracht, Bergbau Handwerk Archäogie, Deutsches Bergbau-Museum, Bochum: 550–555.
- Arab, R. & Rehren, Th. 2004. ‘The Wertime Pyrotechnological Expedition of 1968’, IAMS, Vol 24: 29–34.
- Arab, R. 2005. Student Guide Book for IHF educational programme in conjunction with the British Museum exhibition British Museum with Achaemenid assistance from S. Razmjou, edited by F. Hakimzadeh & R. Dwyer.
- Arab, R. 2009. "Comments and Reflections on ‘Archaeology in Conflict: Cultural heritage, site management and sustainable developments in conflict and post- conflict states in the Middle East" in www.wikiarc.org
- Arab, R. 2010. "Open letter on Iranian heritage". Public Archaeology, Vol 9, No 2: 108–120.
- Arab, R. & N. Earl. 2011. "Persians, Classics and Secondary Education", The Journal of Classics Teaching, no. 24, Autumn 2011: 11–14.
- Arab, R. 2013, "Terror and I", 23 July 2013 in www.mediadiversified.org.
- Arab, R. 2014. "Campbell, John Nicholl Robert ii. The Archives", Encyclopædia Iranica.
- Arab, R. 2015. "Review and reflections on Culture in Crisis Conference V&A April 2015". 20 May 2015 in www.wikiarc.org
- Arab, R. 2015. "Can Composition and Performance be Research?" 25 November 2015. City University Blogspot.
- Arab, R. 2016. "Swaying to Persian and Middle Eastern tunes in London", The Middle East in London. Vol 12, No 2, February/March 2016: 19–20.
- Arab, R. 2016. "The changing use of music in Iranian films reflects a complex culture in flux". 30 April 2016 in www.mediadiversified.org.
- Arab, R. 2017. “How Men Became the Sole Adult Dancing Singers in Iranian Films” in Music on Screen: From Cinema Screens to Touchscreens. Musicology Research (online) Autumn 2017, Vol. 3.
- Arab, R. 2019. “Parviz Sayyad: Socio-political commentator dressed as village fool” in The Middle East in London. Volume 15 – Number 2 February–March 2019

=== Reports ===
- 2009. "Review and reflections on: Is the kingdom of Saudi Arabia prepared to defend Human Rights, Civil Liberties and Fight Terrorism". A Conference by Society Outreach, House of Lords, 7 December 2009.
- 2009. "A report of the seminar for National Interfaith week" at the Zoroastrian Centre in London (ZTFE), 18 November 2009.
- 2010. "An overview of ‘State terrorism and Libya’s record on human rights: fact of fiction? A Conference by Society Outreach", House of Lords, 27 January 2010.

== See also ==
- List of Iranian women musicians
