= Kweku Aacht =

British Ghanaian singer-songwriter, composer, musician and dancer

- Also known as: Awotwi
- Genres: Electronic Dance Music; Soul; Jazz
- Occupations: Singer-songwriter; Producer; Composer; Musician; choreographer; Dancer
- Instruments: Vocals.; Piano; Pro audio equipment
- Years active: 1998–present

Kweku Aacht, known by his stage name Awotwi, is a British Ghanaian singer-songwriter, composer, musician and dancer. He is known as a vocalist in his collaborations with experimental electronic artistes and for creating cutting edge dance theatre soundtracks and performances.

== Music and performance career ==
Aacht was influenced in the early 1990s by his time spent on the UK's underground club scene, at outdoor raves and music festivals. During this era, Aacht soaked up the eclectic sounds of the UK underground. He encountered artistes such as the Prodigy, Darren Emerson, Björk and Tricky.

In 1999, Aacht began his work as recording artist, when he co-wrote and performed on two songs on Zan Lyons debut album Desolate and was also featured on Damian Lazarus' Mind Horizon Records compilation Different Noise.

While studying at London College of Fashion, Aacht moved to Hackney, the center of London's vibrant art scene. Here he socialised and collaborated with a range of fine artists from the movement dubbed the Y.B.As (Young British Artists) by the press, creating sound installations and performing music in art spaces and galleries. In 2004, he collaborated with electronica artist Leila Arab in her performance at the V&A museum, which was later featured on her album Blood Looms and Blooms.

In 2002, Aacht's dance career came to a crashing halt when he experienced a serious muscular skeletal injury. He was unable to dance for over three years. During this period, he focused on one of his other passions social development, leading on art-based programs, designed and to support the growth, empowerment and transformation of young people and of disadvantaged communities. His work with leading some of the UKs leading community development specialists includes co-designing a national program tackling conflict in community tension areas for The Tutu Foundation UK.

2006 marked Aacht's return to making music. Aacht attended a dance performance at East London's Stratford Circus featuring a performance from now leading contemporary dance company C-12 Dance Theatre. A meeting with C-12 following the performance led to a long-term collaborative relationship and sparked the beginning of his career as composer and musical director for innovative dance theatre productions. Two years later, Aacht himself returned to the stage performing in a series of self-choreographed pieces re-igniting his dance career. Over the next five years, Aacht developed his hybrid of music production and dance performance, gaining popularity within the UKs hip-hop and contemporary dance communities. In 2013, Aacht moved to Ghana.

== Kindred Tribe ==
In 2012, Aacht embarked on is first music performance project since mid 2000s. He joined forces with leading African Contemporary dance artist and Vocab Dance Company director Alesandra Seutin and dancer/actress and singer Nandi Bhebhe. Together they formed the dance collective produced by Aacht drawing upon the trio's eclectic influences to create a dynamic and unique dance act. Kindred Tribe wrote a number of songs and traveled to Ghana to perform at the Asa Baako festival.

== Productions ==
Project	Client	Description	Date
Condition:Humanoid	Two Son's and a Ton of Man Theatre Company	Score composition	1999
Desolate	Zan Lyons/ Foundry Records	Lyricist and vocalist on 2 album tracks	2000
A different Noise	Mind Horizon Recordings	Featured compilation track	2000
Visions and Aspirations Shoreditch Electricity Showrooms	Gloria Muikira	Sound installation for photographic exhibition	2000
Spring Heeled Jack Sessions at the Strong Rooms	Spring Heeled jack	Song writing and composition, vocal sessions	2001
Playgroup	Output Records	Song writing and composition, vocal sessions	2002
One Night Only Islington College	C-12 Dance Theatre	Remixes, narrator voice-over recordings and special effects for contemporary dance performance	2007
Resolution! The Place	C-12 Dance Theatre	Remix for contemporary dance performance	2008
Two's a Company Stratford Circus	C-12 Dance Theatre	Remix for contemporary dance performance	2008
Fast 4wrd Hackney Museum	Deep:Black	Electronic sound installation for public exhibition	2008
Big Dance Holland Park and Potters Field Park	C-12 Dance Theatre	2 musical compositions for outdoor, site specific contemporary dance performance	2008
Dance Umbrella Purcell Room	C-12 Dance Theatre	Remix for contemporary dance performance	2008
R3 City & Islington College	C-12 Dance Theatre	Musical composition for contemporary dance performance	2008
The Chair Edinburg Festival	C-12 Dance Theatre	Mix for contemporary dance theatre score	2009
Skin Deep Space @ Clarence Mews	Lerato Lipere	Soundtrack (writing and composition) for contemporary dance performance	2009
Synthes:s, London Week of Peace, Hackney Wick Festival	Deep:Black/Arcola Theatre	Recording of operatic vocal performance	2009
The Last Supper Royal Opera House	Juwon Ogungbe/Larry Coke	Recording of operatic vocal performance (2 solos and chorus)	2010
Synthes:s 2 Arcola Theatre	Deep:Black/Arcola Theatre	Electronic sound installation	2010
Live @ Audio Underground	Juwon Ogungbe Trio	Live session recording/Engineer/mix and master	2010
Temps Mort Cultural Explosion Rich Mix 2011	Vocab Dance Company	Remix for contemporary dance performance	2010
Word! Stratford Circus	Vocab Dance Company	Composition and sound editing for dance theatre triple bill, plus ensemble dancer for national tour	2011
Loving You	New World Dance Company	Soundtrack for short film	2011
Voices in the Alleyway Cochrane Theatre London	Spread Expression Dance Company and Faith Drama Productions	Score for full length hip/hop theatre production	2011
Unrecognisable Venus Hates Mars: Stratford Circus London	Vocab Dance Company	Soundtrack for experimental short film	2011
Unrecognisable Venus Hates Mars: Stratford Circus London	Natalie James: Broken Doll Dance Company	Score Composor	2011
Loneliness Venus Hates Mars: Stratford Circus London	Odilia Egyiawan	Sound piece for contemporary dance performance	2011
Physionix Rich Mix London	Paradigmz	Score for contemporary dance theatre performance	2012
The Van Man Albany Theatre London	C-12 Dance Theatre	Musical composition for outdoor, site specific contemporary dance performance	2012
Let's Dance: Big Dance Canary Wharf London	C-12 Dance Theatre	Sound track for large scale, outdoor, participatory dance performance	2012
Scorned	C-12 Dance Theatre	Sound track compilation and editing of published recorded music and for contemporary dance performance	2012
Kindred Tribe Asabaako Festival Busua Beach	Asabaako Festival	3-piece dance music group. Music production, song writing, choreography, vocals, live programming, community workshops	2012
Our Mighty Groove Version 1 Sadler's Wells London	Uchenna Dance Company	Sound track composer. 35min interactive dance theatre production set in a New York House club	2013
Our Mighty Groove Version 2 Stratford Theatre Royal London	Uchenna Dance Company	Sound track composer. 50min interactive dance theatre production set in a New York House club	2015
Afro Dance Promo Video	Noir Dance Company	Sound track composer 3min promotional dance video	2016
Movement is Life	Awotwi Movement	Sound track composer, choreographer. Promotional dance video directed by Oskhari	2016
Head Wrap Diaries 2016	Uchenna Dance Company	Sound track composer. Full-length interactive dance theatre production "An insight into the world of the African woman"	2016
Obatala	Kemi Durosinmi	Soundtrack composer Dance short film inspired by Yoruba Orisha Obatala	2017
Giant	Alesandra Seutin	Composer of one track plus one ambient sound piece for a solo dance theatre production staged in Belgium	2017
Your Love is Enough	John Thomas	Producer, songwriter: Creating 2 gospel tracks in collaboration with John Thomas (the artist).	2017
Free & Unashamed October	Ebein Studios	Theme song for a talk show to be featured on GH1 Ghana: Soundtrack composer, engineer and mastering	2017
Across the Souvenir	Alesandra Seutin	Soundtrack composer for 30 min solo dance performance piece	2017
