= With Us Until You're Dead =

Studio album by Archive
- Released: 27 August 2012
- Genre: Trip hop, alternative rock
- Label: Dangervisit Records

Archive chronology
Controlling Crowds – Part IV (2009)	With Us Until You're Dead (2012)	Axiom (2014)

With Us Until You're Dead is the eighth studio album of the London-based trip hop band Archive.

== Reception ==
Professional ratings
Aggregate scores
Source	Rating
Metacritic	72/100
Review scores
Source	Rating

With Us Until You're Dead received mixed to positive reviews from critics. On Metacritic, the album holds a score of 72/100 based on 4 reviews, indicating "generally favorable reviews".

== Track listing ==
1. "Wiped Out" – 6:21 (music: Keeler, Griffiths – lyrics: Griffiths, Keeler)
2. "Interlace" – 4:43 (music: Keeler – lyrics: Pen)
3. "Stick Me in My Heart" – 3:57 (music: Keeler, Griffiths – lyrics: Griffiths, Berrier)
4. "Conflict" – 5:01 (music: Keeler – lyrics: Pen)
5. "Violently" – 6:24 (music: Griffiths, Keeler – lyrics: Griffiths, Martin)
6. "Calm Now" – 3:53 (Keeler, Griffiths)
7. "Silent" – 5:39 (music: Keeler – lyrics: Griffiths, Quintile)
8. "Twisting" – 4:02 (music: Keeler – lyrics: Berrier)
9. "Things Going Down" – 1:52 (music: Griffiths, Keeler – lyrics: Griffiths, Quintile)
10. "Hatchet" – 4:16 (music: Keeler, Griffiths – lyrics: Martin, Griffiths)
11. "Damage" – 6:50 (music: Keeler, Griffiths – lyrics: Berrier, Griffiths)
12. "Rise" – 2:50 (music: Keeler- lyrics: Pen)
13. "Aggravated Twisted Fill (Bonus)" – 3:36 (music: Keeler, Griffiths – lyrics: Griffiths, Berrier)
14. "Soul Tired (Bonus)" – 3:51 (music: Griffiths – lyrics: Griffiths, Pen)

== Personnel ==
- Darius Keeler – Keyboards, piano, electric piano, synthesizers, programmer, arrangements, orchestral arrangements, production
- Danny Griffiths – Keyboards, samples, sound effects, programmer, arrangements, production
- Pollard Berrier – Vocals (tracks 1, 3, 8, 11), rhythm guitar (track 1)
- Dave Pen – Vocals (tracks 2, 4, 12), rhythm guitar (2, 8), percussions
- Maria Quintile – Vocals (tracks 7, 9)
- Holly Martin – Vocals (tracks 5, 10)
- Steve "Smiley" Barnard – Drums
- Steve Harris – Lead guitar
- Jonathan Noyce – Bass guitar

== Charts ==
=== Weekly charts ===
Chart (2012)	Peak position
Austrian Albums (Ö3 Austria)	47
Belgian Albums (Ultratop Flanders)	67
Belgian Albums (Ultratop Wallonia)	4
French Albums (SNEP)	7
German Albums (Offizielle Top 100)	35
Polish Albums (ZPAV)	4
Swiss Albums (Schweizer Hitparade)	4

=== Year-end charts ===
Chart (2012)	Position
French Albums (SNEP)	186
