= Genesis Revisited: Live at the Royal Albert Hall =

Live album by Steve Hackett
- Released: 30 June 2014
- Recorded: 24 October 2013
- Venue: The Royal Albert Hall, London
- Genre: Progressive rock
- Length: 135:18
- Label: Inside Out Music

Steve Hackett chronology
Genesis Revisited: Live at Hammersmith (2013)	Genesis Revisited: Live at the Royal Albert Hall (2014)	Wolflight (2015)

Professional ratings
Review scores
Source	Rating
All About Jazz	5/5 stars

Genesis Revisited: Live at the Royal Albert Hall is a live album by musician Steve Hackett. It was recorded at the Royal Albert Hall, London, during the second UK leg of a tour around the release of Genesis Revisited II. It features a full set from the show performed on 24 October 2013, including 18 Genesis songs. The box set features the full live show across two CDs and on one DVD, together with a further DVD containing two documentaries.

== Track listing ==
All tracks are written by Tony Banks, Phil Collins, Peter Gabriel, Steve Hackett and Mike Rutherford, except where noted.

Disc 1
No.	Title	Writer(s)	Length
1.	"Dance on a Volcano"	Banks; Collins; Rutherford; Hackett	6:39
2.	"Dancing with the Moonlit Knight"		7:53
3.	"Fly on a Windshield"		3:39
4.	"Broadway Melody of 1974"		2:54
5.	"Carpet Crawlers"		6:09
6.	"The Return of the Giant Hogweed"		8:38
7.	"The Musical Box"		11:25
8.	"Horizons"		2:01
9.	"Unquiet Slumbers for the Sleepers..."	Hackett; Rutherford	2:13
10.	"...In That Quiet Earth"	Hackett; Rutherford; Banks; Collins	4:59
11.	"Afterglow"	Banks	4:12
12.	"I Know What I Like"		6:36
Total length:			67:18

Disc 2
No.	Title	Writer(s)	Length
1.	"Firth of Fifth"		10:15
2.	"Ripples"	Rutherford; Banks	5:28
3.	"The Fountain of Salmacis"		8:00
4.	"Supper's Ready"		26:15
5.	"Watcher of the Skies"		9:07
6.	"Los Endos"	Banks; Collins; Hackett; Rutherford	8:55
Total length:			68:00

== Personnel ==
Band

- Steve Hackett – guitar, vocals
- Roger King – keyboards
- Nad Sylvan – vocals, tambourine
- Gary O'Toole – drums, percussion, vocals
- Lee Pomeroy – bass, bass pedals, percussion, twelve-string guitar, vocals
- Rob Townsend – saxophone, woodwind, percussion, vocals, keyboards

Special guests

- Amanda Lehmann
- John Wetton
- Ray Wilson
- Roine Stolt

== Charts ==
Chart (2014)	Peak position
Belgian Albums (Ultratop Wallonia)	109
German Albums (Offizielle Top 100)	23
Scottish Albums (OCC)	83
UK Albums (OCC)	80
