= Axiom (Archive album) =

Studio album by Archive
- Released: 26 May 2014
- Genre: Trip hop, alternative rock
- Length: 39:33
- Label: Dangervisit Records

Archive chronology
With Us Until You're Dead (2012)	Axiom (2014)	Restriction (2015)

Axiom is the ninth studio album by the London-based trip hop band Archive. It was released in May 2014.

== Track listing ==
No.	Title	Lyrics	Music	Length
1.	"Distorted Angels"	Danny Griffiths, Pollard Berrier	Darius Keeler	3:22
2.	"Axiom"	Instrumental	Darius Keeler, Danny Griffiths	9:59
3.	"Baptism"	Dave Pen	Darius Keeler	5:02
4.	"Transmission Data Terminate"	Danny Griffiths	Darius Keeler, Danny Griffiths	4:57
5.	"The Noise of Flames Crashing"	Danny Griffiths	Darius Keeler	4:16
6.	"Shiver"	Pollard Berrier, Dave Pen, Danny Griffiths	Darius Keeler	7:32
7.	"Axiom (Reprise)"	Instrumental	Darius Keeler	4:25

== Personnel ==
- Darius Keeler – Keyboards, piano, electric piano, synthesizers, programmer, arrangements, orchestral arrangements, production
- Danny Griffiths – Keyboards, samples, sound effects, programmer, arrangements, production
- Pollard Berrier – Vocals (tracks 1,4,6)
- Dave Pen – Vocals (tracks 3,6), guitar (track 2)
- Maria Quintile – Vocals (track 5)
- Holly Martin – Vocals (tracks 4)
- Steve "Smiley" Barnard – Drums
- Steve Harris – Guitar
- Jonathan Noyce – Bass guitar

== Charts ==
Chart (2014)	Peak position
Belgian Albums (Ultratop Flanders)	169
Belgian Albums (Ultratop Wallonia)	22
French Albums (SNEP)	25
German Albums (Offizielle Top 100)	57
Polish Albums (ZPAV)	37
Swiss Albums (Schweizer Hitparade)	9
