= Genesis Revisited: Live at Hammersmith =

Live album by Steve Hackett
- Released: 21 October 2013
- Recorded: 10 May 2013
- Venue: The Apollo, Hammersmith, London
- Genre: Progressive rock
- Length: 149:06
- Label: Inside Out Music

Steve Hackett chronology
Genesis Revisited II (2012)	Genesis Revisited: Live at Hammersmith (2013)	Genesis Revisited: Live at the Royal Albert Hall (2014)

Professional ratings
Review scores
Source	Rating
All About Jazz	5/5 stars
Record Collector	4/5 stars

Genesis Revisited: Live at Hammersmith is an album by musician Steve Hackett. It was recorded at the Hammersmith Apollo, during the tour around the release of Genesis Revisited II. It features a full set from the show performed on 10 May 2013, including 18 Genesis songs, and one solo song, Shadow of the Hierophant, that was originally planned as a Genesis song. The box set features the full live show across three CDs and on one DVD, together with a further DVD containing a Behind the Scenes featurette.

== Track listing ==
All tracks are written by Tony Banks, Phil Collins, Peter Gabriel, Steve Hackett and Mike Rutherford, except where noted.

Disc 1
No.	Title	Writer(s)	Length
1.	"Watcher of the Skies"		9:12
2.	"The Chamber of 32 Doors"		5:39
3.	"Dancing with the Moonlit Knight"		7:37
4.	"Fly on a Windshield"		3:34
5.	"Broadway Melody of 1974"		3:19
6.	"The Lamia"		9:04
7.	"The Musical Box"		11:30
8.	"Shadow of the Hierophant"	Hackett; Rutherford	10:14
9.	"Blood on the Rooftops"	Hackett; Collins	5:46
Total length:			65:54

Disc 2
No.	Title	Writer(s)	Length
1.	"Unquiet Slumbers for the Sleepers..."	Hackett; Rutherford	2:10
2.	"...In That Quiet Earth"	Hackett; Rutherford; Banks; Collins	5:03
3.	"Afterglow"	Banks	4:28
4.	"I Know What I Like"		6:15
5.	"Dance on a Volcano"	Banks; Collins; Rutherford; Hackett	6:14
6.	"Entangled"	Hackett; Banks	6:44
7.	"Eleventh Earl of Mar"	Banks; Hackett; Rutherford	7:49
8.	"Supper's Ready"		27:34
Total length:			66:17

Disc 3
No.	Title	Writer(s)	Length
1.	"Firth of Fifth"		10:33
2.	"Los Endos"	Banks; Collins; Hackett; Rutherford	6:22
Total length:			16:55

== Personnel ==
Band

- Steve Hackett – guitar, vocals
- Roger King – keyboards
- Nad Sylvan – vocals, tambourine
- Gary O'Toole – drums, percussion, vocals
- Lee Pomeroy – bass, bass pedals, Variax, twelve-string, vocals
- Rob Townsend – saxophone, woodwind, percussion, vocals, keyboards

Special guests

- Jakko Jakszyk
- Nik Kershaw
- Amanda Lehmann
- Steve Rothery
- John Wetton

== Charts ==
Chart (2013)	Peak position
Belgian Albums (Ultratop Flanders)	195
Belgian Albums (Ultratop Wallonia)	78
Dutch Albums (Album Top 100)	53
German Albums (Offizielle Top 100)	17
Scottish Albums (OCC)	67
Swiss Albums (Schweizer Hitparade)	97
UK Albums (OCC)	58
