= I Am Ali =

- Theatrical release poster
- Directed by: Clare Lewins
- Produced by: John Battsek; Simon Chinn; Helen Bennitt; George Chignell; Greg Hobden; Clare Lewins
- Cinematography: Stuart Luck
- Edited by: Mark 'Reg' Wrench
- Production companies: Fisheye Films; Passion Pictures
- Distributed by: Focus World (United States); Quest; Universal Pictures (International)
- Release date: November 28, 2014 (UK)
- Running time: 111 minutes
- Countries: United States; United Kingdom
- Language: English

I Am Ali is a 2014 documentary directed by Clare Lewins. It covers the life of professional boxer Muhammad Ali. The film tells his story using personal audio recordings Ali made himself during the 1970s. Additionally, interviews of friends, family members, and people associated with professional boxing, combined with archival footage of Ali, are used throughout the movie. Notable appearances in the film include George Foreman, Jim Brown, and Mike Tyson.

== Overview ==
The film begins with a phone call between Ali and his daughter Hana that took place on November 30, 1979. In the call Ali tells Hana, a young child at the time, that he might fight in one final boxing match. Hana tells him not to do it. The film then transitions to Ali's last professional fight, which took place in 1981, two years later.

According to director Clare Lewins, she did not want to cover Ali's entire life in a linear manner, but instead wished to start with his decision to accept that final professional fight.

From there, glimpses of Ali's life are shown through archival footage, interviews with friends and family, and many more of Ali's personal audio recordings. Notable periods of his life are covered by interviews with those who knew him best, and others who considered themselves fans and admirers. Through these devices the documentary looks back at Ali's life, beginning with early childhood. Scenes include a retelling of the theft of Ali's bicycle when he was a child. That crime played a key role in his entering the sport of boxing when he was twelve years old. Ali's brother Rahaman states that even from those early teen years Ali felt he would become one of the greatest boxers of all time.

Numerous audio clips from various sources featuring Ali's voice are presented throughout the movie. A wide range of moments are covered in these recordings. They include Ali singing with his daughter Hana, his discussions with the White House, and a conversation with a pizza delivery man who stopped by Ali's home.

The documentary also focuses on Ali's relationship to the boxing world. Ali's boxing matches with various rivals, including Joe Frazier, George Foreman, and Sonny Liston are discussed. Former heavyweight champion Mike Tyson talks about how he aspired to fight at the same level as Ali. George Foreman shares how Ali would tease and taunt him during their boxing matches. Singer Tom Jones talks about his admiration for Ali's boxing skills and persona. Former business manager Gene Kilroy weighs in on several topics. Also interviewed is photographer Carl Fischer, who took photos of Ali for the cover of Esquire.

Another topic touched on is Ali's conversion to Islam, including why he changed his name from Cassius Clay to Muhammad Ali. That line of exploration also includes Ali's conscientious objector status to the Vietnam War, and his refusal to join the military based on his religious beliefs.

Ebony described the film as follows:

I Am Ali shows the rarely seen personal side of a man who outside of changing the world and moving like a butterfly inside the ring, managed to bring together a family through phone calls strengthened by blood and purpose.

== Reception ==
Of the film, Ali's daughter Hana felt her father would be happy with Lewins' direction of the film, especially the depiction of Ali's "loving side."

The Chicago Tribune said, "At its best, I Am Ali offers something the big-budget biopic Ali could not: casual intimacy."

NPR stated, "What distinguishes Lewins' entertaining-if-not-terribly-revelatory film from the many Ali documentaries that have come before is its focus on this most public of personalities as a friend and father."

The Guardian called the film "warm hearted and respectful" and a "very watchable tribute" though it felt it might not live up to other films about Ali.

== Music ==
There was no soundtrack album issued with the music of the film. The tracks featured in the film were the following:

- "Driving South" (composed by Jimi Hendrix) performed by Jimi Hendrix
- "I Wish" (Stevie Wonder) by Stevie Wonder
- "Louisville KY" (Sonny Skyler) by Ella Fitzgerald
- "Upside Down Cake" (Thomas Newman)
- "Vanessa and Hugh's Tune" (Simon Bass, Geoff Dunn, Jonathan Noyce, Simon Bates, Carl Hudson)
- "I'm Ready" (Muddy Waters, Willie Dixon) by Muddy Waters
- "Walters Blues" (Tim Oliver)
- "Moon Over Miami" (Edgar Leslie, Joe Burke) by Ray Charles
- "The Orchard" (Thomas Newman)
- "Sweet As" (Simon Bass)
- "Skip Skank" (Tim Oliver) by Tim Oliver
- "Rak & Ruin" (Simon Bass, Geoff Dunn)
- "Sportin Soul" (Keith Roberts) by the Peter Dennis Orchestra
- "Signed Sealed Delivered" (Lee Garrett, Syreeta Wright, Stevie Wonder, Lula Mae Hardaway) by Stevie
- "Eve of Destruction" (P. F. Sloan) by P. F. Sloan
- "Is It Because I'm Black" (G. Watts, J Jones, S. Johnson) by Syl Johnson
- "Hey Joe" (Billy Roberts) by Jimi Hendrix
- "Always Waiting" (Michael Kiwanuka, Paul Butler) by Michael Kiwanuka
- "Tell Me A Tale" (Michael Kiwanuka, Paul Butler) by Michael Kiwanuka
- "Respect Yourself" (Luther Ingram, Mack Rice) by The Staple Singers
- "The Lucky One" (Robert Lee Castleman) by Alison Krauss & The Union Station
- "Whisper of a Thrill" (Thomas Newman)
- "My Son" (Thomas Newman)
- "Grace & Mercy" (Tim Oliver) by Tim Oliver
- "Tomorrow" (Salif Keita) by Salif Keita
- "Nuvole Blanche" (Ludovico Einaudi) by Ludovico Einaudi
- "Dedicated to the One I Love" (Lowman Pauling, Ralph Bass) by The Mamas & The Papas
- "Best of My Love" (Maurice White, Al McKay) by The Emotions
- "Still Looking for Tomorrow" (Tim Oliver) by Tim Oliver
- "Together in Electric Dreams" (Philip Oakey, Giorgio Moroder) by Phil Oakey
- "Road to Perdition" (Thomas Newman)
- "Worry Walks Beside Me" (Michael Kiwanuka, Paul Butler, Holly Eliza Martin) by Michael Kiwanuka
- "The Bahamas" (Simon Bass) by Simon Bass
- "Hard to See" (Michael Kiwanuka) by Michael Kiwanuka
- "See the Sun" (Lisa Gerrard, Pieter Bourke) by Lisa Gerrard & Pieter Bourke
- "Cathedral" (Thomas Newman)
- "Just Another Ordinary Day" (Patrick Watson, Robbie Kuster, Simon Angell, Mishka Stein)
- "Run Like the Breeze" (Michael Kiwanuka) by Michael Kiwanuka

== See also ==
- List of boxing films
