= Archive (band) =

English band

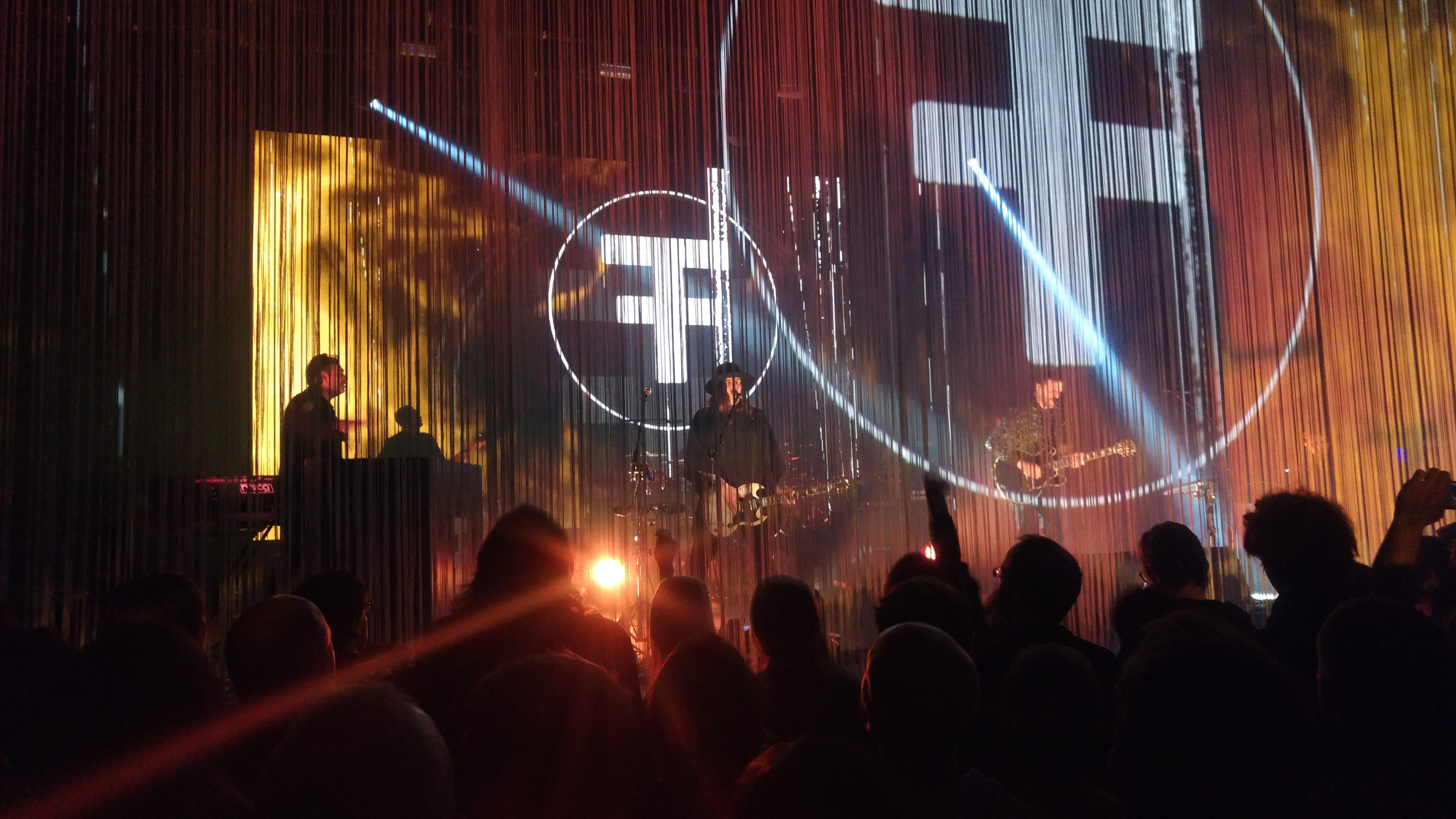
- Archive at Château Rouge, Annemasse in 2017

Background information
- Origin: London, England
- Genres: Trip hop; electronica; progressive rock; new prog; shoegaze
- Years active: 1994–present
- Labels: Island, Independiente
- Members: Danny Griffiths; Darius Keeler; Rosko John; Dave Pen; Pollard Berrier; Maria Q Jonathan Noyce; Steve Harris; Karl Hinze; Steve "Smiley" Barnard; Steve Davis; Holly Martin; Mickey Hurcombe; Lisa Mottram
- Past members: Roya Arab; Suzanne Wooder; Craig Walker; Lee Pomeroy; Steve "Keys" Watts; Dale Davis
- Website: archiveofficial.uk

Archive are a musical group based in London, England, whose music spans electronic, trip hop, avant-garde, post-rock and progressive rock. Over their 32-year history, the band has released thirteen studio albums and enjoyed established success throughout Europe.

== History ==
=== Londinium and Take My Head (1994–1999) ===
Archive was formed in 1994 as a trip hop band when Darius Keeler and Danny Griffiths formed up with Roya Arab and rapper Rosko John. After releasing a few singles on their own label, they broke up in early 1996 following a dispute. A few months later, the group reformed with new personnel and began recording their debut album. Londinium was released on Island Records in September 1996. The album featured a mix of dark trip hop, electronica, string arrangements and classically influenced songwriting. However, creative differences on the follow-up resulted in the band once again breaking up.

In 1997, Keeler and Griffiths regrouped and continued Archive with another female singer, Suzanne Wooder. In 1999, Archive released their second studio album on Independiente, entitled Take My Head. The album features a mix of pop and symphonic trip hop, far more melodic than its predecessor. Due to differences of musical taste with an undisclosed number of producers the band tried to work with on the album, they have described it as their least favorite album the band recorded.

=== Craig Walker era (2000–2004) ===
In 2000, Keeler and Griffiths began to demo new tracks for further studio production. After establishing a new sound to work with, the boys placed an advert in Mojo magazine, looking for a new lead singer. Craig Walker answered the advert and immediately began working with the band and singing on the tune that Darius wrote, entitled, "Again".

Between 2002 and 2005, the band released three studio albums with Walker to further growing popularity and critical acclaim. "You All Look The Same To Me" (2002), "Noise" (2004), and "Michel Vaillant" were albums that marked a turning point of the Archive sound that gradually turned away from their roots in electronica and trip hop and towards more of a psychedelic and progressive style. One of the three composed albums was the soundtrack to the French film Michel Vaillant, released in November 2003. In winter of 2014, teaser music from the band's upcoming album was used for a TV advertisement for Meetic.

In November 2004, Archive began their European tour without Walker, posting on their website that Walker would not be joining the band as he has left Archive due to personal differences.

=== Collective phase (2004–present) ===
In Autumn of 2004, Archive announced that Dave Pen (BirdPen) would replace Walker on the Noise tour. During this same tour, Keeler and Griffiths met the singer Pollard Berrier (formerly of the band Bauchklang) at one of their shows in Vienna, Austria. Pollard had given Darius a demo CD of his own written material, with the intention of starting another project with Dan and Darius. Because of the latter circumstances, the three began writing and rehearsing together, and were recording in Southside Studios, London, by September 2005. A new modern era for Archive had begun with Darius, Dan and Pollard all writing and co-writing seven tracks and Dave Pen co-writing three, on the album, "Lights". Maria Q sang on three (including backing) tracks. From this point on, Archive was no longer a "front-man-band", but a "collective" of individual artists contributing to what is now an established sound. The album "Lights" was released in May 2006 and received high critical acclaim in France, Switzerland, Greece and Poland. Archive enjoyed predominantly sold-out gigs on their "Lights" Tour, as well as high acclaim at festivals around Europe.

In May 2009, Archive returned to release their most acclaimed album to date, "Controlling Crowds I-III". It reached number one in the French charts for a week, number one in Greece, number two in Switzerland and number 5 in Luxembourg. The single, "Bullets", was their most acclaimed single to date and reached the charts in Greece, Poland, Switzerland, France, and Germany. It has also been featured in the teaser trailer for Cyberpunk 2077. The biggest surprise of this album was the return of Rosko John, who adds an unforeseen depth to the seventh studio album. In September 2009, the follow-up album "Controlling Crowds: Part IV" was released, along with single "The Empty Bottle". Archive continued their "Controlling Crowds" tour, having already sold out some fifty concerts from September 2009 - February 2010, up to and extensively for the 2010 Summer Festival Season.

==== With Us Until You're Dead ====
Archive have worked on their eighth studio album (excluding Michel Vaillant) in London and Paris; under new management, having finished their deal with Warner Music - This has enlivened hopes in their home country of an official release at last. As early as November 2011, short samples of new works featured on the band's official website.

In May 2012, the band confirmed via the website that the album, titled With Us Until You're Dead, would be released on 27 August from their own label Dangervisit Records. It was accompanied by a European tour starting in October, to which a London show was promptly added. Fusing orchestral, electronic, soulful, progressive and emotional elements, Keeler describes the new material in comparison to previous works as "more personal - love songs basically. But coming at the subject matter in that non-formatted Archive way." Fans heard a new song, Violently, featuring new vocalist Holly Martin, which was released as part of the Wiped Out / Violently EP on 2 July.

==== Axiom ====
In November 2013, Archive announced details of their most ambitious project to date, a forty-minute short film and accompanying album set for release in May 2014.

The film was created with the help of Spanish film collective NYSU. Director Jesus Hernandez said of the film: "Archive has produced a great album that works like an entire movie script... Our challenge was to translate the band’s script into images." The film is set on Axiom, an island in the middle of nowhere with steep cliffs on all sides. On the island there is an underground city dominated by a bell, which decides the fate of the city's inhabitants.

The album, titled Axiom, was officially released on 26 May 2014. The band debuted the short film and performed live at the 2014 Sundance London film festival.

==== Restriction ====
On 20 October 2014 Archive announced their upcoming album Restriction which was released on 12 January 2015. Videos for the tracks "Black and Blue", "Kid Corner" and "Feel It" are available for viewing on the official website.

==== The False Foundation ====
On 7 October 2016 Archive released their tenth album The False Foundation. The band released music videos for "Driving In Nails", "Bright Lights" and "The False Foundation".

==== 25 ====
To celebrate their 25 years of activity, in May 2019 the band released a massive retrospective collection called "25". The standard edition features 26 tracks drawn from the band's career, including new and previously unreleased songs - including collaborations with Band of Skulls and Steve Mason. The 4 CD deluxe edition contains 42 tracks.

==== Versions ====
In 2020 Archive released the remix album Versions, a collection of 10 previously released songs that were remixed or re-recorded to generate mostly more quiet and atmospheric versions.

==== Call to Arms & Angels ====
On 29 April 2022 Archive released their twelfth studio album Call to Arms & Angels recorded at RAK Studios and produced by Jérome Devoise. The album features 17 tracks and is accompanied by the documentary Super8: A Call to Arms & Angels. Archive released music videos for the tracks "Shouting Within", "Fear There & Everywhere", "We Are the Same", and "Frying Paint". The album introduces Lisa Mottram as the band's new vocalist.

The associated tour, scheduled for autumn 2022, had to be postponed in August 2022 by one year due to Darius Keeler's treatment for colon cancer.

==== Glass Minds ====
On 10 September 2025 Archive announced their thirteenth studio album titled Glass Minds alongside the release of its lead single, "Look at Us". Two additional singles, "Wake Up Strange" and "City Walls", followed ahead of the album's release on 27 February 2026. Glass Minds was produced by Archive and Jérôme Devoise, recorded at Metway Studios in Brighton and Angel Studios in London, and mixed at Studio DES in Paris. The album artwork was designed by Alaric Hammond, whose work has been collected by the Saatchi Gallery.

The 12-track LP features vocals from Lisa Mottram, Pollard Berrier, Dave Pen, and the unexpected addition of Jimmy Collins, who contributes rap vocals to "Heads Are Gonna Roll". The album serves as a follow-up to the band's previous triple LP, and while more condensed, explores an expansive and varied musical landscape. "Broken Bits" opens the album with a film score-esque instrumental epic featuring synth arpeggios and orchestra. This sonic palette persists throughout the record, though the collective takes it in several distinct directions. "Patterns" harkens back to Londinium with its melancholic downtempo rhythms, while "When You're This Down" recalls the Controlling Crowds era through its punchy, percussion-driven production. Similarly, "Heads Are Gonna Roll" marks a return to the band's trip-hop roots. Tracks such as "Wake Up Strange" venture into new territory for Archive, adopting a more electro-pop sound.

The album received generally positive reviews and was accompanied by extensive European touring, as well as the band's first-ever tour of the United States and Canada.

== Members ==
=== Band members ===
- Darius Keeler – keyboards, synthesizer, piano, organ, programming, arrangements, production
- Danny Griffiths – keyboards, samples, additional programming, arrangements, production
- Pollard Berrier – vocals, guitar
- Maria "Q" Quintile – vocals
- Holly Martin – vocals
- Lisa Mottram – vocals
- James Collins - vocals
- Dave Pen – vocals, guitar, percussion
- Mike Hurcombe – guitar
- Jonathan Noyce – bass
- Steve "Smiley" Barnard – drums

=== Former members ===
- Rosko John – songwriting, vocals, MC
- Craig Walker – songwriting, vocals, guitar
- Steve Harris – guitar, backing vocals
- Matheu Martin – drums
- Suzanne Wooder – vocals
- Roya Arab – songwriting and vocals
- Lee Pomeroy – bass, mellotron
- Dale Davis – bass
- Tom Brazelle – harmonica

== Discography ==
=== Studio albums ===
- Londinium (1996)
- Take My Head (1999)
- You All Look the Same to Me (2002)
- Noise (2004)
- Lights (2006)
- Controlling Crowds (2009)
- Controlling Crowds – Part IV (2009)
- With Us Until You're Dead (2012)
- Axiom (2014)
- Restriction (2015)
- The False Foundation (2016)
- Call to Arms and Angels (2022)
- Glass Minds (2026)
- Not In My Name (2027) - expected release date: 19th March 2027

=== Soundtracks ===
- Michel Vaillant by Archive (soundtrack from Michel Vaillant) (2003)
- Voleuses (soundtrack from Mélanie Laurent's Voleuse) (2023)

=== Compilations ===
- Controlling Crowds – The Complete Edition Parts I–IV (2009)
- Demos and Tracks from the Archives (2010)
- Demos and Tracks from the Archives 2 (2012)
- 25 (2019)

=== Live albums ===
- Live at Paris/France Inter (2002)
- Unplugged (2004)
- Live for 3 nights at Les Nuits Botaniques Festival - Brussels May 2005 (2005, promo)
- Live at the Zenith (2007)
- Live at La Géode (only sold by French FNAC) (2010)
- Live 2010 Ancienne Belgique, Brussels 17th January 2010 (only sold by ConcertLive.co.uk) (2010)
- Live 2010 Le Zenith, Paris 23rd January 2010 (only sold by ConcertLive.co.uk) (2010)

=== Live DVD ===
- Live at the Zenith (deluxe package) (2007)
- Live in Athens (sold at PledgeMusic.com) (2011)

=== Remix albums ===
- Unrestricted (2015)
- Versions (2020)

=== EPs ===
- The Absurd EP (2002)
- Pieces B Sides (2006)
- Wiped Out / Violently EP (2012)
- Live EP (2013)
- Restriction Outtakes EP (2015)
- Show Me Heaven EP (2025)

=== Singles ===
Londinium

- "Londinium" (1996)
- "So Few Words" (1996)
- "Nothing Else" (1996)

Take My Head

- "You Make Me Feel" (1999)
- "The Way You Love Me" (1999)
- "Take My Head" (1999, promo)
- "Cloud in the Sky" (2000)

You All Look The Same to Me

- "Again" (2001/2002)
- "Numb" (2002)
- "Goodbye" (2002, promo)
- "Men Like You / Meon" (2003)

Michel Vaillant

- "Friend" (2003)
- "Main Bridge Scene" (2003)

Noise

- "Get Out" (2004)
- "Fuck U" (2004, promo)
- "Sleep" (2004, promo)

Lights

- "System" (2006, promo)
- "Fold" (2006, promo)
- "Sane" (2006, promo)

Controlling Crowds (Parts I-III)

- "Bullets" (2009)
- "Kings of Speed" (2009, promo)
- "Collapse/Collide" (2009)

Controlling Crowds – Part IV

- "The Empty Bottle" (2009)
- "Lines" (2009, promo)

With Us Until You're Dead

- "Violently" (2012, promo)
- "Wiped Out" (2012)
- "Hatchet" (2012)
- "Stick Me In My Heart" (2013)

Axiom

- "Distorted Angels" (2014)
- "Axiom" (2014)

Restriction

- "Black & Blue" (2014)
- "Feel It" (2014)
- "Kid Corner" (2014)
- "End of Our Days" (2015)

The False Foundation

- "Driving In Nails" (2016)
- "Bright Lights" (2016)
- "The False Foundation" (2016)
- "Versions" (2020)

Call To Arms and Angels

- "Super8" (2021)
- "Shouting Within" (2021)
- "Daytime Coma" (2021)

== Entourage ==
- BirdPen
- Robin Foster
