= Like Weather =

Studio album by Leila
- Released: 30 March 1998
- Studio: Leila's home
- Genre: IDM; trip hop
- Length: 48:15
- Label: Rephlex
- Producer: Leila

Leila chronology
Like Weather (1998)	Courtesy of Choice (2000)

Singles from Like Weather
- 1. "Don't Fall Asleep" Released: 17 November 1997; 2. "Space, Love" Released: 9 February 1998; 3. "Feeling" Released: 20 July 1998; 4. "Underwaters (One for Keni)" Released: 1 December 2011

Like Weather is the debut studio album by English electronic musician Leila. It was released on 30 March 1998 by Rephlex Records.

== Critical reception ==
Professional ratings
Review scores
Source	Rating
AllMusic	4/5 stars
Encyclopedia of Popular Music	4/5 stars
The Guardian	4/5 stars
Muzik	8/10
NME	9/10
Uncut	9/10

Reviewing Like Weather for AllMusic, John Bush noted the album's "tremendously eclectic" tone, which he said "is of an experimentalism far in advance of other electronic singer/songwriter acts out there."

At the end of 1998, NME named Like Weather the year's 10th best album. In 2015, it was placed at number six on Fact's list of the best trip hop albums of all time, with the magazine calling it "a hazy, underwater daydream of a record with half-heard soul, pop and chiming ice cream truck electronics swirling together in a soup of memory and emotion. Not quite trip-hop and not quite illbient, it certainly wasn't IDM either." Two years later, Fact listed Like Weather as one of the best albums of 1998, and Pitchfork ranked it as the 39th best IDM album of all time.

== Track listing ==
No.	Title	Writer(s)	Length
1.	"Something"	Leila Arab; Luca Santucci	1:29
2.	"Don't Fall Asleep"	L. Arab; Santucci	3:27
3.	"Underwaters (One for Keni)"	L. Arab	3:24
4.	"Feeling"	L. Arab; Donna Paul	4:40
5.	"Blue Grace"	L. Arab; Roya Arab	4:07
6.	"Space, Love"	L. Arab	4:57
7.	"Knew"	L. Arab; Santucci	1:18
8.	"Melodicore"	L. Arab	5:21
9.	"So Low...Amen"	L. Arab; Santucci	6:15
10.	"Misunderstood"	L. Arab; Paul	3:31
11.	"Piano-String"	L. Arab	2:33
12.	"Won't You Be My Baby, Baby"	L. Arab; Santucci; Brian Auger; Roger Sutton	4:09
13.	"Away"	L. Arab; Santucci	3:04
Total length:			48:15

Sample credits

- "Won't You Be My Baby, Baby" contains samples of "Break It Up", written by Brian Auger and Roger Sutton and performed by Brian Auger and the Trinity and Julie Driscoll.

== Personnel ==
Credits are adapted from the album's liner notes.

- Leila – production, mixing, recording
- Ali Akbar – arrangement consultancy (track 6)
- Roya Arab – vocals (track 5)
- Richard D. James – post-production editing
- Dan Lipman – alto flute (track 5)
- Donna Paul – vocals (tracks 4, 10)
- Luca Santucci – vocals (tracks 1, 2, 7, 9, 12, 13)
- Paul Solomons – post-production editing
- Benet Walsh – violin (track 6)
- Gabriel Walsh – trumpet (track 12)

== Charts ==
Chart (1998)	Peak position
UK Independent Albums (OCC)	19
