= Holy Holy (tribute band) =

British supergroup

Holy Holy is a supergroup that performs the musical works of David Bowie. The group features drummer Woody Woodmansey, formerly of Bowie's backing band The Spiders from Mars, and Tony Visconti, Bowie's long time producer and occasional bass player, as well as a number of other notable musicians. Steve "Smiley" Barnard replaced Woody Woodmansey as drummer at the start of 2022. but Woodmansey returned in 2025.

== Members ==
- Bass: Tony Visconti
- Drums: Woody Woodmansey
- Vocals: Glenn Gregory
- Guitar: James Stevenson
- Guitar: Paul Cuddeford
- Keyboards: Berenice Scott
- Keyboards: Janette Mason (2022)
- Vocals, saxophone, guitar : Jessica Lee Morgan

=== Occasional and former contributors ===
- Vocals: Marc Almond
- Saxophone and guitar: Terry Edwards
- Guitar/vocals: Gary Kemp
- Saxophone and guitar: Steve Norman
- Bass: Erdal Kızılçay
- Bass/vocals: Glen Matlock
- Drums: Clem Burke
- Drums: Steve "Smiley" Barnard
- Piano: Rod Melvin
- Bass/Rhythm Guitar: David Donley
- Vocals: Hannah Berridge
- Vocals: Maggie Ronson
- Vocals: Lisa Ronson
- Vocals: Elizabeth Westwood
- Vocals: Tracie Hunter

== Tours ==
The group undertook a short tour in the UK in September 2014 and a larger scale tour of the UK and Japan in the summer of 2015. In January 2016 they toured the east coast of the United States and followed this with a full tour of US and Canadian cities in the Spring of the same year. Their show consisted of a first half during which they performed David Bowie's classic The Man Who Sold the World and a second half during which early Bowie classics were performed. In March–April 2017 they performed another Bowie album in its entirety, The Rise and Fall of Ziggy Stardust and the Spiders from Mars in Hull and other UK cities. They continue to tour.

== Releases ==
In September 2014, the band released a double A side single comprising the new song "We Are King", written and sung by Steve Norman of Spandau Ballet with a cover of David Bowie's "Holy Holy" sung by Heaven 17’s Glenn Gregory. In June 2015 they released a live recording of their The Man Who Sold the World show, recorded live in London and produced by Tony Visconti.
