= U&I (album) =

Studio album by Leila
- Released: 23 January 2012
- Genre: IDM; experimental pop
- Length: 45:54
- Label: Warp
- Producer: Leila

Leila chronology
Blood Looms and Blooms (2008)	U&I (2012)

Singles from U&I
- 1. "(Disappointed Cloud) Anyway" Released: 2011

Professional ratings
Aggregate scores
Source	Rating
Metacritic	70/100
Review scores
Source	Rating
AllMusic	3.5/5 stars
Beats Per Minute	68/100
Clash	8/10
Fact	2.5/5
The Guardian	2/5 stars
MusicOMH	3.5/5 stars
NME	3.5/5 stars
Pitchfork	6.2/10
Resident Advisor	4.0/5

U&I is the fourth studio album by electronic music artist Leila, released by Warp in 2012. It features contributions from Mt. Sims.

== Critical reception ==
At Metacritic, which assigns a weighted average score out of 100 to reviews from mainstream critics, the album received an average score of 70% based on 17 reviews, indicating "generally favorable reviews".

Heather Phares of AllMusic gave the album 3.5 stars out of 5, calling it "a set of songs that are as dense and direct as her previous album was elaborate and enveloping." Mischa Pearlman of Clash gave the album an 8 out of 10, saying, "Intense and claustrophobic, it's a surprisingly revelatory record that captures the highs and lows of human experience and existence." Stephane Girard of Resident Advisor gave the album a 4.0 out of 5 and described it as "Leila's most gripping work to date."

== Track listing ==
No.	Title	Length
1.	"Of One"	0:59
2.	"Activate I"	2:29
3.	"All of This"	3:27
4.	"Welcome to Your Life"	3:53
5.	"In Consideration"	5:10
6.	"Eight"	2:59
7.	"(Disappointed Cloud) Anyway"	3:05
8.	"Interlace"	1:21
9.	"Colony Collapse Disorder"	3:01
10.	"Boudica"	5:56
11.	"In Motion Slow"	4:47
12.	"U&I"	3:34
13.	"Forasmuch"	5:17

Japanese edition bonus track
No.	Title	Length
14.	"See Ess"	2:57

== Personnel ==
Credits adapted from liner notes.

- Leila – production
- Mt. Sims – vocals (3, 4, 5, 7, 9, 12)
