= Blood Looms and Blooms =

Studio album by Leila
- Released: 7 July 2008
- Length: 54:51
- Label: Warp
- Producer: Leila

Leila chronology
Courtesy of Choice (2000)	Blood Looms and Blooms (2008)	U&I (2012)

Singles from Blood Looms and Blooms
- 1. "Mettle" Released: 21 April 2008; 2. "Deflect" Released: 23 June 2008

Professional ratings
Aggregate scores
Source	Rating
Metacritic	73/100
Review scores
Source	Rating
AllMusic	4/5 stars
Cokemachineglow	82%
Drowned in Sound	8/10
The Guardian	3/5 stars
Pitchfork	8.0/10
PopMatters	8/10 stars
URB	2.5/5 stars

Blood Looms and Blooms is the third studio album by electronic music artist Leila, released by Warp in 2008. It peaked at number 33 on the UK Dance Albums Chart.

== Critical reception ==
At Metacritic, which assigns a weighted average score out of 100 to reviews from mainstream critics, the album received an average score of 73% based on 14 reviews, indicating "generally favorable reviews".

PopMatters placed it at number 5 on the "Best Electronic(a) Albums of 2008" list. AllMusic listed it as one of their favourite electronic albums of 2008. Gilles Peterson named it the 16th best album of 2008.

== Track listing ==
No.	Title	Length
1.	"Mollie"	5:20
2.	"Time to Blow"	3:08
3.	"Little Acorns"	3:29
4.	"Daisies, Cats and Spacemen"	4:26
5.	"Mettle"	4:24
6.	"Teases Me"	3:31
7.	"Carplos"	4:21
8.	"The Exotics"	3:46
9.	"Deflect"	4:23
10.	"Norwegian Wood"	3:34
11.	"Lush Dolphins"	4:03
12.	"Ur Train"	2:37
13.	"Young Ones"	3:23
14.	"Why Should I?"	4:27

iTunes edition bonus track
No.	Title	Length
15.	"You Can Dance... If You Want 2"	3:51

Japanese edition bonus track
No.	Title	Length
15.	"Oddity 01"	5:01

== Personnel ==
Credits adapted from liner notes.

- Leila – production
- Terry Hall – vocals (2, 14)
- Khemahl Richardson – vocals (3)
- Thaon Richardson – vocals (3)
- Roya Arab – vocals (4)
- Andy Cox – guitar (5)
- Justin Percival – guitar (5)
- Luca Santucci – vocals (6, 10, 12)
- Seaming To – vocals (8)
- Martina Topley-Bird – vocals (9, 14)
- Lance Shepherd – guitar (9)
- Zan Lyons – cello (13)
- Sabina Doobay – clarinet (13)
- Kweku Aacht – clarinet (13)

== Charts ==
Chart	Peak position
UK Dance Albums (OCC)	33
