= Genesis Revisited II =

2012 studio album by Steve Hackett

Studio album by Steve Hackett
- Released: 22 October 2012
- Recorded: 2011–12
- Genre: Progressive rock
- Length: 2:24:48
- Label: Inside Out Music
- Producer: Steve Hackett, Roger King

Steve Hackett chronology
Beyond the Shrouded Horizon (2011)	Genesis Revisited II (2012)	Genesis Revisited II: Selection (2013)

Professional ratings
Review scores
Source	Rating
AllMusic	2.5/5 stars
Ultimate Classic Rock	(7/10)

Genesis Revisited II is the 22nd studio album by musician Steve Hackett, released on 22 October 2012 by Inside Out Music label. It is a sequel to his 1996 album Genesis Revisited and largely consists of reworked versions of songs originally by Genesis with a variety of guest vocalists.

== Track listing ==
All tracks are written by Tony Banks, Mike Rutherford, Peter Gabriel, Steve Hackett, and Phil Collins, except where noted. Names in parentheses are the vocalists.

Disc one
No.	Title	Writer(s)	Original album	Length
1.	"The Chamber of 32 Doors" (Nad Sylvan)		The Lamb Lies Down on Broadway	6:00
2.	"Horizons"		Foxtrot	1:41
3.	"Supper's Ready" (Mikael Åkerfeldt, Simon Collins, Conrad Keely, Steve Hackett, Francis Dunnery)		Foxtrot	23:35
4.	"The Lamia" (Nik Kershaw)		The Lamb Lies Down on Broadway	7:47
5.	"Dancing with the Moonlit Knight" (Francis Dunnery)		Selling England by the Pound	8:10
6.	"Fly on a Windshield" (Gary O'Toole)		The Lamb Lies Down on Broadway	2:54
7.	"Broadway Melody of 1974" (Gary O'Toole)		The Lamb Lies Down on Broadway	2:23
8.	"The Musical Box" (Nad Sylvan)		Nursery Cryme	10:57
9.	"Can-Utility and the Coastliners" (Steven Wilson)		Foxtrot	5:50
10.	"Please Don't Touch"	S. Hackett	Please Don't Touch!	4:03
Total length:				73:20

Disc two
No.	Title	Writer(s)	Original album	Length
1.	"Blood on the Rooftops" (Gary O'Toole)	S. Hackett, Collins	Wind & Wuthering	6:56
2.	"The Return of the Giant Hogweed" (Neal Morse)		Nursery Cryme	8:46
3.	"Entangled" (Amanda Lehmann, Jakko Jakszyk)	S. Hackett, Banks	A Trick of the Tail	6:35
4.	"Eleventh Earl of Mar" (Nad Sylvan, Gary O'Toole)	Banks, S. Hackett, Rutherford	Wind & Wuthering	7:51
5.	"Ripples" (Amanda Lehmann)	Rutherford, Banks	A Trick of the Tail	8:14
6.	"Unquiet Slumbers for the Sleepers..."	S. Hackett, Rutherford	Wind & Wuthering	2:12
7.	"...In That Quiet Earth"	S. Hackett, Rutherford, Banks, Collins	Wind & Wuthering	4:47
8.	"Afterglow" (John Wetton, Amanda Lehmann)	Banks	Wind & Wuthering	4:09
9.	"A Tower Struck Down"	John Hackett, S. Hackett	Voyage of the Acolyte	4:45
10.	"Camino Royale" (Steve Hackett)	S. Hackett, Nick Magnus	Highly Strung	6:19
11.	"Shadow of the Hierophant" (Amanda Lehmann)	S. Hackett, Rutherford	Voyage of the Acolyte	10:45
Total length:				71:28

== Personnel ==
- Steve Hackett – guitars, vocals (disc 1, track 3 – V: "Willow Farm"; disc 2, track 10)
- Mikael Åkerfeldt – vocals (disc 1, track 3 – I: "Lover's Leap" & IV: "How Dare I Be So Beautiful?")
- Nad Sylvan – vocals (disc 1, track 1 & 8; disc 2, track 4)
- Nik Kershaw – vocals (disc 1, track 4)
- Conrad Keely – vocals (disc 1, track 3 – III: "Ikhnaton and Itsacon and Their Band of Merry Men")
- Amanda Lehmann – guitar, vocals (disc 2, tracks 3, 5, 8 & 11)
- Francis Dunnery – guitar, vocals (disc 1, tracks 3 – VII: "As Sure As Eggs Is Eggs (Aching Men's Feet)" & 5)
- Steven Wilson – guitar (disc 2, track 11), vocals (disc 1, track 9)
- Jakko Jakszyk – guitar, vocals (disc 2, track 3)
- Roine Stolt – guitar (disc 2, track 2)
- Steve Rothery – guitar (disc 1, track 4)
- Djabe – (Ferenc Kovács – trumpet, violin, vocals, Attila Égerházi – guitar, percussion, Zoltán Kovács – piano, keyboards, Tamás Barabás – bass guitar, Szilárd Banai – drums) : (disc 2, track 10)
- Roger King – keyboards (disc 1, tracks 1 & 3–10; disc 2, tracks 1–11)
- Simon Collins (Phil Collins' son) – keyboard, vocals (disc 1, track 3 – II: "The Guaranteed Eternal Sanctuary Man" & VI: "Apocalypse in 9/8")
- Dave Kerzner – keyboards (disc 1, track 3)
- Nick Magnus – keyboards (disc 2, track 10)
- Neal Morse – keyboards, vocals (disc 2, track 2)
- Jo Lehmann – backing vocals
- Dick Driver – double bass (disc 1, tracks 1 & 10; disc 2, tracks 1 & 9)
- John Wetton – bass, guitar, vocals (disc 2, track 8)
- Phil Mulford – bass (disc 2, tracks 1 & 8)
- Nick Beggs – bass, Chapman stick (disc 1, track 9; disc 2, tracks 4, 7 & 11)
- Lee Pomeroy – bass, Chapman stick (disc 1, tracks 3–8; disc 2, track 2)
- Gary O'Toole – drums, percussion (disc 1, tracks 1, 4, & 6–10; disc 2, tracks 1, 2, 4–11), vocals (disc 1, track 6 & 7; disc 2, track 1, 4)
- Jeremy Stacey – drums (disc 1, track 3 & 5)
- Rachel Ford – cello (disc 1, track 1; disc 2, tracks 1 & 9)
- Christine Townsend – violin, viola (disc 1, track 1 & 9; disc 2, tracks 1 & 9)
- John Hackett – flute (disc 1, tracks 1, 4, 5 & 10; disc 2, tracks 2 & 9)
- Rob Townsend – saxophone, flute and blown sundries (disc 1, tracks 5, 8 & 9; disc 2, tracks 1, 7, 10 & 11)
- Photographic artwork by Maurizio and Angéla Vicedomini

== Genesis Revisited II: Selection ==
Genesis Revisited II: Selection

Studio album by Steve Hackett
- Released: 10 May 2013 (Germany, Switzerland, Finland, Austria, Norway, Australia, New Zealand); 13 May 2013 (UK); 14 May 2013 (Spain, Italy); 15 May 2013 (Sweden, Hungary)
- Recorded: 2011–12
- Genre: Progressive rock
- Label: Inside Out Music
- Producer: Steve Hackett, Roger King

Steve Hackett chronology
Genesis Revisited II (2012)	Genesis Revisited II: Selection (2013)	Genesis Revisited: Live at Hammersmith (2013)

Genesis Revisited II: Selection is a selection of songs that appear on the 2012 cover album by musician Steve Hackett. It was released in May 2013 by Inside Out Music. It includes eight of the songs included on the original album, plus a previously unreleased version of "Carpet Crawlers"; featuring former Genesis vocalist Ray Wilson.

== Track listing ==
All tracks are written by Tony Banks, Phil Collins, Peter Gabriel, Steve Hackett, and Mike Rutherford, except where noted.

No.	Title	Writer(s)	Original album	Length
1.	"Carpet Crawlers" (Ray Wilson)		The Lamb Lies Down on Broadway	5:13
2.	"Eleventh Earl of Mar" (Nad Sylvan)	Banks, Hackett, Rutherford	Wind & Wuthering	7:51
3.	"The Lamia" (Nik Kershaw)		The Lamb Lies Down on Broadway	7:47
4.	"Dancing with the Moonlit Knight" (Francis Dunnery)		Selling England by the Pound	8:17
5.	"Entangled" (Jakko Jakszyk, Amanda Lehmann)	Hackett, Banks	A Trick of the Tail	6:34
6.	"Shadow of the Hierophant" (Amanda Lehmann)	Hackett, Rutherford	Voyage of the Acolyte	10:43
7.	"Can-Utility and the Coastliners" (Steven Wilson)		Foxtrot	5:50
8.	"Afterglow" (John Wetton)	Banks	Wind & Wuthering	4:09
9.	"Blood on the Rooftops" (Gary O'Toole)	Hackett, Collins	Wind & Wuthering	6:58
Total length:				1:03:22 (63:22)

== "Selection" personnel ==
- Lee Pomeroy – bass (track 1, 3, 4)
- Ray Wilson – vocals (track 1)
- Nick Beggs – bass (track 2, 6, 7)
- Nad Sylvan – vocals (track 2)
- John Hackett – flute (track 3, 4)
- Steve Rothery – guitar (track 3)
- Nick Kershaw – vocals (track 3)
- Jeremy Stacey – drums (track 4)
- Rob Townsend – soprano saxophone (track 4, 6, 9), whistle (track 4, 6, 7)
- Francis Dunnery – vocals (track 4)
- Amanda Lehmann – harmony vocals (track 5, 8), vocals (track 6)
- Jakko Jakszyk – vocals (track 5)
- Steven Wilson – guitar (track 6), vocals (track 7)
- Christine Townsend – violin, viola (track 7, 9)
- Phil Mulford – bass (track 8, 9)
- John Wetton – vocals (track 8)
- Rachel Ford – cello (track 9)
- Dick Driver – double bass (track 9)
- Gary O'Toole – vocals (track 9)

== Charts ==
Chart (2012)	Peak position
Belgian Albums (Ultratop Wallonia)	61
Dutch Albums (Album Top 100)	52
French Albums (SNEP)	119
German Albums (Offizielle Top 100)	32
Italian Albums (FIMI)	48
Scottish Albums (OCC)	19
Swiss Albums (Schweizer Hitparade)	80
UK Albums (OCC)	24
UK Rock & Metal Albums (OCC)	3
