= Londinium (album) =

Studio album by Archive
- Released: 23 September 1996
- Genre: Trip hop, alternative hip hop, electronica, downtempo
- Length: 60:38
- Label: Island
- Producer: Archive, Pete Barraclough

Archive chronology
Londinium (1996)	Take My Head (1999)

Professional ratings
Review scores
Source	Rating
Allmusic	3/5 stars
The Independent	(Mixed)
Muzik	3.5/5 stars

Londinium is the debut album by London-based trip hop band Archive. The title is taken from the Roman name for London. Roya Arab is the main vocalist throughout the album, and Rosko John provides rapping. "Skyscraper" uses a sample from "Mmm Skyscraper... I Love You" by Underworld. In addition, Karl Hyde, from Underworld, plays bass on the track "Headspace". "Londinium" was remixed by Kevin Shields and released as a 12″.

== Track listing ==
1. "Old Artist" – 4:04
2. "All Time" – 3:51
3. "So Few Words" – 6:12
4. "Headspace" * – 4:13
5. "Darkroom" – 4:31
6. "Londinium" – 5:19
7. "Man Made" – 4:37
8. "Nothing Else" – 4:37
9. "Skyscraper" – 4:24
10. "Parvaneh (Butterfly)" – 3:50
11. "Beautiful World" – 6:36
12. "Organ Song" – 2:23
13. "Last Five" – 5:49

* Ubiquitous Wife Remix

The album contains a hidden track, which begins about 39 seconds after the end of "Last Five"; it runs 1:24, while the actual song "Last Five" runs 3:47.

== Personnel ==
- Artwork By [Cd Design & Tray] - Mat Cook Intro
- Initial creative agent - Ady Lloyd
- Bass - Karl Hyde (track 4)
- Cello - Julia Palmer
- Drums [Additional Drums] - Matheu Martin (tracks: 3)
- Engineer - Pete Barraclough
- Flute - Pete Barraclough (tracks: 2, 4, 13)
- French Horn - Jane Hanna (tracks: 12)
- Guitar - Karl Hyde (tracks 4, 5, 6, 13), Pete Barraclough (track 12), Steve Taylor (track 11)
- Mixed By - Neil McLellan
- Mixed By [Assistant] - Pat McGovern
- Photography - Andy Earl
- Producer, Mixed By - Archive
- Triangle [Guest Trianglist] - Anita Hill
- Violin - Ali Keeler (tracks 1, 6, 7, 12)
- Vocals - Roya Arab
- Vocals [Additional] - Jane Wall (tracks: 11), Siobhan Sian (track 11)
- Vocals [Rap] - Rosko John
- Written-By - D. Keeler (music: all tracks), D. Griffiths (music: tracks 3, 5, 7, 9, 10, 13), A. Keeler (music: tracks 1, 12), R. John (lyrics: tracks 3, 5, 6, 9, 11, 13), R. Arab (lyrics: tracks 2 to 6, 8, 10, 13)

Track 9 contains a sample from Underworld's "Mmm Skyscraper I Love You".
