= Mondo Bongo (disambiguation) =

Mondo Bongo is the fourth album by The Boomtown Rats.

Mondo Bongo may also refer to:

- "Mondo Bongo", a song by Joe Strummer and The Mescaleros from their album Global a Go-Go, which was used in the film Mr. & Mrs. Smith
- Los Mondo Bongo, a band formed by Mike Peters, Derek Forbes, Steve Harris, and members of The Mescaleros
