= Birdpen =

English musical duo

BirdPen is an English musical duo formed by Dave Pen (also guitarist and singer in Archive) and Mike Bird.

They released their fifth studio album, There's Something Wrong With Everything, in 2018.

== Members ==
- Dave Pen: vocals, guitar, keyboards
- Mike Bird: guitar, keyboards

== History ==
Founded in 2003, BirdPen released several EPs in limited editions between 2005 and 2006. Those EPs were followed by the Breaking Precedent EP' in 2008, and by the On/Off/Safety/Danger LP in 2009, with critics comparing them to Radiohead Following the release of their album, BirdPen served as an opening act of the Archive's Controlling Crowds tour in Europe.

BirdPen came back in 2012 with their second album, named Global Lows. Their third record In The Company of Imaginary Friends was released in 2015 on J.A.R Records / Fintage Music. The band's fourth album, O' Mighty Vision, was released on 26 August 2016.

The 2012 album Global Lows was nominated for 'Best European Independent Album' at the IMPALA awards.

The fifth BirdPen album, There's Something Wrong With Everything, was released in 2018.

== Discography ==
=== Discussing Robots – Dig That Hole EP (2003) ===
- "Discussing Robots" – 3:33
- "Dig That Hole" – 5:16

This first EP was released on 7" vinyl.

=== Fake Kid EP (2005) ===
1. "Fake Kid" – 5:43
2. "A Round Of Applause for A Great Disaster" – 4:41
3. "Huron" – 5:46
4. "10,000 Dead Stars" (CD-ROM video)

=== Be Yourself EP (2006) ===
1. "Be Yourself" – 3:55
2. "Slow" – 4:54
3. "Sunlight Darkening" – 5:49

=== One in Fifty-Four EP (2007) ===
1. "A Good Start" – 0:48
2. "Lost Control" – 3:21
3. "I'm Never Leaving Home Again" – 4:43
4. "Put You Back Together" – 3:44
5. "One in Fifty-Four" – 5:43
6. "Home" – 0:53

This EP is a limited edition of 100.

=== Breaking Precedent EP (2008) ===
1. "Breaking Precedent" (Radio Edit) – 3:27
2. "Machines Live Like Ordinary People" – 4:40
3. "Man The Thinker" – 4:05
4. "Implode and Fold" – 3:21
5. "Breaking Precedent" – 5:43

This EP is available on most of the legal download websites.

=== On/Off/Safety/Danger (2009) ===
1. "Breaking Precedent" – 4:45
2. "Airspace" – 5:52
3. "Off" – 4:24
4. "Machines Live Like Ordinary People" – 4:35
5. "Man On Fire" – 5:18
6. "The Ghost Bird" – 2:47
7. "Admiral Red" – 8:01
8. "Slow" – 4:53
9. "The Bird and The Antennas" – 1:42
10. "Thorns" – 5:28
11. "Cold Blood" – 6:34

=== Global Lows (2012) ===
1. "No Escape" – 6:46
2. "Nature Regulate" – 6:05
3. "Saver Destroyer" – 3:54
4. "Mule" – 4:29
5. "Sorrow" – 5:24
6. "Only The Names Change" – 7:12
7. "Missing Sun" – 3:53
8. "A Thousand Followers" – 5:28
9. "The Bridge" – 4:03
10. "The Safety in Numbers Is Now Zero" – 7:04

=== In The Company of Imaginary Friends (2015) ===
1. "Like a Mountain" – 5:36
2. "Somewhere" – 4:24
3. "Into The Blacklight" – 4:50
4. "T.C.T.T.Y.A" – 6:22
5. "Lost It" – 5:45
6. "Lake's Demand for an Interlude" – 1:49
7. "No Place Like Drone" – 9:41
8. "Alive" – 4:18
9. "Lifeline" – 4:48
10. "Cell Song" – 2:51
11. "Equal Parts Hope and Dread" – 3:36

=== O' Mighty Vision (2016) ===
1. "O' Mighty Vision" – 5:48
2. "The Chairman" – 3:56
3. "Tookit" – 4:11
4. "The Solution is the Route of All My Problems" – 12:23
5. "Trust" – 6:15
6. "Traitors" – 5:12
7. "Dance to the End" – 5:26
8. "The Underground" – 5:38

=== All Function One (2021) ===
1. "Function" – 5:24
2. "Life in Design" – 4:20
3. "Modern Junk"
4. "Shakes"
5. "Seat 35"
6. "Blackhole"
7. "Flames"
8. "Otherside"
9. "Changes"
10. "Universe"
11. "Invisible" – 4:05
12. "Undone"
