= Controlling Crowds =

Studio album by Archive
- Released: 30 March 2009
- Genre: Trip hop
- Length: 1:18:02

Archive chronology
Lights (2006)	Controlling Crowds (2009)	Controlling Crowds - Part IV (2009)

Professional ratings
Review scores
Source	Rating
Allmusic	3.5/5 stars

Controlling Crowds (Parts I-III) is the sixth studio album by the British trip hop, progressive and alternative rock group Archive. It was released worldwide on 30 March 2009.

== Release ==
The album consists of three parts:

1. Part I: Controlling Crowds; Bullets; Words on Signs; Dangervisit; Quiet Time
2. Part II: Collapse / Collide; Clones; Bastardised Ink; Kings of Speed; Whore
3. Part III: Chaos; Razed to the Ground; Funeral

Initially, the band wanted to include a fourth part. It was later released as Controlling Crowds – Part IV on 19 October 2009. Both albums were released on the same day as a double CD under the name Controlling Crowds - The Complete Edition Parts I–IV.

== In popular culture ==
The second song on the album, "Bullets", was used in the January 2013 teaser for the video game Cyberpunk 2077.

== Track listing ==
CD 1 :

1. "Controlling Crowds" (10:09)
2. "Bullets" (5:54)
3. "Words on Signs" (4:00)
4. "Dangervisit" (7:37)
5. "Quiet Time" (5:55)
6. "Collapse/Collide" (9:12)
7. "Clones" (5:00)
8. "Bastardised Ink" (3:34)
9. "Kings of Speed" (4:22)
10. "Whore" (4:15)
11. "Chaos" (5:28)
12. "Razed to the Ground" (5:22)
13. "Funeral" (7:19)

CD 2 (limited edition) :

1. "Killing All Movement" (6:22)
2. "Children They Feed" (3:06)
3. "Day That You Go" (3:49)
4. "Neatly Folded" (3:18)
5. "Bullets" (video)

== Charts ==
Chart (2009)	Peak position
Belgian Albums (Ultratop Wallonia)	10
French Albums (SNEP)	7
German Albums (Offizielle Top 100)	61
Polish Albums (ZPAV)	16
Swiss Albums (Schweizer Hitparade)	7

=== Year-end charts ===
Chart (2009)	Controlling Crowds
French Albums (SNEP)	160

== Certifications ==
Region	Certification	Certified units/sales
Poland (ZPAV)	Gold	10,000^{*}
^{*} Sales figures based on certification alone.
