= Jonathan Noyce =

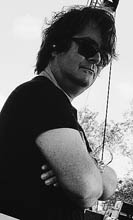

Background information
- Born: Jonathan Mark Thomas Noyce; 15 July 1971 (age 55); Sutton Coldfield, Warwickshire, England
- Genres: Progressive rock, folk rock, hard rock, electronic
- Occupations: Musician, songwriter, producer
- Instruments: bass guitar, guitar, keyboards, drums
- Years active: 1993 – present
- Labels: RandM, Fuel 2000, Chrysalis, Eagle, Roadrunner, EMI, Capital, Island

Jonathan Mark Thomas Noyce (born 15 July 1971) is an English musician. He is primarily a bass guitar player. Noyce is known for being a member of British rock group Jethro Tull for 12 years, and also for his collaborations with guitarist Gary Moore, film composer Daniel Pemberton, the band Archive and French artist Mylène Farmer. In 2018 he was awarded an ARAM by the Royal Academy of Music.

== Early life and education ==
Jonathan Noyce was born in Sutton Coldfield, Warwickshire. He grew up in the cathedral close of Lichfield Cathedral where his father, Peter, was choirmaster and assistant organist. His mother Jane was a town planner. His first instrument was piano, later also drums and guitar which became a stepping stone to the bass guitar. In his teens Jonathan studied formally, principally classical percussion, which included classical snare drum, timpani and xylophone, also classical contrabass. His first paid gig with the bass was at the age of 18. He is a graduate of the Royal Academy of Music in London.

== Career ==
=== Early career ===
Jonathan Noyce started working professionally whilst studying at the Royal Academy of Music in London. During this time he began to make a name as a studio musician, primarily with DJ Dave Lee, consequently enjoying his first commercial success with the British pop group Take That, for whom he supplied bass in the studio in 1993.

In 1993, Jonathan's path crossed with that of former Jethro Tull band member Dee Palmer whilst working on an orchestral version of The Beatles Sgt. Pepper's Lonely Hearts Club Band, which was recorded at Abbey Road Studios with an orchestra from the Royal Academy of Music. As a direct result Jonathan was recruited to play on Jethro Tull guitarist Martin Barre's 1995 album The Meeting. Jethro Tull frontman Ian Anderson subsequently asked Noyce to join him on his Divinities world tour later that year. Noyce joined Jethro Tull in August 1995 following the departure of Dave Pegg.

=== Ongoing career ===
Outside of Jethro Tull, Noyce had a long establishment with guitarist Gary Moore, joining him on the Old New Ballads Blues album, One Night in Dublin: A Tribute to Phil Lynott, a DVD/CD recording of the concert to commemorate the life of Phil Lynott which featured members of Thin Lizzy, and the release of Moore's final recorded show Live at Montreux 2010. In 2010 Noyce re-united with Gary Moore for his Summer of Rock shows throughout Europe. This band also included drummer and friend Darrin Mooney and, following a 21-year hiatus, keyboard and guitar player Neil Carter. This Celtic-Rock project came to an end with the sudden death of Moore on 6 February 2011.

In 2007 Noyce joined the UK band Archive.

On 1st and 2nd May 2009 Noyce played at two sold-out concerts at Hampton Court Palace in Surrey, UK where Rick Wakeman performed the music from his progressive rock concept album 'The Six Wives of Henry VIII'. The two shows were recorded; a 2-CD copy of which were available for attendees to purchase at the end of each performance. Wakeman said that the general release CD and subsequent video were from the second night's concert, with no overdubs or editing.

In 2010 Noyce had commercial successes with the release of French Mylène Farmer's album Bleu Noir, for which he supplied all the bass guitar tracks. He played for Love Amongst Ruin's debut gig at Eurosonic Festival in January 2010.

In 2012 Noyce joined his old Jethro Tull bandmate Martin Barre for live shows across Europe.

In 2013 Noyce played on Martin Barre's solo album Away With Words. The same year he had been joined Sixto Rodriguez for a run of shows that included the Montreux Jazz Festival and Glastonbury Festival.

In 2014 Noyce joined the Gentle Giant offshoot band Three Friends, featuring former members Gary Green and Malcolm Mortimore. Other work includes playing on the soundtracks to the films I Am Ali and The Man from U.N.C.L.E., the later with Daniel Pemberton. Archive released a film, Axiom, and returned to Montreux Jazz Festival to perform the soundtrack live.

In 2015 Archive's album Restriction features Noyce on bass guitars.

In 2016 Noyce played bass on the soundtrack of the film King Arthur: Legend of the Sword by Guy Ritchie. The same year, he played on the album The False Foundation by Archive.

In 2019, Noyce performed on the soundtrack of the film Yesterday.

== Style and equipment ==
Noyce likes to play a style which he calls 'stealth bass': "you can't hear it, but you feel it." He also described the bass guitar as his bands "secret weapon", due to its ability to provide rhythm as well as melody.

His bass guitars have included a Yamaha BB1100s, a 1960 Fender Precision, a Music Man StingRay and three custom-made Wal. Noyce is currently using a Yamaha BBP34 as his main instrument.

His pedalboard was built and designed by Custom Chain Pedal Systems and includes a Boss OC2 custom modification by Pete Cornish, an Audio Kitchen Big Trees pre-amp, an RMI Basswitch switching unit, three distortion units and Lehle Mono volume and Sunday Driver buffer pedals. His live rig features a Skrydstrup custom preamp. In the studio he uses Radial Firefly, JDV and JDI DI units. He uses the Big Cheese fuzzbox from Lovetone.

In addition to bass guitars, Noyce has also used the Minimoog and Moog Taurus synthesizers for bass.
