= Courtesy of Choice =

Studio album by Leila
- Released: 2000
- Genre: Electronica
- Length: 58:13
- Label: XL Recordings
- Producer: Leila

Leila chronology
Like Weather (1998)	Courtesy of Choice (2000)	Blood Looms and Blooms (2008)

Singles from Courtesy of Choice
- 1. "Sodastream" Released: 1999

Professional ratings
Review scores
Source	Rating
AllMusic	2.5/5 stars
Exclaim!	favorable
Hot Press	favorable
The Irish Times	favorable

Courtesy of Choice is the second studio album by electronic music artist Leila, released by XL Recordings in 2000. It features vocal contributions from Roya Arab, Donna Paul, and Luca Santucci.

== Critical reception ==
Denise Benson of Exclaim! called the album "creative, highly listenable, unpretentious electronic music at its best." Peter Murphy of Hot Press described it as "a master class in designer distortion and dynamic range." Jim Carroll of The Irish Times wrote that "Leila's warm and bittersweet electronica entices and enthralls in slow, swinging, stinging sweeps," stating that "she prefers to use colour and shade and fragments of songs rather than simply relying on monochrome beats and moods." In a mixed review, Tim DiGravina of AllMusic stated that "the material isn't memorable and it doesn't take enough of a stance in any one genre to make much of an impact [...] the overall effect is more of a drugged stupor than the desired atmospheric soundscape."

NME named it the 38th best album of 2000.

== Track listing ==
No.	Title	Length
1.	"Brave"	6:08
2.	"Work"	3:42
3.	"From Before... What?"	3:58
4.	"Sodastream"	5:51
5.	"Gush Goog"	3:21
6.	"To Win Her Love"	4:13
7.	"Thanks, Mr. Jones"	5:47
8.	"To Tell a Lie"	3:14
9.	"I Won't Forget"	5:12
10.	"Be Clowns"	4:01
11.	"Different Time"	4:58
12.	"Different Time (Reprise)"	2:43
13.	"Young Ones"	5:00

The vinyl version contains an additional track, titled "Relax the Pleasure Dome", between "From Before... What?" and "Sodastream".

== Personnel ==
Credits adapted from liner notes.

- Leila – production
- Tim Giles – drums
- Benet Walsh – clarinet
- Luca Santucci – vocals (on "Brave", "Sodastream", "To Win Her Love", and "To Tell a Lie")
- Donna Paul – vocals (on "Work" and "I Won't Forget")
- Roya Arab – vocals (on "Different Time")
