= Jade Ell =

Swedish singer and songwriter

Jade Ell is a Swedish singer / songwriter based in Stockholm, Sweden. Ell has written songs that have been recorded by RBD, Diego Boneta, Fey, Sanne Salomonsen, Melissa Tkautz, Margaret Berger, Pandora, Yuki, Natacha and Sandra. She has also helped with the translation of Douglas Pashley's musical Spin.

== Discography ==
- Ell released her debut album Promises and Prayers throughout Europe on the Edel Records label. Her first single, "Got to Let You Go", co-written with Jörgen Elofsson, was named Record of the Week in the UK by The Tip Sheet (Issue #290, February 11 1999). It also reached #1 on P3 Sweden, and #3 on P3 Denmark, where she was also nominated as Best Newcomer on their Pop Shop Awards show.
- Her second album, Methods (of a hostage negotiator) (EMI DK), was a collaboration with Swedish producer Mats Hedström. Two tracks from this album were featured in the film Den store dag [The Big day]. Ell and Hedström subsequently formed a duet called Tiny Tornado, whose premiere album Echoes and Rhymes was released in March 2013.
- Ell's third solo album, "Mourning This Morning" when she uses "Ellen" as her artist name, represents her first effort as a producer. Ell has formed a new band, Band of Jade, featuring herself on piano/vocals, with Jan Hellman (bass guitar/Chapman Stick) and Marcus Bouquelon (drums).

Ell is a member of the Swedish artrock band Xanima, and gives individual lessons and workshops at various music schools in Europe.
