= Controlling Crowds – Part IV =

Studio album by Archive
- Released: 19 October 2009
- Genre: Trip hop, alternative rock
- Length: 48:55

Archive chronology
Controlling Crowds (2009)	Controlling Crowds – Part IV (2009)	With Us Until You're Dead (2012)

Controlling Crowds – Part IV is the seventh studio album by the London-based trip hop progressive and alternative band Archive. It was released worldwide on 19 October 2009.

This is the sequel of Controlling Crowds which contains parts I to III. Both albums were released on the same day as a double CD under the name Controlling Crowds - The Complete Edition Parts I–IV.

== Track listing ==
1. "Pills" - 4:11
2. "Lines" - 6:04
3. "The Empty Bottle" - 7:03
4. "Remove" - 4:06
5. "Come on Get High" - 4:41
6. "Thought Conditioning" - 3:39
7. "The Feeling of Losing Everything" - 4:48
8. "Blood in Numbers" - 3:05
9. "To the End" - 3:55
10. "Pictures" - 3:55
11. "Lunar Bender" - 3:24

== Charts ==
Chart (2009)	Peak position
Belgian Albums (Ultratop Wallonia)	26
French Albums (SNEP)	17
Swiss Albums (Schweizer Hitparade)	21
