= Nad Sylvan =

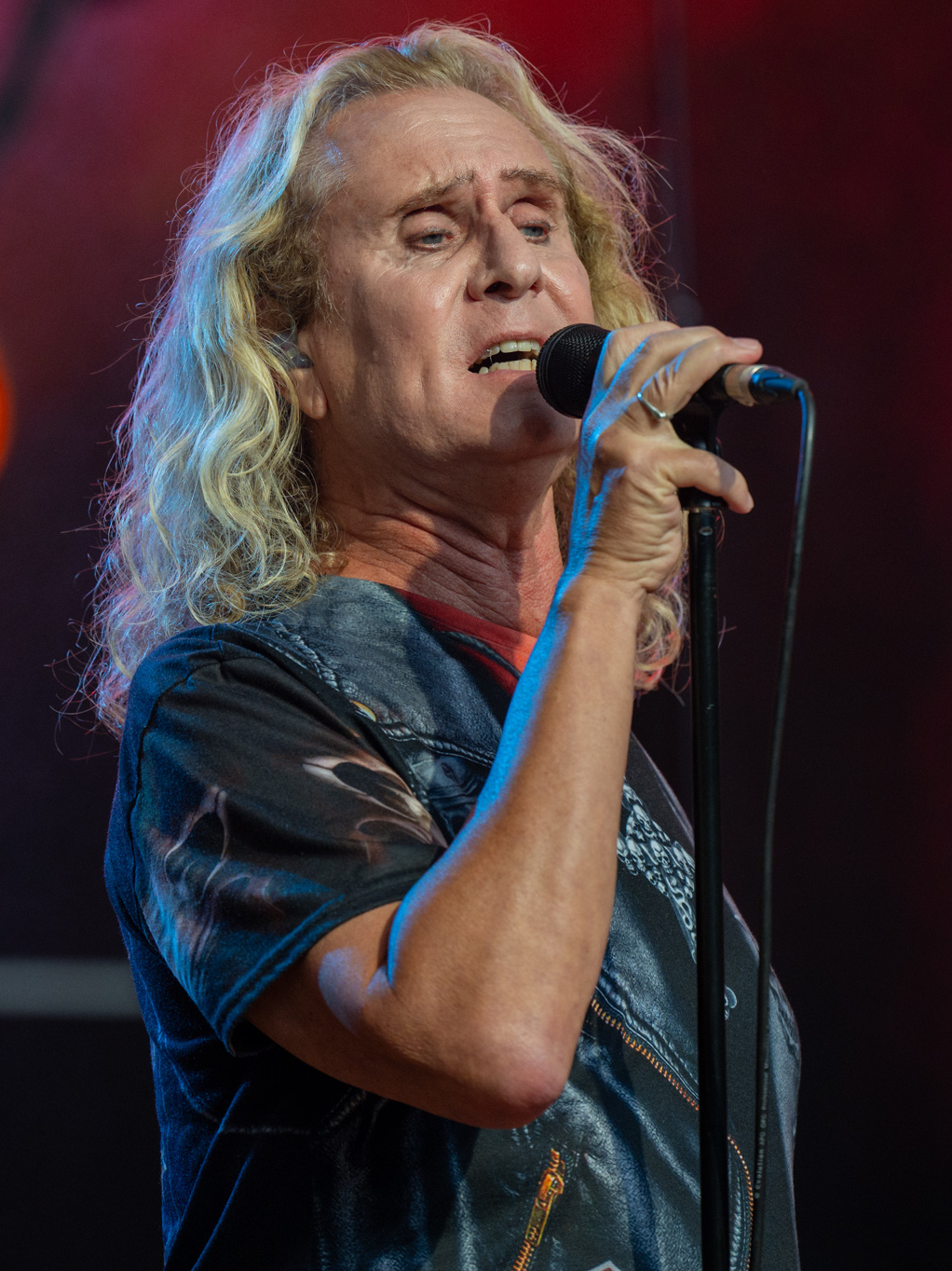
- Sylvan with Steve Hackett in 2024

Background information
- Born: Hugh Erik Stewart; 4 June 1959 (age 67); West Covina, California, U.S.
- Genre: Progressive rock
- Occupations: Singer; musician; songwriter
- Instruments: Vocals; keyboards; guitar
- Label: Inside Out Music
- Website: www.nadsylvan.com

Nad Sylvan (born 4 June 1959) is a U.S. born Swedish progressive rock musician and songwriter, who is currently the vocalist in Steve Hackett’s band Genesis Revisited and has also maintained a solo career and collaborations with several other musicians.

== Background ==
Born Hugh Erik Stewart on June 4, 1959 in West Covina, California, to tennis player Hugh Wright Stewart and Swedish socialite Agnete Sylvan, he showed a keen interest in music from his early years, with an increasing gift for singing and playing piano, keyboards, and guitars.

After drifting through the progressive rock and punk rock eras he signed to “Planet Records” in 1983, releasing the disco single “Midnatt” (“Midnight”), sung in Swedish. He then collaborated with “Hasse Carlsson and the Tectives” as second keyboardist and back up singer, for his first real touring experience in Sweden. After a name change to “One by One”, now with Christopher (his mother had renamed him Christopher after their return to Sweden) as the band´s lead singer, they released two singles,“Dancing Mono” and “Say You Never”. Although enjoying numerous live experiences and TV shows, no album materialised and the band eventually broke up.

Between 1989 and 1996, Stewart remained isolated in his studio, determined to find his own personal style as a musician, eventually releasing his first solo album in 1995, “The Home Recordings”, subsequently re-released in 1999 as “Blue Waters”. A close friend’s tragic suicide in 1997 led to the composition of a mini pop opera tribute, “The Life of a Housewife”, comprising 15 songs. At that time, Christopher decided to change his name to Nad Sylvan. After uploading the album onto mp3.com, interest followed from Michael B. Tretow (ABBA’s audio engineer) and a collaboration began, culminating with many successful live appearances at the “Nalen” in Stockholm and the release of the CD “Sylvanite” in 2003.

In October of that year, Sylvan attended a concert of Canadian Genesis tribute band The Musical Box, touring “Selling England by the Pound” at the Royal Albert Hall. His enthusiasm for the performance led him to the Genesis website/forums where he met Bonamici (aka. Christian Thordin), starting a successful collaboration, “Sylvan and Bonamici”, that led them to the “Unifaun” project. Meanwhile, Sylvan became star reviewer Steve Gilmore’s “Artist of the Year” (December 2003), thanks to his song “Yellow Sky” from “Sylvanite”. In 2008, “Unifaun” was released by “Progress Records” and is now considered a cult album. It was repackaged in 2013 with new album artwork by Claude Martin.

After the “Unifaun” project, Sylvan was discovered by Roine Stolt of The Flower Kings, which led to the birth of the band “Agents of Mercy”. In 2009, Sylvan began touring with the band to promote “The Fading Ghosts of Twilight”. The band toured successfully around Europe and the US and released three albums through to 2011: “Dramarama”, “Power of Two”, (live album with Karmakanic) and “The Black Forest”.

In April 2012, Sylvan caught the attention of Steve Hackett, former guitarist and songwriter of Genesis (1970–1977), who had enjoyed considerable solo success since leaving the band. With the creation of the "Genesis Revisited” project, Sylvan sang on the Genesis Revisited II album, followed by the Hammersmith and the Royal Albert Hall live albums released in 2013 and 2014. Sylvan also began a successful world tour at this time, with “Genesis Revisited” playing theatres and concert halls.

In October 2015, another Genesis Revisited live album/DVD was recorded at the Liverpool Philharmonic Hall, coinciding with the release of his solo album “Courting the Widow” by Inside Out Music (Sony), that was well received by critics and fans alike. Further success followed with “The Bride Said No”, released in May 2017, featuring contributions by virtuoso musicians.

In January 2018, Steve Hackett released his fourth live album with Sylvan as vocalist, recorded at the Birmingham Symphony Hall. Much appreciated and requested, Sylvan took part in many other projects with bands and artists in the prog world.

In July 2019, Sylvan released a new solo album ("The Regal Bastard"), while at the same time touring with Steve Hackett for his seventh year of collaboration on the "Genesis Revisited" project.

Sylvan continued to tour globally with Genesis Revisited during 2023.

== Biography ==
=== The early years (1959–1988) ===
Nad Sylvan was born Hugh Erik Stewart on June 4, 1959 in West Covina, California (USA) to the tennis player Hugh Wright Stewart and 19 year old Swedish socialite Agnete Sylvan. The couple settled in Sweden, but soon Hugh’s father returned to California. After the divorce of his parents, Hugh was renamed Erik Christopher by his mother (1966) and, after adopting his mother's surname too (Sylvan), began the evolution of his artistic name that would later become Nad Sylvan.

From his earliest years Nad was involved with music. At primary school, he often sat by the piano or at the classroom’s harmonium, discovering the cross hand technique and performing songs with the dream of recording and sending his own compositions to Jimi Hendrix.

During this period he was raised by his grandparents, Astrid and Erik Sylvan, who, despite being a little strict with him, encouraged his passion for music. When, aged eleven, he left his grandparents’ house, there was a two year gap in his contact with music and that was when Christopher (as he was now known), discovered his love for horses and riding. He reconnected with music in 1973, becoming the lead singer of his first band, the short-lived and unsuccessful “White Lightning”. In 1975 he fronted “Envoys”, touring Sweden and singing Uriah Heep covers, like “July Morning” and “Easy Living”. He was also influenced by Alice Cooper.

Between 1976 and 1979 Prog Rock became his realm. He could play every kind of keyboard (organ, Minimoog, Elka string synthesiser, Fender Rhodes and Mellotron) without putting aside his deep fondness for singing. His band, “Avenue”, was influenced by Genesis, Yes, Gentle Giant and Camel. Punk rock arrived also on the scene at this time and in 1980 he formed the “Chris Stewart Band”, writing music in the style of Gino Vannelli and Al Jarreau. His interest in various musical genres expanded considerably. He enriched his collection of keyboards with a Yamaha electric Grand Piano (Yamaha CP-80) and a Roland Jupiter-4.

In 1983 Chris signed to Planet Records and released a Disco single, “Midnatt” (Midnight), sung in Swedish. He then joined “Hasse Carlson and the Tectives”, touring Sweden for a year with a repertoire in Swedish. When Hasse left the band, the remaining members changed the name to “One by One” and with Chris as lead singer, released two singles: “Dancing Mono” (written by Chris) and “Say You Never”. No album could be released at that time because the record company had put the band on hold. In Spring 1987 the offer to support two Lionel Richie shows in Stockholm and Gothenburg arrived. However, as the band hadn’t played together for some time, the experience proved disappointing.

=== 1989–2003 ===
From 1989 to 1996 Chris confined himself to his studio, searching for his own style and musical identity and focusing on writing songs. The idea of changing his name from Chris Stewart into something less serious and more captivating came after the release of his first complete album in 1995, “The Home Recordings”, subsequently re-titled “Blue Waters “ and re-released in 1999 as an mp3 album. At this time, Chris was drawn to male artists with female names like Alice Cooper and Marilyn Manson and started to consider the name Nadine. However, he performed a number of successful shows under the name “Sylvan”.

A pivotal transformation in his career came when one of his friends, known as “The Housewife” (because of his penchant for female dresses) committed suicide at the age of 36. Reflecting on the brevity of life, Chris composed a mini pop opera to celebrate him, eventually producing fifteen songs (including an earlier composition, “Strangers”, made with “One by One”) and releasing an album, “The Life of a Housewife”.

Chris started searching for a record company, paying visits to Stockholm and London. That’s when he definitively found the perfect name. While thinking about Nadine, he was asked for his first name and answered “Nad, full name, Nad Sylvan”. Though on that occasion he didn’t earn a record deal, a new era began with this identity. He was contacted by Abba’s audio engineer Michael B. Tretow, who was determined to collaborate with him on some project. Part of their joint venture ended up as a commercial for Swedish corporate “Ericsson”.

In 1999 Nad, considering the internet as the perfect platform for an unsigned artist, uploaded “Housewife” on mp3.com. Meanwhile, one of Nad’s friends, “Pärtan”, and Conny Bloom from “Electric Boys”, were appearing on stage at the “Nalen” in Stockholm. One night Nad was asked to join them on stage to perform “Keep on Running”. It was a great success, with the audience giving Nad a standing ovation, and he became a regular guest on Sunday nights. In 2001 Nad felt inspired to create some heavy music and found himself working on “Sylvanite”, his third album, which surfaced in 2003 on mp3.com.

=== Unifaun and Agents of Mercy ===
Genesis has been Nad Sylvan’s favourite band since 1975. He first saw the band in Stockholm in 1977 on the “Wind & Wuthering” tour, the last one Steve Hackett performed with them. Years later, while browsing an Internet forum, Nad discovered that the Canadian Genesis tribute band The Musical Box was on tour with “Selling England By The Pound”. He attended the concert at the Royal Albert Hall, in October 2003, and was captivated by the accuracy in reproducing an exact replica of the 30 years old show, complete with stage props, costumes and lights.

Again, while browsing an internet forum, Nad met Bonamici, author of a song in perfect Genesis style. Under the name “Sylvan and Bonamici” the two musicians started to produce songs, in the spirit of Genesis, but with their own distinctive stamp, and uploaded them to SoundClick.

Meanwhile Nad, thanks to his song “Yellow Sky” from “Sylvanite”, became Steve Gilmore’s “Artist of the Year”. Gilmore had also praised Bonamici’s work and when he found out that he and Nad were working together, he offered to promote them.

The project was challenging requiring four years in the making. Eventually, Nad Sylvan and Bonamici signed to Progress Records releasing “Unifaun” in 2008, subsequently re-releasing it in 2013, with new artwork by Claude Martin. This is now considered a cult album.

The “Unifaun” album had been out for two months when Nad was contacted by another Swedish Prog guru Roine Stolt from The Flower Kings and they formed "Agents of Mercy”. Sadly, in the midst of recording their debut album, Nad’s mother died in February 2009, leaving him with the greatest sorrow of his life. He proceeded to finish a song that had been playing in his head for more than 10 years and understood then that it had a very special purpose all along. Nad went on to perform “Long Way from Home” at his mother’s funeral.

In September/October 2009, “Agents of Mercy” went on the road with a tour around Europe and the US to promote “The Fading Ghosts Of Twilight”. This was part of the great transformation in Nad’s career, that had started with the “Unifaun” chapter. After the tour he recorded three studio albums with “Agents Of Mercy”, toured Europe and the US a few times and made another trip to “RoSfest” in Gettysburg in 2012.

Because of the difficulties caused by the band’s members being scattered across different parts of the world, “Agents of Mercy” ended that year.

=== Steve Hackett's Genesis Revisited and recent solo albums ===
On 16 April 2012 a call came from Steve Hackett. Steve and Nad had met for the first time in 2009 at a “Night of the Prog” show in Europe. As well as recording several solo albums after he left Genesis, Steve had released also two “Genesis Revisited” albums, in 1996 and 2012, the latter featuring extensive vocal contributions by Nad Sylvan.

Rehearsals for a long “Genesis Revisited” tour started in London in March 2013. The tour covered the US, Europe, and Japan. This was followed by summer festivals in Europe and another tour of 19 shows covering the East coast of the US and back to England for 12 shows, including one at the Royal Albert Hall on October 24.

In October 2015 Nad’s solo album, Courting the Widow, released by Inside Out (Sony), was well received by critics and fans alike, featuring artwork by the painter Claude Martin. The lyrics of the songs also marked the introduction of the Vampirate character.

During the years to 2018, “Genesis Revisited” toured the US several times, performed extensively in South America, Europe and the UK and also appeared in Australia and New Zealand as well as participating in numerous Prog festivals and the “Cruise to the Edge”. In some shows the band was joined by a symphonic orchestra, rendering the Genesis experience even more authentic for the audience.

Nad’s second solo album of the trilogy dedicated to the Vampirate's story, “The Bride Said No”, emerged in May 2017 on the Inside Out label to great success and critical acclaim. The album, with artworks by Marcela Bolivar and Claude Martin, included contributions by an array of famous musicians in the Prog world, such as Steve Hackett, Tony Levin, Guthrie Govan, Doane Perry, Roine Stolt, Nick D'Virgilio and some widely-respected female musicians and singers such as Jade Ell, Tania Doko and Sheona Urquhart. Nad also began a collaboration with Anders Wollbeck, as well as with his old friend Jade Ell. In January 2018 Nad appeared on the fourth live album with Steve Hackett.

In Nad’s seventh year with “Genesis Revisited”, after two cruises for Prog and Rock fans and during an extensive concert tour started in April 2019, Inside Out publishes “The Regal Bastard” (July 2019), third solo album concluding the tale of the Vampirate. It features a collaboration with British guitarist Guthrie Govan (on the track "I Am The Sea") and many other illustrious musicians from the world of Prog.

== Discography ==
Complete discography:

=== Solo albums ===
- 1995 – The Home Recordings – (1999 reissued as Blue Waters as digital download only, not available)
- 1997 – The Life of a Housewife (Nad Sylvan)
- 2003 – Sylvanite (Nad Sylvan)
- 2015 – Courting the Widow (InsideOut)
- 2017 – The Bride Said No (InsideOut)
- 2019 – The Regal Bastard (InsideOut)
- 2021 – Spiritus Mundi (InsideOut)
- 2025 – Monumentata (InsideOut)

=== With Unifaun ===
- 2008 – Unifaun (Progress Records)

=== With Agents of Mercy ===
- 2009 – The Fading Ghosts of Twilight (Foxtrot Records)
- 2010 – Dramarama (Foxtrot Records)
- 2010 – The Power of Two – Karmacanic, Agents of Mercy Live (Reingold Records)
- 2011 – The Black Forest (Foxtrot Records)

=== With Steve Hackett ===
- 2012 – Genesis Revisited II (InsideOut)
- 2013 – Genesis Revisited – Live at Hammersmith (InsideOut)
- 2014 – Genesis Revisited - Live at the Royal Albert Hall (InsideOut)
- 2016 – Genesis Revisited - THE TOTAL EXPERIENCE - LIVE IN LIVERPOOL (InsideOut)
- 2017 – The Night Siren (Inside Out, Wolfwork)
- 2018 – Genesis Revisited - Wuthering Nights - Live in Birmingham (InsideOut)
- 2019 – Genesis Revisited: Band and Orchestra: LIVE AT THE ROYAL FESTIVAL HALL (InsideOut)
- 2020 – Genesis Revisited: Selling England By The Pound & Spectral Mornings: Live at Hammersmith (InsideOut)
- 2022 - Genesis Revisited: Seconds Out & More: Live in Manchester (InsideOut)
- 2023 - Foxtrot at Fifty + Hackett Highlights: Live in Brighton (InsideOut)
- 2024 - The Circus and the Nightwhale (InsideOut)
- 2025 - The Lamb Stands Up Live At The Royal Albert Hall (InsideOut)

=== Other projects ===
- 2013 – The Flower Kings – Desolation Road (InsideOut)
- 2016 – Harmony for Elephants (Esoteric Antenna, Cherry Red)
- 2016 – Anderson/Stolt – Invention of Knowledge (InsideOut)
- 2017 – RTFacts – Life is Good (AFL Music)
- 2017 – PBII: Rocket – The Dreams of Wubbo Ockels (Heartselling)
- 2018 – Roine Stolt's The Flower King – Manifesto of an Alchemist (InsideOut)
- 2018 – The Winter Tree – Topaz Islands Dreaming (Andrew Laitres)
