= Noise (Archive album) =

Studio album by Archive
- Released: March 23. 2004
- Genre: Trip hop, alternative rock
- Label: East West

Archive chronology
You All Look the Same to Me (2002)	Noise (2004)	Lights (2006)

Professional ratings
Review scores
Source	Rating
musicOMH	(mixed)

Noise is the fourth studio album of the London-based trip hop band Archive.

== Track listing ==
1. "Noise" – 6:42
2. "Fuck U" – 5:14
3. "Waste" – 9:57
4. "Sleep" – 6:51
5. "Here" – 1:02
6. "Get Out" – 4:30
7. "Conscience" – 4:17
8. "Pulse" – 4:50
9. "Wrong" – 0:56
10. "Love Song" – 6:20
11. "Me and You" – 8:00

"Get Out (radio mix)" - 3:59

=== Bonus DVD ===
1. Again (DVD)
2. Men Like You (DVD)
3. Gangsters (DVD)
4. Conscience (DVD)
5. St Malo (DVD)

== Personnel ==
- Vocals - Craig Walker
- Guitar, Harmonica, Percussion - Danny Griffiths
- Bass, Programming - Darius Keeler
- Guitar - Steve Harris (tracks: 2, 4, 10), Pete Barraclough (tracks: 3), James Tonkin (tracks: 4, 6)
- Drums - Steve "Smiley" Barnard, Matt Martin
- Bass - Lee Pomeroy (tracks: 1, 2, 4, 7), Carl Holt (tracks: 3, 10, 11)
- Hammond - Steve Watts (tracks: 1, 3, 4, 8)
- Strings - Graham Preskett (tracks: 2, 3, 4, 7, 8)

== Charts ==
Chart (2004)	Peak position
French Albums (SNEP)	19
Swiss Albums (Schweizer Hitparade)	82
Belgian Albums (Ultratop Wallonia)	33
