= Take My Head =

Studio album by Archive
- Released: 1999
- Genre: Trip hop, pop rock, downtempo
- Length: 45:12
- Label: Independiente

Archive chronology
Londinium (1996)	Take My Head (1999)	You All Look the Same to Me (2002)

Take My Head is the second studio album by the London-based band Archive. This album is a collaboration of Danny Griffiths and Darius Keeler together with singer Suzanne Wooder.

== Charts ==
Weekly chart performance for Take My Head
Chart (1999)	Peak position
French Albums (SNEP)	22

== Track listing ==
1. "You Make Me Feel" – 4:06
2. "The Way You Love Me" – 3:33
3. "Brother" – 3:44
4. "Well Known Sinner" – 4:23
5. "The Pain Gets Worse" – 4:34
6. "Woman" – 3:39
7. "Cloud in the Sky" – 4:41
8. "Take My Head" – 4:39
9. "Love in Summer" – 4:58
10. "Rest My Head on You" – 3:56

"Home" – 2:00 (hidden track)

The album contains a hidden track, which begins one minute after the end of "Rest My Head on You".

== Commentaries ==
- There is also a limited edition of this album, which contains 2 remixes of the first track, "You Make Me Feel".
- This album is the only one that features Suzanne Wooder as singer of the band.
- "You Make Me Feel" was chosen for the Garnier Olia advert in 2012.
