= Restriction (Archive album) =

Studio album by Archive
- Released: 12 January 2015
- Genre: Rock
- Length: 56:01
- Label: PIAS

Archive chronology
Axiom (2014)	Restriction (2015)	The False Foundation (2016)

Professional ratings
Aggregate scores
Source	Rating
Metacritic	68/100
Review scores
Source	Rating
The Telegraph	3/5 stars

Restriction is the tenth studio album by British band Archive. It was released in January 2015 under PIAS Records.

== Track listing ==
No.	Title	Length
1.	"Feel It"	3:17
2.	"Restriction"	4:00
3.	"Kid Corner"	3:39
4.	"End of Our Days"	4:52
5.	"Third Quarter Storm"	5:26
6.	"Half Built Houses"	3:31
7.	"Ride in Squares"	6:34
8.	"Ruination"	3:52
9.	"Crushed"	5:55
10.	"Black and Blue"	3:44
11.	"Greater Goodbye"	6:08
12.	"Ladders"	5:03

== Charts ==
=== Weekly charts ===
Chart (2015)	Peak position
Belgian Albums (Ultratop Flanders)	91
Belgian Albums (Ultratop Wallonia)	19
Dutch Albums (Album Top 100)	66
French Albums (SNEP)	10
Polish Albums (ZPAV)	2
German Albums (Offizielle Top 100)	37
Swiss Albums (Schweizer Hitparade)	3

=== Year-end charts ===
Chart (2015)	Position
Belgian Albums (Ultratop Wallonia)	147
