= Leila (music producer) =

Iranian-born record producer and DJ (born 1971)

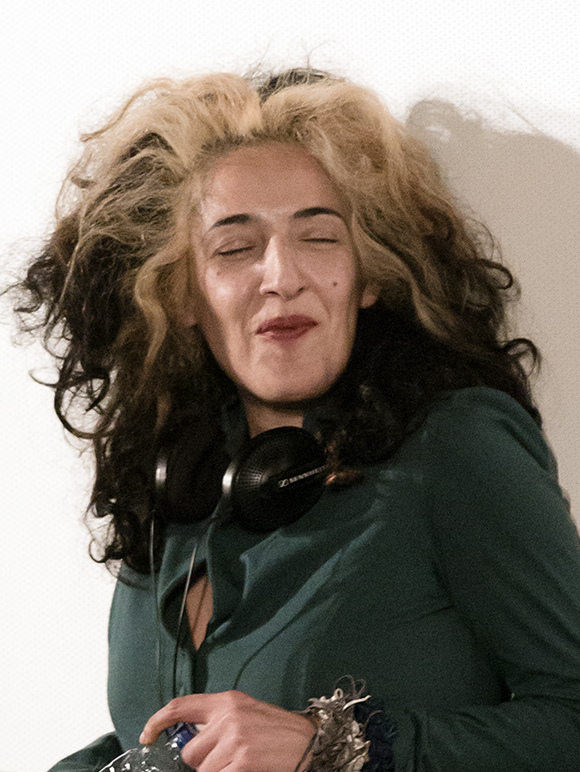

Background information
- Also known as: Grammatix, Little Miss Specta
- Born: Leila Arab; 3 September 1971 (age 55); Tehran, Pahlavi Iran
- Origin: London, England
- Genre: Electronic
- Occupations: Producer, DJ
- Years active: 1993-present
- Labels: Rephlex Records, Warp, XL Recordings
- Website: warp.net/artists/91393-leila

Leila Arab (Persian: لیلا عرب, born in 1971), professionally known as Leila, is an Iranian-born record producer and DJ based in London, England. She has released music on the labels Rephlex, XL and Warp. She has also worked extensively with Icelandic singer Björk.

== Biography ==
Arab was born in Pahlavi Iran. She spent part of her childhood there.

Her family fled to London following the Iranian Revolution in 1979. She became interested in DJing and keyboards, and left college to perform with Icelandic singer Björk in 1994, later working with her as a sound engineer and live mixer. She met Richard D. James while both were on tour with Björk, and both James and Grant Wilson-Claridge suggested she release her solo recordings on their label Rephlex Records.

In 1998, Leila released her debut album, Like Weather, on Rephlex. In 2000, she released Courtesy of Choice on XL Recordings. Ben Thompson of The Telegraph referred to these releases as "two collections of spooky electronic soul which ... established her as an integral member of the Nineties' golden generation of British writer-producers."

After a hiatus following the death of her parents, she released Blood Looms and Blooms in 2008 on Warp. It included vocal contributions from Terry Hall and Martina Topley-Bird. In 2009, she contributed a cover of an Aphex Twin song, "Vordhosbn", to the Warp20 (Recreated) compilation album.

In 2012, she released her fourth LP U&I on Warp. In 2015, she released a collaborative EP with Zebra Katz, titled Nu Renegade, on ZFK Records.

== Discography ==
=== Albums ===
- Like Weather (1998)
- Courtesy of Choice (2000)
- Blood Looms and Blooms (2008)
- U&I (2012)

=== EPs ===
- Nu Renegade (2015) (with Zebra Katz)

=== Singles ===
- "Don't Fall Asleep" (1997)
- “Space, Love" (1998)
- "Feeling" (1998)
- "Sodastream" (1999)
- "Mettle" (2008)
- "Deflect" (2008)
- "(Disappointed Cloud) Anyway" (2011)
