= Lights (Archive album) =

Studio album by Archive
- Released: 2006
- Genre: Trip hop, alternative rock, electronic, progressive rock
- Length: 62:01
- Label: East West

Archive chronology
Noise (2004)	Lights (2006)	Controlling Crowds (Parts I-III) (2009)

Lights is the fifth studio album by British trip hop progressive and alternative group Archive, released in 2006.

== Track listing ==
1. "Sane" – 4:26
2. "Sit Back Down" – 6:36
3. "Veins" – 4:01
4. "System" – 4:01
5. "Fold" – 4:37
6. "Lights" – 18:28
7. "I Will Fade" – 3:08
8. "Headlights" – 3:32
9. "Programmed" – 5:45
10. "Black" – 2:52
11. "Taste of Blood" – 4:35

== Charts ==
Chart (2006)	Peak position
Belgian Albums (Ultratop Wallonia)	11
French Albums (SNEP)	15
Swiss Albums (Schweizer Hitparade)	20
