= You All Look the Same to Me =

Studio album by Archive
- Released: 12 March 2002
- Genre: Trip hop, progressive rock, psychedelic rock, alternative rock, electronic
- Length: 67:05
- Label: Hangman Records

Archive chronology
Take My Head (1999)	You All Look the Same to Me (2002)	Noise (2004)

You All Look the Same to Me is the third studio album by English musical group Archive. In the album Archive used Craig Walker for vocals and gradually turned away from their roots in electronica and trip hop and towards more psychedelic and progressive style of bands such as Pink Floyd and Mogwai. This album is Archive's first album with their new vocalist Craig Walker, formerly of Power of Dreams, a pop/rock band built around him and Keith Walker.

== Track listing ==
1. "Again" – 16:21
2. "Numb" – 5:48
3. "Meon" – 5:45
4. "Goodbye" – 5:40
5. "Now and Then" – 1:24
6. "Seamless" – 1:45
7. "Finding It So Hard" – 15:35
8. "Fool" – 8:31
9. "Hate" – 3:45
10. "Need" – 2:26

Limited Edition bonus tracks:

1. "Absurd" – 5:00
2. "Junkie Shuffle" – 10:40
3. "Sham" – 5:05
4. "Men Like You" – 3:56

== Charts ==
=== Weekly charts ===
2002 chart performance for You All Look the Same to Me
Chart (2002)	Peak position
Belgian Albums (Ultratop Wallonia)	12
French Albums (SNEP)	21

2024 chart performance for You All Look the Same to Me
Chart (2024)	Peak position
German Albums (Offizielle Top 100)	57

=== Year-end charts ===
Chart (2002)	Position
Belgian Albums (Ultratop Wallonia)	92
French Albums (SNEP)	144

== Certifications ==
Region	Certification	Certified units/sales
France (SNEP)	Gold	100,000^{*}
^{*} Sales figures based on certification alone.
