= Steve Hackett discography =

This article is a discography of albums and singles released by the guitarist-songwriter Steve Hackett.

== Solo career ==
Camino Records was founded by Hackett with the original goal of re-releasing selections from his solo career, but Hackett eventually also released new albums on the label.

=== Studio albums ===
Title	Album details	Peak chart positions							
Title	Album details	UK	SWE	NOR	US	NLD	GER	FRA	SWI
Voyage of the Acolyte	Released: October 1975; UK label: Charisma; US label: Chrysalis; Formats: LP, CS, CD, digital download	26	—	—	191	—	—	—	—
Please Don't Touch!	Released: April 1978; UK label: Charisma; US label: Chrysalis; Formats: LP, CS, CD, digital download	38	23	—	103	—	49	—	—
Spectral Mornings	Released: May 1979; UK label: Charisma; US label: Chrysalis; Formats: LP, CS, CD, digital download	22	30	—	138	—	—	—	—
Defector	Released: June 1980; Label: Charisma; Formats: LP, CS, CD, digital download	9	30	22	144	—	—	—	—
Cured	Released: August 1981; UK label: Charisma; US label: Epic; Formats: LP, CS, CD, digital download	15	29	21	169	—	—	—	—
Highly Strung	Released: April 1983; UK label: Charisma; US label: Epic; Formats: LP, CS, CD, digital download	16	—	—	—	—	—	—	—
Bay of Kings	Released: October 1983; Label: Lamborghini; Formats: LP, CS, CD, digital download	70	—	—	—	—	—	—	—
Till We Have Faces	Released: August 1984; Label: Lamborghini; Formats: LP, CS, CD, digital download	54	—	—	—	—	—	—	—
Momentum	Released: March 1988; Label: Start; Formats: LP, CS, CD, digital download	—	—	—	—	—	—	—	—
Guitar Noir	Released: May 1993; Label: Camino; Formats: CS, CD, digital download	—	—	—	—	—	—	—	—
Blues with a Feeling	Released: 10 October 1994; Label: Camino; Formats: CS, CD	—	—	—	—	—	—	—	—
Genesis Revisited	Released: 23 September 1996; UK label: Camino; US label: Snapper; Formats: LP, CS, CD	95	—	—	—	—	—	—	—
A Midsummer Night's Dream (with Royal Philharmonic Orchestra)	Released: 1 April 1997; Label: Angel; Formats: CS, CD	—	—	—	—	—	—	—	—
Darktown	Released: 26 April 1999; Label: Inside Out Music; Formats: CD, digital download	156	—	—	—	—	—	—	—
Sketches of Satie (with John Hackett)	Released: 8 May 2000; Label: Inside Out Music; Formats: LP, CD, digital download	—	—	—	—	—	—	—	—
Feedback 86	Released: 9 October 2000; Label: Camino; Formats: CD, digital download	—	—	—	—	—	—	—	—
To Watch the Storms	Released: 17 June 2003; Label: Camino; Formats: CD, digital download	—	—	—	—	—	—	—	—
Metamorpheus (with The Underworld Orchestra)	Released: 5 April 2005; Label: Camino; Formats: CD	—	—	—	—	—	—	—	—
Wild Orchids	Released: 12 September 2006; Label: Camino; Formats: CD, digital download	—	—	—	—	—	—	—	—
Tribute	Released: 11 February 2008; Label: Camino; Formats: CD	—	—	—	—	—	—	—	—
Out of the Tunnel's Mouth	Released: 30 October 2009; Label: Wolfwork/EAR Music; Formats: LP, CD, digital download	173	—	—	—	—	—	—	—
Beyond the Shrouded Horizon	Released: 27 September 2011; Label: Inside Out Music; Formats: LP, CD, digital download	133	—	—	—	—	63	178	—
A Life Within a Day (with Chris Squire as Squackett)	Released: 28 May 2012; Label: Esoteric Antenna; Formats: CD, digital download	173	—	—	—	—	—	—	—
Genesis Revisited II	Released: 22 October 2012; Label: Inside Out Music; Formats: LP, CD, digital download	24	—	—	—	52	32	119	80
Wolflight	Released: 27 March 2015; Label: Inside Out Music; Formats: LP, CD, digital download	31	—	—	—	49	49	128	58
The Night Siren	Released: 24 March 2017; Label: Inside Out Music; Formats: LP, CD, digital download	28	—	—	—	43	22	101	39
At the Edge of Light	Released: 25 January 2019; Label: Inside Out Music; Formats: LP, CD, digital download	28	—	—	—	72	13	151	21
Under a Mediterranean Sky	Released: 21 January 2021; Label: Inside Out Music; Formats: LP, CD, digital	52	—	—	—	—	—	—	—
Surrender of Silence	Released: 10 September 2021; Label: Inside Out Music; Formats: LP, CD, digital download	38	—	—	—	—	10	—	25
The Circus and the Nightwhale	Released: 16 February 2024; Label: Inside Out Music	30	—	—	—	73	11	—	15
The Roaring Waves (with Steve Rothery)	Released: 28 August 2026; Label: Inside Out Music	24	—	—	—	15	6	—	9
"—" denotes a recording that did not chart or was not released in that territory.

=== Live albums ===
Title	Album details	Peak chart positions					
Title	Album details	UK	GER	SWI	NLD	BEL (FL)	BEL (WA)
Time Lapse	Released: July 1992; Label: Camino; Formats: CD	—	—	—	—	—	—
There Are Many Sides to the Night	Released: August 1995; Label: Camino; Formats: CD	—	—	—	—	—	—
The Tokyo Tapes	Released: 27 April 1998; Label: Camino; Formats: 2CD, digital download	—	—	—	—	—	—
Live Archive 70s, 80s, 90s	Released: 12 November 2001; Label: Camino; Formats: 4CD	—	—	—	—	—	—
Live Archive 70s Newcastle	Released: 12 November 2001; Label: Camino; Formats: CD	—	—	—	—	—	—
Somewhere in South America...	Released: 19 November 2002; Label: Camino; Formats: 2CD	—	—	—	—	—	—
Live Archive NEARfest	Released: 28 June 2003; Label: Camino; Formats: 2CD	—	—	—	—	—	—
Hungarian Horizons	Released: 23 July 2003; Label: Camino; Formats: 2CD	—	—	—	—	—	—
Live Archive 03	Released: February 2004; Label: Camino; Formats: 2CD	—	—	—	—	—	—
Live Archive 04	Released: 28 June 2004; Label: Camino; Formats: 2CD	—	—	—	—	—	—
Live Archive 05	Released: 23 August 2005; Label: Camino; Formats: 2CD	—	—	—	—	—	—
Live Archive 83	Released: 17 June 2006; Label: Camino; Formats: CD	—	—	—	—	—	—
Live Rails	Released: 25 April 2011; UK label: Wolfwork; US label: Inside Out Music; Formats: 2CD, digital download	—	—	—	—	—	—
Genesis Revisited: Live at Hammersmith	Released: 18 November 2013; Label: Inside Out Music; Formats: 3CD+DVD, digital download	58	17	97	53	195	78
Genesis Revisited: Live at the Royal Albert Hall	Released: 8 July 2014; Label: Inside Out Music; Formats: 2CD+DVD, digital download	80	23	—	—	—	109
The Total Experience Live In Liverpool	Released: 24 June 2016; Recorded: Friday 23 October 2015 At Liverpool Philharmonic Hall; Label: Inside Out Music; Formats: 2CD+DVD, digital download	77	25	90	—	86	—
Wuthering Nights: Live in Birmingham	Released: 26 January 2018; Recorded: May 2017; Label: Inside Out Music; Formats: 2CD+DVD, digital download	54	25	—	88	—	103
Genesis Revisited Band & Orchestra: Live at the Royal Festival Hall	Released: 25 October 2019; Recorded: October 2018; Label: Inside Out Music; Formats: 2CD+DVD, digital download	—	32	85	—	—	—
Selling England By The Pound & Spectral Mornings: Live At Hammersmith	Released: 25 September 2020; Recorded: 2019; Label: Inside Out Music; Formats: 2CD+DVD, digital download	—	—	—	—	—	—
Genesis Revisited Live: Seconds Out & More	Released: 2 September 2022; Recorded: 24 September 2021; Label: Inside Out Music; Formats: 2CD+DVD, digital download, streaming	28	13	—	24	73	68
Foxtrot at Fifty + Hackett Highlights: Live in Brighton	Released: 15 September 2023; Recorded: 2022; Label: Inside Out Music; Formats: 2CD+DVD, digital download, streaming	51	24	28	46	134	96
The Lamb Stands Up Live at the Royal Albert Hall	Released: 11 July 2025; Recorded: 12 October 2024; Label: Inside Out Music; Formats: 2CD+Blu-Ray, digital download, streaming	68	11	26	24	79	84
"—" denotes a recording that did not chart or was not released in that territory.

=== Compilation albums ===
Title	Album details
The Unauthorised Biography	Released: 26 October 1992; Label: Virgin; Formats: CD

=== Box sets ===
Title	Box set details
Premonitions	Released: 16 October 2015; Label: Universal Music Group; Formats: 10CD+4DVD
Broken Skies - Outspread Wings	Released: 5 October 2018; Label: Inside Out Music; Formats: 6CD+2DVD

=== Videos ===
Title	Video details	Peak chart positions
Title	Video details	SWE
The Tokyo Tapes	Released: 1 October 2001; Label: Camino; Formats: DVD	—
Somewhere in South America...	Released: 19 November 2002; Label: Camino; Formats: DVD	—
Somewhere in South America...	Released: 19 November 2002; Label: Camino; Formats: DVD+2CD	17
Horizons	Released: 1 July 2003; Label: Classic Rock Productions; Formats: DVD	—
Hungarian Horizons	Released: 23 July 2003; Label: Camino; Formats: DVD	—
Hungarian Horizons	Released: 23 July 2003; Label: Camino; Formats: DVD+2CD	—
Once Above a Time	Released: 25 November 2004; Label: Eagle Vision; Formats: DVD	—
Fire & Ice	Released: 25 September 2012; Label: Wolfwork; Formats: DVD	—
The Bremen Broadcast	Released as: 28 October 2013; Label: Cherry Red; Formats: DVD	—
The Man, The Music	Released: 7 September 2015; Label: Wienerworld; Formats: DVD	—
"—" denotes a recording that did not chart or was not released in that territory.

=== Singles ===
- "Ace of Wands" / "The Hermit" (1975) 1
- "Star of Sirius" (Edited - Mono) / "Star of Sirius" (Edited - Stereo) (1976)
- "How Can I?" / "Kim" (1978)
- "Narnia" (remix) / "Please Don't Touch" (1978) – withdrawn release?
- "Every Day" / "Lost Time in Cordoba" (1979)
- "Clocks - The Angel of Mons" (alternate version) / "Acoustic Set" (live) (1979)
- "Clocks" (alternate version) / "Acoustic Set" (live) / "Tigermoth" (live) 12" single (1979)
- "The Show" / "Hercules Unchained" (1980)
- "Sentimental Institution" / "The Toast" (1980)
- "Hope I Don't Wake" / "Tales from the Riverbank" (1981)
- "Picture Postcard" / "Theme from 'Second Chance'" (1982)
- "Cell 151" (single edit) / "The Air-Conditioned Nightmare" (1983) – UK #66
- "Cell 151" (long version) / "The Air-Conditioned Nightmare" (live) / "Time Lapse at Milton Keynes" 12" single (1983)
- "Cell 151" (track listing as above) limited edition 12" doublepack with shrinkwrapped 12" white label of "Clocks" 12" (track list as above) (1983)
- "Walking Through Walls" (single remix)" (1983) – withdrawn but 7" & 12" one-sided Utopia acetates were pressed
- "A Doll That's Made In Japan (part 1)"/ "A Doll That's Made In Japan (part 2)" (1984)
- "A Doll That's Made in Japan" (long version) / "Just the Bones" 12" single (1984)
- "Days of Long Ago" promo (1991)
- "Brand New" (radio edit) / "Brand New" (album version) (2003)
- "Sea of Smiles" / "Perfect Love Song" (2012 with Chris Squire as Squackett)
- "Til These Eyes" / "Enter The Night" (radio mix) (2012) – download only
- "Behind the Smoke" (2017)
- "People of the Smoke" (2023)
- "Wherever You Are" (2024)

=== Soundtracks ===
- Outwitting Hitler (2001, score to the Showtime documentary)

Note: This was not an album, but consisted only of three instrumental tracks, each about a minute in length. They were only made available via a free MP3 download page on Steve's website. The musical themes were subsequently featured in tracks from Metamorpheus.

=== Appeared on ===
- Sacred Scenes And Characters by Canterbury Glass (1968) (1 track: Prologue) - The album was recorded in 1968 but published only in 2007.
- Two Sides of Peter Banks by Peter Banks (1973) (1 track : Knights (Reprise), also featuring Phil Collins)
- Voo de Coracao by Ritchie (1984) (1 track : Voo de Coração)
- Wind in the Willows by Eddie Hardin (1985) (1 track : Wind in the Willows)
- Strangeland by Box of Frogs (1986) (2 tracks : Average and Trouble)
- Orchestral Maneuvres: The Music of Pink Floyd by David Palmer and the Royal Philharmonic Orchestra (1991)
- Gallery of Dreams by Gandalf (1992) (7 tracks: Face the Mirror, Alone Again, Between Different Worlds, Another Dream, Song of the Unicorn, Lady of the Golden Forrest and End of the Rainbow, the last of which Hackett co-wrote)
- Arkangel by John Wetton (1997) (2 tracks : Nothing Happens for Nothing and All Grown up)
- Drivers Eyes by Ian McDonald (1999) (2 tracks : You Are a Part of Me and Straight Back to You)
- Sinister by John Wetton (2001) (1 track : Real World)
- Sheafs Are Dancing by Djabe (2003) (1 track : Reflections of Thiérache)
- Emergent by Gordian Knot (2003) (3 tracks : Muttersprache, Some Brighter Thing and Singing Deep Mountain)
- Hexameron by Nick Magnus (2004) (3 tracks : Singularity, Seven Hands of Time and The Power of Reason)
- Checking Out of London by John Hackett (2005) (4 tracks : Late Trains, The Hallway and the Pram, Ego & Id and Headlights)
- ? by Neal Morse (2005)
- Swiss Choir by Chris Squire (2007)
- U-Catastrophe by Simon Collins (2008) (1 track : Fast Forward the Future)
- Sitting on the Top of Time by Jim McCarty (2009) (1 track : Living from the Inside Out)
- JL by Algebra, (2009) (1 track : Il molo deserto)
- The Book of Bilbo and Gandalf by Marco Lo Muscio (2010) (1 track: Galadriel)
- Children of Another God by Nick Magnus (2010) (1 track : The Colony Is King)
- Dirty and Beautiful Volume 1 by Gary Husband (2010) (1 track: Moon Song)
- Cavalli Cocchi, Lanzetti & Roversi by CCLR (2011) (1 track: Great Love Does Burn Fast)
- Raised in Captivity by John Wetton (2011) (1 track: Goodbye Elsinore)
- Grace for Drowning by Steven Wilson (2011) (1 track: Remainder the Black Dog)
- Prog Exhibition 2 by Various Artists (2012) (3 tracks: Profondo Rosso, Improvvisazione and Watcher of the Skies)
- Talsete di Marsantino by L'Estate di San Martino (2012) (2 tracks: Ely and Otto)
- The Rome Pro(g)ject by The Rome Pro(G)ject (2012) (2 tracks: Down to the Domus Aurea and The Mouth of Truth both co-written by Hackett)
- Beneath the Waves by Kompendium (2012) (1 track Lilly)
- A Proggy Christmas by The Prog World Orchestra (2012) (1 track: Joy to the World)
- Captain Blue by Rob Cottingham (2012) (1 track: Soaring to the Sun)
- Lifesigns by Lifesigns (2013)
- Playing the History by John Hackett, Marco Lo Muscio & Carlo Matteucci (2013) (4 tracks: Hairless Heart, After the Ordeal, Hands of the Priestess, Galadriel)
- The Theory of Everything by Ayreon (2013) (1 track : The Parting)
- Overnight Snow by Nick Fletcher & John Hackett (2013) (1 track : Three Mediterranean Sketches)
- C:Ore by Duncan Parsons (2014) (1 track : J: Oi!, playing harmonica, joined by John Hackett, Gary Boyle, and Ton Scherpenzeel)
- N'Monix by Nick Magnus (2014) (3 tracks : Eminent Victorians, Broken and Shadowland)
- The Ghosts of Pripyat by Steve Rothery (2014) (2 tracks : Morpheus and Old Man of the Sea)
- Torn Apart by Franck Carducci (2015) (1 track : Closer to Irreversible)
- Courting The Widow by Nad Sylvan (2015)
- Another Life by John Hackett (2015)
- Cabdury-Hicks by Cadbury-Hicks (2015) (1 track : Just Another Honky-Tonk)
- Citizen by Billy Sherwood (2015) (1 track : Man and the Machine)
- Of Fate And Glory by The Rome Pro(G)ject II (2016) (3 tracks : Of Fate And Glory, S.P.Q.R. and The Pantheon's Dome, all co-written by Hackett)
- EXEGI MONVMENTVM AERE PERENNIVS by The Rome Pro(G)ject (2017) (2 tracks - Down to the Domus Aurea - co-written by Hackett - and EXEGI MONVMENTVM)
- Unsung Prophets & Dead Messiahs (2018) by Orphaned Land (1 track: Chains Fall to Gravity)
- The Secrets by Alan Parsons (2019) (1 track: The Sorcerer's Apprentice)
- Deconstructing Classics by Algebra (2019) (1 track: La cura)
- A Life in Yes - The Chris Squire Tribute (2019) (1 track: The More We Live - Let Go)
- On the Wings of the Wind by John Hackett and Marco Lo Muscio (2019)
- Andrea Padova plays Lo Muscio by Andrea Padova and Marco Lo Muscio (2019)
- All That I Am & All That I Was by Ms Amy Birks (2020) (1 track: I Wish)
- Isolation by The Backstage (2020) (1 track: Covid Nights)
- The Sound Of Dreams by Dave Minasian (2020)
- Worlds On Hold by Prog Collective (2021) (1 track: Glory Days Ahead)
- Dark Horizons by Illuminae (2021) (1 track: The Lighthouse)
- Windhover by Lee Gobbi (2021) (1 track: Windhover)
- Spiritus Mundi by Nad Sylvan (2021) (1 track: To A Child Dancing In The Wind)
- Still Wish You Were Here by Various Artists (2021) (1 track: Shine On You Crazy Diamond)
- Innocence And Illusion by Amanda Lehmann (2021) (3 tracks: Only Happy When It Rains, Forever Days and Shere The Small Things Go)
- I Dreamed of Electric Sheep - Ho sognato pecore elettriche by PFM (2021) (1 track: Kindred Souls)
- Sun's Signature by Sun's Signature (2022)
- The Myth Of Mostrophus by Ryo Okumoto (2022) (1 track: Maximum Velocity)
- Planetary Overload Part 3 - Hope by UPF - United Progressive Fraternity (2023) (1 track: Being of Equaal)
- The Liberty Project by Edward Reekers (2023) (1 track: The Clash of Belief)
- Project One by David Jackson & Marco Lo Muscio (2023) (1 track: Hammer In The Sand)
- Bar Stool Prophet by Christina (2023) (1 track: Rise Again)
- Transmutation by Karmakanic (2025) (1 track: Transmutation)
- In fatti ostili by Delta V (2025) (1 track: I Raggi B)

== With Genesis ==
=== Studio albums ===
- Nursery Cryme (November 1971, #39 UK)
- Foxtrot (October 1972, #12 UK)
- Selling England by the Pound (October 1973, #3 UK, #70 US)
- The Lamb Lies Down on Broadway (November 1974, #10 UK, #41 US)
- A Trick of the Tail (February 1976, #3 UK, #31 US)
- Wind & Wuthering (December 1976, #7 UK, #26 US)

=== Live albums ===
- Genesis Live (June 1973, #9 UK)
- Seconds Out (October 1977, #4 UK, #47 US)
- Three Sides Live (June 1982, #2 UK, #10 US, appears on "It/Watcher of the Skies")

=== Compilation albums ===
- Turn It On Again: The Hits (October 1999, #4 UK, #65 US, appears on "I Know What I Like (In Your Wardrobe)" and "The Carpet Crawlers 1999")
- Platinum Collection (November 2004, #21 UK, appears on "...In That Quiet Earth", "Afterglow", "Your Own Special Way", "A Trick of the Tail", "Ripples", "Los Endos", "The Lamb Lies Down on Broadway", "Counting Out Time", "The Carpet Crawlers", "Firth of Fifth", "The Cinema Show", "I Know What I Like (In Your Wardrobe)", "Supper's Ready" and "The Musical Box")

=== Box sets ===
- Genesis Archive 1967–75 (June 1998, #35 UK, appears on all tracks on the first three discs)
- Genesis Archive #2 1976–92 (November 2000, appears on "Entangled (Live)," "It's Yourself," "Pigeons," and "Inside and Out")
- Genesis 1976–1982 (April 2007, includes A Trick of the Tail, Wind & Wuthering and exclusive Extra Tracks 1976–1982, the latter with Hackett on "Pigeons", "Inside and Out", "It's Yourself" and "Match of the Day")
- Genesis 1970–1975 (November 2008, includes Nursery Cryme, Foxtrot, Selling England by the Pound, The Lamb Lies Down on Broadway and exclusive Extra Tracks 1970–1975, the latter with Hackett on "Happy The Man" and "Twilight Alehouse")
- Genesis Live 1973–2007 (September 2009, includes Genesis Live, Seconds Out, Three Sides Live and exclusive Live at the Rainbow)

=== Videos ===
- The Genesis Songbook (July 2001)
- The Video Show (November 2004, appears on "A Trick of the Tail", "Ripples", "Robbery, Assault and Battery" and "The Carpet Crawlers 1999")

=== EPs ===
- Spot the Pigeon (May 1977, #14 UK)

=== Singles ===
- "Happy the Man" / "Seven Stones" (October 1972)
- "I Know What I Like (In Your Wardrobe)" / "Twilight Alehouse" (February 1974, #21 UK)
- "Counting Out Time" / "Riding the Scree" (November 1974)
- "The Carpet Crawlers" / "Evil Jam (The Waiting Room Live)" (April 1975)
- "A Trick of the Tail" / "Ripples" (March 1976)
- "Your Own Special Way" / "It's Yourself" (February 1977, #43 UK, #62 US)

== With GTR ==
=== Studio albums ===
- GTR (May 1986, #41 UK, #11 US)

=== Singles ===
- "When the Heart Rules the Mind" (1986, #82 UK, #14 US)
- "The Hunter" (1986, #85 US)

== With Djabe ==
=== Studio albums ===
- Down and Up (2012)
- Back to Sardinia (2019)
- The Magic Stag (2020)

=== Live albums ===
- Sipi Emlékoncert (2009)
- In the Footsteps of Attila and Genghis (2011)
- Summer Storms and Rocking Rivers (2013)
- Live in Blue (2014)
- Life Is a Journey - The Sardinia Tapes (2017)
- Life Is a Journey - The Budapest Live Tapes (2018)
- It Is Never the Same Twice (2018)
- The Journey Continues (2021)
- Live at Porgy & Bess (2022)
- Live in Győr (2023)
- When the Sound Turns Sweet (2024)

=== EPs ===
- Erre táncolnak a kazlak remix EP (2003)
- Carpet Crawlers live EP (2023)

=== Videos ===
- Sipi Emlékoncert (2009)
- 15th Anniversary Concert (2011)
- Down and Up - Live in Budapest (2013)
- Live in Blue (2015)
- Summer Storms and Rocking Rivers (2016)
- It Is Never the Same Twice (2018)
- Life Is a Journey - The Budapest Live Tapes (2018)
- The Journey Continues (2021)
- Live in Győr (2023)

== With Sonic Obsession ==
=== Singles ===
- "Timeless" (1994)

== With Quiet World ==
=== Studio albums ===
- The Road (1970)
