= Julian Colbeck =

British musician (born 1952)

- Born: 1952 (age 73–74)
- Genres: Progressive rock; pop rock; classical; folk
- Occupations: Musician; songwriter; producer; entrepreneur; author; journalist
- Instruments: Keyboards; backing vocals
- Years active: 1973–present

Julian Colbeck (born 1952) is an English musician, writer, and music tech entrepreneur. He is CEO of the multi-media music company Keyfax NewMedia and partner with Alan Parsons in "Alan Parsons' The Art & Science of Sound Recording". Formerly a professional keyboard player for over 25 years, Colbeck is also the author of numerous music-related books, the creator of Twiddly.Bits MIDI loops, the concept designer for the PhatBoy MIDI controller, and producer of many music technology videos and websites.

As a keyboardist, Colbeck played with Greep, The New Seekers, Charlie, John Miles, Yes offshoot Anderson Bruford Wakeman Howe, and ex-Genesis guitarist Steve Hackett, amongst others. He also worked as a session player on numerous recordings, including with Charlie, Yes co-founder Jon Anderson, Steve Hackett, and Vitamin Z, whose debut album was produced by Alan Parsons.

Colbeck continues to work creatively as a producer, songwriter, and consultant. He co-wrote "Give 'Em My Love", a song included on Alan Parsons's studio release From the New World (2022). Colbeck was principal arranger, keyboardist and co-producer along with Armand Ruby on the pre-release soundtrack for "Equinox the Musical", and served in similar roles for other releases from Karmic Neighborhood, including "I Don’t Want to Walk Away". In 2024 Colbeck produced “Lucky" by John Redlove , and in 2025 he produced a modern classical album “Crusades” by composer Rudolph Shober. “Crusades" is an immersive listening experience blending historical dramatization, poetic narration, and evocative music, centered on the spiritual and political odyssey of Richard I of England.

Colbeck's work with Keyfax involves analysis of the music technology industry and MIDI recording, past, present, and future, while striving to champion musicians and musicality in the face of music tech.

== Early life and education ==
Born in 1952 in Aldershot in Hampshire, England, Colbeck began boarding school in Malvern, later attending Monkton Combe School in Bath, where he played in the band 'Springtime Child'. He began playing piano at age 8 when his parents purchased a 1910 Broadwood upright piano, on which he composed more or less everything he has ever written. He still owns it to this day. Colbeck later attended Inchbald School of Design, 1970–1971.

== Music and Bands ==
In 1973 after a brief stint in college, and a spell in the left-wing rock choir Co-operation, Colbeck signed a record deal with Charisma Records with the band 'Greep'. After releasing a number of singles, the group disbanded and Colbeck found himself working in fringe theater, London's Albany Theatre, Deptford.

The New Seekers needed a keyboard player and Colbeck landed the gig, playing many live concerts and TV shows in UK and Europe, including the group's famed Drury Lane concert in 1974. During this time he met their lighting director, who coincidentally was also the manager for a band called Charlie. Hired initially as a session player for the recording of the group's No Second Chance album at Trident Studios, London, he was subsequently asked to join the band as a full-time member.

=== Charlie ===
Colbeck was called upon to replace the Charlie keyboard player Martin Smith and began almost five years of constant touring and music making. He co-produced three Charlie albums: Lines, Fight Dirty, and Here Comes Trouble.

He left the band in 1980 amid turmoil. He wrote, "Finally, the touring band line-up of Terry Thomas, John Anderson, Eugene Organ, Steve Gadd, and myself ceased operations once Arista refused to release Here Comes Trouble, and our caring, sharing management company immediately cut off all our money in 1980. That's a whole other story but, for the record, our final gig was in 1979 at the Civic Center in Providence, RI on Monday 29 October, alongside Foreigner."

After Charlie, Colbeck moved to Los Angeles, worked a bit with Robby Krieger, almost broke into film music ("the industry was just not quite ready for synthesizers at the time"), and was the musical director for Captain Crash vs The Zzorg Women, Chapters 5 &6, written by Steve Hammond, Dave Pierce, and Rick Jones. Nearly starving, Colbeck was saved when he was picked up by a band named Tropical Madness. Moving back to UK in 1982, Colbeck undertook several tours of the UK and Europe with British pop star John Miles.

=== Anderson Bruford Wakeman Howe ===
In 1989, Colbeck joined Yes alumni group Anderson Bruford Wakeman Howe as second keyboard player and live musical director, and played every date during 1989-1990 tours. He also appeared on two albums, Symphonic Music of Yes and Live at Mountain View, the latter also released as the DVD An Evening of Yes Music Plus.

He also appeared on Watching the Flags, a Jon Anderson solo record on which he played and co-wrote extensively. He also recorded with Steve Howe and Bill Bruford on a number of solo projects.

=== Steve Hackett ===
Earlier in 1989, Colbeck began what would become a long-term association with Steve Hackett, appearing on a live-recorded TV show that would become the album and DVD Time Lapse. Over the next seven years he appeared on 10 or more Steve Hackett albums and countless North and South American tours.

In 1996, whilst on stage with Steve Hackett and Chester Thompson along with John Wetton and Ian McDonald, Colbeck had a cathartic moment. "I looked around stage and saw a bunch of old men, including (if not especially) me". He made a conscious decision and determined to "get the hell out" of performing onstage and has yet to return. He continues to hold a firm belief that live rock 'n' roll music is a young man's game.

=== Back to Bach ===
In 1991, Colbeck released a solo album Back to Bach, [EG/Virgin] collaborating with concert pianist Jonathan Cohen, plus Steve Hackett, Milton McDonald, John Keeble, Mary Hopkin, and the Irish poet Brian Keenan.

== Writing ==
In the late 1970s, Colbeck started writing for numerous English Language MI and Pro Audio magazines (as well as some French, German and Japanese) including: Sounds, Sound on Sound, Music Technology, Keyboard Player, Keyboard, Music Week, Making Music, Electronic Musician, and The Frankfurt Daily. He subsequently published several keyboard buyers guides, a Frank Zappa biography, music related and even assisted his then brother-in-law Raymond Blanc, with a cookbook. In 2025, Colbeck started writing his touring memoirs, “Travels With My Amp”, based on diaries written after every single live show he played throughout his performing career - since he was 11. Publication is due in 2027.

== Keyfax ==
Keyfax Software was founded in 1993, taking its name from Colbeck's keyboard and synthesizer guides. Initially created to market the original concept of ‘MIDI Samples' under the name Twiddly.Bits, the company developed into a multifaceted business offering music technology distribution and support (via DVDs/Websites), MIDI samples, and Steinberg music software, and became the exclusive distributor for the Yamaha Tenori-On.

"My role as CEO is divided between providing our creative direction and ensuring that this direction is both invigorating for those who work here and economically sustainable for the company". "It beats rock 'n' roll only in that I get to spend way less time at Denny's". – Julian Colbeck

=== Twiddly.Bits ===
When Colbeck was asked to review some particularly dismal standard MIDI song files, he realized that there were no MIDI samples available on the market that actually sounded good. He then enlisted help from programmer Dave Spiers to create Twiddly.Bits MIDI samples in 1993. Today there are over 20 Twiddly.Bits MIDI sample libraries available, all generated by professional musicians playing MIDI instruments. In recent years, Keyfax NewMedia has developed MIDISamples.com for hip hop producers and chopz.com as a vehicle for licensing, and is developing a MIDI-based Music LLM.

=== Yamaha Connection ===
Yamaha approached Colbeck to create content library for the Yamaha RM1x. Its success led to preliminary work on the Yamaha Motif Keyboard (including content licensing). For the next several years (and counting) Yamaha would time and time again approach Colbeck and Keyfax to create content, instructional videos/DVDs and websites for their products.

== Art and Science of Sound Recording (ASSR) ==
Based on his longstanding relationship with fellow music technology geek Alan Parsons, Colbeck formed a partnership with Parsons to distill Parsons's knowledge of music recording and production, creating "Alan Parsons' Art and Science of Sound Recording". The original ASSR course was released on DVD in 2010 to critical acclaim. This was followed by "ASSR: the Book", first published in 2012, with an expanded, revised edition published in 2014. There then followed an ongoing series of expanded offerings including on-line courses and live training events and workshops.

== Discography ==
=== Singles ===
- Greep Gemini (1974) (Charisma)
- Greep Mr Sympathy (1975) (Charisma)
- Charlie – multiple (1977–80)

=== Albums ===
- Charlie No Second Chance (1977) (Janus / Polydor)
- Charlie Lines (1978) (Janus / Polydor)
- Charlie Fight Dirty (1979) (Arista)
- Charlie Here Comes Trouble (1981) (Polydor)
- Sean Delaney Highway (1980) (CBS)
- Vitamin Z Vitamin Z (1985) (Phonogram)
- ABWH Live At The NEC Oct 24th 1989 (1990)
- Various Rime of the Ancient Sampler (1992) (VoicePrint)
- Steve Hackett Time Lapse (1992) (Kudos)
- Steve Hackett Live! (1992) (Castle Music Pictures)
- Yes Symphonic Music of Yes (1993) (BMG)
- ABWH An Evening of Yes Music Plus (1994)
- Julian Colbeck Back To Bach (1994) (EG/Virgin)
- Steve Hackett Guitar Noir (1996)
- Steve Hackett Blues with a Feeling (1995) (Kudos)
- Charlie Fight Dirty/Good Morning America (1996) (Renaissance)
- Steve Hackett Your Own Special Way (1996) (Dureco)
- Steve Hackett Genesis Revisited (1996) (Reef Recordings)
- Steve Hackett & Julian Colbeck There Are Many Sides to the Night (1997)
- Steve Hackett Live Archive 70,80,90's (2001)
- Steve Hackett & Friends The Tokyo Tapes (1999)
- Steve Hackett, Darktown (2001)
- Charlie Charlie Anthology (Renaissance) (2006)
- Jon Anderson Watching The Flags That Fly (VoicePrint 2007)
- Charlie Kitchens of Distinction (VoicePrint) 2009
- Steve Hackett Wuthering Nights double DVD and double CD set from the live tour recordings. {Sony 2018}
- Steve Hackett Access All Areas (2014) (Edsel Records)
- Charlie Elysium (2015) (Floating World)
- Steve Hackett Broken Skies Outspread Wings (2018) (Inside Out Music, Wolfwork Records, Sony Music)

== Publications ==
Abridged list of publications:

- Keyfax, A Buyers Guide To Electronic Keyboards (Virgin)
- Keyfax 2 (Virgin)
- Keyfax 3 (Music Maker Publications)
- Keyfax 4 (Music Maker Publications)
- Keyfax 5 (Music Maker Publications)
- Keyfax Omnibus Edition (Mix Books)
- How To Make A Hit Record (Anaya)
- RockSchool 2 (BBC Publications)
- Rock Talk (WH Allen)
- Zappa – A Biography (WH Allen)
- What MIDI (Music Maker Publications)
- Recipes From Le Manoir Aux Quat' Saisons (with Raymond Blanc) (Macdonald / Orbis)
- Alan Parsons' Art & Science of Sound Recording—The Book (with Alan Parsons) (Hal Leonard)

== DVDs/Videos ==
Often taking on dual roles of director and script writer, Colbeck has been the driving creative force behind numerous music-related DVDs and videos, including:

- Analogue Heaven
- Getting the Most Out of Series (Korg M1, and Home Recording Vols 1,2,3)
- Get Motifated Series, For the Yamaha Motif Classic & Yamaha Motif ES, Volumes 1, 2 & 3) (Winning a Videographers award)
- The O1xperience (a guide for the Yamaha O1x mixer/interface)
- Exploring Sound Reinforcement (How-to on live sound set up)
- The Complete Guide to the Motif ES
- S90 Under Control (Yamaha S90 Master Class)
- Go Mo (Yamaha MO 6/8 Keyboard)
- World of Motif XS
- Motif XS Master Class
- Making Beats on the Yamaha MM6 (Top honors at 2008 Aurora Awards in Art / Culture Instructions)
- Using Cubase 4 Recording the Band
- Sound Advice (with host sound programmer Dave Polich)
- Universal Audio Studio on Screen
- Alan Parsons Live in Madrid
- Drum Programming Secrets
- Steve Hackett The Tokyo Tapes, Camino Records, crown studios, 16-18 Crown Road, Twickenham, UK, tw1, 3ee, UK
- Alan Parsons’ Art and Science of Sound Recording (2010)
- Motif XF Fully Loaded (2011)
- Discovering The Yamaha MOX (2012)
- MOXF In 'N' Out (2013)
- Music Production on the Yamaha Motif (2014)

== Personal life ==
Colbeck has two children Abi, born 1988, and Cameron born 1992.
