= Quiet World =

British pop rock band

Quiet World were an English pop rock band formed by The Heather Brothers John, Lee, and Neil Heather in 1969; to record their concept album The Road. The group consisted of John (vocals, songwriting), Lea (vocals, songwriting), and Neil (songwriting), as well as Steve Hackett (lead guitar) and his brother John Hackett (flute, guitar), Dick Driver (bass) (who would eventually appear in Steve Hackett's band), Gill Gilbert (backing vocals), Phil Henderson (keyboards), Eddy Hines (flute), and Sean O'Mally (drums).

A 7" single "Miss Whittington" / "There is a Mountain" was released on the Dawn label in 1969 (as The Quiet World of Lea & John) and Quiet World released their debut album The Road in 1970. Shortly thereafter, Steve Hackett left to join the progressive rock group Genesis as lead guitarist. The album was re-released on CD in 1999.

The Heather Brothers went on to international success with their musicals, A Slice of Saturday Night, Lust and thriller Blood Money. Their shows have enjoyed hundreds of productions worldwide and have been translated into nine languages. They also wrote, directed and produced two films, Seriously Twisted and The Big Finish, and wrote the stage musical, Camp Horror.

Phil Henderson composed the score for The Far Pavilions at Shaftesbury Theatre, London, in 2005. The Philip Henderson Orchestra features on Steve Hackett's Feedback 86 album.

== Personnel ==
- Dick Driver - upright bass, electric bass
- Gill Gilbert - backing vocals
- Steve Hackett - electric & acoustic guitars
- John Hackett - flute, acoustic guitars
- John Heather - lead vocals, acoustic guitars, songwriting
- Lea Heather - lead vocals, percussion, songwriting
- Neil Heather - songwriting
- Phil Henderson - piano, organ, trumpet, recorder, arrangement, backing vocals
- Eddy Hines - flute, saxophone
- Sean O'Mally - drums, percussion

== Discography ==
- The Road (1970; Dawn)
