= A Slice of Saturday Night =

Musical

- Music: The Heather Brothers
- Lyrics: The Heather Brothers
- Book: The Heather Brothers
- Productions: 1989

A Slice of Saturday Night is a musical with book, lyrics and music by The Heather Brothers: Lea, Neil, Charles and John. The songs are a nostalgic pastiche of 1960s music, and the story tells a tale of teenage dreams and young love "set around 1964 in a nightclub called the Club-a-Go-Go".

== The Heather Brothers ==
The Heather Brothers were born in London and grew up in Zimbabwe, where they started the rock group The Chequers, touring Zimbabwe and South Africa. When they returned to England they were signed, along with Tammy Jones, by Mrs Wallich of Delyse Records to form a folk group, The Three People, and released a number of singles through EMI. After touring Germany they split up and the brothers formed the progressive rock band The Quiet World, recruiting arranger Philip Henderson and guitarist Steve Hackett (who went on to join Genesis). After releasing a number of singles for PYE and The Road album on PYE's progressive label, Dawn, they broke up the band and moved into contemporary music. Along with Henderson they formed a new orchestra using final year students from the Royal College and Royal Academy of Music, recording the orchestral album, Etheral Conception and the choral works 'Rebirth' and 'Seascape' for Starday King. They were then signed by Elvis Presley's publisher, Freddy Bienstock as contract songwriters to his publishing house Carlin Music. Soon after the brothers began writing musicals. A Slice of Saturday Night is their most successful musical and was followed by Lust, which played at the Haymarket Theatre. Other musicals include Big Sin City, The Comeback, Love Bites, Sin $ Salvation and Camp Horror, the thrillers Blood Money and Seriously Twisted and the comedy Oz And The Pom. 'Bobby Dallas After Party' they co-wrote with Mark Nassar and Brooke Lundy. The Heather Brothers have also written and directed two films, The Big Finish and Seriously Twisted.

== Productions ==
A Slice of Saturday Night was first produced in April 1989 by the Brighton Actors Theatre at the Nightingale pub in Brighton with Simon Lovat, Billy Lomas, Roy Smiles, Grania Smith, Sarah Clarke, Jannette Eddisford, Mitch Johnston and Binky Baker. It was performed at the King's Head Theatre, Islington in August 1989 and then made its West End début at London's Arts Theatre on September 27, 1989. The musical was directed by Marc Urquhart and starred Binky Baker as Eric, David Easter as Gary and Terry, Lisa Hollander as Bridget, Mitch Munroe as Sharon, Georgia Mitchell as Sue, James Powell as Rick, Roy Smiles as Eddie and Debi Thomson as Penny and Shirl.

Following national and foreign tours, the musical returned to the West End at the Strand Theatre in the autumn of 1993 for a twelve-week run, starring pop star Sonia as Sue and Dennis Waterman as Eric. The musical has enjoyed more than 300 productions worldwide since then, including an off-Broadway production under the name Café a Go Go and has been translated into nine languages. A new shortened version of A Slice Of Saturday Night has been chosen by Cunard as their signature show on the Queen Elizabeth cruise ship. With a cast of 29 it will be the largest production Cunard has ever staged.

A London Revival was staged at Upstairs at the Gatehouse between 16 December 2010 and 30 January 2011 and produced by in-house company Ovation.

This has become a popular show to be performed in schools and colleges - often as part of a BTEC programme. When performed in schools, some songs are omitted due to the lyrical content, which may be felt somewhat unsuitable for under 16s to perform.

== Synopsis ==
Seven teenagers dance and eye each other and flirt on a Saturday night at popular Club A Go Go in a town in the British provinces. Sue is going out with Gary, but he flirts with Penny and the other girls at every opportunity. Sharon and Rick like each other but are too shy to tell each other. Eddie is challenged by the boys to persuade "frigid" Bridget to "touch his whatsit" by closing time, over the course of the night he tries everything, with very little success. The owner of the club, ageing rocker Eric "Rubber-legs" De Vene, watches and lends an ear to the young people as they navigate the rituals of teenage fashion, music, sexual mores and relationships.

== Songs ==
Act 1

- A Slice Of Saturday Night - Company
- Club A-Go-Go - Eric
- Waiting - Bridget, Sue, Sharon and Penny
- Saturday Chat - Company
- Seventeen - Rick, Sharon and Eric
- Don't Touch Me - Eddie, Eric, Gary and Rick
- Don't Touch Me (Reprise) - Bridget
- Twiggy - Sue
- Cliff - Eric and Company
- Love On Our Side - Terry & Shirl
- What Do I Do now? - Sharon & Rick
- What Do You Do? - Company
- If You Want To Have Fun - Eric & Company
- The Long Walk Back - Rick
- Romance/Wham Bam - Company
- The Boy Of My Dreams - Bridget & Eddie
- It Wouldn't Be Saturday Night Without A Fight - Eric and Company

Act 2

- Eric's Hokey Cokey - Eric and Company
- I Fancy You - Rick and Sharon
- Sentimental Eyes - Sharon and Rick
- Heartbreaker - Sue, Bridget, Penny, Sharon and Gary
- Eric's Gonna Keep Doin’ - Eric, Gary and Rick
- Gang Bang Mania-Bertha
- Oh So Bad - Eddie and Gary
- Please Don't Tell Me - Company
- You're Oh So... - Sue, Bridget, Sharon, Penny and Gary
- Lies - Eric, Gary, Eddie and Rick
- Baby I Love You - Gary, Sue, Birds and Blokes
- PE - Gary
- Who'd Be Seventeen - Eric
- Last Saturday Night - Rick and Sharon
- A Slice Of Saturday Night/Club A Go-Go (Reprise) - Company
