= John Hackett (musician) =

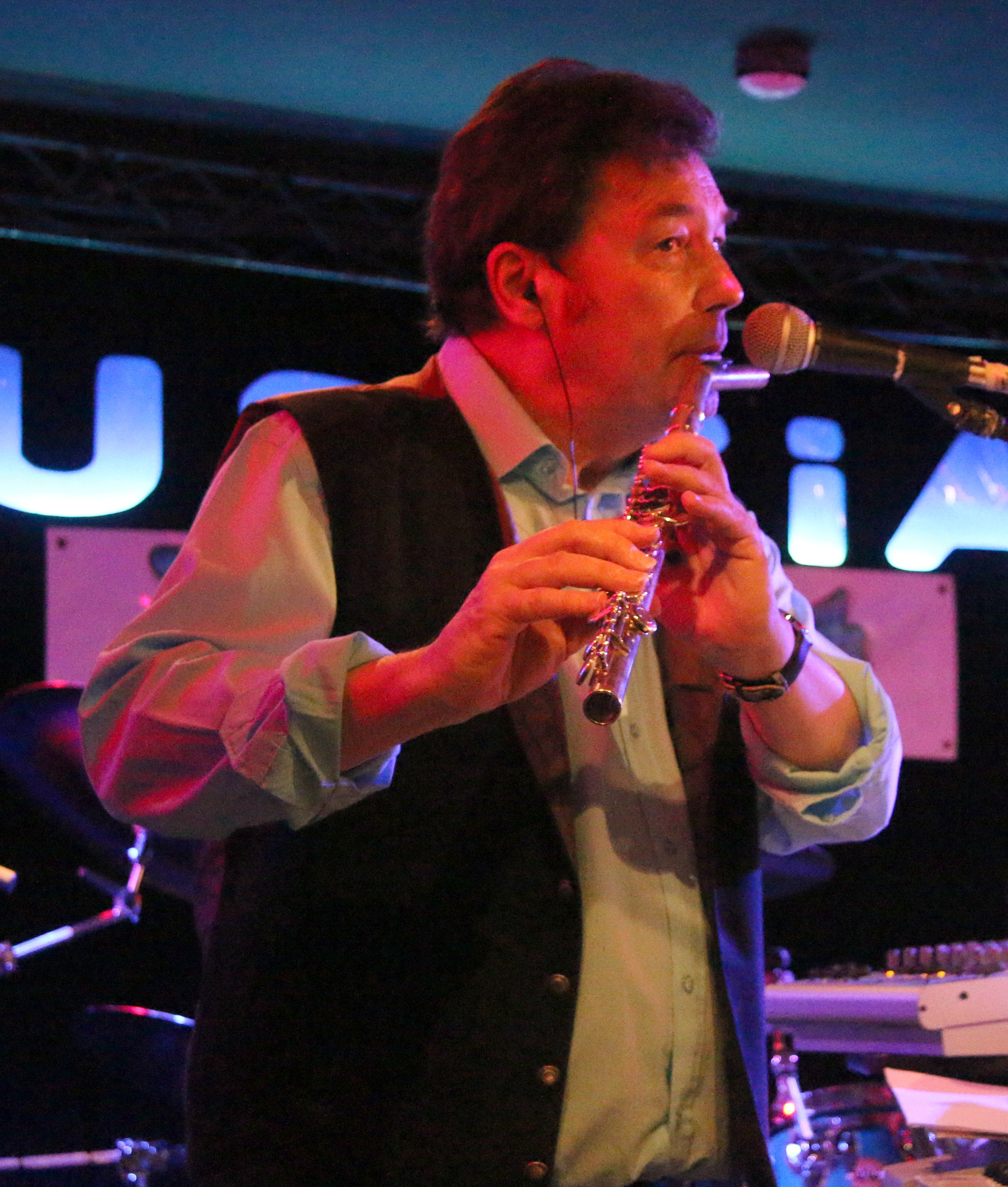
- John Hackett in 2018

Background information
- Born: 13 March 1955 (age 71)
- Genres: Progressive rock; ambient; classical
- Occupations: Musician; songwriter
- Instruments: Flute; guitar; keyboards; vocals
- Years active: 1974-present
- Member of: John Hackett Band
- Formerly of: Steve Hackett Band

John Hackett (born 13 March 1955) is a British musician, the younger brother of guitarist Steve Hackett. Although his primary instrument is the flute, he also plays guitar, bass, bass pedals and keyboards.

== Early career ==
Hackett had both classical and rock music backgrounds. His early career was mostly as part of his brother's band, appearing on many early albums and touring until 1983. By then, he had already made guest contributions to other albums, such as Anthony Phillips's debut solo album The Geese and the Ghost.

He has played with ensembles such as The English Flute Quartet and the Westminster Camerata, and as a founder-member of the relaxation and ambient music group, Symbiosis. He has also maintained a strong output from session work with a variety of artists and projects.

== Solo work ==
From 2004, John has been regularly releasing solo albums, taking in classical, folk, and rock stylings. In 2005, Checking Out of London was released, a rock album produced with Nick Magnus, and with the majority of the lyrics by Nick Clabburn. This was followed up in 2015 with a second rock album, Another Life, also with the involvement of Magnus and Clabburn.

== With Nick Magnus ==
Since being in Steve Hackett's band together, John and Nick Magnus have often collaborated, recording and performing together many times.

== With Marco Lo Muscio ==
John has worked alongside Italian organist Marco Lo Muscio throughout the 2000s, often performing organ/piano/flute duets in live performances across Europe (UK, Italy, Germany, Poland, France). There are few recordings of them together, though Hackett played on Lo Muscio's The Book of Bilbo and Gandalf album, and they collaborated on the Playing The History project with Steve Hackett.
In 2019 they published the first official album in DUO, On the Wings of the Wind, with Stradivarius.

== With Nick Fletcher ==
Since 2012, John has collaborated with Classical guitarist Nick Fletcher. They have performed as a flute/guitar duo across England and recorded two albums of instrumental music, the first of which also featured Steve Hackett.

== John Hackett Band ==
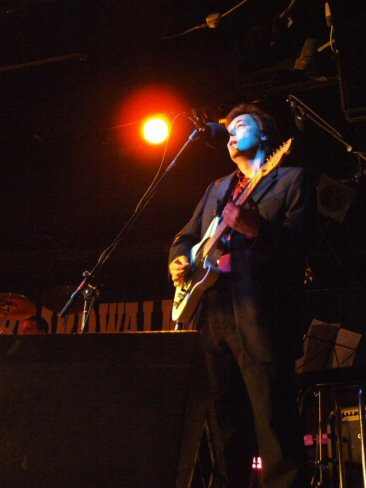
Hackett in 2006

In 2005, a short lived band existed to promote Checking Out of London, featuring Nick Magnus on keyboards and Tony Patterson on vocals, along with various members of the Genesis tribute band, ReGenesis.

To support the release of Another Life, a trio was formed with John (guitars, keys, vocals), Nick Fletcher (lead guitar) and Duncan Parsons (percussion, vocals), which was soon expanded to a full band with the addition of Jeremy Richardson (bass, guitars, vocals) and Duncan moving to full drum kit.

The band started public performances as the John Hackett Band in 2016, their debut album We Are Not Alone was released in 2017 through Esoteric Antenna Records as a double CD set of a studio album and a live album recorded in 2016.

In 2025 a second album, Red Institution, was announced and released in April that year.

== Discography ==
=== Solo releases ===
- 2004 – Velvet Afternoon – for Flute and Piano
- 2005 – Checking Out of London
- 2006 – Red Planet Rhythm
- 2011 – Moonspinner – for Flute and Guitar
- 2013 – Overnight Snow – for Flute and Guitar
- 2015 – Another Life
- 2016 – Hills of Andalucia, with Nick Fletcher
- 2018 – Beyond the Stars, with Nick Fletcher
- 2020 – The Piper Plays His Tune

=== John Hackett and Steve Hackett ===
- 2000 – Sketches of Satie

=== John Hackett With Steve Hackett and Chris Glassfield ===
- 2008 : Prelude To Summer For Flute & Guitar

=== John Hackett and Nick Magnus ===
- 2011 – Live 2010 (John Hackett & Nick Magnus, Magick Nuns Records MNCD1003)

=== John Hackett Band ===
- 2017 – We Are Not Alone
- 2025 – Red Institution

=== with Steve Hackett ===
- 1975 – Voyage of the Acolyte
- 1978 – Please Don't Touch
- 1979 – Spectral Mornings
- 1980 – Defector
- 1981 – Cured
- 1983 – Bay of Kings
- 1988 – Momentum
- 1992 – Time Lapse (live)
- 1992 – The Unauthorised Biography
- 1996 – Watcher of the Skies: Genesis Revisited
- 1997 – A Midsummer Night's Dream
- 1998 – Darktown
- 2001 – Live Archive
- 2002 – Guitare Classique
- 2002 – Hungarian Horizons (DVD)
- 2003 – To Watch the Storms
- 2005 – Metamorpheus
- 2006 – Wild Orchids
- 2009 – Out of the Tunnel's Mouth
- 2011 – Beyond the Shrouded Horizon
- 2012 – Genesis Revisited II
- 2014 – Access All Areas
- 2017 – The Night Siren
- 2018 – Wuthering Nights (live)

=== Beatrix Players ===
- 2023 – Living & Alive

=== With others ===
- 1970 – The Road (Quiet World) – With Steve Hackett, Dik Driver, etc.
- 1977 – The Geese and the Ghost (Anthony Phillips) – With Mike Rutherford & Phil Collins.
- 1979 – Sides (Anthony Phillips)
- 1988 – Tears of the Moon (Symbiosis; reissued on CD, 2001)
- 1988 – The Song of the Peach Tree Spring (Symbiosis)
- 1991 – Mirage And Reality (Mae McKenna)
- 1992 – Touching the Clouds (Symbiosis)
- 1994 – Lake of Dreams (Symbiosis)
- 1995 – Autumn Days (Symbiosis)
- 1996 – Amber and Jade (Symbiosis)
- 1999 – Inhaling Green (Nick Magnus)
- 1999 – Sea of Light (Symbiosis)
- 2002 – The Comfort Zone (Symbiosis)
- 2004 – Battle of the Birds: A Celtic Tale (Anthony Phillips & Harry Williamson With Didier Malherbe Narrated By Gilli Smyth)
- 2004 – Hexameron (Nick Magnus)
- 2005 – Dancing in Your Dreams (Symbiosis)
- 2009 – JL (Algebra)
- 2010 – The Book of Bilbo and Gandalf (Marco Lo Muscio)
- 2010 – Children of Another God (Nick Magnus)
- 2011 – Oddity (Franck Carducci)
- 2012 – "The Rome Pro(G)ject feat. Steve Hackett and John Hackett" cd single – (TRP Records)
- 2012 – "The Rome Pro(G)ject (feat. Steve and John Hackett Nick Magnus David Cross, David Jackson, Richard Sinclair, Francesco Di Giacomo, Vincenzo Ricca and others) – (TRP Records)
- 2012 – Abandoned Buildings (Duncan Parsons)
- 2013 – Playing the History – for Flute, Organ, Piano, Bass, Guitar & Saxophone, with Marco Lo Muscio, Steve Hackett, Carlo Matteucci, David Jackson, & Giorgio Gabriel
- 2014 – C:Ore (Duncan Parsons)
- 2014 – Odysseas (Syndone)
- 2014 – A New Day (Narrow Pass)
- 2015 – Les Chateaux De La Loire (Ellesmere)
- 2017 – Joyce Choice in the cd Winter Tales by Giorgio Coslovich
- 2017 – Air & Grace – Relaxing Music for Flute with Symbiosis (Compilation)
- 2017 – Prog Alchemia (Playing The History)
- 2019 – On the Wings of the Wind by John Hackett and Marco Lo Muscio
- 2020 – Wyrd (Ellesmere)
- 2020 – Common Sense Dancing (Duncan Parsons)
- 2022 – On Earth, As It Is (Duncan Parsons)
