= Symphonic Music of Yes =

- CD Cover

Studio album by London Philharmonic Orchestra
- Released: 26 October 1993
- Recorded: 12 July 1993 – 9 August 1993
- Genre: Progressive rock, symphonic rock
- Length: 54:56
- Label: RCA Victor
- Producer: Steve Howe; Dee Palmer; Alan Parsons

Professional ratings
Review scores
Source	Rating
AllMusic	1.5/5 stars

Symphonic Music of Yes is a 1993 album by the London Philharmonic Orchestra, covering songs of the progressive rock band Yes, with the English Chamber Orchestra and the London Community Gospel Choir. The arrangements were by Dee Palmer. Playing on the album were Yes guitarist Steve Howe and Yes drummer Bill Bruford. Some tracks also featured Yes vocalist Jon Anderson and featured the ABWH additional keyboardist Julian Colbeck.

== Track listing ==
- Music by Yes; Arranged and conducted by Dee Palmer
1. "Roundabout" – 6:10
2. "Close to the Edge" – 7:39
3. "Wonderous Stories" – 3:52
4. "I've Seen All Good People" – 3:50
5. "Mood for a Day" – 3:03
6. "Owner of a Lonely Heart" – 4:43
7. "Survival" – 4:16
8. "Heart of the Sunrise" – 7:49
9. "Soon" – 6:17
10. "Starship Trooper" – 7:17

== Personnel ==
Musicians

- Jon Anderson – vocals (on tracks 1 & 4)
- Steve Howe – electric guitar, 6 & 12 string acoustic guitars, Spanish guitar, steel guitar, Dobro guitar, mandolin, backing vocals
- Dee Palmer – synthesizer, grand piano, vocoder, Hammond organ
- Tim Harries – bass
- Bill Bruford – drums
- The London Philharmonic Orchestra (LPO) on tracks 1 to 4, 6, 8 to 10
- The London Community Gospel Choir on tracks 4 and 7
- The English Chamber Orchestra (ECO) on tracks 5 and 7

Production

- Roger Dean – artwork
- Pete Smith – executive producer
- Steve Vining – executive producer
- Alan Parsons – orchestra mixer and engineer
