= Momentum (Steve Hackett album) =

Studio album by Steve Hackett
- Released: 28 March 1988
- Recorded: 1987–88
- Genre: Contemporary classical
- Length: 44:07
- Label: Start Records, Ltd.
- Producer: Steve Hackett and John Acock

Steve Hackett chronology
Till We Have Faces (1984)	Momentum (1988)	Time Lapse (1992)

Professional ratings
Review scores
Source	Rating
Allmusic	3.5/5 stars

Momentum is the ninth solo album by guitarist Steve Hackett. It is Hackett's second album consisting mainly of classical guitar pieces. Hackett's younger brother, John, plays the flute on the album. The album was re-released on Hackett's Camino Records label in 2001, with three bonus tracks. The cover was designed by artist Kim Poor.

== Track listing ==
All songs written by Steve Hackett, except where indicated.

1. "Cavalcanti" – 6:13
2. "The Sleeping Sea" – 3:27
3. "Portrait of a Brazilian Lady" – 5:15
4. "When the Bell Breaks" – 3:03
5. "A Bed, A Chair and a Guitar" (Steve Hackett, traditional) – 2:44
6. "Concert for Munich" – 4:55
7. "Last Rites of Innocence" – 5:28
8. "Troubled Spirit" – 2:30
9. "Variation on a Theme by Chopin" – 4:55
10. "Pierrot" – 2:53
11. "Momentum" – 2:38

1994 bonus tracks

1. "Bourée" (Johann Sebastian Bach) – 1:34
2. "An Open Window" – 9:02
3. "The Vigil" – 6:19

== Personnel ==
- Steve Hackett – guitars, keyboards
- John Hackett – flute
