= Till We Have Faces (Steve Hackett album) =

Studio album by Steve Hackett
- Released: September 1984
- Recorded: 1983–84
- Genre: Progressive rock, world
- Length: 41:02 (1994 CD release: 52:09)
- Label: Lamborghini Records (UK & Europe); Chrysalis (US & Canada)
- Producer: Steve Hackett

Steve Hackett chronology
Bay of Kings (1983)	Till We Have Faces (1984)	Momentum (1988)

Professional ratings
Review scores
Source	Rating
Allmusic	3/5 stars
Kerrang!	(favorable)

Till We Have Faces is the eighth solo album by guitarist Steve Hackett. The album is rock, with elements of world music. The majority of the album was recorded in Brazil, while the final mixing was done in London. The name of the album comes from a novel by C.S.Lewis, whose work is a long-time influence on Hackett.

As with most of Steve Hackett's records, the sleeve painting was created by his wife at the time, Kim Poor, the Brazilian artist, under the title Silent Sorrow in Empty Boats, after an instrumental piece by Hackett's former group Genesis, on the album The Lamb Lies Down on Broadway.

"A Doll That's Made in Japan" was released as a single. The 7" featured an instrumental version of the song on the B-side. The 12" featured a longer version of the A-side and an exclusive track, "Just the Bones". Apart from the 7" A-side, none of the tracks appeared on the album or its 1994 re-issue.

== Track listing (original LP/CD version) ==
1. "Duel" (Steve Hackett) – 4:50
2. "Matilda Smith-Williams Home for the Aged" (Hackett, Nick Magnus) – 8:04
3. "Let Me Count the Ways" (Hackett) – 6:06
4. "A Doll That's Made in Japan" (Hackett) – 3:57
5. "Myopia" (Hackett, Magnus) – 2:56
6. "What's My Name" (Hackett, Magnus) – 7:05
7. "The Rio Connection" (Hackett) – 3:24
8. "Taking the Easy Way Out" (Hackett) – 3:49
9. "When You Wish upon a Star" (Ned Washington, Leigh Harline) – 0:51

=== Track listing (1994 CD reissue) ===
1. "What's My Name" – 7:06
2. "The Rio Connection" – 3:21
3. "Matilda Smith-Williams Home for the Aged" (modified version) – 8:07
4. "Let Me Count the Ways" – 6:06
5. "A Doll That's Made in Japan" – 3:57
6. "Duel" – 4:48
7. "Myopia" – 2:56
8. "Taking the Easy Way Out" – 3:50
9. "The Gulf" – 6:33
10. "Stadiums of the Damned" – 4:37
11. "When You Wish Upon a Star" – 0:48

Notes: Bonus tracks "The Gulf" and "Stadiums of the Damned" were from the (then) unreleased Feedback 86. The version of "The Gulf" heard here is missing a brief intro, is faded out early, and has added backing vocals.

The modified version of "Matilda" has added vocals and a different instrumental midsection.

== Personnel ==
- Steve Hackett – guitars, guitar synth, koto, rainstick, Etruscan guitar, marimba, percussion, harmonica, vocals
- Nick Magnus – keyboards, percussion, drum programming
- Rui Mota – drums
- Sérgio Lima – drums
- Ian Mosley – drums, percussion
- Waldemar Falcão – flute, percussion
- Fernando Moura – Rhodes piano
- Ronaldo Diamante – bass
- Clive Stevens – wind synthesizer
- Kim Poor – Japanese voice on "Doll"
- The Brazilian Percussionists – Sidinho Moreira, Junior Homrich, Jaburu, Peninha, Zizinho, Baca

== Charts ==
Chart (1984)	Peak position
UK Albums (OCC)	54

== See also ==
- Till We Have Faces – A novel by C.S. Lewis
