= Burning Flame (song) =

Single by Vitamin Z

from the album Rites of Passage
- B-side: "Dancers of Eve"
- Released: 1984
- Genre: New wave
- Length: 3:51
- Label: Mercury (UK); Geffen (U.S. & Canada)
- Songwriter(s): Geoff Barradale, Nick Lockwood, Philip Jesson
- Producer(s): Chris Hughes, Ross Cullum

Vitamin Z singles chronology
"Burning Flame" (1984)	"Circus Ring (We Scream About)" (1985)

"Burning Flame" is the debut single by English new wave band Vitamin Z, released in 1984. It is from their debut album, Rites of Passage. The song was produced by former Adam and the Ants drummer Chris Hughes, and Ross Cullum. It charted in both the UK and U.S., peaking at numbers 80 and 73, respectively. It also reached No. 27 on the Billboard Dance Club Songs chart. It is the band's best known and most successful song.

== Reception ==
John Leland of Spin wrote, "Nothing happens in the song or in the mix. The band hasn't got enough ideas to fill the tune, let alone extend it. Plus the dreary melody and self-pitying lyrics are pathetic. How dare they call this wet rag "Burning Flame"?"

== Charts ==
Chart (1984–85)	Peak position
UK Singles (OCC)	80
US Billboard Hot 100	73
US Hot Dance/Club Play (Billboard)	27
