= Charlie (band) =

British rock band

- Origin: United Kingdom
- Genre: Rock
- Years active: 1971–1986, 2009–2015
- Label: Polydor
- Past members: Terry Thomas; John Anderson; Steve Gadd; Martin Smith; Julian Colbeck; Eugene Organ; Shep Lonsdale; Bob Henrit; John Verity; Terry Slesser; Graham Broad; Richard Cottle; Felix Krish; Linda Thomas
- Website: charlie-music.com

Charlie was a British rock band formed in 1971 by singer/songwriter Terry Thomas. The group was most active as a recording unit from the mid-1970s to 1986. Charlie never charted in the UK but had four minor hits in the US: "Johnny Hold Back" (1977) "She Loves to Be In Love" (1978), "Killer Cut" (1979) and "It's Inevitable" (1983).

== History ==
The band was briefly called "Charlie Cuckoo" (after a racehorse), but soon became known simply as "Charlie". The original members were:

- Terry Thomas – lead vocals, guitar
- John Anderson – backing vocals, bass
- Steve Gadd – drums (not to be confused with the American session drummer of the same name)
- Martin Smith – backing vocals, guitar

The band debuted as a recording act in 1973, issuing the non-charting single "I Need Your Love" on Decca in the UK. Although the band had a contract for four singles with Decca, only one more ("Knocking Down Your Door") was recorded, and it was never released.

Three years later, Charlie released their first album, Fantasy Girls. Thomas was Charlie's primary songwriter for this and all future albums, although he also collaborated with other band members from time to time. Charlie supported The Who at their 1975 Hammersmith Odeon Christmas shows and toured the UK in spring 1976 as a support act to the Dutch progressive rock band Focus to promote the album. Smith left after the first album and was replaced by the keyboard player Julian Colbeck.

The group's second album, No Second Chance, began the practice of having a photograph of a female model as the album's cover. "Johnny Hold Back", from that album, was Charlie's first chart entry, peaking at No. 96 in the US. Thomas also produced the album, with John Anderson. All future Charlie releases were produced by Thomas, usually in association with one or more band members.

Eugene Organ was added as a fifth member on guitar for the following two albums, Lines in 1978 and Fight Dirty in 1979. The band had its biggest hit in 1978 with "She Loves to Be In Love", which peaked at No. 54 in the US. In the following year, the band had another minor hit with "Killer Cut", which rose to No. 60 in the US. By this time, Shep Lonsdale had been added as an official sixth member, playing drums and percussion alongside Gadd on all of Fight Dirty.

Colbeck and Organ departed in 1980 following the completion of recording for the band's fifth album, Here Comes Trouble, amid some internal turmoil. Colbeck wrote, "Finally, the touring band line-up of Terry Thomas, John Anderson, Eugene Organ, Steve Gadd, and myself ceased operations once Arista refused to release Here Comes Trouble, and our caring, sharing management company immediately cut off all our money in 1980. That's a whole other story but, for the record, our final gig was in 1979 at the Civic Center in Providence, Rhode Island on Monday 29 October, alongside Foreigner". Thomas commented, "Arista our new label in the U.S. wanted more songs – our company in the UK – Trident Audio Productions – refused to put us in the studio or spend any more money. The UK record company – Polydor – wouldn't release it until it had a U.S. release. Effectively, Charlie had no record label and no money to live on. Eugene and Julian decided to leave".

In 1981 a reorganised Charlie issued the album Good Morning America for RCA Records. Produced by Thomas and John Verity, the band now consisted of Thomas, Anderson, Gadd, Verity (vocals, guitar, formerly with the band Argent) and second drummer Bob Henrit (also ex-Argent). (Lonsdale had moved on to work for the band Toto as a sound engineer, mixing their live shows.) The previously unissued Here Comes Trouble, recorded in 1980, was finally released in 1982, albeit only in Europe.

In 1982 Verity left to pursue a solo career and Terry Slesser joined the group as the new lead singer, while Thomas, still a member of the band, began concentrating more on the instrumentation. In 1983, the group had their most successful hit single, "It's Inevitable", which peaked at No. 38. The MTV music video showed a humorous kitchen pie fight. On the American Top 40 countdown show from 20 August 1983, Casey Kasem informed listeners about a "slight discrepancy" on the previous show from 13 August. There "Pieces of Ice" by Diana Ross had been played as the song at No. 38 on the countdown but actually was at No. 45. The real No. 38 song would have been "It's inevitable" by Charlie. The accompanying album, Charlie, was a flop, however, and the band soon folded.

In 1986, Thomas resurrected the band identity, while essentially working as a solo artist. For the 1986 Charlie album In Pursuit of Romance, Thomas is the only credited band member, though there are some contributions made by session musicians. Thomas wrote, "This was basically a contractual album – Steve had gone off to work with Iron Maiden as a drum tech and John had a job in the telecommunications industry. I ended up making the whole album by myself – it put me in the hospital!"

After a long lay off, in 2009 Charlie released the first album of new material in 23 years, Kitchens Of Distinction. It began life as a Terry Thomas solo project, but as the finished product included contributions from Martin Smith and Julian Colbeck amongst others, the decision was made to credit the CD to Charlie.

Gadd died on 27 March 2013 after a year-long battle with cancer.

Charlie released what was billed as a final album, Elysium, in late 2015. The band then consisted of Terry Thomas (vocals, guitar), Andy Bloom (guitar), Elliot Thomas (guitar), Martin Smith (steel guitar), Julian Colbeck (keyboards), Charlie Barratt (bass) and Steve Alexander (drums).

== Members ==
Final line-up:

- Terry Thomas: lead and backing vocals, guitar, bass (1971–1986, 2009–2015)
- Martin Smith: guitar, backing vocals (1971–1977, 2009–2015)
- Julian Colbeck: keyboards (1977–1980, 2009–2015)
- Steve Alexander: drums (2009–2015)

Former members:

- John Verity: lead vocals, guitar (1981)
- Terry Slesser: lead vocals (1982–1984)
- Eugene Organ: guitar (1978–1980)
- John Anderson: bass, backing vocals (1971–1984)
- Richard Cottle: keyboards, saxophone (1986)
- Bradley: Guitars, backing vocals (1976-1979
- Felix Krish: bass, keyboards, backing vocals (1986)
- Steve Gadd: drums (1971–1984)
- Shep Lonsdale: drums (1979)
- Bob Henrit: drums (1981–1983)
- Graham Broad: drums (1986)
- Linda Thomas: backing vocals (1986)

== Discography ==
=== Albums ===
- Fantasy Girls (1976)
- No Second Chance (1977) - No. 111 in US
- Lines (1978) - No. 75 in US
- Fight Dirty (1979) - No. 60 in US
- Good Morning America (1981) - No. 201 in US
- Here Comes Trouble (1982)
- Charlie (1983) - No. 145 in US
- In Pursuit of Romance (1986)
- Kitchens of Distinction (2009)
- Elysium (2015)

=== Compilation albums ===
- Charlie Anthology (2007)
- No Second Chance (Limited Edition Vinyl) (2020)
- Lines (Limited Edition Vinyl) (2020)

Note that in earlier editions of Joel Whitburn's Billboard chart books, a Charlie album called Fifth Flight is listed as having charted in 1981 at No. 99. This album did not exist, and never charted — its inclusion in Whitburn's book is either an error or a deliberate copyright trap. In any event, later editions of Whitburn's books (post-2006) make no mention of it.

=== Singles ===
- "I Need Your Love" (1973)
- "First Class Traveller" (1976)
- "I'm Turning to You" (1976) - No. 96 in the US
- "Johnny Hold Back" (1977)
- "She Loves To Be In Love" (1978) - No. 54 in the US
- "Watching TV" (1978)
- "Fight Dirty" (1979)
- "Killer Cut" (1979) - No. 60 in the US
- "Perfect Lover" (1981)
- "Fool For Your Love" (1981)
- "Five Years" (1982)
- "It's Inevitable" (1983) - No. 38 in the US
- "The Heartaches Begin" (1983)
- "Spend My Life With You" (1983)
