= Genesis Revisited =

Studio album by Steve Hackett
- Released: 1996
- Recorded: 1995–96
- Genre: Progressive rock
- Length: 76:43
- Label: Camino Records; Snapper Music; Guardian Records (US)
- Producer: Steve Hackett

Steve Hackett chronology
Blues with a Feeling (1995)	Genesis Revisited (1996)	A Midsummer Night's Dream (1997)

Genesis Revisited, called Watcher of the Skies: Genesis Revisited in the US, is the 12th studio album by Steve Hackett, paying tribute to his former band, Genesis. It mainly features songs originally released by Genesis during Hackett's tenure with the group (1971–77). The previously unreleased song "Déjà Vu" was started by Peter Gabriel in 1973 during the Selling England by the Pound sessions but not finished and Hackett completed the song for this album. There are also two new songs, "Valley of the Kings" and "Waiting Room Only"; the latter is named after and loosely inspired by "The Waiting Room", an instrumental from the 1974 Genesis album The Lamb Lies Down on Broadway. The original Japanese and Argentine versions of the album have a slightly different track listing and sequence, dropping "Los Endos" (also featured as a bonus track on the Japanese version of The Tokyo Tapes) and containing one extra song called "Riding the Colossus" (also featured as a bonus track on The Tokyo Tapes, specifically on the 2003, 2008 and 2012 reissues). Later Japanese reissues of the album contain the same track listing as the standard international versions.

== Track listing ==
All tracks are written by Tony Banks, Mike Rutherford, Peter Gabriel, Steve Hackett, and Phil Collins, except where noted.

No.	Title	Writer(s)	Original Album	Length
1.	"Watcher of the Skies" (John Wetton)		Foxtrot	8:40
2.	"Dance on a Volcano" (Steve Hackett)	Banks, Collins, Hackett, Rutherford	Trick of the Tail	7:28
3.	"Valley of the Kings"	Jerry Peal, Hackett		6:30
4.	"Déjà Vu" (Paul Carrack)	Gabriel, Hackett		5:55
5.	"Firth of Fifth" (John Wetton)		Selling England by the Pound	9:40
6.	"For Absent Friends" (Colin Blunstone)		Nursery Cryme	3:02
7.	"Your Own Special Way" (Paul Carrack)	Rutherford	Wind and Wuthering	4:19
8.	"The Fountain of Salmacis" (Steve Hackett)		Nursery Cryme	9:54
9.	"Waiting Room Only"	Hackett, Roger King		6:54
10.	"I Know What I Like (In Your Wardrobe)" (Steve Hackett)		Selling England by the Pound	5:37
11.	"Los Endos"	Banks, Collins, Hackett, Rutherford	Trick of the Tail	8:51

== Personnel ==
- Steve Hackett – guitar (1–11), vocals (2, 8, 10), harmonica (9), percussion (11), backing vocals (1, 5), orchestration (1, 4, 5, 6, 8)
- John Wetton – vocals (1, 5), bass (5)
- Paul Carrack – vocals (4, 7)
- Colin Blunstone – vocals (6)
- John Hackett – flute (8)
- Will Bates – saxophone (2, 9, 10)
- Ian McDonald – saxophone (11), flute (11)
- "Spats" King – vibes (10)
- Julian Colbeck – keyboards (1, 2, 8)
- Roger King – additional programming (1, 4, 5, 8), keyboards (4, 9, 10, 11), orchestration (4, 5), programming (9, 11)
- Ben Fenner – additional programming (1, 4, 8), keyboards (5), orchestration (4, 5, 6), programming (5)
- Nick Magnus – keyboards (3), programming (3)
- Jerry Peal – keyboards (3), programming (3)
- Aron Friedman – orchestration (6, 7), keyboards (7, 10), programming (7), piano (10)
- Tony Levin – bass (1)
- Alphonso Johnson – bass (2, 8)
- Pino Palladino – bass (4, 11)
- Bill Bruford – drums (1, 5), percussion (5)
- Chester Thompson – drums (2, 8), additional drums (11)
- Hugo Degenhardt – drums (3, 4, 9, 11)
- Tarquin Bombast – drums (10)
- Richard Macphail – backing vocals (7)
- Jeanne Downs – backing vocals (7)
- Richard Wayler – backing vocals (7)
- The Sanchez/Montoya Chorale (4, 9)
- Anton De Bruck - chorale director
- Royal Philharmonic Orchestra (1, 4, 5, 6, 7, 8)

== Charts ==
Chart (1997)	Peak position
UK Albums (OCC)	95
UK Independent Albums (OCC)	28
