= Time Lapse (album) =

Live album by Steve Hackett
- Released: 1992
- Recorded: November 1981 & October 1990
- Genre: Progressive rock
- Length: 67:35
- Label: Camino Records
- Producer: Steve Hackett and Billy Budis

Steve Hackett chronology
Momentum (1988)	Time Lapse (1992)	Guitar Noir (1993)

Alternative cover
- Original cover.

Professional ratings
Review scores
Source	Rating
Allmusic	3/5 stars

Time Lapse is the first live album by guitarist Steve Hackett. The album is drawn from live performances at the Savoy Theatre in New York City (during the Cured tour) and at Central TV Studios in Nottingham. Chas Cronk of the Strawbs plays bass on the songs recorded in New York, as well as future Marillion drummer, Ian Mosley. Video of this performance was also made available in 1992 via Steve Hackett Live, which has been rereleased a number of times in full and abridged forms in the years since.

== Track listing ==
All songs written by Steve Hackett, except where indicated.

1. "Camino Royale" (S. Hackett, Nick Magnus) – 7:33
2. "Please Don't Touch" – 4:24
3. "Every Day" – 6:59
4. "In That Quiet Earth" (Tony Banks, Phil Collins, S. Hackett, Mike Rutherford) – 3:50
5. "Depth Charge" – 3:21
6. "Jacuzzi" – 4:29
7. "The Steppes" – 5:57
8. "Ace of Wands" – 7:36
9. "Hope I Don't Wake" – 4:13
10. "The Red Flower of Tachai Blooms Everywhere" – 2:44
11. "Tigermoth" – 3:22
12. "A Tower Struck Down" (S. Hackett, John Hackett) – 2:58
13. "Spectral Mornings" – 5:19
14. "Clocks" – 4:52

== Personnel ==
- Steve Hackett – guitar, vocals
- John Hackett – flute, guitar, bass pedals

Nottingham

- Ian Ellis – bass, vocals
- Julian Colbeck – keyboards, vocals
- Fudge Smith – drums

New York City

- Chas Cronk – bass, vocals
- Nick Magnus – keyboards
- Ian Mosley – drums

Tracks 1–5, 13–14 recorded at Central TV Studios, Nottingham, October 1990

Tracks 6–12 recorded at the Savoy Theatre, New York, November 1981
