= Twiddly bits =

English idiom

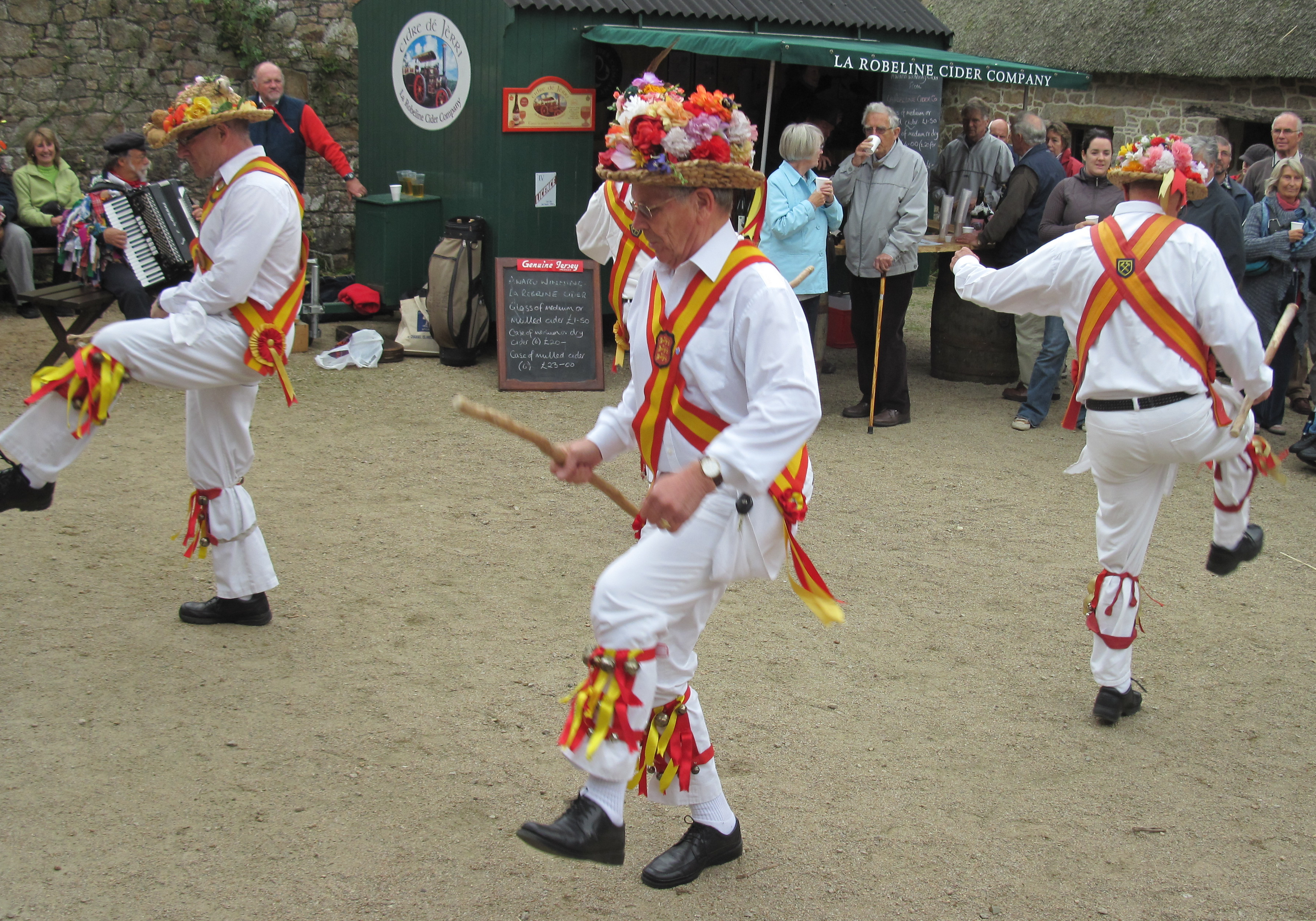
The decorations on the costume of a morris dancer may be described as twiddly bits

Twiddly Bits is an English slang term. From the word twiddly (sometimes spelled Twiddley); curly or decorative, esp. in an unnecessary way and bit; a small piece or amount of something, a twiddly bit is anything that is relatively small and trifling or elaborately decorative.

Twiddly is a commonly used word in British English, as in Roald Dahl’s The BFG, where the giant’s large ears allow him to hear absolutely every single twiddly little thing. The term twiddly bit is applicable in almost any context and is commonly used to describe aspects of architecture, art, music, literature, fashion, etc.

== Music ==
The term "Twiddly Bits" is commonly used in the music industry to describe a short improvised part that is technically advanced and/or musically interesting. In music, a Twiddly Bit is similar to a solo though it is typically shorter and lacks the structure typical of a solo, that is to say a beginning, middle and end. Rather it is short and sweet and can serve to fill space, act as a turnaround between parts, or as a substitute for a solo where a musician wants to show off but time does not allow for a full solo.

There is also a Victorian era parlour song called "Twiddley Bits" recorded by Sheila Steafel on the album Victoria Plums. It is about a woman taking music lessons.

== MIDI Library ==
Twiddly.Bits is a brand of MIDI phrases developed in 1993 by Keyfax, a company co-founded by keyboardist Julian Colbeck and Dave Spiers; the name suggested by fellow British prog rock keyboardist, Dave Stewart.

Twiddly.Bits MIDI phrases derive their name from the slang, as they are literally short, 1-to-2-measure, technically advanced performances from professional studio musicians recorded as MIDI. The Twiddly.Bits MIDI library brand was originally conceived to make available to musicians and composers musical MIDI loops that could not be played on a standard MIDI keyboard controller due to the limitations of keyboards in duplicating instrument-specific nuances and timbres, such as a trill from a saxophone or a dynamic drum roll. The parts were recorded using the appropriate MIDI controller so these nuances and characteristics specific to the particular instrument in question would come through, making them the most authentic and realistic-sounding MIDI phrases available. They were the first of the MIDI loop brands and are offered in over 20 different volumes in different genres and musical styles. They are also a well recognised brand and have been used in thousands of commercial recordings and scores since their inception.
