= Symbiosis (musical ensemble) =

British musical ensemble

Symbiosis is a British musical ensemble which creates relaxing, ambient music.

== Formation and lineup ==
Symbiosis was first formed in 1987 and consisted of a trio with: flautist, John Hackett; guitarist and cellist, Richard Bolton; and singer, flautist, keyboard player and percussionist, Clive Williamson. Other musicians who have played on albums by Symbiosis include: Ian Ritchie (soprano sax); Ashley Drees (cittern and mandolin); Michèle Drees (percussion); Sarah Devonald (oboe & cor anglais); Rupert Flindt (fretless bass); Maloviere (tsimbala and violin); Nicki Paxman (violin and keyboards); and Emily Jane Sinclair (flute and vocals).

== Purpose of music and use of natural sounds ==
Symbiosis' music is used mainly by individuals, therapists and their clients, hospitals, and businesses as a means of relaxation. Symbiosis' music is free-flowing and melodic, as to not disturb deep relaxation of the listener. The group is best known for its album Touching the Clouds (1992).

In 1995–1996, the group's founder-member Clive Williamson travelled to New Zealand to make digital recordings of its unique natural sounds, which were released by Symbiosis in 1997 (in both NZ and the UK) as 'AOTEAROA - Nature Sounds of New Zealand'. The album included birdsong from endemic species including the tui, korimako (New Zealand bellbird) and the endangered tieke (saddleback) and hihi (stitchbird), some of which was recorded on the offshore natural reserves of Kapiti Island and Tiritiri Matangi Island. The album was extended in 2017 and remastered and reissued with new recordings (including the rare kokako) in 2018 under the title: 'New Zealand Naturally'.

In 2021, the group increased its interest in using natural sounds to reduce stress and increase wellbeing, releasing At Peace with Nature - Relaxing Sounds for Mindful Moments. Sound designer and musician Clive Williamson drew on his experience as a producer and studio manager with the BBC to create a series of 'virtual nature walks' in sound. The recordings were made over 25 years in four different countries, with locations including Devon's coast, Dartmoor and Kew in the United Kingdom; the Australian bush; nature reserves, Lake Rotoiti and Rotorua in New Zealand; and the Llanos and Amazon regions of Colombia.

== Discography ==
- 1988 - Tears of the Moon (CD release 2001)
- 1988 - Song of the Peach Tree Spring (CD release 1998)
- 1992 - Touching the Clouds
- 1992 - Atmospheres (Deleted)
- 1992 - The Inner Voice (Deleted)
- 1994 - Lake of Dreams
- 1995 - Autumn Days
- 1995 - Angels! Angels! Angels! with author and lecturer Denise Linn
- 1996 - Phoenix Rising with author and lecturer Denise Linn
- 1996 - Amber & Jade
- 1997 - AOTEAROA - Nature Sounds of New Zealand
- 1997 - Dreams with author and lecturer Denise Linn
- 1998 - Instinctive Feng Shui for Creating Sacred Space (video, with Denise Linn)
- 1999 - Sea of Light
- 2002 - The Comfort Zone (Compilation)
- 2002 - Secrets & Mysteries - the Glory and Pleasure of being a Woman with Denise Linn
- 2005 - Dancing in your Dreams (Compilation)
- 2017 - Air & Grace with flautist John Hackett (Compilation)
- 2017 - AOTEAROA - Nature Sounds of New Zealand (Extended Edition)
- 2018 - Flowing with the Tide with Clive Williamson
- 2018 - New Zealand Naturally by Clive Williamson & Symbiosis
- 2019 - Songs of Hope - The Dawn Chorus, Tiritiri Matangi Island, New Zealand by Clive Williamson & Symbiosis
- 2021 - At Peace with Nature - Relaxing Sounds for Mindful Moments by Clive Williamson & Symbiosis
