= Guitar Noir =

Studio album by Steve Hackett
- Released: 17 May 1993
- Recorded: 1991–93
- Genre: Progressive rock
- Length: 57:34
- Label: Permanent Records (UK); Viceroy Music (US)
- Producer: Steve Hackett

Steve Hackett chronology
| Time Lapse (1992) | Guitar Noir (1993) | Blues with a Feeling (1994) |

Guitar Noir is the tenth album by Steve Hackett, released in 1993. On this record, he started turning to a much darker guitar sound, yet still retaining the fluidity he has become known for.

== Track listing (UK Version) ==
1. "Sierra Quemada" (Steve Hackett) – 5:19
2. "Take These Pearls" (Hackett, Aron Friedman) – 4:14
3. "There Are Many Sides to the Night" (Hackett) – 7:23
4. "In The Heart of the City" (Hackett) – 4:35
5. "Dark As The Grave" (Hackett, Friedman) – 4:38
6. "Lost in Your Eyes" (Hackett, Dave 'Taif' Ball, Julian Colbeck, Hugo Degenhardt) – 4:56
7. "Little America" (Hackett, Ball, Colbeck, Degenhardt) – 4:55
8. "Like An Arrow" (Hackett) – 2:51
9. "Theatre of Sleep" (Hackett) – 3:04
10. "Walking Away From Rainbows" (Hackett) – 3:10
11. "Paint Your Picture" (Hackett) – 2:58
12. "Vampyre with a Healthy Appetite" (Hackett) – 5:30
13. "Tristesse" (Friedman) – 4:02
- 1997 remastered bonus tracks
1. "Sierra Quemada" (demo) (Hackett) – 4:31
2. "Take These Pearls" (rough mix) (Hackett, Friedman) – 4:11
3. "In The Heart of the City" (original version) (Hackett) – 4:19
4. "Vampyre with a Healthy Appetite" (demo) (Hackett) – 4:41

The original (1993) version of the CD did not include the track "Theatre of Sleep".

== Track listing (US Version) ==
1. "Lost in Your Eyes" (Hackett, Ball, Colbeck, Degenhardt) – 4:56
2. "In The Heart of the City" (Hackett) – 4:35
3. "Sierra Quemada" (Hackett) – 5:19
4. "Vampyre with a Healthy Appetite" (Hackett) – 5:30
5. "Take These Pearls" (Hackett, Friedman) – 4:14
6. "Little America" (Hackett, Dave 'Taif' Ball, Colbeck, Degenhardt) – 4:55
7. "There Are Many Sides to the Night" (Hackett) – 6:55
8. "Walking Away From Rainbows" (Hackett) – 3:10
9. "Like An Arrow" (Hackett) – 2:51
10. "Dark As The Grave" (Hackett, Friedman) – 4:38
11. "Paint Your Picture" (Hackett) – 2:58
12. "Tristesse" (Friedman) – 4:02
13. Cassandra (Hackett) – 3:42 (unlisted song featuring Brian May of Queen recorded in 1986)

== Personnel (on UK Version) ==
- Steve Hackett – guitars, vocals (2–9, 11, 12), stepp (3, 10, 11), noises off (3), harmonica (6, 7, 12), string arrangements (8), rainstick (11)
- Julian Colbeck – keyboards (1, 4, 6, 7, 12), backing vocals (7)
- Dave "Taif" Ball – bass (1, 4, 6, 7, 12)
- Hugo Degenhardt – drums (1, 4, 6, 7, 12)
- Aron Friedman – keyboards (2, 5, 8, 13), programming (2, 5, 8, 13), string arrangements (8)
- Nick Magnus – keyboards (9), programming (9)
- Bimbo Acock – clarinet (9)
- Billy Budis – backing vocals (11)
