= Blues with a Feeling (Steve Hackett album) =

Blues With A Feeling

Studio album by Steve Hackett
- Released: 10 October 1994
- Genre: Blues
- Length: 46:30
- Label: Permanent Records (UK); Herald (US); Camino Records (1998 re-issue)
- Producer: Steve Hackett

Steve Hackett chronology
| Guitar Noir (1993) | Blues With A Feeling (1994) | Watcher of the Skies: Genesis Revisited (1996) |

Professional ratings
Review scores
| Source | Rating |
|---|---|
| AllMusic | 2/5 stars |

Blues with a Feeling is the 11th studio album by Steve Hackett, released in 1994. As the title denotes, Hackett explored his feelings about blues music.

== Track listing (UK version) ==
1. "Born in Chicago" (Nick Gravenites) – 3:58
2. "The Stumble" (Freddie King, Sonny Thompson) – 2:55
3. "Love of Another Kind" – 4:00
4. "Way Down South" – 4:29
5. "A Blue Part of Town" – 3:04
6. "Footloose" – 2:30
7. "Tombstone Roller" – 5:18
8. "Blues with a Feeling" (Little Walter Jacobs) – 4:23
9. "Big Dallas Sky" – 4:48
10. "The 13th Floor" – 3:29
11. "So Many Roads" (Marshall Paul) – 3:16
12. "Solid Ground" – 4:28

On June 24, 2016, Esoteric Recordings (a Cherry Red Records label) released a remastered version of the album, adding two new bonus tracks that were recorded specifically for this release: "On Cemetery Road" (3:07), and "Patch of Blue" (4:37).

== Personnel ==
- Steve Hackett - guitars, harmonica, vocals
- Doug Sinclair - bass
- Julian Colbeck - keyboards
- Hugo Degenhardt - drums

Guests musicians

- Dave "Taif" Ball - bass on "Love of Another Kind" and "Way Down South"
- Jerry Peal - organ on "Love of Another Kind"
- John Chapman - baritone saxophone on "Footloose", "Tombstone Roller" and "Blues with a Feeling"
- Pete Long - tenor saxophone on "Footloose", "Tombstone Roller" and "Blues with a Feeling"
- John Lee, Matt Dunkley - trumpet on "Footloose", "Tombstone Roller" and "Blues with a Feeling"

== Production ==
- Recorded by : Chris Deam, Gerry O'Riordan, Jerry Peal
- Mixed by : Jerry Peal
- Producer : Steve Hackett
