= Vitamin Z =

British band

- Origin: Sheffield, England
- Genres: New wave, synthpop
- Years active: 1982–1991
- Labels: Phonogram, Mercury, Geffen
- Past members: Geoff Barradale; Nick Lockwood; David Rhodes

Vitamin Z were an English band, formed in 1982 by vocalist Geoff Barradale and bassist Nick Lockwood. Their biggest hit "Burning Flame" charted in the UK and US, but their one other hit in the UK, "Every Time That I See You", did not chart in the US. Geoff Barradale now serves as manager for the Arctic Monkeys.

== History ==
The band's debut album Rites of Passage was released in 1985. Its most prominent single, "Burning Flame", produced by Chris Hughes, hit number 73 on the Billboard Hot 100 and No. 27 on the Billboard Dance Club Songs chart.

Geoff Barradale appeared on the Alan Parsons Project album Gaudi, released in 1987. He sang lead vocals on its lead single, "Standing on Higher Ground".

Barradale is the manager for the Arctic Monkeys, who are also from Sheffield.

== Discography ==
=== Albums ===
- 1985: Rites of Passage (Geffen Records) - US No. 183
- 1989: Sharp Stone Rain (Geffen Records)

=== Singles ===
- 1984: "Burning Flame" (7", 12") - UK No. 80, US No. 73
- 1985: "Circus Ring (We Scream About)" (7", 12")
- 1985: "Every Time That I See You" (7", 12") - UK No. 78
- 1985: "Hi Hi Friend" (7", 12")
- 1989: "Burn for You" (7", 12", CD single)
- 1990: "Can't Live Without You" (7", 12", CD single)
