= Feedback 86 =

Studio album by Steve Hackett
- Released: 9 October 2000
- Recorded: 1986
- Genre: Pop rock
- Label: Camino Records
- Producer: Steve Hackett

Steve Hackett chronology
Sketches of Satie (2000)	Feedback 86 (2000)	Live Archive 70, 80, 90's (2001)

Professional ratings
Review scores
Source	Rating
Allmusic	1.5/5 stars

Feedback 86 is the 15th studio album by guitarist Steve Hackett. The album is a collection of songs written in 1986 but were shelved until this release. Some of the songs were intended for the cancelled second GTR album. The album features guest appearances by singer Bonnie Tyler, Queen guitarist Brian May, Manfred Mann's Earth Band vocalist Chris Thompson, and Marillion members Ian Mosley and Pete Trewavas.

== Track listing ==
All songs composed by Steve Hackett, with additional writers noted.

1. "Cassandra" – 4:07 – lead vocal: Chris Thompson
2. "Prizefighters" (Steve Howe) – 5:13 – lead vocals: Bonnie Tyler & Chris Thompson
3. "Slot Machine" (Brian May) – 4:23 – lead vocal: Chris Thompson & Brian May
4. "Stadiums of the Damned" – 4:42 – lead vocal: Steve Hackett
5. "Don't Fall" – 4:25 – lead vocal: Chris Thompson
6. "Oh How I Love You" – 3:58 – lead vocal: Chris Thompson
7. "Notre Dame des Fleurs" – 3:11 – instrumental
8. "The Gulf" – 7:21 – lead vocal: Steve Hackett

== Personnel ==
- Steve Hackett – guitar, vocals (1–5, 8), harmonica (5)
- Brian May – guitar (1, 3), vocals (3)
- Pete Trewavas – bass (1)
- Nick Magnus – keyboards (1–5, 8), virtual drums (2–5, 8), piano (6)
- Ian Mosley – drums (1)
- Bonnie Tyler – vocals (2)
- Chris Thompson – vocals (1–3, 5, 6)
- Terry Pack – bass (2)
- The Phil Henderson Orchestra (2)
