= Live Archive Series =

The Live Archive is a series of live recordings from Steve Hackett. There are six CD releases since 2001 and have become a popular collection for fans.

== 2001: Live Archive 70s 80s 90s ==
Professional ratings
Review scores
Source	Rating
The Courier-Journal	4/5 stars

Disc 1: 70s (Hammersmith Odeon, London 30/06/1979)

1. "Intro" – 2:00
2. "Please Don't Touch" – 5:46
3. "Tigermoth" – 3:37
4. "Every Day" – 7:29
5. "Narnia" – 4:36
6. "The Red Flower of Tai Chi" – 4:03
7. "Ace of Wands" – 7:23
8. "Carry On Up the Vicarage" – 3:33
9. "Etude in A min" – 0:37
10. "Blood on the Rooftops" – 0:18
11. "Horizons" – 1:58
12. "Kim" – 2:36
13. "The Optigan" – 1:29
14. "A Tower Struck Down" – 3:30
15. "Spectral Mornings" – 6:57

Disc 2: 70s (Hammersmith Odeon, London 30/06/1979)

1. "Introductions" – 1:07
2. "Star of Sirius" – 10:16
3. "Shadow of the Hierophant" – 9:35
4. "Clocks" – 7:18
5. "I Know What I Like" – 8:50
6. "Wardrobe Boogie" – 5:02
7. "Racing in A" – 12:15
8. "Racing in A Coda" – 2:07

Disc 3: 80s (Castel Sant' Angelo, Rome 13/09/1981)

1. "The Air Conditioned Nightmare" – 5:00
2. "Jacuzzi" – 5:04
3. "Funny Feeling" – 5:07
4. "Ace of Wands" – 7:47
5. "Picture Postcard" – 5:18
6. "The Steppes" – 6:50
7. "Every Day" – 6:28
8. "Overnight Sleeper" – 4:28
9. "Hope I Don't Wake" – 4:25
10. "Slogans" – 5:18
11. "A Tower Struck Down" – 3:26
12. "Spectral Mornings" – 5:39
13. "The Show" – 3:52
14. "Clocks" – 6:08

Disc 4: 90s (The Grand Theatre, London 08/06/1993)

1. "Medley: Myopia, Los Endos, Imagining, Ace of Wands, Hackett to Pieces" – 4:56
2. "Vampyre with a Healthy Appetite" – 6:13
3. "Sierra Quemada" – 4:20
4. "Take These Pearls" – 4:56
5. "In the Heart of the City" – 5:32
6. "Walking Away from Rainbows" – 3:38
7. "There Are Many Sides to the Night" – 5:20
8. "Kim" – 2:25
9. "Dark as the Grave" – 5:26
10. "Always Somewhere Else" – 6:17
11. "Lost in Your Eyes" – 5:02
12. "Spectral Mornings/Firth of Fifth/Clocks" – 8:13
13. "Cinema Paradiso" – 3:16
14. "...In That Quiet Earth" – 5:20

== 2001: Live Archive 70s : Newcastle ==
(City Hall, Newcastle 26/10/1979) (exclusive to Camino Records for a limited time as Disc 5 of the Live Archive 70s 80s 90s)

1. "Please Don't Touch" – 7:53
2. "Tigermoth" – 3:41
3. "Every Day" – 7:26
4. "The Steppes" – 5:52
5. "Narnia" – 4:10
6. "Red Flower of Taichi Blooms Everywhere" – 3:02
7. "Sentimental Institution" – 2:38
8. "Star of Sirius" – 9:39
9. "Spectral Mornings" – 6:42
10. "Clocks" – 5:29
11. "Ace of Wands" – 5:05
12. "Hands of the Priestess" – 6:04
13. "Racing in A" – 7:51

The last three tracks were recorded at Hammersmith Odeon, London 30/10/78.

== 2003: Live Archive NEARfest ==
Recorded at Patriots Theater, Trenton, New Jersey 30/06/2002.

Disc 1

1. "The Floating Seventh" – 1:44
2. "Mechanical Bride" – 6:33
3. "Medley" – 5:11
4. "Serpentine Song" – 6:54
5. "Watcher of the Skies" – 5:18
6. "Hairless Heart" – 2:58
7. "Firth of Fifth" – 3:23
8. "Riding the Colossus" – 4:25
9. "Pollution B" – 2:24
10. "The Steppes" – 6:17
11. "Gnossienne no. 1" – 3:38
12. "Walking Away from Rainbows" – 3:53
13. "In Memoriam" – 7:19
14. "The Wall of Knives" – 0:47
15. "Vampyre with a Healthy Appetite" – 5:34

Disc 2

1. "Spectral Mornings" – 7:29
2. "Lucridus" – 0:54
3. "Darktown" – 5:12
4. "Camino Royale" – 8:30
5. "Every Day" – 7:09
6. "Horizons" – 2:02
7. "Los Endos" – 6:07

== 2004: Live Archive 03 ==
Compiled from Hackett's 2003 To Watch the Storms European Tour.

Disc 1

1. "Mechanical Bride" – 6:45
2. "Serpentine Song" – 6:40
3. "Watcher of the Skies" – 5:30
4. "Hairless Heart" – 2:42
5. "Darktown" – 4:47
6. "Camino Royale" – 7:52
7. "Pollution B" – 1:58
8. "The Steppes" – 5:42
9. "Acoustic Medley" – 4:00
10. "Kim" – 2:42
11. "Walking Away from Rainbows" – 4:10

Disc 2

1. "Slogans" – 4:03
2. "Every Day" – 6:37
3. "Please Don't Touch" – 4:25
4. "Firth of Fifth" – 3:07
5. "The Wall of Knives" – 0:31
6. "Vampyre with a Healthy Appetite" – 5:53
7. "Spectral Mornings" – 5:48
8. "Brand New" – 5:02
9. "Los Endos" – 6:47
10. "Clocks" – 4:29
11. "In That Quiet Earth" – 6:07

== 2004: Live Archive 04 ==
Recorded at Petofi Csarnok, Budapest, Hungary 03/04/2004.

Disc 1

1. "Intro" – 1:05
2. "Valley of the Kings" – 5:37
3. "Mechanical Bride" – 6:59
4. "Circus of Becoming" – 3:09
5. "Frozen Statues" – 3:48
6. "Slogans" – 4:02
7. "Serpentine Song" – 7:13
8. "Ace of Wands" – 6:35
9. "Hammer in the Sand" – 4:02
10. "Blood on the Rooftops" – 5:55
11. "Fly on a Windshield" – 3:04
12. "Please Don't Touch" – 3:57
13. "Firth of Fifth" – 4:03

Disc 2

1. "If You Can't Find Heaven" – 3:27
2. "Darktown" – 5:33
3. "Brand New" – 5:49
4. "Air-Conditioned Nightmare" – 4:08
5. "Every Day" – 6:30
6. "Clocks" – 5:46
7. "Spectral Mornings" – 5:46
8. "Los Endos" – 8:16

== 2005: Live Archive 05 ==
Recorded during Steve's Acoustic Trio Tour in April 2005 to promote his recent studio outing Metamorpheus.

Disc 1

1. "Intro" – 0:18
2. "Japonica" – 5:12
3. "Andante in C" – 4:11
4. "Tribute to Segovia" – 3:51
5. "Metamorpheus excerpts" – 1:49
6. "Bay of Kings" – 5:49
7. "Classical Jazz" – 3:43
8. "Sapphires" – 1:34
9. "Mexico City" – 1:48
10. "Black Light" – 4:56
11. "Skye Boat Song" – 1:07
12. "Pease Blossom" – 3:43
13. "Horizons" – 2:48

Disc 2

1. "Intros" – 1:24
2. "Jacuzzi" – 4:21
3. "Bacchus" – 2:15
4. "Firth of Fifth (excerpt)" – 2:33
5. "Improv" – 3:02
6. "The Red Flower of Tai Chi Blooms Everywhere" – 2:16
7. "Hands of the Priestess" – 8:13
8. "After the Ordeal" – 2:08
9. "Hairless Heart" – 3:46
10. "M3" – 2:49
11. "Imagining" – 1:19
12. "Second Chance" – 4:09
13. "Jazz on a Summer's Night" – 3:29
14. "Next Time Around" – 4:36
15. "Kim" – 3:47
16. "Avant Dernière Pensées" – 3:46
17. "The Journey" – 4:05
18. "Ace of Wands" – 4:29
19. "Walking Away from Rainbows" – 4:13
20. "Gnossiennes Nº. 1" – 4:46

== 2006: Live Archive 83 ==
Recorded at Edinburgh's Queens Hall on 04/11/1983.

1. "Calmaria"
2. "Hands of the Priestess"
3. "Jacuzzi"
4. "The Barren Land"
5. "Tales of the Riverbank"
6. "Second Chance"
7. "Oriental Improvisation"
8. "Petropolis"
9. "Kim"
10. "The Water Wheel"
11. "Concert for Munich"
12. "The Journey"
13. "Ace of Wands"
14. "A Cradle of Swans"
15. "Jazz on a Summer's Night"
16. "Horizons"
17. "Time Lapse at Milton Keynes"
18. "Bay of Kings"
