= Steve Hackett =

English guitarist (born 1950)

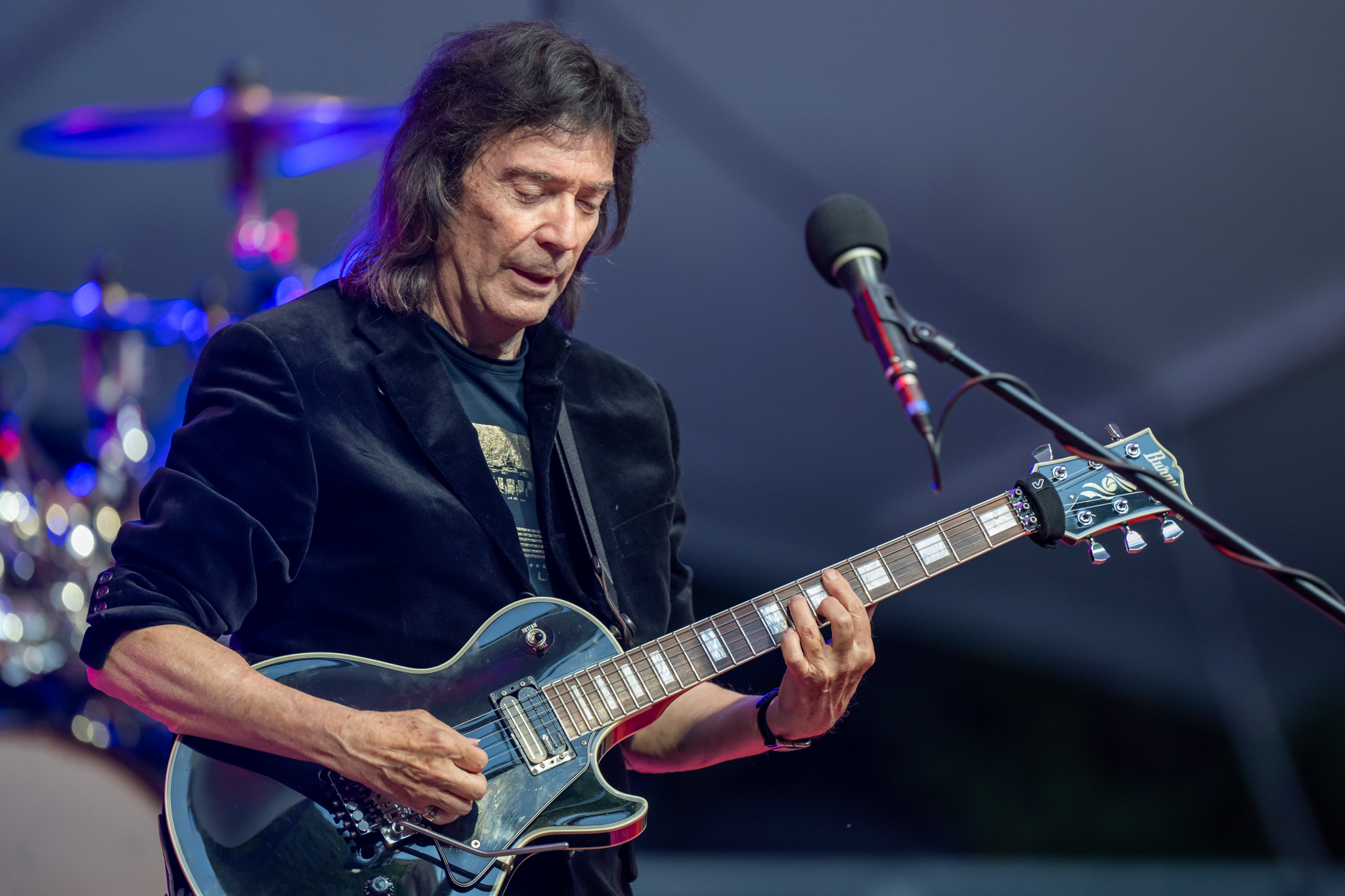
- Hackett in 2024

Background information
- Born: Stephen Richard Hackett; 12 February 1950 (age 76); London, England
- Genres: Progressive rock; blues; classical music; worldbeat; pop rock
- Occupations: Musician; songwriter; record producer
- Instruments: Guitar; vocals
- Years active: 1968–present
- Labels: Charisma; Camino; Chrysalis (US); Epic (US); Gramy; Lamborghini; Start; Wolfwork; Blue Plate/Caroline (US); Inside Out Music
- Formerly of: Canterbury Glass; Quiet World; Genesis; GTR; Squackett
- Members: List
- Website: hackettsongs.com
- Relatives: John Hackett (brother)

Stephen Richard Hackett (born 12 February 1950) is an English guitarist who gained prominence as the lead guitarist of the progressive rock band Genesis from 1971 to 1977. Hackett contributed to six Genesis studio albums, three live albums, seven singles and one EP before he left to pursue a solo career. He was inducted into the Rock and Roll Hall of Fame as a member of Genesis in 2010.

Hackett released his first solo album, Voyage of the Acolyte, while still a member of Genesis in 1975. After a series of further solo albums beginning in 1978, Hackett co-founded the supergroup GTR with Steve Howe in 1986. The group released the self-titled album GTR, which peaked at No. 11 on the Billboard 200 in the United States and spawned the Top 20 single "When the Heart Rules the Mind". When Hackett left GTR in 1987, the group disbanded. Hackett then resumed his solo career. He has released albums and toured worldwide on a regular basis since.

Hackett's body of work encompasses many styles; in addition to his work in progressive rock, he has explored pop, blues, world music and classical music on his solo recordings. According to Guitar World: "Hackett's early explorations of two-handed tapping and sweep picking were far ahead of their time, and influenced Eddie Van Halen and Brian May." Other guitarists influenced by Hackett include Alex Lifeson and Steve Rothery.

== Early life ==
Stephen Richard Hackett was born on 12 February 1950 in Pimlico, central London to Peter and June Hackett. He was born one day before his future Genesis bandmate, singer Peter Gabriel. He has a younger brother John who took up the flute and has performed, collaborated and written with Hackett throughout his solo career, and helped compose some of the early Genesis songs uncredited including "Get 'Em Out by Friday" and "Cuckoo Cocoon". Hackett attended Sloane Grammar School in Chelsea. In the 1950s, the family relocated to Vancouver, Canada but returned home after his parents, his mother in particular, became too homesick.

Hackett grew up having access to various musical instruments, such as the harmonica and recorder, but he did not develop an interest in the guitar until the age of 12 when he started playing single notes. By 14, he was learning chords and experimenting with chord progressions, although he never received any formal training.

Hackett's earliest musical influences were classical (Johann Sebastian Bach) and opera (Mario Lanza). He has said that his compositions are still influenced by them. Hackett also has cited numerous British blues artists as influences, namely Danny Kirwan, Peter Green and various guitarists in John Mayall & the Bluesbreakers, as well as Jimi Hendrix, the Beatles and King Crimson.

== Career ==
=== 1968–1970: Early bands ===
Hackett's first professional playing experience came as a member of three rock bands: Canterbury Glass, with whom he played on "Prologue" on their album Sacred Scenes and Characters which was recorded in 1968 but distributed in 2007; Heel Pier; and Sarabande, all of whom performed rock with progressive rock elements. He then joined Quiet World in 1970 which featured his brother John on flute. He did not write any material with the group as the band's founders directed what the other members played, which did not bother Hackett as he wished to get more experience in a recording studio since the band had secured a contract with a label. Hackett played on the band's only studio album, The Road (1970), released on Dawn Records, and left them soon after.

=== 1970–1977: Genesis ===
In December 1970, Hackett placed an advertisement in Melody Maker in his search for a new band. It read: "Imaginative guitarist-writer seeks involvement with receptive musicians, determined to strive beyond existing stagnant music forms". In a 2021 interview, Hackett explained that, by 'stagnant', he meant a lack of inclusion among the different music genres in the 1970s. The ad was responded to by Genesis lead vocalist Peter Gabriel. Genesis, which also comprised keyboardist Tony Banks, bassist/guitarist Mike Rutherford and drummer Phil Collins, had lost founding guitarist Anthony Phillips and sought a new, permanent replacement to his temporary replacement Mick Barnard. Gabriel advised Hackett to listen to their last album Trespass (1970) before Hackett auditioned for the group. The audition was conducted by just Banks and Gabriel, since Rutherford was ill in bed. Rutherford later confessed that the reason Genesis had been having such a hard time finding a guitarist was that he was intent on finding someone with the same style and personality as Phillips and, had he not been unwell that day, Hackett would probably not have passed the audition. Rutherford and Hackett soon developed a close bond and rapport over inversion chords and unique guitar tunings.

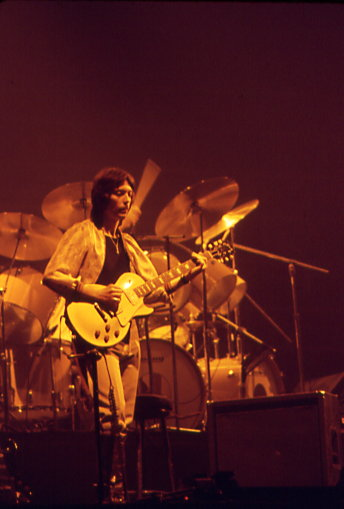
Hackett on stage with Genesis, 1977

Hackett's first live performance with Genesis took place at City University, London on 14 January 1971. Hackett's first recording with Genesis was Nursery Cryme (1971). His guitar work is prominently featured through solos on "The Musical Box", "The Return of the Giant Hogweed" and "The Fountain of Salmacis", and despite the fact that much of the material had been written by the time he joined Genesis, he made considerable contributions to the songwriting. He wrote the solo on "The Fountain of Salmacis" rather than improvising. Other significant songwriting contributions to Nursery Cryme included half the lyrics and all of the music to "For Absent Friends", and the pre-chorus of "Seven Stones". He became an early proponent of the guitar tapping technique normally attributed to Eddie Van Halen. Hackett claimed that Van Halen learned the technique after attending a Genesis concert in the mid-1970s.

Foxtrot (1972) includes Hackett's guitar solo composition "Horizons", which he based on a Suite for Cello by Bach. On the first day of recording Foxtrot, Hackett offered to leave Genesis because he felt he was not contributing enough to their work and would soon be kicked out of the band anyway, but Rutherford and Banks said they liked his playing and wanted him to stay. Hackett called this a pivotal moment which largely dispelled the insecurity he felt during his early days with the band. Selling England by the Pound (1973) features Hackett using tapping and sweep picking, later popularised by Yngwie Malmsteen, both of which are used on "Dancing with the Moonlit Knight". The song "Firth of Fifth" contains one of Hackett's most well-known guitar solos and remained a favourite in concert even after Hackett's departure. The solo was in fact composed by Banks, but Gabriel, Collins, and Banks himself have all said that Hackett effectively made it his own with his interpretation. Gabriel said that Selling England by the Pound "was [Hackett's] coming-of-age album in a lot of ways."

The writing sessions for The Lamb Lies Down on Broadway (1974) was a difficult time for the entire group, partly due to the personal lives of some members which affected the mood. Hackett explained: "Everybody had their own agenda. Some of us were married, some of us had children, some of us were getting divorced. And we were still trying to get it together in the country". By "some of us were getting divorced", Hackett was coyly referring to his divorce from his first wife; none of the other members were going through divorces. According to Banks, Hackett was not very involved in the songwriting for The Lamb Lies Down on Broadway, though he did write the vocal melody for "Cuckoo Cocoon" and the lead melody for "Hairless Heart", and co-wrote the music to "It" with Banks. Hackett picked out "The Lamia" and "Fly on a Windshield" as his favourite moments on the album.

Hackett has the distinction of being the only member of Genesis during his tenure who did not sing. Hackett explained, "I was too shy to sing in those days; I thought I would sing out of tune."

After recording his debut album Voyage of the Acolyte, Hackett resumed working in Genesis, who recorded A Trick of the Tail (1976), the band's first after Gabriel left the band. At this point Banks felt that the practice of crediting all Genesis songs as written by all the members no longer accurately reflected the balance within the group, since the bulk of The Lamb Lies Down on Broadway was written by Gabriel and himself, and at his prodding the band switched to using individual writing credits. As a result, Hackett is credited for co-writing only three of the eight songs on A Trick of the Tail: "Dance on a Volcano", "Entangled" and "Los Endos". The follow-up, Wind & Wuthering (1976), is Hackett's final studio album with the band. He had grown increasingly constricted by his lack of freedom and level of input and was insistent that more of his material be included on the album, but was rebuffed. One of his rejected songs, "Please Don't Touch", was adopted for his second solo album, Please Don't Touch!.

Hackett left the band during the mixing stage of the Genesis live album, Seconds Out. His departure was announced in the press during the promotion of the album on 8 October 1977. Hackett has said that he "needed autonomy".

==== Reunions ====
Since Hackett's departure, the 1970–1975 line-up of Genesis has reunited a handful of times. On 2 October 1982, the group gathered for Six of the Best, a one-off performance held to raise money for Gabriel's WOMAD festival. In 1983, Hackett was joined on stage by Gabriel and Rutherford during a series of shows at the Civic Hall in Guildford, the three performing with Hackett's band. The set list included a mix of Genesis songs, covers and tracks from their solo careers.

In 1998, members of Genesis reunited for a photo session and dinner to celebrate the release of the Genesis Archive 1967–75 box set. The release featured Hackett and Gabriel re-recording some guitar and vocal parts, respectively. Hackett also participated in the re-recording of "The Carpet Crawlers" from The Lamb Lies Down on Broadway for inclusion on the 1999 greatest hits album Turn It On Again: The Hits.

In late 2005, the 1970–1975 line-up gathered to discuss the possibility of a reunion and performing The Lamb Lies Down on Broadway. After Gabriel decided against the idea, Hackett opted out of the project. This led to Banks, Rutherford and Collins getting together in 2006 for the Turn It On Again: The Tour. Hackett took part in a series of interviews for the remastering of the band's albums in 2007, and the interview book Genesis: Chapter and Verse released in the same year.

In March 2010, 1970–1975 line-up of Genesis were inducted into the Rock and Roll Hall of Fame by Phish guitarist Trey Anastasio. Hackett appeared at the ceremony with Banks, Rutherford and Collins, though none of them performed.

In 2014, Hackett was featured in the BBC documentary Genesis: Together and Apart which focused on the band and the solo careers of the other members. Hackett expressed his displeasure with it following its broadcast, which he described as a "biased account of Genesis history" which "totally ignores" his solo work. Hackett was included in the compilation album R-Kive containing Genesis material and tracks from each member's solo career. His contributions are "Ace of Wands", "Every Day" and "Nomads".

In 2022, Hackett said he was invited to the final Genesis concert in London on 26 March. However, he was unable to attend due to his tour being rescheduled due to the COVID-19 pandemic.

In September 2025, Hackett joined Gabriel, Banks and Rutherford for a release party for the 50th anniversary remastered version of The Lamb Lies Down on Broadway (Collins, who was recovering from a surgery, was unable to join). The four members gave an interview to Planet Rock about their thoughts on the album and memories of putting it together.

=== 1975–present: Solo career ===
==== 1970s ====
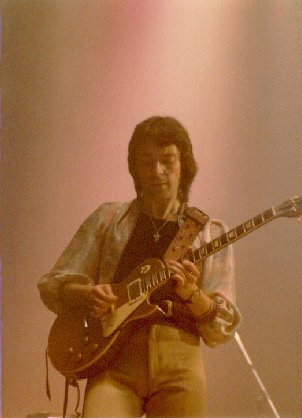
Hackett performing with Genesis in 1977

In October 1975, Hackett released his first solo album, Voyage of the Acolyte. Its original title was Premonitions, but management at Charisma disliked it and suggested Voyage of the Acolyte, to which Hackett agreed. The album features Collins and Rutherford on drums and bass, respectively, and reached No. 26 in the UK and was certified silver. Hackett enjoyed the freedom he had when writing and recording his own album, but was informed by Rutherford and Banks that he could not continue his solo career while in Genesis. Part of one of the album tracks, "Shadow of the Hierophant", was rehearsed by Genesis during the writing and recording of Foxtrot. Upon its release Hackett resumed working in Genesis.

Hackett's first post-Genesis album was Please Don't Touch!, released in 1978. As with Voyage of the Acolyte (1975), much of the material on the album was in the style of progressive rock. It did contain, however, much more vocal work. Hackett, who had never sung lead or backing vocals on a Genesis song, turned over most of the vocals to a number of singers, including folk singer Richie Havens, R&B singer Randy Crawford, and Steve Walsh of American progressive rock group Kansas. He did provide lead vocals for "Carry On Up the Vicarage", but they were processed using a "laughing gnome" vocal effect. The album peaked at no. 38 on the UK chart, and no. 103 on the Billboard pop Albums chart in the United States.

Having released two albums, Hackett was faced with the task of assembling a band to perform the material live. This became a group with John Hackett on flute, bass pedals and guitar, Dik Cadbury on bass and vocals, Nick Magnus on keyboards, John Shearer on drums, and Pete Hicks on lead vocals. The subsequent European tour was Hackett's first as a solo performer. It began at the Chateau Neuf in Oslo, Norway on 4 October 1978 and ended with six shows across the UK, culminating at the Hammersmith Apollo in London on 30 October. Hackett used his band on his next album, Spectral Mornings, recorded in the first two months of 1979 in the Netherlands. The album contains various musical styles, including straightforward and progressive rock, folk, and a wider range of instruments such as a Cantonese koto. It reached No. 22 in the UK and No. 138 in the US. The supporting tour included a spot at the Reading Festival in August 1979. Hackett looked back on this period, and the atmosphere within the group, as a hard working and positive one.

==== 1980s ====
Before Hackett recorded his fourth album Defector, he organised a series of gigs in November 1979, including one in London at the Theatre Royal, Drury Lane, to test out new material. Hackett found the experience of recording Defector as equal to Spectral Mornings and noted the similarity in music between the two albums, though he considered the material on the latter as some of the strongest of his career. Upon its release Defector peaked the UK chart at No. 9, which remains his highest-charting album in the country. In the US, the album went to No. 144. The album's tour saw Hackett perform his first solo dates in the US. The tour left Hackett exhausted, and recuperated in Brazil where he spent three months working on new songs.

Hackett changed musical directions with his fifth album, Cured (1981). It was recorded without his band which he had worked with since 1979, barring contributions from Magnus and John Hackett, and features Hackett handling all the lead vocals. Instead of using a drummer, Magnus used an electronic Linn drum machine. Although it contained tracks in a progressive rock and classical style for which Hackett was known, it also showcased a more pop-oriented approach. Released in August 1981, Cured peaked at No. 15 in the UK and No. 169 in the US. The album's tour marked a line-up change with John Hackett and Magnus joined by Chas Cronk on bass and Ian Mosley on drums. The tour for Cured saw the band perform at the 1981 Reading Festival.

After promoting Cured, Hackett received an invitation to form a new trio with Keith Emerson and Jack Bruce, shortly followed by an offer to replace Paul Jones and become lead in a new West End musical production. He declined both offers, and went ahead with his next studio album, Highly Strung, put out in April 1983. It would be his last release on Charisma, as growing differences over Hackett's direction, plus management resisting to release an acoustic or live album, caused an end to their partnership. Highly Strung went to No. 16 in the UK, and "Cell 151" became a minor hit there.

In 1983, Hackett had secured a deal with Lamborghini Records which supported the release of his seventh album, Bay of Kings, containing classical guitar compositions. The album went to No. 70 in the UK. This was followed, in August 1984, with Hackett returning to rock music in his next release, Till We Have Faces. It demonstrated a merge of his guitar with influences of Brazilian percussion and world music. The album peaked at No. 54 in the UK.

In 1985, Hackett formed the supergroup GTR with veteran Yes and Asia guitarist Steve Howe. The group released a gold-selling album, produced by Yes/Asia keyboardist Geoff Downes. The album included "When the Heart Rules the Mind", which hit number 14 on the Billboard Hot 100, the highest charting US single in Hackett's career. Hackett soon left GTR over financial and management squabbles. Hackett's main reason for ending GTR was the lack of funds to continue the project, and his growing desire to pursue a less mainstream career path. Among them included charity and film work, including a jingle for an airline.

In 1986, Hackett also participated with former Yardbirds members Chris Dreja, Paul Samwell-Smith and Jim McCarty on their Box of Frogs project second album Strange Land together with Jimmy Page, Ian Dury and Graham Parker on tracks, "I Keep Calling", "20/20 Vision" and "Average". In 1987, Hackett contributed to the Genesis orchestral album We Know What We Like: The Music of Genesis, performed by the London Symphony Orchestra with arranger and conductor David Palmer.

After GTR, Hackett returned to the studio and recorded a new solo album, Momentum. The troubles he had faced in GTR led Hackett to rate the album as "a therapeutic, cathartic thing" as he welcomed the return to recording "music without props". Released in March 1988, his tour across Europe to promote the album was met with large and enthusiastic crowds which included gigs in Estonia, Russia, and the Soviet Union.

In late 1989, Hackett was the helm of the charity single "Sailing", a cover of Rod Stewart's 1975 hit released under the name Rock Against Repatriation. It was to raise money and awareness of Asian groups that left the difficult conditions of their home but were refused entry into Western countries. Released as a single in 1990, the song included Brian May, the Moody Blues, Mike Rutherford, Phil Manzanera, and Godley & Creme.

In the 1980s he also made a special appearance on Brazilian singer Ritchie's first album, named Voo de Coração (1983). He is co-author of the song "A Mulher Invisível" (1984), from the 2nd LP of the countryman living in Brazil and also played guitar on the track "Meantime" (a poem by Fernando Pessoa music by Ritchie) on the 4th LP of the artist, Loucura e Mágica (1987).

==== 1990s ====
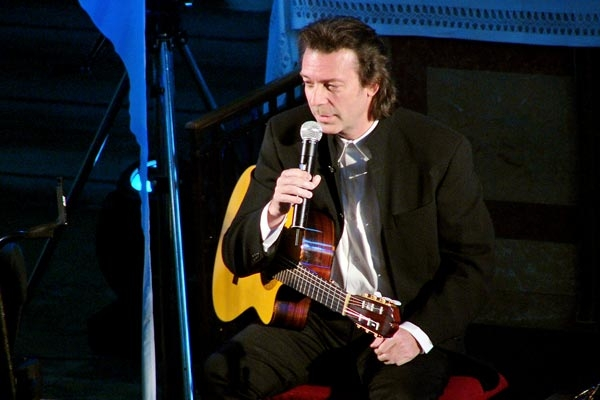
Hackett at the concert in Germany, 2005

In 1992, Hackett resumed touring for the first time in six years, which also saw his return to activity in the US in several years. His reason for the prolonged absence was down to his involvement in various legal issues which prevented him from touring there. Hackett was pleased that his 1992 North American tour was well attended, and used it to test the strength of some new material that he had been working on to an audience, as well as to promote his first live album, Time Lapse. A few months after the release of Time Lapse, Hackett also released a compilation album The Unauthorised Biography, which included two brand new studio tracks, one of which, "Don't Fall Away from Me", was a co-write between Hackett and Brian May of Queen. 1992 also saw Hackett's acoustic performance with the London Chamber Orchestra with a program of Vivaldi. He picked the show as a career highlight.

In May 1993, Hackett released his tenth studio album, Guitar Noir. It includes the track "Walking Away from Rainbows", which lyrically dealt with Hackett's career decision of leaving mainstream music and pursuing what he wishes. Shortly after its release Hackett considered the album "the most crucial thing I've ever done. It's been the thing I've most wanted to do as an album because I've been reduced to silence for so long." Hackett followed this with a blues album, Blues with a Feeling (1994), which included 3 covers in its 12 tracks.

For his next album, Hackett decided to rework a selection of Genesis tracks with various guest musicians. This was released in 1996 as Genesis Revisited, which peaked at No. 95 in the UK. It includes "Déjà Vu", a track Hackett wrote with Peter Gabriel in 1973 during the Selling England by the Pound sessions that had remained unfinished. Hackett promoted the album with two shows in Tokyo in December 1996 with John Wetton, Chester Thompson, Ian McDonald, and Julian Colbeck. The concerts were recorded and filmed, later released as The Tokyo Tapes in 1998.

In April 1997 he released the neo-classical influenced A Midsummer Night's Dream with accompaniments from the Royal Philharmonic Orchestra. It reached the top 10 UK classical chart. This marked the beginning of keyboardist, arranger, and producer Roger King taking a more prominent role on Hackett's future albums and live shows. In 1999, Hackett released his fourteenth studio album, Darktown. The album is named after a book, and the music and lyrical ideas took eight years to finalise. Hackett looked back on the album as one with lyrical themes that he had not been "brave enough" to present before. It went to No. 156 in the UK.

==== 2000s ====
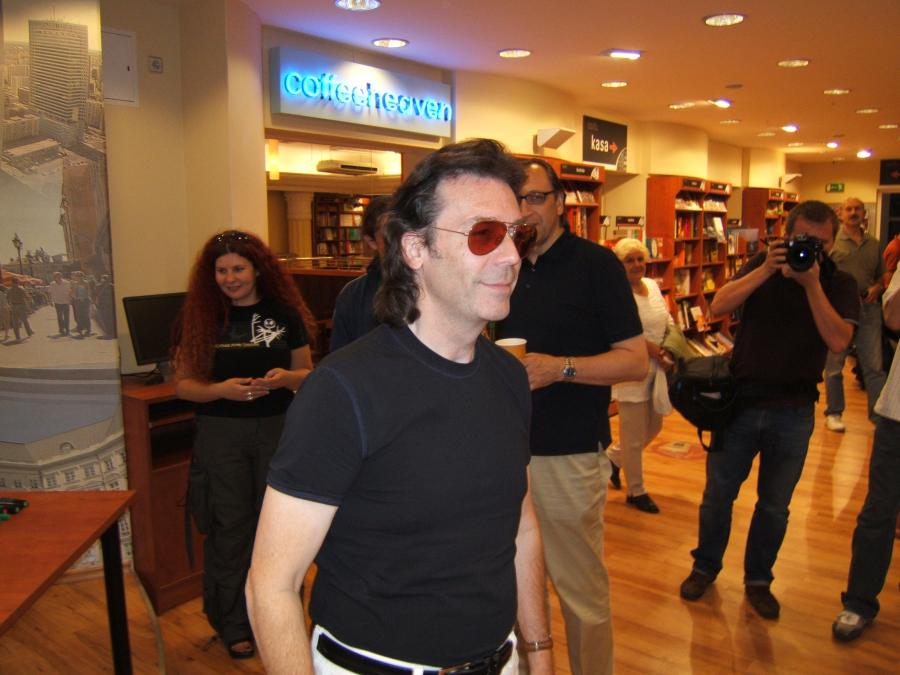
Steve Hackett in Warsaw (2006)

In 2000, Hackett and his brother John released Sketches of Satie, a tribute album to the French composer Erik Satie with the compositions rearranged for flute and guitar. Hackett said that he had not worked on a project with John for some time and had missed playing with him, leading to his manager Billy Budis to suggest an album of Satie's music. Later in 2000, an album of Hackett's with material originally put together in 1986 but put on the shelf, was released as Feedback 86. A portion of the material was for a second GTR album, and features appearances by Brian May.

In 2001, Hackett contributed instrumental music to the score of Outwitting Hitler, a documentary about a Holocaust survivor. It was his first venture into soundtrack work, and had one weekend to finish it. He used themes that he had previously released with some originally intended for his future guitar/orchestra album Metamorpheus (2005).

In 2003, Hackett released To Watch the Storms, his first studio album in four years and his first completed in his new recording studio, Crown Studios. It also marked his return to progressive rock music, and unlike his several previous records the material was put together within three months. His next solo release was the orchestral Metamorpheus (2005) with the Underworld Orchestra, which dates back to 1997 when Hackett recorded his guitar parts for the songs. This was followed by the rock album Wild Orchids (2006), followed by Tribute (2007), a classical album showcasing original pieces and renditions of those by Bach, Byrd, Barrios, and Andrés Segovia.

The recording of Out of the Tunnel's Mouth (2009), was met with various legal issues, including those instigated by his ex-wife Kim Poor and his former manager Billy Budis regarding its rights and attempt to block its release, to prevent Hackett from playing on records by other artists, and the ownership of Hackett's catalogue on Camino Records. A court decision allowed Hackett to "be back in the record business", and to release Out of the Tunnel's Mouth on his new label Wolfwork Records in October 2009. The album was recorded at Hackett's own flat rather than a professional studio. It features contributions by former Genesis guitarist Anthony Phillips and Yes bassist Chris Squire. Hackett toured the album.

In August 2009, an official, authorised biography, Sketches of Hackett by Alan Hewitt, was released. The first edition hardback includes a bonus DVD with a 90-minute interview.

==== 2010s ====
On 15 March 2010, Genesis was inducted into the Rock and Roll Hall of Fame with Hackett making a rare appearance alongside Collins, Banks and Rutherford at the ceremony, though they did not perform together. Hackett had put on record his willingness to participate in a reunion. A planned reunion of the classic 1970s Genesis line-up fell apart in 2007 when Peter Gabriel expressed reservations, and subsequently Hackett dropped out in deference to the Genesis 'trio' line-up, as opposed to the four-piece.

In 2011, Hackett released his 24th studio album Beyond the Shrouded Horizon (no. 133 in the UK album chart). In 2012 he went on tour to promote the album in the UK. In 2012, Hackett and Chris Squire again collaborated to release the album A Life Within a Day under the name of Squackett.

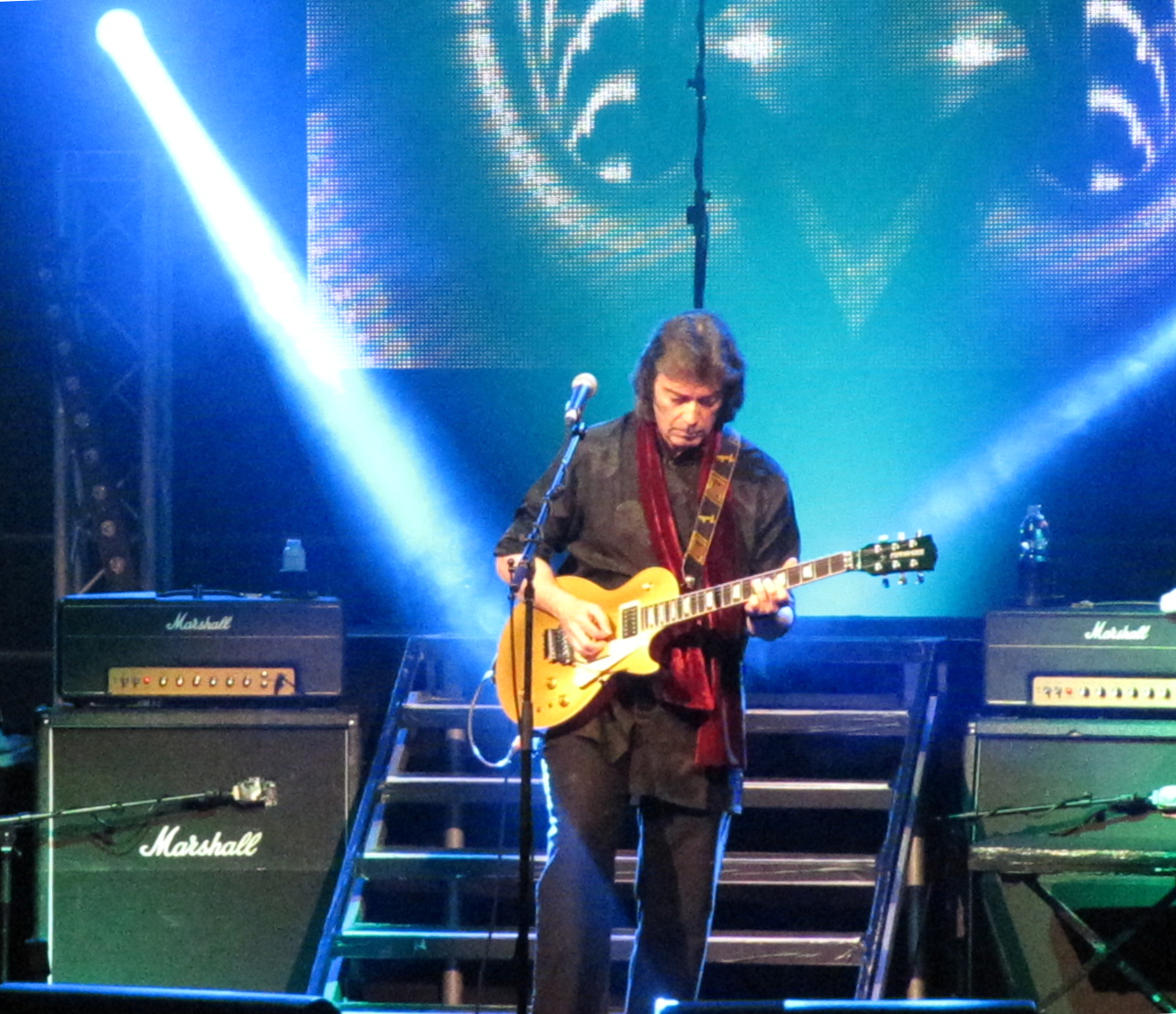
Hackett performing Genesis Revisited in 2013

Hackett released Genesis Revisited II in October 2012. His main reason to revisit the project was the desire to perform the material live once more, and got various musicians to perform the songs which cover material by Genesis and some solo material. Involved was former Genesis lead vocalist Ray Wilson. The album was met with enthusiasm from the public which resulted in Hackett making a stronger chart presence and a sell out supporting tour in the UK. The album reached No. 24 in the UK. In June 2013, both Genesis Revisited albums were awarded a Japanese Gold Sales Award for 100,000 copies sold. The UK tour included a show at Hammersmith Apollo, London which won Hackett the Event of the Year Award at the 2013 Progressive Music Awards. The show was released on CD and DVD as Genesis Revisited: Live at Hammersmith which reached No. 58 in the UK. Hackett completed a second tour with a rearranged setlist in 2014 which spawned Genesis Revisited: Live at the Royal Albert Hall. This reached No. 80 in the UK. Following the success of the Genesis Revisited tours, Hackett has considered himself as "the keeper of the flame of the early work" of Genesis.

In March 2015, Hackett released Wolflight. It reached No. 31 in the UK. Wolflight also contains Chris Squire's last studio recording with the track "Love Song to a Vampire". In September 2015, the independent music company Wienerworld released The Man, The Music, a documentary on Hackett's career that went to No. 5 on the UK DVD chart. That October, Universal/Virgin released Premonitions: The Charisma Years 1975–1983, a 14-disc box set of his first six studio albums with extra material including live recordings and new remixes by Steven Wilson.

Hackett's solo album The Night Siren (no. 28 UK album chart) was released in March 2017 and entered top 40 in six international album charts. The album continues the exploration of world music/progressive rock, and also contains influences from the Beatles' psychedelia period and classic science fiction. In October Hackett won the "Chris Squire Virtuoso" award at the 2017 Progressive Music Awards.

In October 2018, Hackett underwent a UK tour which featured his band performing Genesis and solo tracks with the 41-piece Heart of England Symphony Orchestra, conducted by Bradley Tkachuk. Tkachuk and his brother took the orchestral arrangements that they had produced for a concert that Hackett performed in Buffalo, New York in 2017, which also featured an orchestra on stage, as the basis for the orchestral parts used for the tour, including those from Hackett's collaboration with the Icelandic band Todmobile. A live album and concert film from the tour was released in 2019, entitled at the Royal Festival Hall, London was released in 2019, entitled Genesis Revisited Band & Orchestra: Live at the Royal Festival Hall.

Hackett released At the Edge of Light, in January 2019. The album reached no 28 in the UK and marked Hacketts 10th solo album on the UK top 40 album charts since his solo debut in 1975. In 2019, Hackett toured with a set comprising Selling England by the Pound performed in its entirety with other Genesis songs, plus tracks from At the Edge of Light and Spectral Mornings to commemorate the latter's fortieth anniversary. The show at London's Hammersmith Apollo, the last of the tour was released as a live album and concert film on 25 September 2020, entitled Selling England by the Pound & Spectral Mornings: Live at Hammersmith.

==== 2020s ====
In March 2020, Hackett cancelled his existing North American tour just before a performance in Harrisburg, PA due to the COVID-19 pandemic. He resumed touring with performances including Genesis' Seconds Out in September 2021 in Leicester followed by resumption of the cancelled North American tour in April 2022 in Boston following cancellation of the Canadian leg of the tour in March due to a case of COVID in the touring team.

In July 2020, Hackett released an autobiography, A Genesis in My Bed. In an interview promoting the book, he revealed that he was collaborating with Roger King on an acoustic album with an orchestra named Under a Mediterranean Sky, as well as a rock album with world music influences named Surrender of Silence. The albums were released on 22 January 2021 and 10 September 2021, respectively. Surrender of Silence entered the UK chart at 31 and made the top 10 chart in Germany.

Another solo album, The Circus and the Nightwhale was released 16 February 2024 on InsideOut Music.

On 16 April 2024, Hackett was hospitalised due to an adverse reaction to medication for a bronchial infection, with a show at Phoenix consequently cancelled.

== Personal life ==
Hackett has been married three times. His first was to Ellen Busse in 1972 and the couple had one son, Oliver (b. 1974). The marriage ended in a divorce in 1974. In 1981, Hackett married Brazilian painter and jewellery artist Kim Poor, who designed many of his album covers. They divorced in 2007, which led Poor to file a legal case against Hackett, claiming she was a joint owner of Stephen Hackett Ltd., into which all future royalties from Genesis songs he had written and performed were paid. In 2006, Hackett arranged for all royalties to be paid directly to him rather than the company, which Poor argued was in breach of the agreement whereby she was entitled to a share of the money. Poor also challenged Hackett's right to make new albums independently, causing further issues. The case was settled in 2010.

In June 2011, Hackett married author Jo Lehmann, who has written lyrics on several of Hackett's songs. Jo's sister Amanda is a singer, songwriter, and musician who has performed on several of Hackett's songs and tours since 2009.

== Live band members ==
Current

- Steve Hackett – guitar, harmonica, vocals (1978–present)
- Roger King – keyboards (2001–2025)
- Rob Townsend – saxophone, flute, keyboards, percussion, bass pedals, vocals (2001–2004, 2009–present)
- Nad Sylvan – vocals, tambourine (2013–present)
- Jonas Reingold – bass, 12-string guitar, bass pedals, vocals (2018–present)
- Craig Blundell – drums, percussion, vocals (2018–present)

== Discography ==
Studio albums

- Voyage of the Acolyte (1975)
- Please Don't Touch! (1978)
- Spectral Mornings (1979)
- Defector (1980)
- Cured (1981)
- Highly Strung (1983)
- Bay of Kings (1983)
- Till We Have Faces (1984)
- Momentum (1988)
- Guitar Noir (1993)
- Blues with a Feeling (1994)
- Genesis Revisited (1996)
- A Midsummer Night's Dream (1997)
- Darktown (1999)
- Feedback 86 (2000)
- To Watch the Storms (2003)
- Metamorpheus (2005)
- Wild Orchids (2006)
- Tribute (2008)
- Out of the Tunnel's Mouth (2009)
- Beyond the Shrouded Horizon (2011)
- Genesis Revisited II (2012)
- Wolflight (2015)
- The Night Siren (2017)
- At the Edge of Light (2019)
- Under a Mediterranean Sky (2021)
- Surrender of Silence (2021)
- The Circus and the Nightwhale (2024)
- The Roaring Waves (2026), with Steve Rothery
- Through a Sea of Flames (2027)

== Sources ==
- Banks, Tony; Collins, Phil; Gabriel, Peter; Hackett, Steve; Rutherford, Mike (2007). Dodd, Philipp (ed.). Genesis – Chapter and Verse. Weidenfeld & Nicolson. ISBN 978-0-297-84434-1.
- Strong, Martin C. (2000). The Great Rock Discography (5th ed.). Edinburgh: Mojo Books. ISBN 1-84195-017-3.
- Giammetti, Mario (2020). Genesis 1967 to 1975 - The Peter Gabriel Years. London: Kingmaker. ISBN 978-1-913218-62-1.
