= Cardinal =

Cardinal or The Cardinal most commonly refers to

- Cardinal (Catholic Church), a senior official of the Catholic Church
  - Member of the College of Cardinals
- Cardinalidae, a family of North and South American birds
- Cardinal number in mathematics
  - Large cardinal
- Cardinal direction, one of the primary directions: north, south, east, and west

Cardinal or The Cardinal may also refer to:

== Animals ==
=== Birds ===
- Cardinalis, genus of three species in the family Cardinalidae
  - Northern cardinal, Cardinalis cardinalis, the common cardinal of eastern North America
  - Pyrrhuloxia or desert cardinal, Cardinalis sinuatus, found in southwest North America
  - Vermilion cardinal, Cardinalis phoeniceus, found in Colombia and Venezuela
- Paroaria, a South American genus of birds in the family Thraupidae commonly called red-headed cardinals or cardinal-tanagers
- Yellow cardinal, Gubernatrix cristata a South American bird in the family Thraupidae

=== Other animals ===
- Argynnis pandora, a species of butterfly
- Cardinal tetra, a freshwater fish

== Businesses ==
- Cardinal Brewery, a brewery founded in 1788 by François Piller, in Fribourg, Switzerland
- Cardinal Technologies, a defunct modem manufacturer (1987–1997)
- Cardinal Health, a health care services company

== Christianity ==
- Cardinal (Church of England), either of two members of the College of Minor Canons of St. Paul's Cathedral

== Entertainment ==
=== Films ===
- Cardinals (film), a 2017 Canadian film
- The Cardinal (1936 film), a 1936 British historical drama
- The Cardinal, a 1963 American film

=== Games ===
- Cardinal (chess), a fairy chess piece, also known as the archbishop
- Cardinal, a participant in the army drinking game Cardinal Puff

=== Music ===
==== Groups ====
- Cardinal (band), indie pop duo formed in 1992
- The Cardinals (rock band), a group formed in 2003
- The Cardinals, a 1950s R&B group

==== Albums ====
- Cardinal (Cardinal album), 1994
- Cardinal (Pinegrove album), 2016

=== Television ===
- "Cardinal" (The Americans), the second episode of the second season of the television series The Americans
- Cardinal (TV series), a 2017 Canadian television series

=== Other arts, entertainment, and media ===
- Cardinal (comics), a supervillain appearing in Marvel Comics
- The Cardinal (1641 play), a Caroline era tragedy by James Shirley
- The Cardinal (1901 play), a historical play by the British writer Louis N. Parker
- The Cardinal System, a system appearing in the Sword Art Online series
- Cardinal, a stormtrooper officer featured in Star Wars: Phasma, a novel by Delilah S. Dawson

== Linguistics ==
- Cardinal numeral, a part of speech for expressing numbers by name
- Cardinal vowel, a concept in phonetics

== Mathematics ==
- Cardinal voting
- Cardinal number

== Navigation ==
- Cardinal mark, a sea mark used in navigation

== Places ==
- Cardinal, Manitoba, Canada
- Cardinal, Ontario, Canada
- Cardinal High School (Middlefield, Ohio), a public high school in Middlefield, Ohio, Geauga County, US
- Cardinal Mountain, a summit in California
- Cardinal Power Plant, a power plant in Jefferson County, Ohio
- Cardinal, Virginia, US
- C/2008 T2 (Cardinal), a comet

== Plants ==
- Cardinal (grape), a table grape first produced in California in 1939
- Lobelia cardinalis, also known as "cardinal flower"

== Sports ==
=== Athletic teams ===
- Ball State Cardinals, the athletic teams of Ball State University
- Catholic University Cardinals, the athletic teams of the Catholic University of America
- Incarnate Word Cardinals, the athletic teams of the University of the Incarnate Word
- Lamar Cardinals, the athletic teams of Lamar University in Beaumont, Texas, US
- Louisville Cardinals, the athletic teams of University of Louisville
- Mapúa Cardinals, the athletic teams of Mapúa University
- North Central Cardinals, the athletic teams of North Central College
- St. John Fisher Cardinals, the athletic teams of St. John Fisher College in Rochester, NY
- Stanford Cardinal, the athletic teams of Stanford University; named for the color but not the bird
- Wesleyan Cardinals, the athletic teams of Wesleyan University

=== Baseball ===
- Cardenales de Lara, a Venezuelan baseball team
- Front Royal Cardinals, an American baseball team
- St. Louis Cardinals, an American professional baseball team
- Hamilton Cardinals, a Canadian baseball team

=== Football (all codes) ===
- Arizona Cardinals, an American professional football team
- Assindia Cardinals, an American football club from Essen, Germany
- West Perth Football Club, an Australian rules football club in Western Australia
- Woking F.C., an English association football team

== Transport ==
=== Aircraft ===
- Cessna 177 Cardinal, a single engine aircraft
- St. Louis Cardinal C-2-110, a light aircraft built in 1928
- NCSIST Cardinal, a family of small UAVs

=== Trains ===
- Cardinal (train)
- The Cardinal (railcar)

=== Cars ===
- Ford Cardinal, abandoned project with a lightweight and compact Ford Taunus V4 engine

== Other uses ==
- Cardinal (color), a vivid red
- Cardinal (surname)
- Cardinal, a Ruby programming language implementation using for the Parrot virtual machine

== See also ==
- Cardenal, a surname
- Cardinal sin (disambiguation) or cardinal syn
- Cardinale, a surname
