= The Cardinal (disambiguation) =

The Cardinal is a 1963 American film.

The Cardinal may also refer to:

- The Cardinal (1641 play), a 1641 James Shirley play
- The Cardinal (1901 play) a 1901 play by Louis N. Parker
- The Cardinal (1936 film), a 1936 British film
- The Cardinal, a novel by Henry Morton Robinson, the basis for the 1963 film

== See also ==
- Cardinal (disambiguation)
