= Cardinal (surname) =

Cardinal is one of the most common surnames among aboriginal people in Canada (primarily Cree and Métis). It originated as a French name and came to New France and was part of the North American fur trade by the 1680s. In the 1780s, a small group of Cardinals came from Quebec to what is now northern Alberta to work in the fur trade, they stayed and intermarried with the local native peoples and reproduced prolifically. As a result, thousands of Cree and Métis people from across Alberta and beyond can trace their descent to the Cardinals. Notable people with the surname include:

- A.W. Cardinal, Canadian musician
- Aurèle Cardinal, Canadian architect
- Brian Cardinal, American basketball player
- Celeigh Cardinal, Canadian musician
- Douglas Cardinal (born 1934), Canadian architect
- Fernando Cardinal, Portuguese futsal player
- Gil Cardinal, Canadian architect of Métis descent
- Harold Cardinal (1945–2005), Cree writer and political leader
- Imajyn Cardinal, Canadian actress
- Jean-Guy Cardinal, Québécois politician
- Joseph-Narcisse Cardinal, Lower Canadian politician and rebel
- Judah ben Isaac Cardinal (13th century), Arabic-Hebrew translator
- Linda Cardinal (born 1959), Canadian political scientist
- Lorne Cardinal, Canadian actor
- Marie Cardinal (1929–2001), French novelist
- Martin Cardinal, Canadian police officer and subject of controversy
- Mark Cardinal, Canadian rugby player
- Mike Cardinal, Canadian politician
- Tantoo Cardinal, Canadian actress

== See also ==
- Cardinal (disambiguation)
- Cardenal, Spanish surname
- Cardinale, Italian surname
- Kardinal Offishall, stage name of Canadian rapper and producer Jason Drew Harrow
