= Cardinali =

Cardinali may refer to:

- a ready-to-wear clothing brand name launched by Marilyn, the wife of Harry Lewis in the 1960s
- Julieta Cardinali (born 1977), an Argentine film and television actress
- Michael Cardinali (born 1990), Italian professional football player
- Sonia Haoa Cardinali (born 1953), Rapanui archaeologist
- Terzilio Cardinali (1913–1944), Italian soldier

== See also ==
- Cardinale, a surname
