= NGC 1513 =

Open cluster in the constellation Perseus

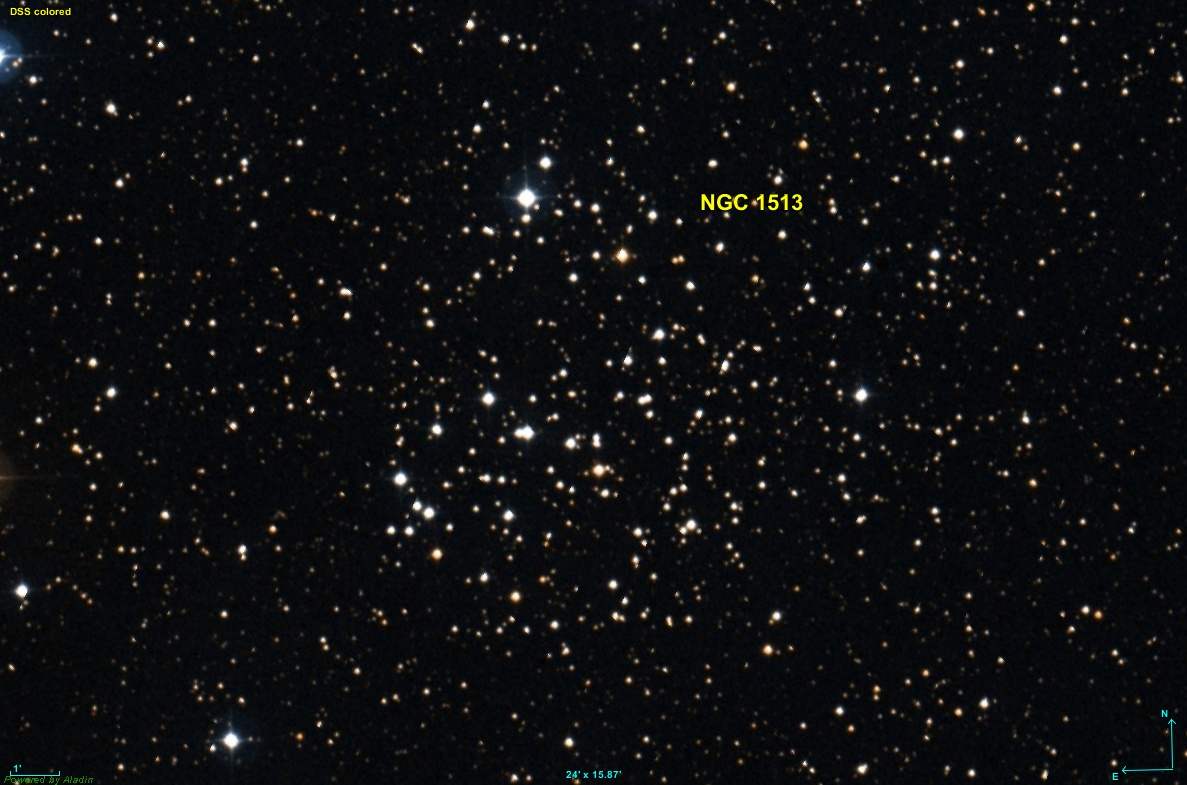
- Annotated DSS image of NGC 1513

Observation data (J2000 epoch)
- Right ascension: 04^{h} 09^{m} 52.80^{s}
- Declination: +49° 30′ 14.4″
- Distance: 4,824 ly (1,479.0 pc)
- Apparent magnitude (V): 8.4
- Apparent dimensions (V): 12.7′

Physical characteristics
- Radius: 65 ± 10 ly (tidal)
- Estimated age: 363 Myr
- Other designations: C 0406+493

Associations
- Constellation: Perseus

NGC 1513 is an open cluster of stars in the northern constellation of Perseus, positioned 2° SSE of the faint star Lambda Persei. The same telescope field contains the clusters NGC 1528 and NGC 1545. NGC 1513 was discovered in 1790 by the German-British astronomer William Herschel. The brightest component star is of magnitude 11, so a medium-sized amateur telescope is needed to observe 20-30 members. With a 12 in (30 cm) aperture telescope, most of the member stars can be resolved. This cluster is located at a distance of 4,824 light-years from the Sun, but is drawing closer with a radial velocity of −14.7 km/s.

This cluster has a rating of II2m in the Trumpler Catalogue, indicating it is moderately rich in stars with little central concentration. It is partially obscured by dust from the Persei dark cloud complex. NGC 1513 is 363 million years old and at least 433 stars in the field are members with a minimum 50% probability. The cluster has a core radius of 4.83 ± 0.55 ly (1.48 ± 0.17 pc) and a tidal radius of 65 ± 10 ly (20 ± 3 pc). It has a metallicity of [M/H] = −0.10±0.10 dex, indicating a lower abundance of elements more massive than helium compared to the Sun.
