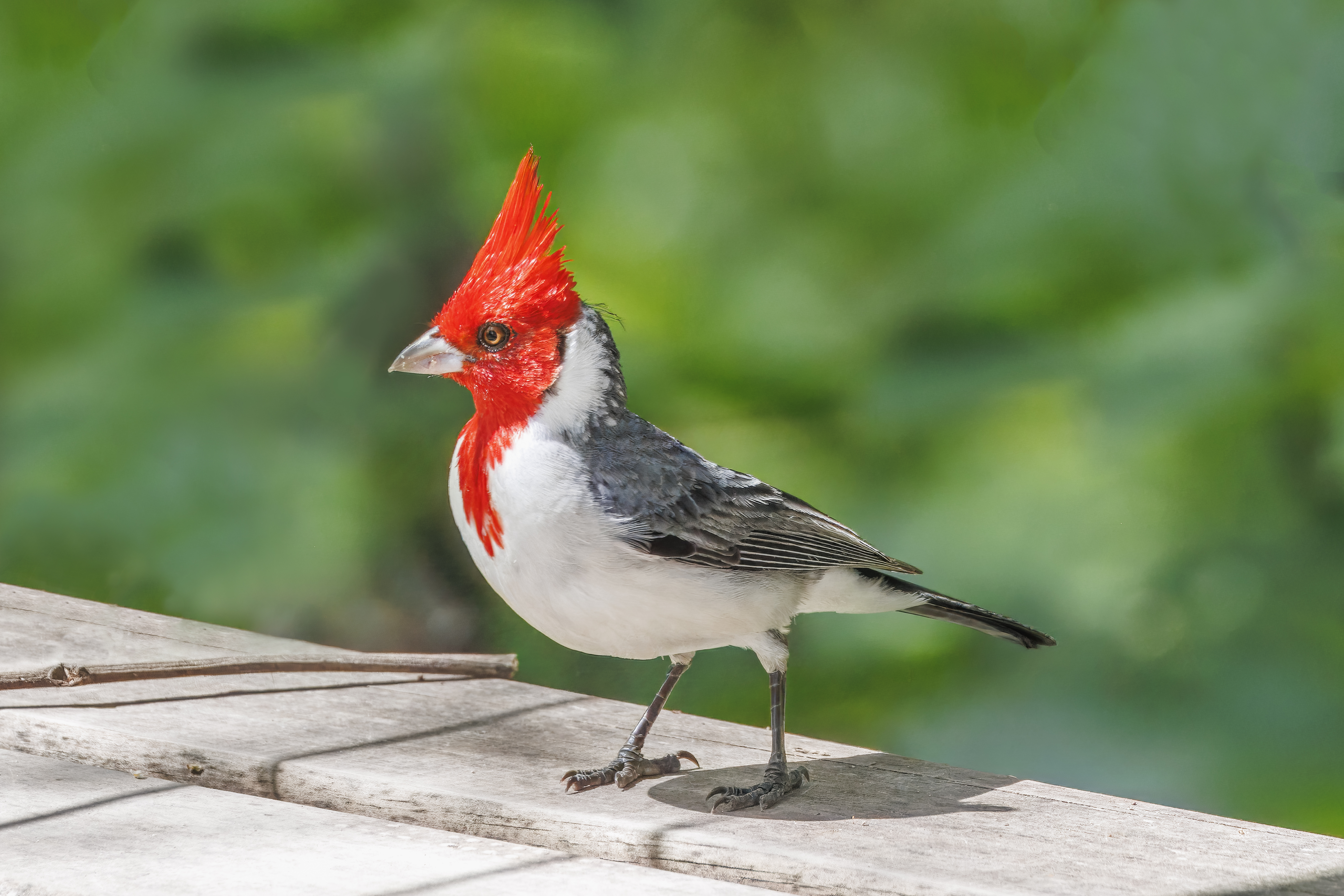
- Buenos Aires, Argentina

Conservation status
- Least Concern (IUCN 3.1)
- CITES Appendix II

Scientific classification
- Kingdom: Animalia
- Phylum: Chordata
- Class: Aves
- Order: Passeriformes
- Family: Thraupidae
- Genus: Paroaria
- Species: P. coronata

Binomial name
- Paroaria coronata (Miller, JF, 1776)

Audio
- Song of red-crested cardinal

= Red-crested cardinal =

Species of bird

The red-crested cardinal (Paroaria coronata) is a passerine bird in the tanager family Thraupidae. Notwithstanding its similar name, this bird is not closely related to the true cardinal family Cardinalidae. It is sometimes known as the Brazilian cardinal.

== Taxonomy ==
In 1776 the English illustrator John Frederick Miller included a hand-coloured plate of the red-crested cardinal in his Icones animalium et plantarum. He coined the binomial name Loxia coronata. The type locality was subsequently designated as Rio Grande do Sul in southern Brazil. The red-crested cardinal is now one of six species placed in the genus Paroaria that was introduced in 1832 by the French naturalist Charles Lucien Bonaparte. The species is monotypic: no subspecies are recognised. The genus name is from Tiéguacú paroára, a name for a small yellow, red, and grey bird in the extinct Tupi language. The specific epithet coronata is Latin meaning "crowned"

== Description ==
The red-crested cardinal is a medium-sized species showing a red head, with a red bib and a short red crest that the bird raises when excited. Belly, breast, and undertail are white, with a gray back, wings, and tail. Wing coverts are gray, but the primaries, secondaries, and rectrices show a darker gray. Juveniles are similar to the adults, but they show a dull brownish orange head and bib.

This species is very similar to a close relative, the red-cowled cardinal (P. dominicana). It is also similar to the yellow-billed cardinal (P. capitata), but the latter bird has a black throat, darker upper parts, and a bright yellow bill.

== Distribution and habitat ==
This species can be found mainly in Brazil's Rio Grande do Sul, southern part of the Pantanal, northern Argentina, Bolivia, Paraguay, and Uruguay. It has also been introduced to Hawaii, Puerto Rico, and Chile. In Brazil, it has been introduced to various places outside its historical range, as in the Tietê Ecological Park in São Paulo.

Its natural habitats are subtropical or tropical dry shrubland and heavily degraded former forest, at an elevation up to 500 metres (1,600 ft) above sea level. It often occurs close to rivers, marshes, and lakes.

Song of Red-crested cardinal

== Behaviour and ecology ==
=== Food and feeding ===
This species mainly feeds on seeds (of Chloris virgata, Eleusine tristachya, Setaria parviflora, and Spergula villosa), fruits (of Celtis tala, Grabowskia duplicata, Holmbergia tweedii, Morus alba, and Sapium haematospermum), insects, and small arthropods, generally searched for on the ground in pairs or small groups. The average lifespan is about 3.8 years.

== Gallery ==
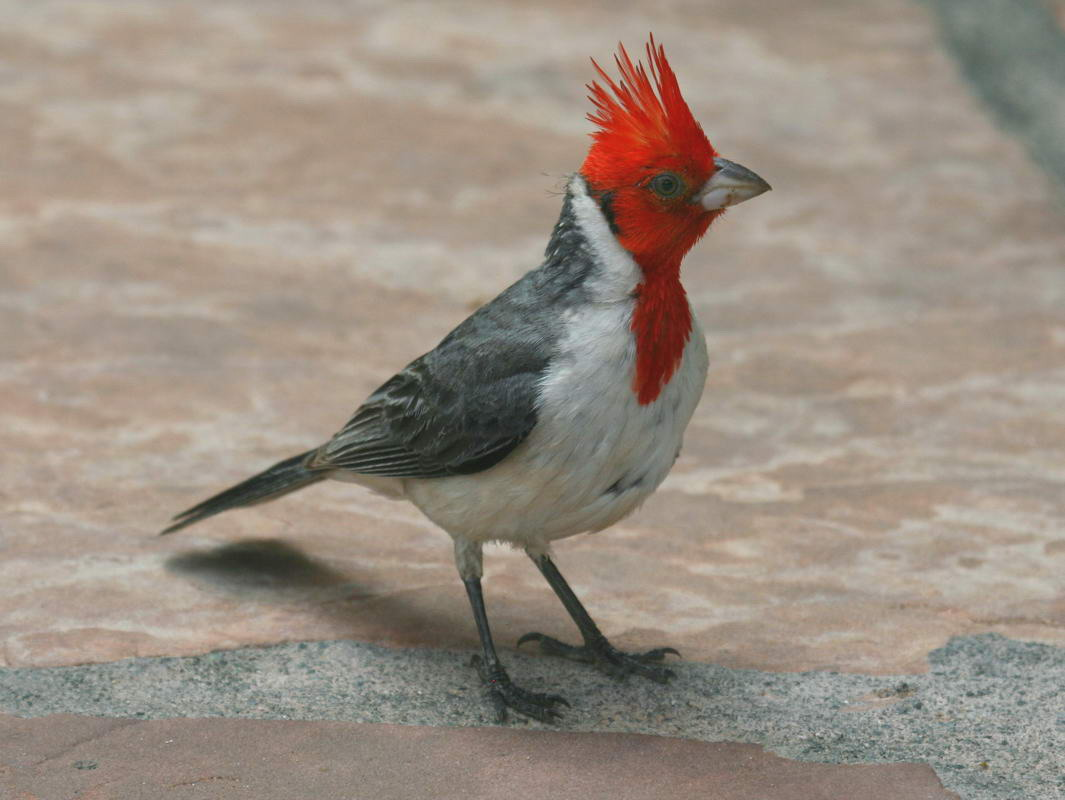
Fully displayed crest - Maui, Hawaii

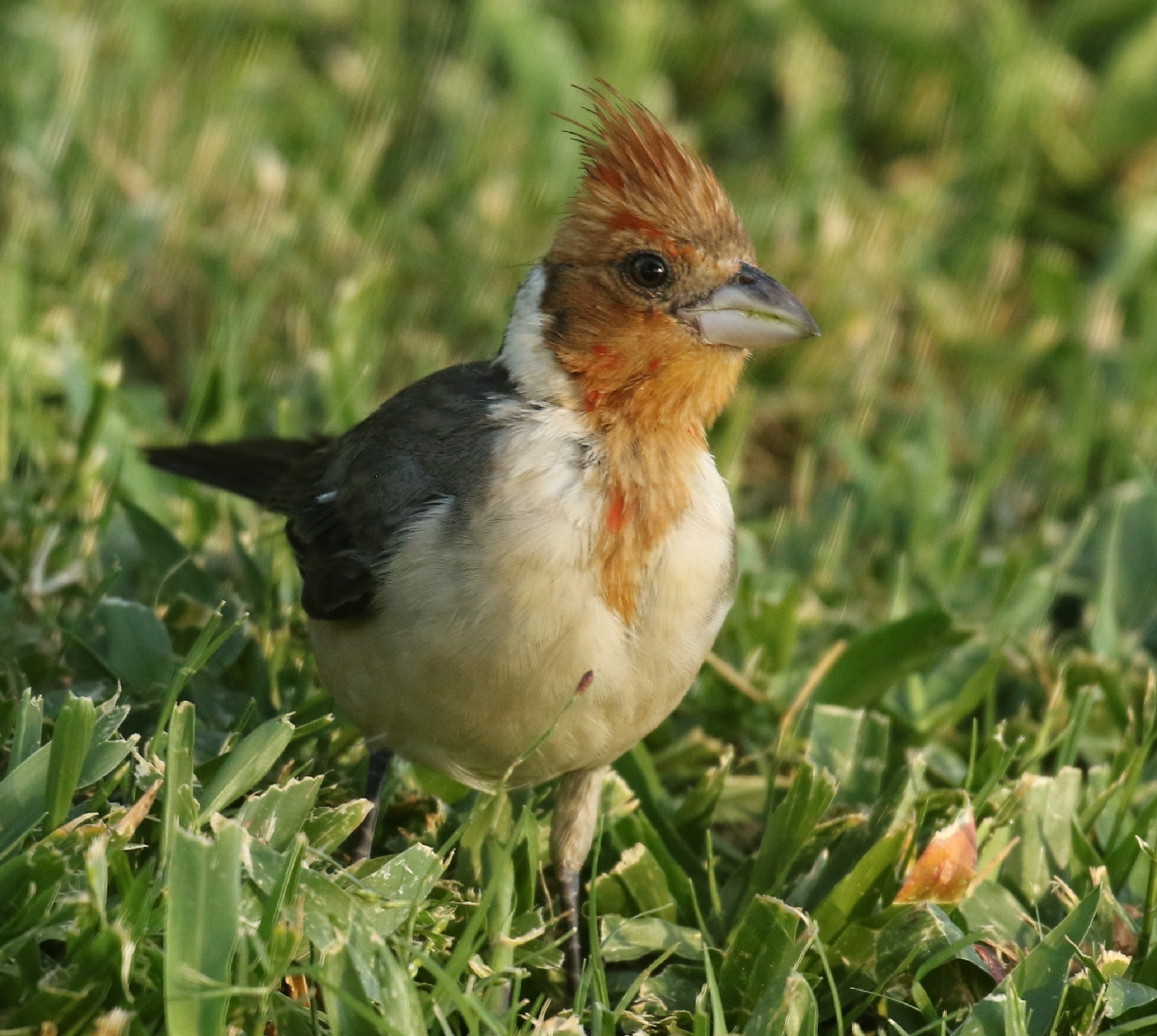
Juvenile - Kapiolani Park, Oahu, Hawaii

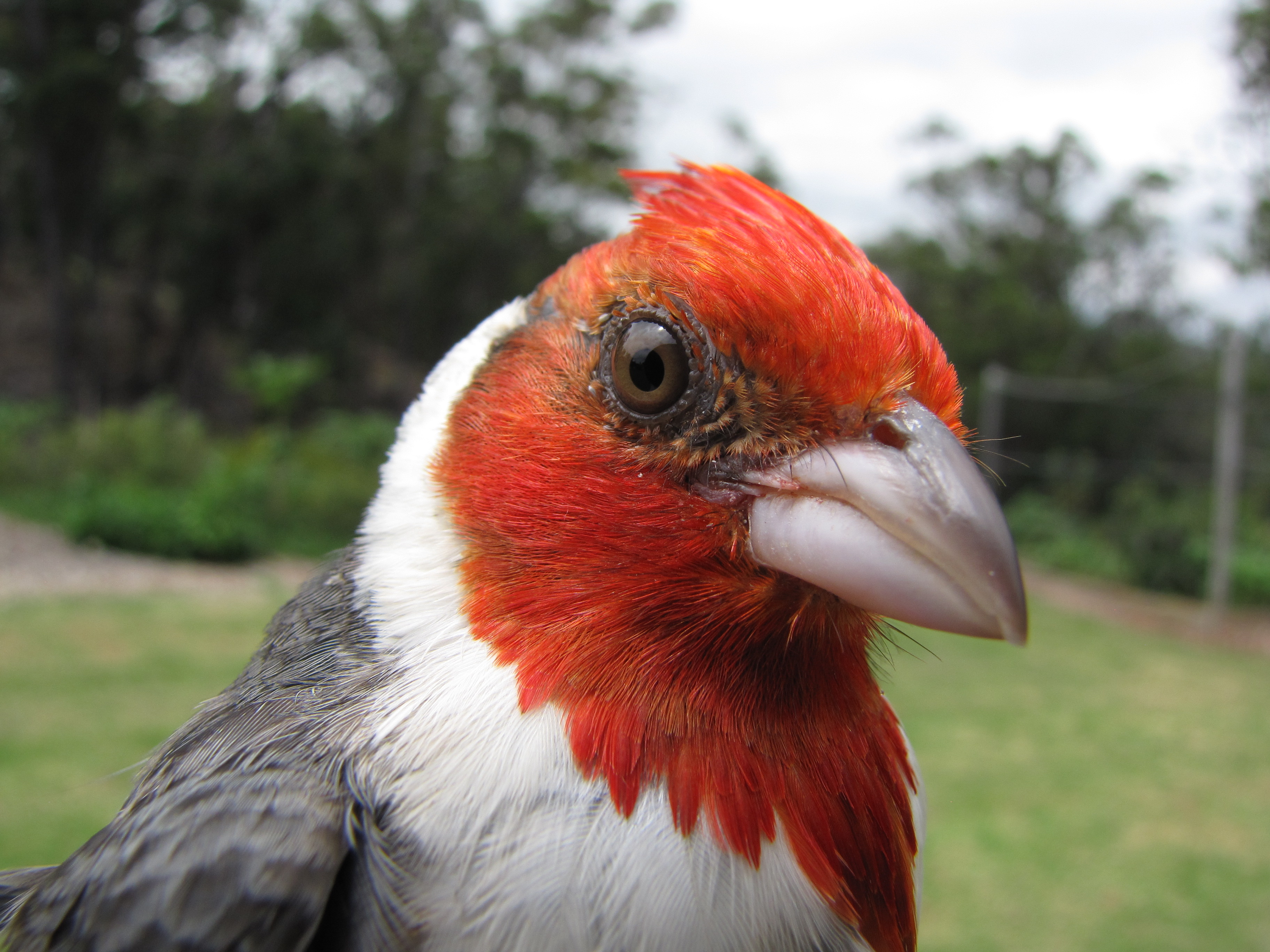
Close-up

Video
