= C/2008 T2 (Cardinal) =

Parabolic comet

Discovery
- Discovered by: Rob D. Cardinal
- Discovery site: Rothney Astrophysical Observatory
- Discovery date: 1 October 2008

Orbital characteristics
- Epoch: 8 February 2009 (JD 2454870.5
- Perihelion: 1.202 AU
- Eccentricity: 1.00011
- Inclination: 56.304°
- Longitude of ascending node: 309.68°
- Argument of periapsis: 215.87°
- Last perihelion: 13 June 2009
- T_{Jupiter}: 0.754
- Earth MOID: 0.318 AU
- Jupiter MOID: 1.527 AU

Physical characteristics
- Mean radius: 1.865 km (1.159 mi)
- Comet total magnitude (M1): 6.3
- Comet nuclear magnitude (M2): 13.2±0.8
- Apparent magnitude: 8.5–9.0 (2009 apparition)

C/2008 T2 (Cardinal), is a non-periodic comet. It was discovered by Rob. D. Cardinal from the University of Calgary. It was visible as a telescopic and binocular object during 2009. It passed near the Perseus star clusters NGC 1528 on 15 March and NGC 1545 on 17 March 2009. It also passed near the Auriga star clusters Messier 38 on 14 April, Messier 36 on 17 April, and Messier 37 in on 21 April 2009, and passed near Comet Lulin on 12 May 2009, for observers on Earth. It peaked in brightness in June–July 2009 at magnitude 8.5-9.
