= Antonio Gramsci Battalion =

The Antonio Gramsci Battalion was formed on 9 November 1943 from captured Italian soldiers who wished to continue the war by resisting Nazi German forces in Albania. In the beginning its forces amounted to 137 men who chose their own leaders: Terzilio Cardinali (commander), Alfredo d'Angelo (political commissar), Giuseppe Monti (vice commander) and Dominico Bogatai (vice commissar). One Albanian partisan, Sami Kotherja, was also appointed to battalion command. The battalion was composed of two companies.

Their first battle against the Germans took place on 15 November 1943 in Berat. After the capitulation of Italy, the city of Berat was under the control of the Albanian partisans. Italian forces were not familiar with partisan tactics and while German forces attacked the city, the battalion forces remained static in their positions giving the Germans the opportunity to encircle them. After five hours of fierce fighting, they managed to break through German lines with great losses. The Germans executed the wounded and the prisoners they had captured from the battalion.

After this battle, the effectives were filled with other Italians who wanted to fight against the Germans. During 1943–1944, the Antonio Gramsci Battalion remained an integral part of Partisan First Shock Brigade, which was considered a corps d'elite of the partisan army. It participated in all of the major battles that this partisan army was involved in. Its commander, Terzilio Cardinali, was killed in action on July 8, 1944, during fighting in the Diber region. The battalion took also part in the operations for the liberation of Tirana in November 1944.

After the liberation of Albania, the battalion was elevated to the rank of a brigade, composed from other Italian fighters who were dispersed in other partisan units. Later on it was elevated to the rank of a division with the same name. In May 1945, in mutual agreement with the Italian government, its forces were repatriated to Italy with a military honor ceremony.
