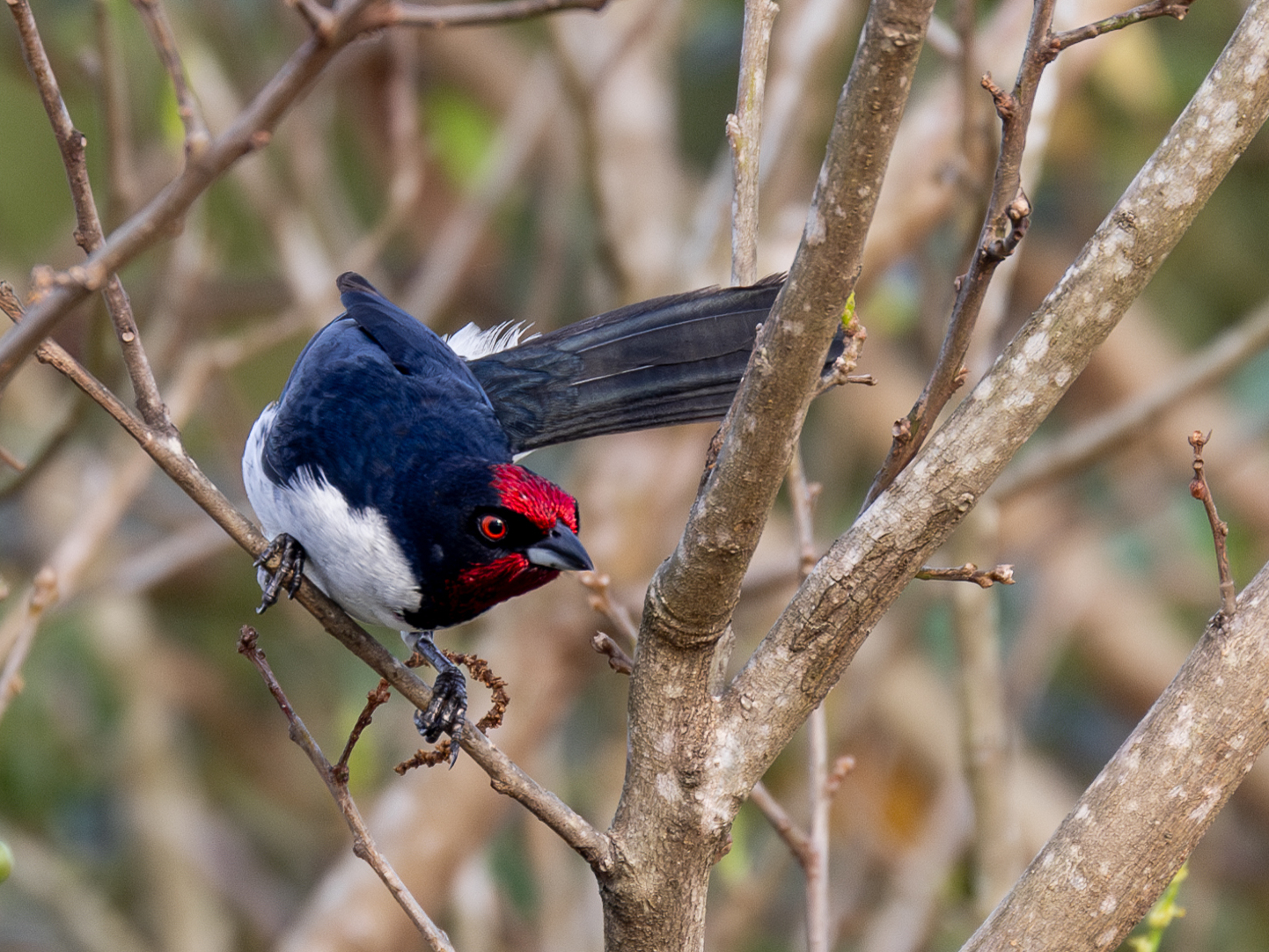

Conservation status
- Least Concern (IUCN 3.1)

Scientific classification
- Kingdom: Animalia
- Phylum: Chordata
- Class: Aves
- Order: Passeriformes
- Family: Thraupidae
- Genus: Paroaria
- Species: P. baeri

Binomial name
- Paroaria baeri Hellmayr, 1907

= Crimson-fronted cardinal =

Species of bird

The crimson-fronted cardinal (Paroaria baeri) is a bird species in the tanager family (Thraupidae). It is not very closely related to the cardinals proper (Cardinalidae). It is endemic to Brazil.

Its natural habitats are subtropical or tropical moist lowland forests and subtropical or tropical moist shrubland. The crimson-fronted cardinal is about 16.5 cm in length, and is most often slim with a rounded crown. Its voice is rather harsh and vigorous and includes descending, harsh whistles. Very little is known about its diet; however, it most likely eats insects and a few fruits.

The breeding season is often thought to be October through January, with some nests accompanied by eggs found in mid-December.
