= L'abito nero da sposa =

1945 film

- Film poster
- Directed by: Luigi Zampa
- Screenplay by: Mario Pannunzio; Ennio Flaiano; Riccardo Freda; Gherardo Gherardi; Luigi Zampa; Leo Longanesi
- Based on: The Cardinal by Louis N. Parker
- Produced by: Vittorio Vassarotti
- Starring: Fosco Giachetti; Jacqueline Laurent; Enzo Fiermonte
- Cinematography: Gábor Pogány; Aldo Tonti
- Edited by: Maria Rosada
- Music by: Carlo Piero Giorgi
- Production company: Vi-Va Film
- Distributed by: Produttori Associatti
- Release date: 17 May 1945
- Running time: 96 minutes
- Country: Italy

L'abito nero da sposa (transl. The Black Wedding Dress) is a 1945 Italian historical drama film directed by Luigi Zampa and starring Fosco Giachetti. It is based on the play The Cardinal by Louis N. Parker.

== Cast ==
- Fosco Giachetti as Il cardinale Giovanni de Medici
- Jacqueline Laurent as Berta Chigi
- Enzo Fiermonte as Giuliano de Medici
- Carlo Tamberlani as Andrea Strozzi
- Aldo Silvani as Bartolomeo Chigi
- Domenico Viglione Borghese as Il governatore Baglioni
- Manoel Roero as Raffaello (as Manuel Roero)
- Fausto Guerzoni as Beppe, il campanaro
- Evelina Paoli as Madonna de Medici
- Peppino Spadaro as Luigi
- Renato Chiantoni as Bernardino
- Emilio Petacci as Un mercante della statua di Venere
- Franco Pesce as Un invitato alla festa

== Production ==
L'abito nero da sposa is based on the play The Cardinal by Louis N. Parker. The film had some notoriety in Italy as it was blacklisted by the church. The film was originally going to be the directorial debut of Mario Pannunzio, who dropped out of the project. Luigi Zampa, who was in the army and about to leave to the Russian front, was given a 60 day permit to direct the film. During principal shooting on the film, on September 8, 1943 General Pietro Badoglio signed an armistice and joined the allies as co-belligerent. Film was put on hold until the American forces were in Italy, and filming continued in June 1944.

== Release ==
L'abito nero da sposa was distributed by Produttori Associatti in Italy on May 17, 1945. Zampa later spoke on about his early films, stating that he "prefer not to remember [them]. They taught me how to move the camera and direct the actors. But I never tried to watch them again, there is nothing inside them. They were just spectacles."
