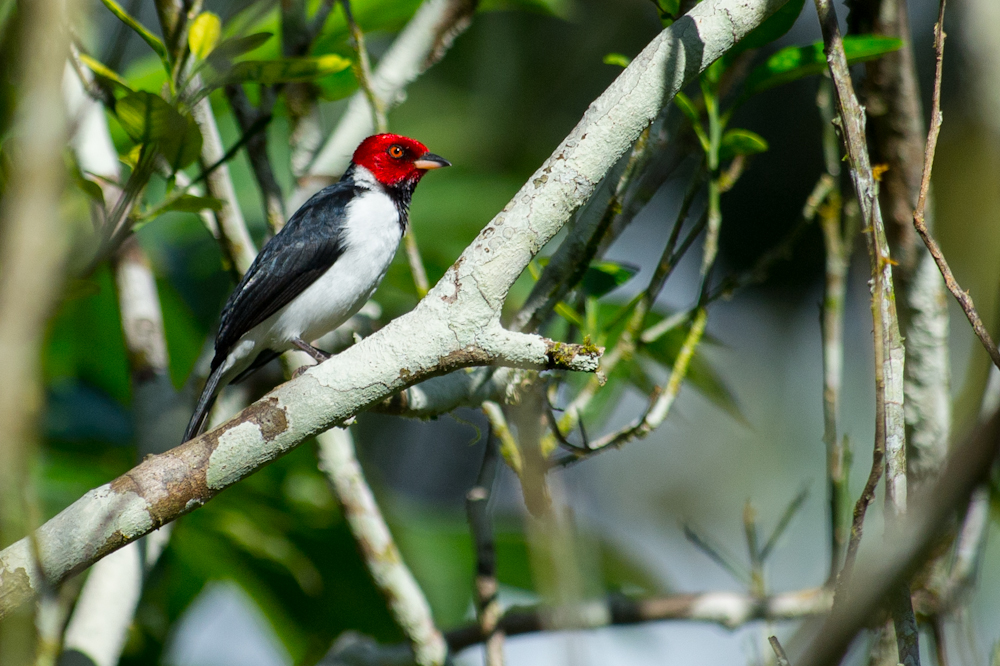

Conservation status
- Least Concern (IUCN 3.1)

Scientific classification
- Kingdom: Animalia
- Phylum: Chordata
- Class: Aves
- Order: Passeriformes
- Family: Thraupidae
- Genus: Paroaria
- Species: P. gularis

Binomial name
- Paroaria gularis (Linnaeus, 1766)

Synonyms
- Tanagra gularis Linnaeus, 1766

= Red-capped cardinal =

Species of bird

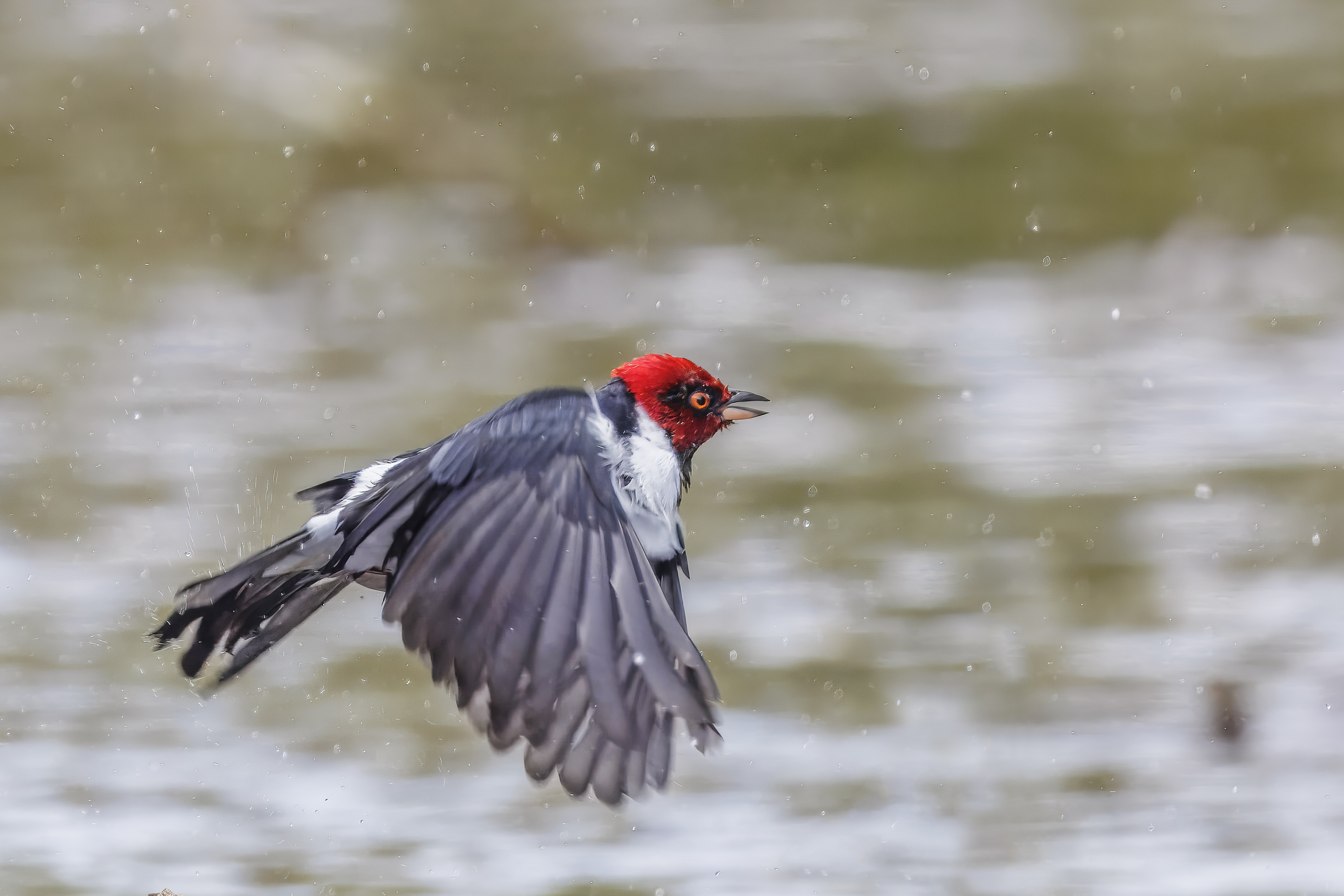
P. g. gularis, in Ecuador

The red-capped cardinal (Paroaria gularis) is a small species of bird in the tanager family Thraupidae. It is found in South America.

== Taxonomy ==
In 1760 the French zoologist Mathurin Jacques Brisson included a description of the red-capped cardinal in the supplement to his Ornithologie based on a specimen collected in "America". He used the French name Le cardinal d'Amérique and the Latin name Cardinalis americanis. Although Brisson coined Latin names, these do not conform to the binomial system and are not recognised by the International Commission on Zoological Nomenclature. When in 1766 the Swedish naturalist Carl Linnaeus updated his Systema Naturae for the twelfth edition he added 240 species that had been previously described by Brisson in his Ornithologie. One of these was the red-capped cardinal. Linnaeus included a terse description, coined the binomial name Tanagra gularis and cited Brisson's work. The specific name gularis is Latin for "of the throat". The type locality has been restricted to French Guiana. This species is now placed in the genus Paroaria that was introduced by the French ornithologist Charles Lucien Bonaparte in 1832.

The genus Paroaria is classified in the family Thraupidae, unlike the cardinals proper which are in the Cardinalidae.

The masked cardinal was formerly considered conspecific with the red-capped cardinal. The masked cardinal markedly differs from the red-capped cardinal by the black ear-coverts and the red (not black) lower throat and upper chest. Additionally, its lower mandible is typically whitish, but this is not entirely consistent, as it occasionally is pale flesh-coloured. This distinctive taxon was determined a different species, as suggested by the lack of hybridization with P. g. gularis in the limited area of overlap in southern Venezuela.

There are two subspecies:

- P. g. gularis (Linnaeus, 1766) (eastern Colombia to eastern Peru and through the Guianas to central Brazil)
- P. g. cervicalis Sclater, PL, 1862 (north east Bolivia and south west Brazil

== Description ==
The adult red-capped cardinal is 16.5 cm (6.5 in) long and weighs about 22 g (0.78 oz). The nominate subspecies has a crimson head, blackish lores and ocular region, and shiny black upperparts, apart from a white partial collar extending up the neck sides from the white underparts. The throat is black, extending to a point on the upper chest. The upper mandible is black, while the lower is pale flesh-coloured. The legs are dark grey (almost black) and the iris is brownish-orange. In pattern the juvenile resemble the adults, but the upperparts are dusky-brown, the head is deep brownish-buff (darker on the cap), the bill is entirely black and the iris is pale, dull creamy-yellow.

The song is a variable, often repeated series of suweet-chu notes, and the call is a sharp chep.

== Distribution and habitat ==
It occurs in lowlands of the Guianas, Venezuela, eastern Colombia, eastern Ecuador, eastern Peru, northern and eastern Bolivia and the Amazon basin in Brazil. In Brazil it is, except for populations in the relatively open lowlands of north-eastern Roraima and along the Branco River and lower Rio Negro, apparently largely absent from the regions north of the northern bank of the Amazon River, but these regions are generally very poorly known and its presence cannot be discounted, especially in the section between the lower Rio Negro and Rio Jari (the river on the border between Pará and Amapá).

This is a bird of swamps, mangrove, várzea and other semi-open areas near water. It is generally common, and even occurs in lightly wooded wet habitats in towns or cities (e.g. Manaus and Puerto Maldonado).

== Behaviour ==
The red-capped cardinal feeds on insects, rice and fruit. It is usually found in conspicuous pairs or family groups. If there is a well-marked breeding season, it extends over much of the year. The red-capped cardinal has been recorded to breed at least from June to September in northern South America but at Sacha Lodge at the Napo River (Ecuador) an adult was seen feeding a fledgling shiny cowbird (a brood parasite) in late March. This suggests that breeding can also occur as early as February/March. There is no indication for a difference in breeding seasons between the red-capped and the masked cardinals.

They build a shallow open cup nest, some 9–10 cm (3.5–3.9 in) wide and 7 cm (2.8 in) high outside with a 7 cm (2.8 in) wide by 4 cm (1.6 in) deep cup, in a tree or some other secure spot. In Ecuador, a nest in the Cuyabeno Wildlife Reserve was built in the roots of a Macrolobium sp. standing in water, while one at Sacha Lodge was 4 m (13 ft) above ground in a tree. For nest material, it uses rootlets, thin twigs, and ferns. The clutch is two or three eggs. These have a background colour varying between whitish and dull olive and have dense dark brown flecks and blotches, heavier at the blunt end. They measure about 21.5 mm × 16 mm (0.85 in × 0.63 in). This species is parasitised by the shiny cowbird (Molothrus bonariensis).
