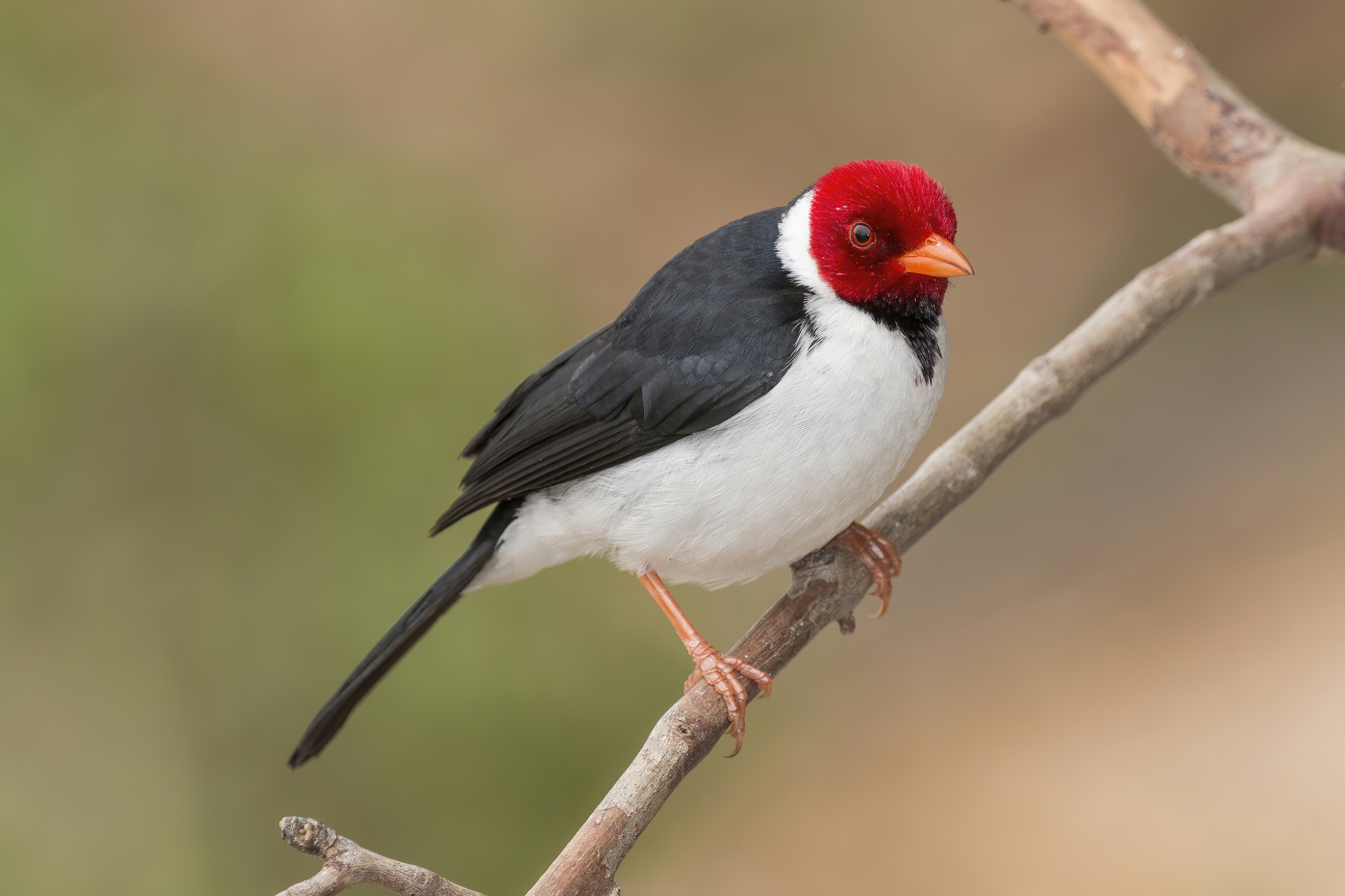
- Adult in the Pantanal, Brazil
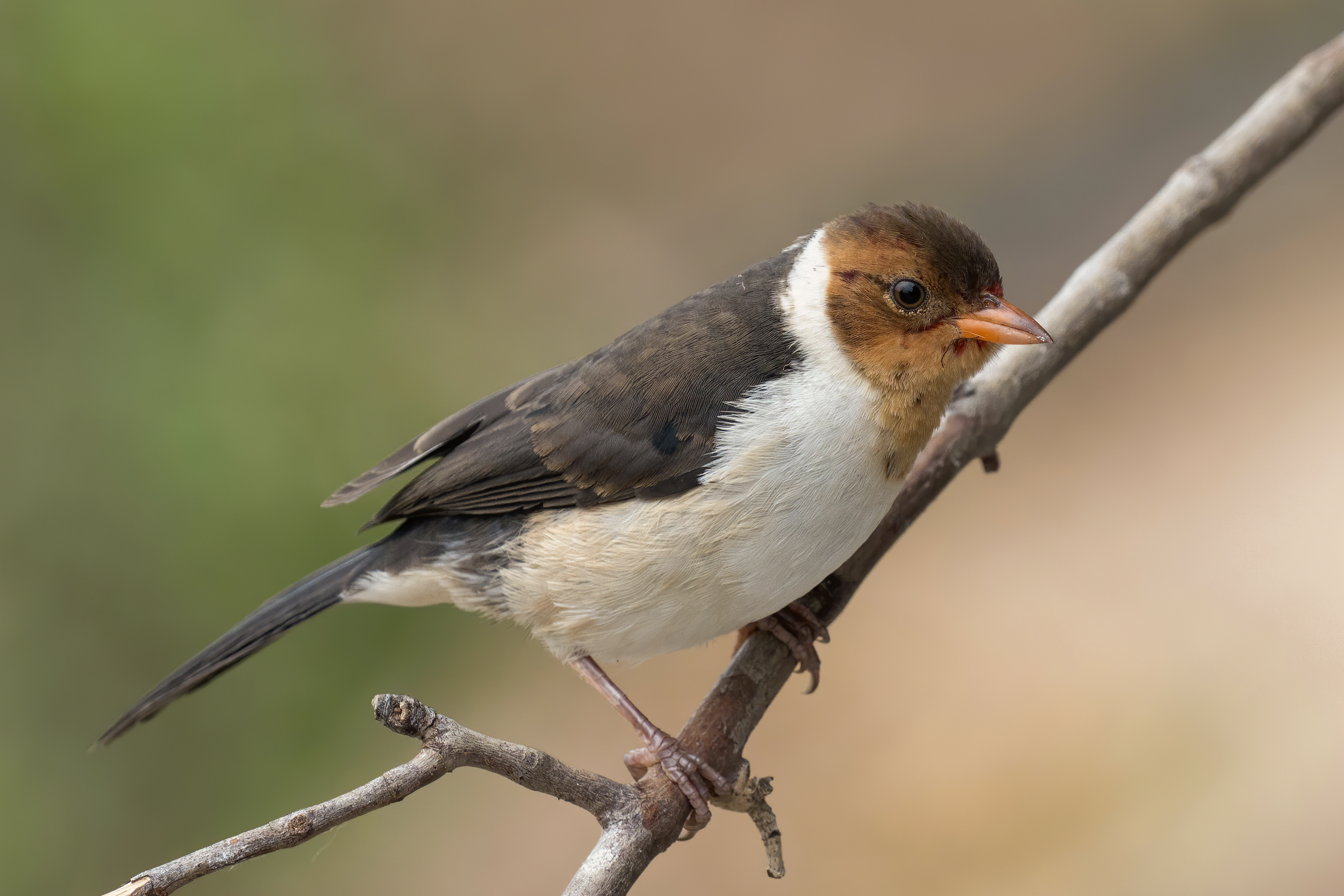
- Juvenile in the Pantanal, Brazil

Conservation status
- Least Concern (IUCN 3.1)
- CITES Appendix II

Scientific classification
- Kingdom: Animalia
- Phylum: Chordata
- Class: Aves
- Order: Passeriformes
- Family: Thraupidae
- Genus: Paroaria
- Species: P. capitata

Binomial name
- Paroaria capitata (d'Orbigny & Lafresnaye, 1837)

= Yellow-billed cardinal =

Species of bird

The yellow-billed cardinal (Paroaria capitata) is a bird species in the tanager family (Thraupidae). It is not very closely related to the cardinals proper (Cardinalidae).

It occurs in Brazil, Paraguay, Bolivia, Uruguay, and northern Argentina and has been introduced on the island of Hawaiʻi. It breeds in moist shrubland. The yellow-billed cardinal could be easily confused with the red-crested cardinal. The yellow-billed cardinal does not have a crest.
