= C/2007 N3 (Lulin) =

Non-periodic comet

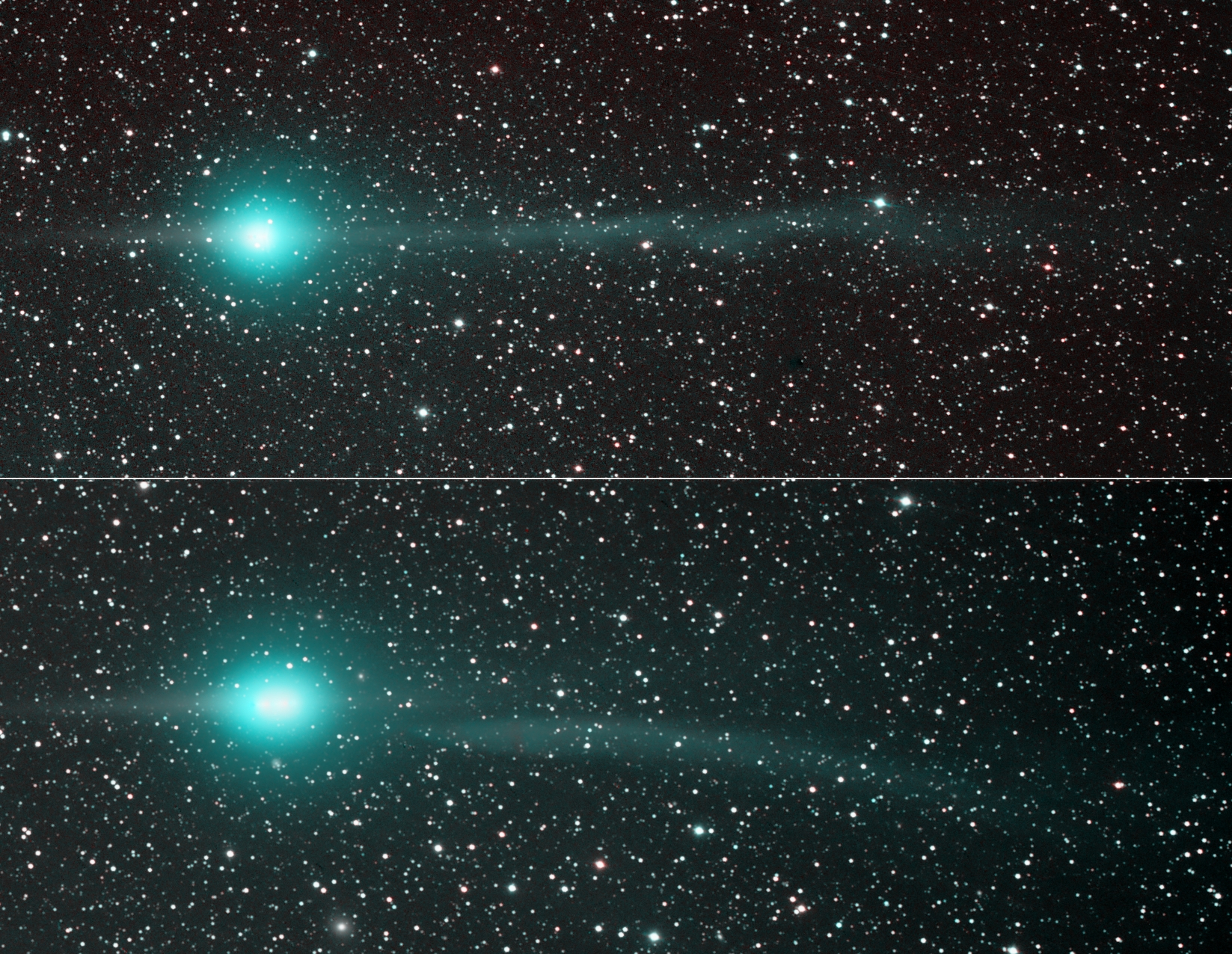
- Comet Lulin as seen on 31 January 2009 (top) and 4 February 2009 (bottom).

Discovery
- Discovered by: Quanzhi Ye; Lin Chi-Sheng
- Discovery site: Lulin Observatory (D35); 0.41-m Ritchey–Chrétien
- Discovery date: 11 July 2007

Designations
- Alternative designations: CK07N030

Orbital characteristics
- Epoch: 6 December 2008 (JD 2454806.5)
- Aphelion: ~64,000 AU (inbound); ~2,400 AU (outbound)
- Perihelion: 1.212 AU
- Semi-major axis: 1200 AU
- Eccentricity: 0.99998
- Orbital period: 42,000 years (outbound)
- Inclination: 178.37°
- Longitude of ascending node: 338.54°
- Argument of periapsis: 136.86°
- Last perihelion: 10 January 2009
- T_{Jupiter}: –1.365
- Earth MOID: 0.211 AU
- Jupiter MOID: 0.101 AU

Physical characteristics
- Mean radius: 6.10±0.25 km
- Synodic rotation period: 41.45±0.05 hours
- Comet total magnitude (M1): 10.2
- Apparent magnitude: 4.5–5.0 (2009 apparition)

Comet Lulin, formal designation C/2007 N3, (Traditional Chinese:鹿林彗星) is a non-periodic comet discovered by Quanzhi Ye and Lin Chi-Sheng from the Lulin Observatory. It peaked in brightness at magnitude between +4.5 and +5, becoming visible to the naked eye, and arrived at perigee for observers on Earth on February 24, 2009, and at 0.411 AU (61.5 million km; 38.2 million mi) from Earth.

== Discovery ==
The comet was first photographed by astronomer Lin Chi-Sheng (林啟生) with a 0.41-metre (16 in) telescope at the Lulin Observatory in Nantou, Taiwan on July 11, 2007. However, it was the 19-year-old Ye Quanzhi (葉泉志) from Sun Yat-sen University in China, who identified the new object from three of the photographs taken by Lin.

Initially, the object was thought to be a magnitude 18.9 asteroid, but images taken a week after the discovery with a larger 0.61-metre (24 in) telescope revealed the presence of a faint coma.

The discovery occurred as part of the Lulin Sky Survey project to identify small objects in the Solar System, particularly Near-Earth Objects. The comet was named "Comet Lulin" after the observatory, and its official designation is Comet C/2007 N3.

== Observational history ==
The comet became visible to the naked eye from dark-sky sites around 7 February. It figured near the double star Zubenelgenubi on 6 February, near Spica on 15–16 February, near Gamma Virginis on February 19 and near the star cluster M44 on March 5 and 6. It also figured near the planetary nebula NGC 2392 on 14 March, and near the double star Wasat around 17 March. The comet was near conjunction with Saturn on February 23, and outward-first headed towards its aphelion, against the present position of background stars, in the direction of Regulus in the constellation of Leo, as noted on 26–27 February 2009. It passed near Comet Cardinal on May 12, 2009.

According to NASA, Comet Lulin's green color comes from a combination of gases that make up its local atmosphere, primarily diatomic carbon, which appears as a green glow when illuminated by sunlight in the vacuum of space. When SWIFT observed comet Lulin on 28 January 2009; the comet was shedding nearly 3,000 litres (800 US gal) of water each second. Comet Lulin was methanol-rich.

== Orbit ==
Astronomer Brian Marsden of the Smithsonian Astrophysical Observatory calculated that Comet Lulin reached its perihelion on January 10, 2009, at a distance of 182 million km (113 million mi) from the Sun.

The orbit of Comet Lulin is very nearly a parabola (parabolic trajectory), according to Marsden. The comet had an epoch 2009 eccentricity of 0.999986, and has an epoch 2010 eccentricity of 0.999998. It is moving in a retrograde orbit at a very low inclination of just 1.6° from the ecliptic.

Given the extreme orbital eccentricity of this object, different epochs can generate quite different heliocentric unperturbed two-body best fit solutions to the aphelion distance (maximum distance) of this object. For objects at such high eccentricity, the sun's barycentric coordinates are more stable than heliocentric coordinates. Using JPL Horizons, the barycentric orbital elements for epoch 2014-Jan-01 generate a semi-major axis of about 1,200 AU (180 billion km) and a period of about 42,000 years.

== Disconnected tail ==
On February 4, 2009, a team of Italian astronomers witnessed "an intriguing phenomenon in Comet Lulin's tail". Team leader Ernesto Guido explains:

"We photographed the comet using a remotely controlled telescope in New Mexico, and our images clearly showed a disconnection event. While we were looking, part of the comet's plasma tail was torn away."

Guido and colleagues believe the event was caused by a magnetic disturbance in the solar wind hitting the comet. Magnetic mini-storms in comet tails have been observed before—most famously in 2007, when NASA's STEREO spacecraft watched a coronal mass ejection crash into Comet Encke. Encke lost its tail in dramatic fashion, much as Comet Lulin did on February 4.

== See also ==
- List of Solar System objects by greatest aphelion
