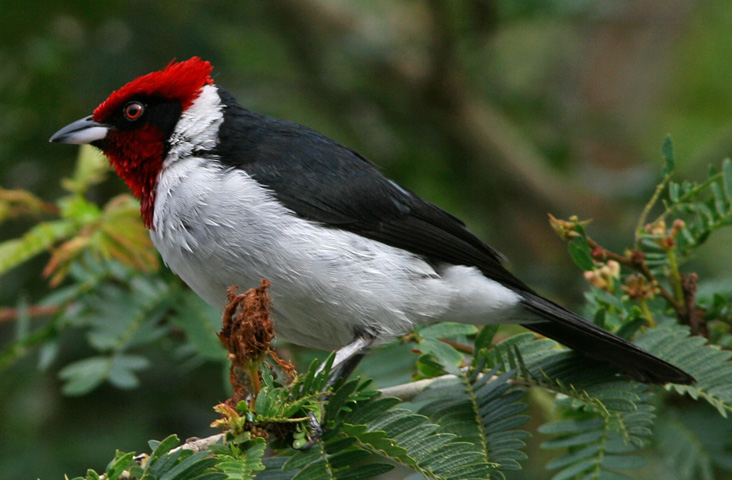

Conservation status
- Least Concern (IUCN 3.1)

Scientific classification
- Kingdom: Animalia
- Phylum: Chordata
- Class: Aves
- Order: Passeriformes
- Family: Thraupidae
- Genus: Paroaria
- Species: P. nigrogenis

Binomial name
- Paroaria nigrogenis (Lafresnaye, 1846)

Synonyms
- Paroaria gularis nigrogenis

= Masked cardinal =

Species of bird

The masked cardinal (Paroaria nigrogenis) is a bird species in the tanager family (Thraupidae). It is not very closely related to the cardinals proper (Cardinalidae).

It is found in Trinidad, far north-eastern Colombia, and northern Venezuela. It was previously considered conspecific with the red-capped cardinal (Paroaria gularis), from which it differs by the black ear-coverts and the red (not black) lower throat and upper chest. Additionally, its lower mandible is typically whitish, but this is not entirely consistent, as it occasionally is pale flesh-coloured. This distinctive taxon is a distinct species, as suggested by the lack of hybridization with P. g. gularis in the limited area of overlap in southern Venezuela. The common name masked cardinal was suggested.
