= Cardenal =

Cardenal is a surname of Spanish origin. People with that name include:

- Ernesto Cardenal (1925–2020), Nicaraguan cleric and liberation theologian
- Fernando Cardenal (1934–2016), Nicaraguan cleric and liberation theologian
- José Cardenal (born 1943), Cuban-American former baseball player
- José Francisco Cardenal (born 1940), Nicaraguan businessman and rebel
- Juan Pablo Cardenal (born 1968), Spanish journalist and sinologist
- Katia Cardenal (born 1963), Nicaraguan singer/songwriter
- Peire Cardenal (1180–1278), Occitan troubadour
- Salvador Cardenal (1960–2010), Nicaraguan singer/songwriter
- Xavier Chamorro Cardenal (1932–2008), Nicaraguan editor of El Nuevo Diario, a Nicaraguan newspaper

== See also ==
- Cardenal Caro (disambiguation)
- Cardenal Quintero Municipality, in the Venezuelan state of Mérida
- Cardinal (disambiguation)
- Cardinale, a surname
