= Cardinale =

Cardinale is a surname. Notable people with the surname include:

- Claudia Cardinale (1938–2025), Tunisian-born Italian actress
- Gerald Cardinale (1934–2021), American politician
- Gerry Cardinale (born 1967), American businessman and investor
- Igino Eugenio Cardinale (1916–1983), Italian Roman Catholic archbishop and diplomat
- Lindsey Cardinale (born 1985), American singer
- Marco Cardinale (born 1973), Italian sports scientist and administrator
- Salvatore Cardinale (born 1948), Italian politician
- Tina Cardinale-Beauchemin (born 1966), American athlete

== See also ==
- Cardenal
- Cardinal (disambiguation)
- Cardinali (disambiguation)
