= Cardenal Caro =

Cardenal Caro may refer to:

- Cardenal Caro Province
- Cardenal Caro Department
- Cardinal José María Caro Rodríguez
- Instituto Cardenal Caro
- Avenida Cardenal José María Caro
- Cardenal Caro metro station

== See also ==
- José María Caro (disambiguation)
