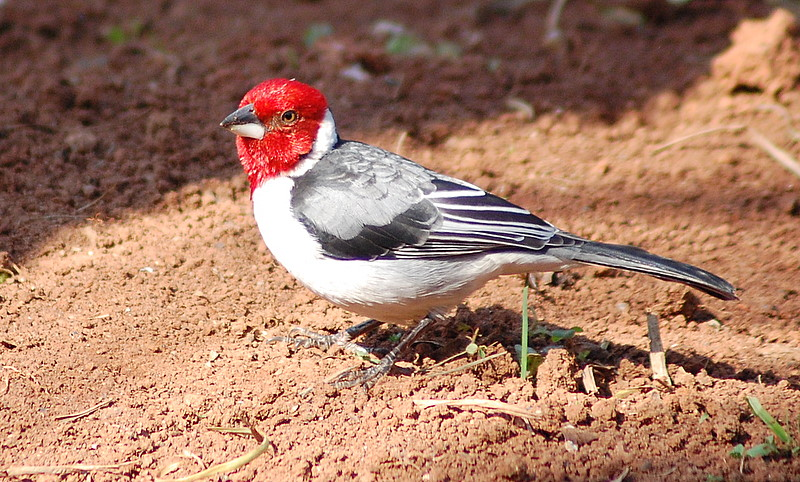

Conservation status
- Least Concern (IUCN 3.1)

Scientific classification
- Kingdom: Animalia
- Phylum: Chordata
- Class: Aves
- Order: Passeriformes
- Family: Thraupidae
- Genus: Paroaria
- Species: P. dominicana

Binomial name
- Paroaria dominicana (Linnaeus, 1758)

Synonyms
- Loxia dominicana Linnaeus, 1758

= Red-cowled cardinal =

Species of bird

The red-cowled cardinal (Paroaria dominicana) is a bird species in the tanager family (Thraupidae). It is not very closely related to the cardinals proper (Cardinalidae).

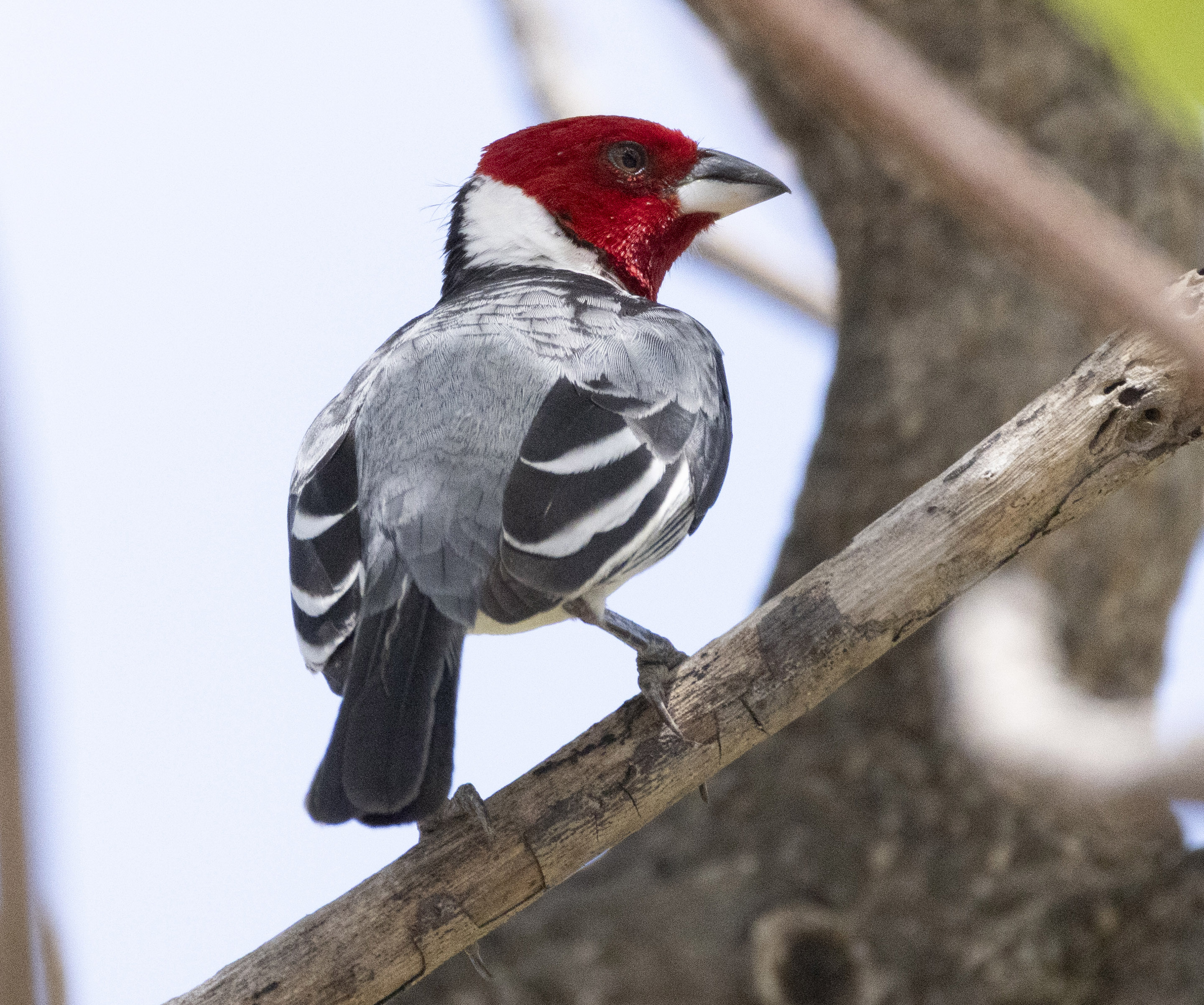
Fortaleza, NE Brazil

It is endemic to Brazil. It occurs in a wide range of dry to semi-humid open to semi-open habitats in north-eastern Brazil, especially the Caatinga region. It has been introduced (probably by means of escaped caged individuals) to Rio de Janeiro and São Paulo, being locally common even in urban areas.

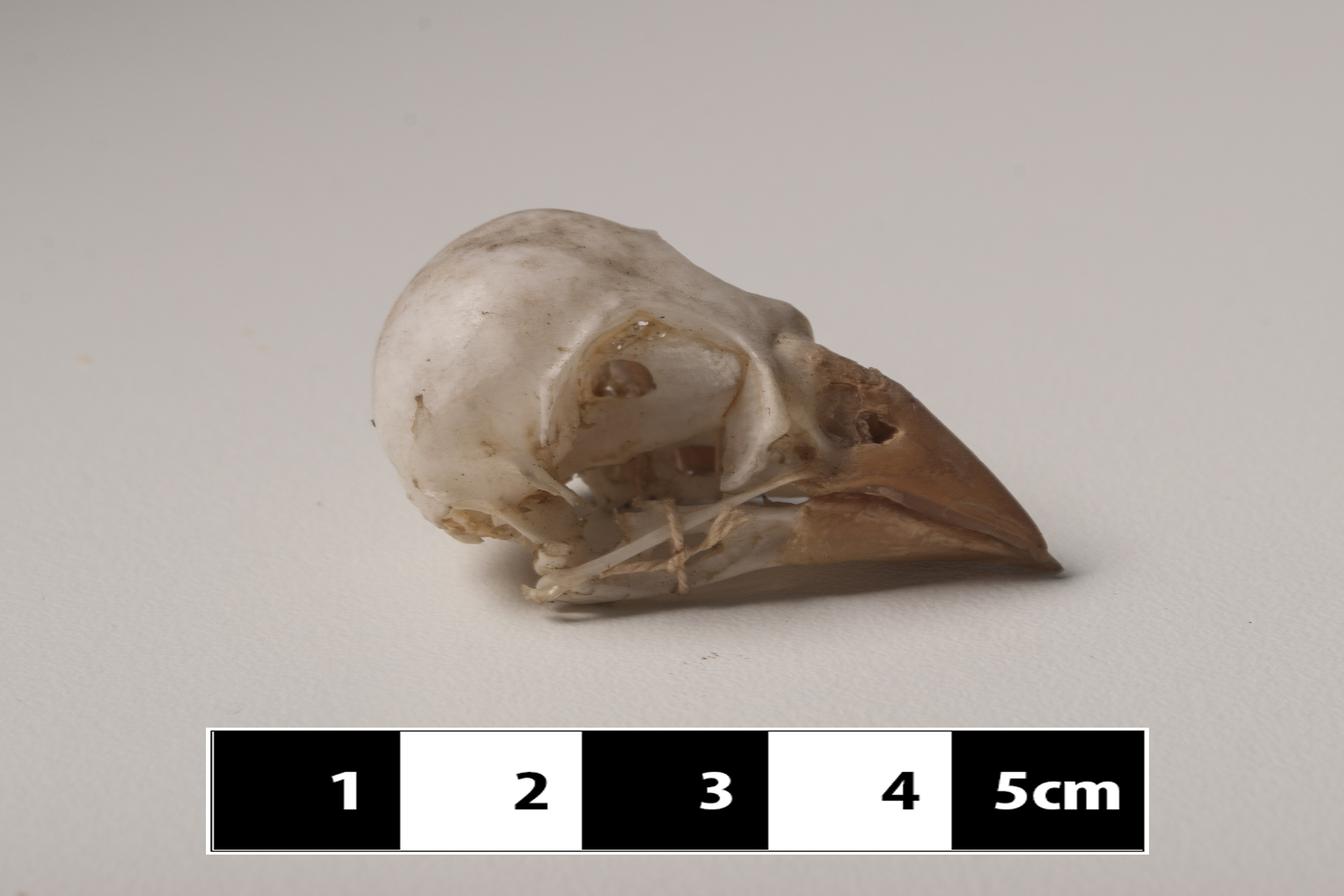
Skull of a red-cowled cardinal

== Taxonomy ==
The red-cowled cardinal was formally described in 1758 by the Swedish naturalist Carl Linnaeus in the tenth edition of his Systema Naturae. He placed it with the crossbills in the genus Loxia and coined the binomial name Loxia dominica. The specific epithet alludes to the black and white habits of members of the Dominican Order. The red-cowled cardinal is now one of six species placed in the genus Paroaria that was introduced by Charles Lucien Bonaparte in 1832. The species is monotypic: no subspecies are recognised.
