= Terzilio Cardinali =

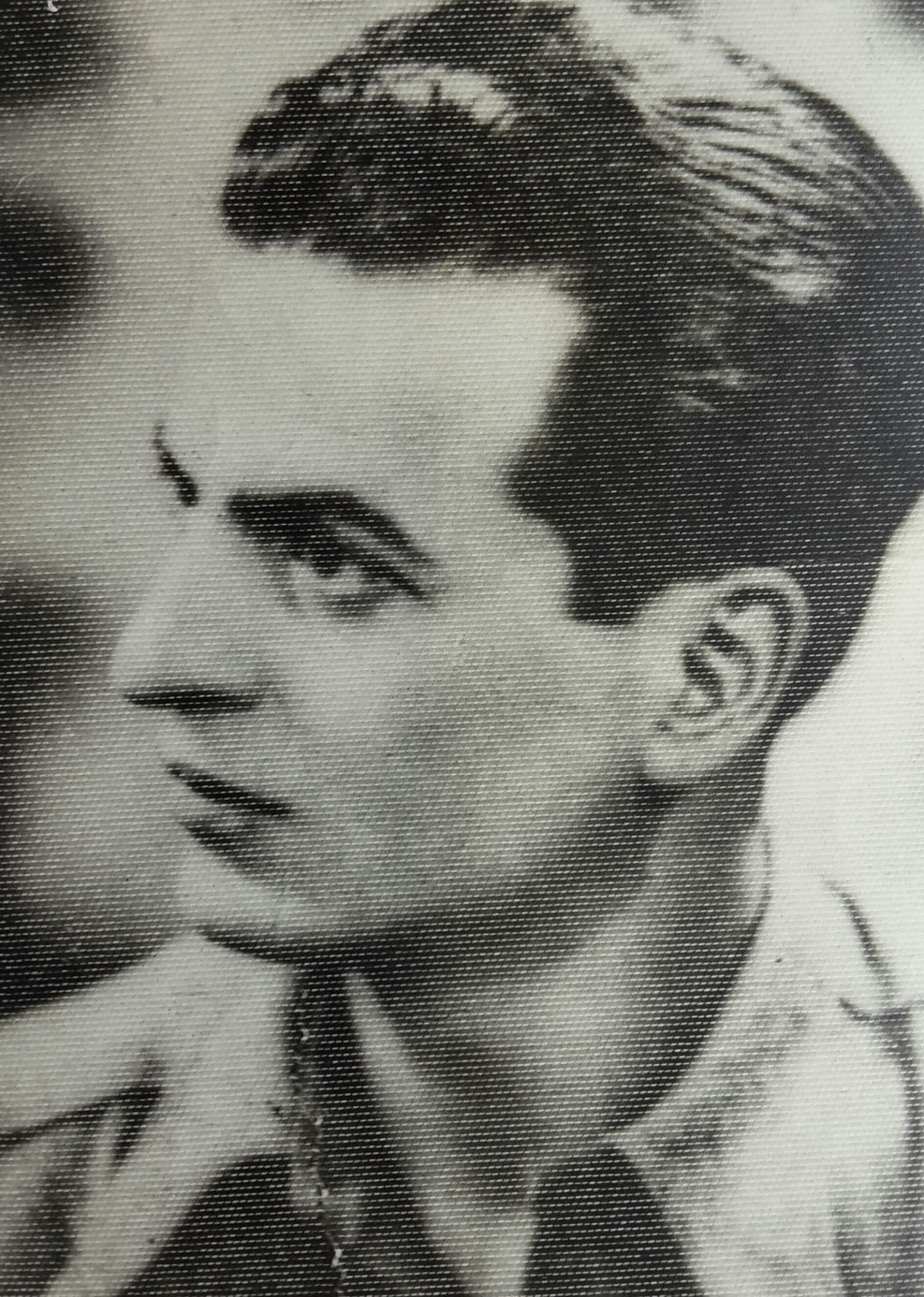
Terzilio Cardinali

Terzilio Cardinali (1913–1944) was an Italian fighter known for his role in Albanian resistance.

He was born on July 25, 1913, in Terranuova Bracciolini. A baker by profession, as an anti-fascist he participated in clashes with Benito Mussolini's Fascist gangs in his youth. When Italy capitulated on September 8, 1943, he was a sergeant in the Arezzo Division. After an appeal by Albanian partisans to continue their war against Germans, Terzilio together with other Italian soldiers formed the Antonio Gramsci Battalion. He was elected by his fellows as the commander of the battalion, a post he maintained up to July 8, 1944, when he was killed among fierce fights in Strelce, Dibër region.

For his deeds he was decorated with Gold Medallion of Honor by Albanian and Italian government. Today a street in Rome is named after him as are several in Albania notably Rruga Tercilio Kardinali in Peshkopi, Albania.
