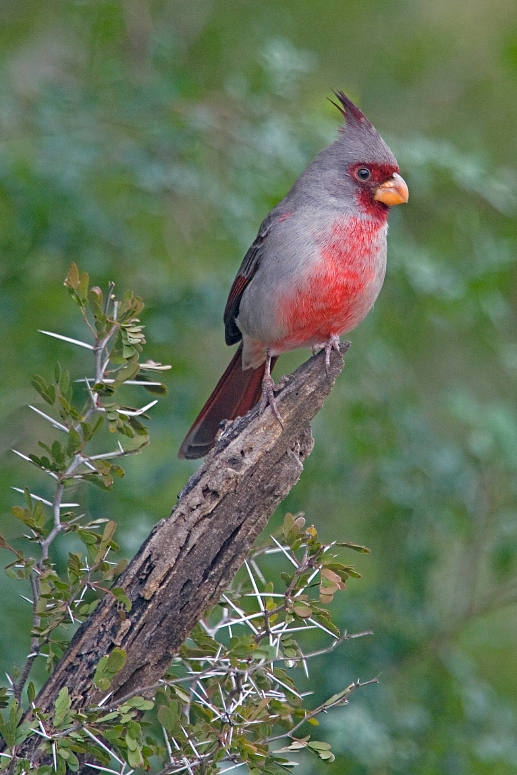
- Male pyrrhuloxia
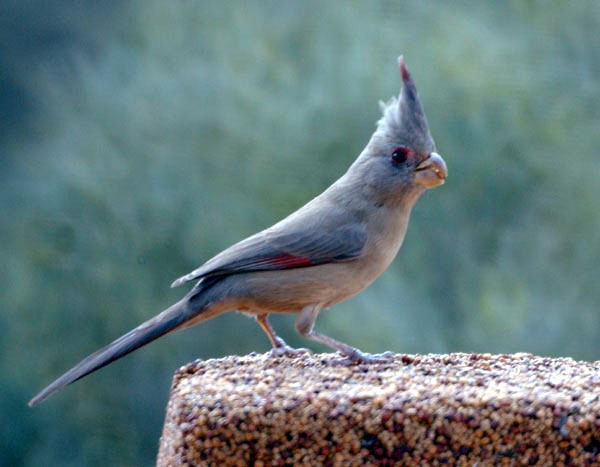
- Female pyrrhuloxia

Scientific classification
- Kingdom: Animalia
- Phylum: Chordata
- Class: Aves
- Order: Passeriformes
- Family: Cardinalidae
- Genus: Cardinalis; Bonaparte, 1838

Type species
- Cardinalis virginianus = Loxia cardinalis Bonaparte, 1838

= Cardinalis =

Genus of birds

Cardinalis is a genus of birds in the family Cardinalidae. There are three species ranging across North America to northern South America.

== Description ==
They are birds between 19 centimetres (7.5 in) and 22 centimetres (8.7 in) in length. Its most distinctive characteristics are the presence of a conspicuous crest and a thick and strong conical bill. There is sexual dimorphism; males have a greater amount of red in their plumage, and females have only some tints, with a predominance of gray. Its striking red plumage is likened to a Catholic senior priest's garments, and their genus is named after the Latin word for them, cardinalis. Immature individuals are similar in appearance to females.

== Species ==
Genus Cardinalis – Bonaparte, 1838 – three species
Common name	Scientific name and subspecies	Range	Size and ecology	IUCN status and estimated population
Northern cardinal Male Female	Cardinalis cardinalis (Linnaeus, 1758) Nineteen subspecies: C. c. cardinalis (Linnaeus, 1758); C. c. affinis Nelson, 1899; C. c. canicaudus Chapman, 1891; C. c. carneus (Lesson, 1842); C. c. clintoni (Banks, 1963); C. c. coccineus Ridgway, 1873; C. c. flammiger J.L. Peters, 1913; C. c. floridanus Ridgway, 1896; C. c. igneus S.F. Baird, 1860; C. c. littoralis Nelson, 1897; C. c. magnirostris Bangs, 1903; C. c. mariae Nelson, 1898; C. c. phillipsi Parkes, 1997; C. c. saturatus Ridgway, 1885; C. c. seftoni (Huey, 1940); C. c. sinaloensis Nelson, 1899; C. c. superbus Ridgway, 1885; C. c. townsendi (van Rossem, 1932); C. c. yucatanicus Ridgway, 1887	United States from Maine to Texas and in Canada in the provinces of Ontario, Quebec, New Brunswick and Nova Scotia. Its range extends west to the U.S.–Mexico border and south through Mexico to the Isthmus of Tehuantepec, northern Guatemala, and northern Belize	Size: Habitat: Diet:	LC
Pyrrhuloxia (a.k.a. Desert cardinal) Male Female	Cardinalis sinuatus Bonaparte, 1838	U.S. states of Arizona, New Mexico, and Texas and woodland edges in Mexico	Size: Habitat: Diet:	LC
Vermilion cardinal Male Female	Cardinalis phoeniceus Bonaparte, 1838	Colombia and Venezuela	Size: Habitat: Diet:	LC

=== Phylogeny ===
Cladogram based on analysis by Tilston Smith and Klicka published in 2013.

- Cardinalis
  - - C. phoeniceus
  - - C.sinuatus
    - C.cardinalis
