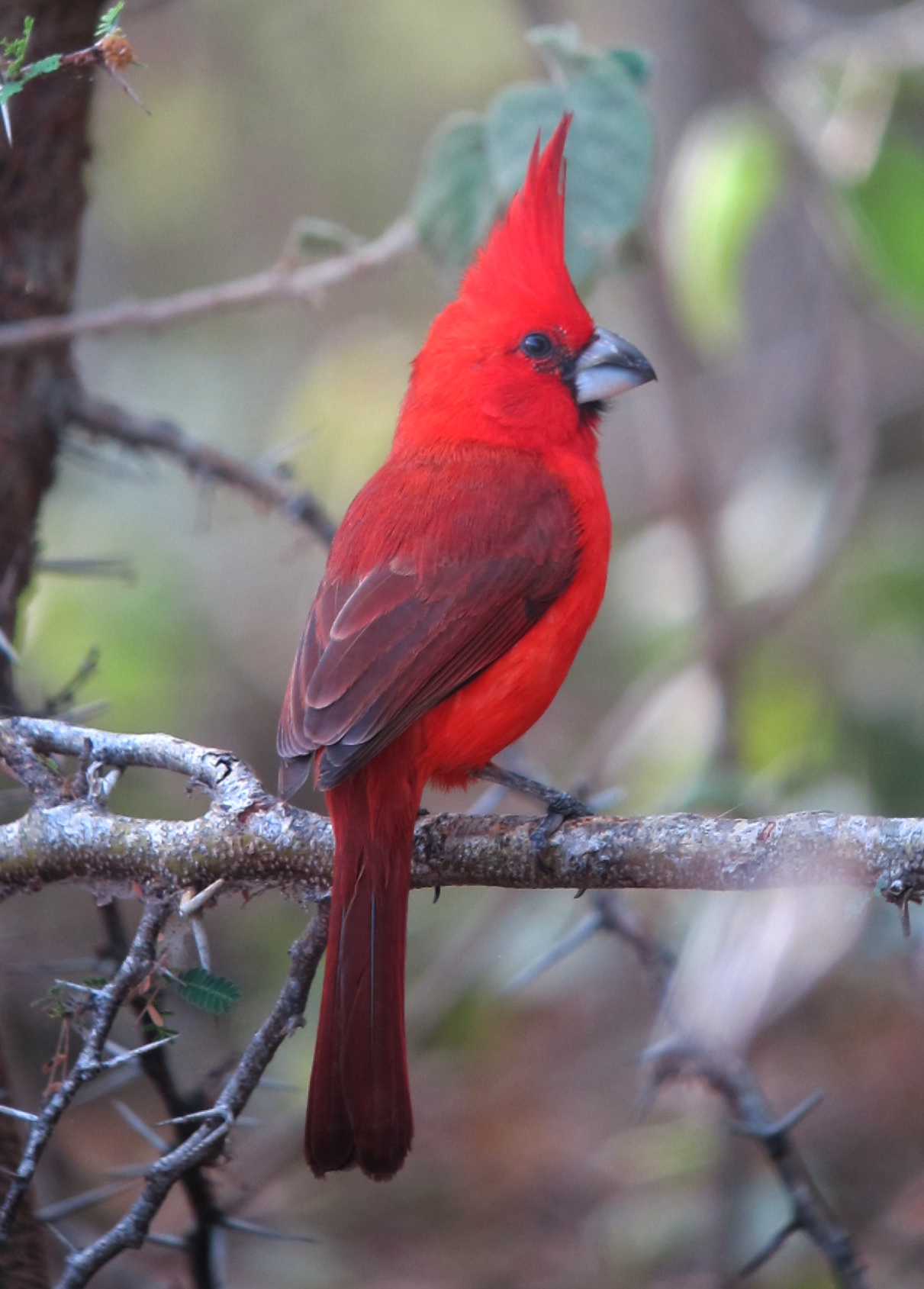
- Male
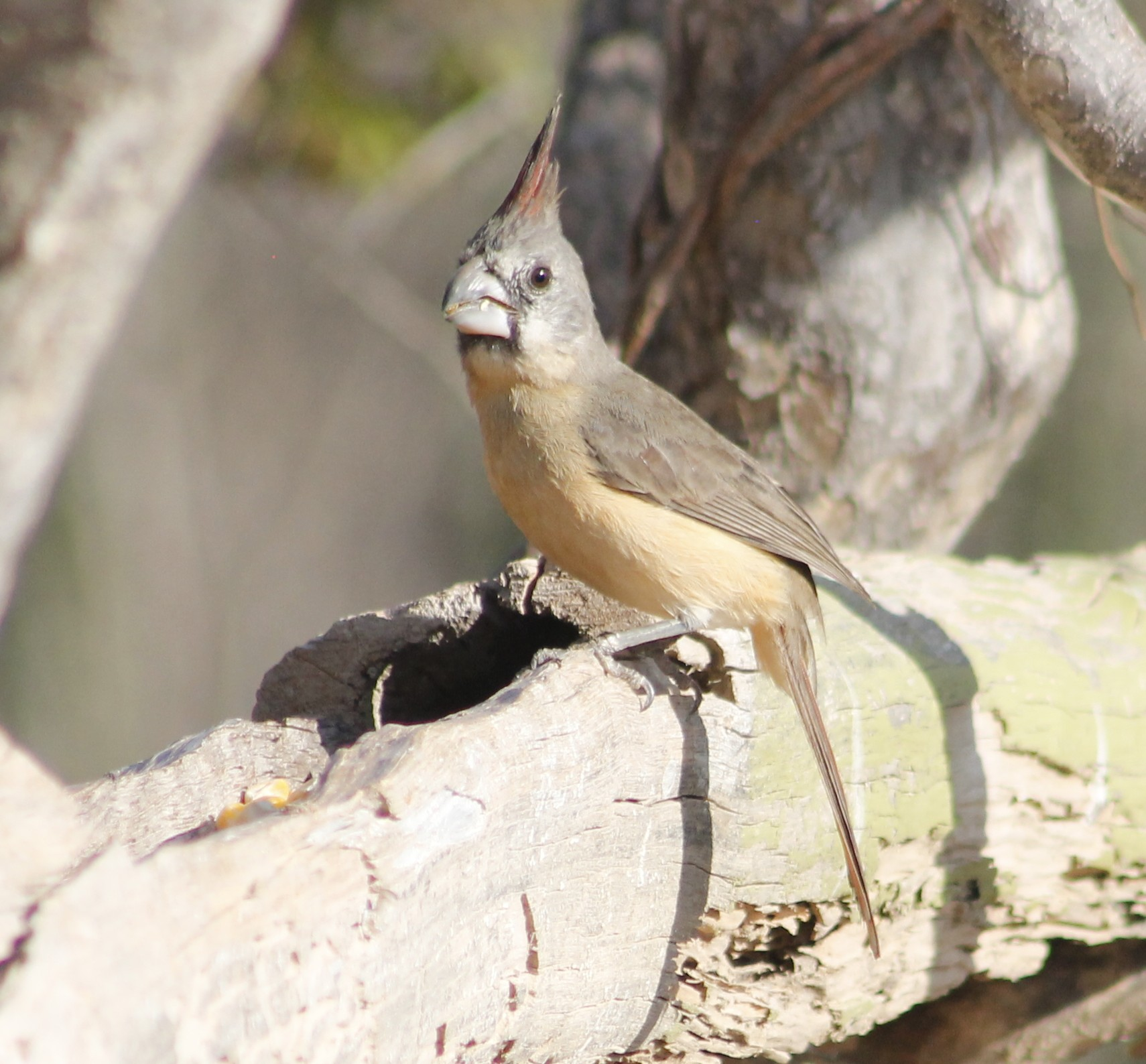
- Female

Conservation status
- Least Concern (IUCN 3.1)

Scientific classification
- Kingdom: Animalia
- Phylum: Chordata
- Class: Aves
- Order: Passeriformes
- Family: Cardinalidae
- Genus: Cardinalis
- Species: C. phoeniceus

Binomial name
- Cardinalis phoeniceus Bonaparte, 1838

Synonyms
- Approximate distribution map Year-round

= Vermilion cardinal =

Species of bird

The vermilion cardinal (Cardinalis phoeniceus) is a species of bird in the family Cardinalidae, the cardinals or cardinal grosbeaks. It is found in Colombia and Venezuela.

== Taxonomy and systematics ==
The vermilion cardinal is monotypic. It and the other species of genus Cardinalis were at one time placed in genera Richmondena and Pyrrhuloxia. The vermilion cardinal is more closely related to the pyrrhuloxia (C. sinuatus) than to the northern cardinal (C. cardinalis).

== Description ==
The vermilion cardinal is 19 cm (7.5 in) long. Both sexes have long feathers on the crown that are typically erect. The male is almost entirely red, though it varies from very bright to somewhat dusky. It has a narrow black band around the lower part of its heavy gray bill. The female's crown is gray and the elongated feathers red. The rest of the head is brownish gray with white patches near the bill. The upperparts are grayish brown warming to brown on the rump and the underparts are buffy cinnamon. The juvenile is similar to the female but with more, and richer, brown.

== Distribution and habitat ==
The vermilion cardinal is found in two disjunct areas. One spans from the Guajira Peninsula of northeastern Colombia into northern Venezuela as far as Lara state. The other is further east in Venezuela, from Anzoátegui state east to Sucre state, including Margarita Island. It inhabits semi-arid scrublands characterized by cactus and spiny legumes. It generally is found from sea level to 300 m (980 ft) but has been recorded as high as 700 m (2,300 ft) in Lara.

== Behavior ==
=== Feeding ===
The vermilion cardinal forages singly, in pairs, or in small groups through low vegetation. Its diet includes invertebrates, fleshy fruits, and seeds.

=== Breeding ===
Six vermilion cardinal nests have been described, all from Margarita Island. They were open cups placed in a cactus or a bush. The nesting season spanned June to early August. Four of the nests had three eggs and one had four. Only the female incubates the eggs and broods the nestlings, but both sexes feed the young.

=== Vocalization ===
The vermilion cardinal's song is "a pleasant...'cheer o-weet-toweet toweet toweet'". Its call is a "chip".

== Status ==
The IUCN has assessed the vermilion cardinal as being of Least Concern.Though it has a restricted range, it appears to be common in much of it. However, capture for the pet trade in some locations "undoubtedly has a significant negative effect on populations."
