= Michael Cardinali =

Italian professional football player

Personal information
- Date of birth: January 14, 1990 (age 36)
- Place of birth: Civitanova Marche, Italy.
- Position: Midfielder

Senior career*
Years	Team	Apps	(Gls)
–2007	Giulianova	11	(0)
2007–2011	Fiorentina	0	(0)
2009–2011	→ Chieti (loan)	53	(0)
2011–2013	Chieti	35	(0)
2013–XXXX	Montegiorgio Calcio		
2016	Castelfidardo		
- * Club domestic league appearances and goals

Michael Cardinali (born January 14, 1990) is an Italian professional football player.

He made his debut on the professional level in the 2006/07 season for the Serie C1 team Giulianova Calcio.
