= Cardinal, Virginia =

Unincorporated community in Virginia, United States

- Unincorporated community
- Location within Virginia Location within the United States
- Coordinates: 37°25′13″N 76°22′54″W
- Country: United States
- State: Virginia
- County: Mathews
- Elevation: 13 ft (4.0 m)
- Time zone: UTC-5 (Eastern (EST))
  - Summer (DST): UTC-4 (EDT)
- ZIP code: 23025
- Area code: 804
- GNIS feature ID: 1499213

Cardinal is an unincorporated community in Mathews County, Virginia, United States. Cardinal is 3.5 miles (5.6 km) west-southwest of Mathews. Cardinal has a post office.
