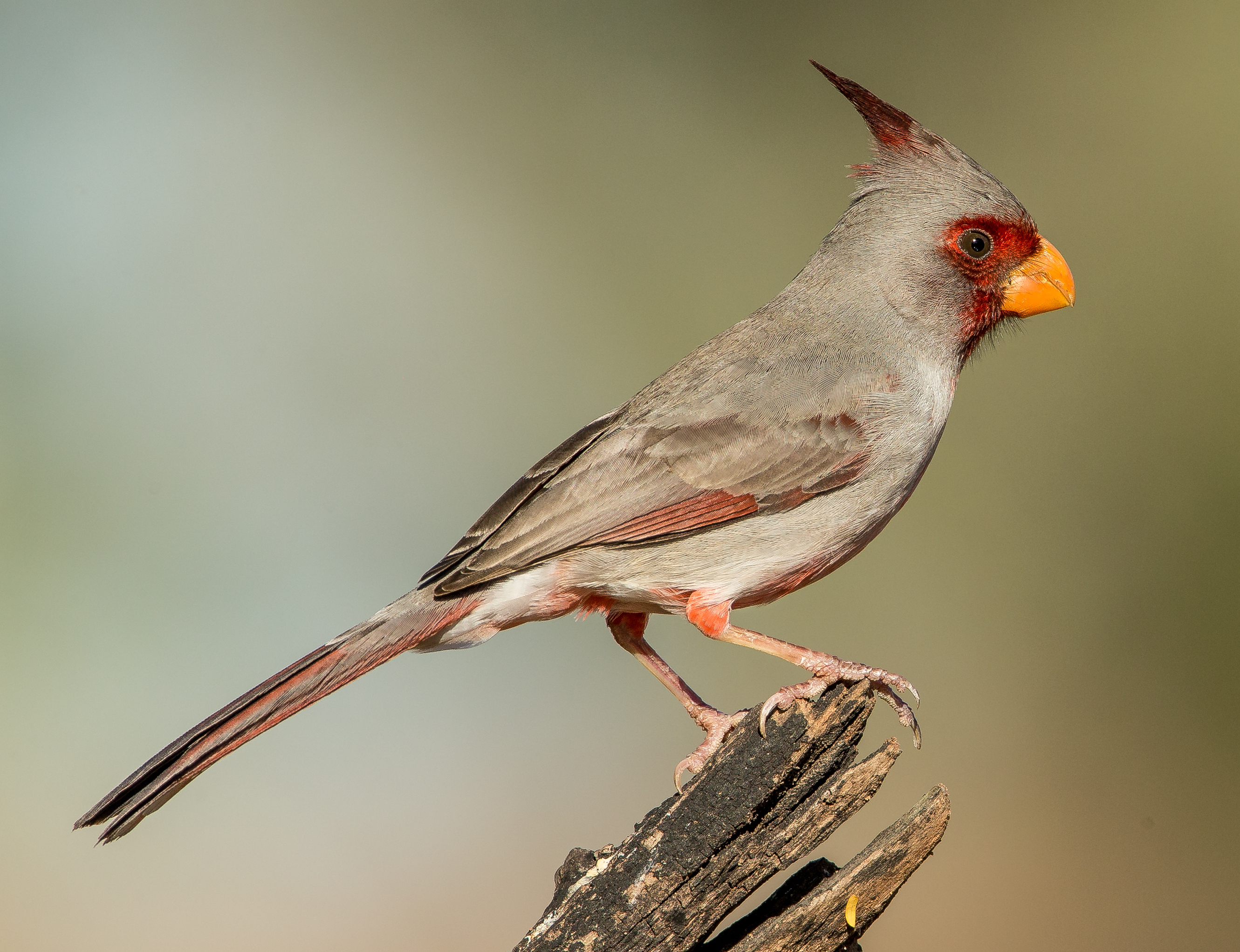
- Male
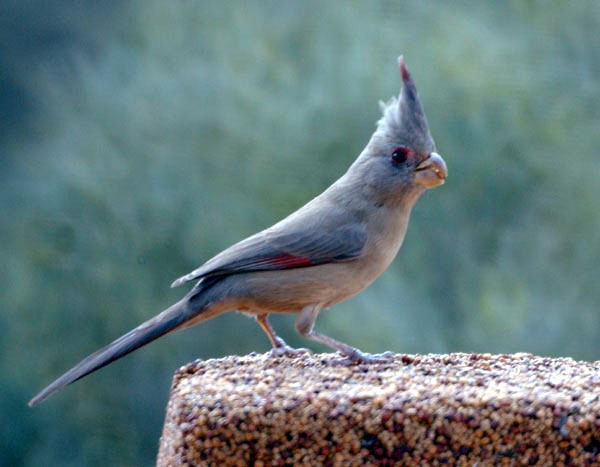
- Female

Conservation status
- Least Concern (IUCN 3.1)

Scientific classification
- Kingdom: Animalia
- Phylum: Chordata
- Class: Aves
- Order: Passeriformes
- Family: Cardinalidae
- Genus: Cardinalis
- Species: C. sinuatus

Binomial name
- Cardinalis sinuatus Bonaparte, 1838

Synonyms
- Pyrrhuloxia sinuatus

= Pyrrhuloxia =

Species of bird

The pyrrhuloxia /ˌpɪrəˈlɒksiə/ or desert cardinal (Cardinalis sinuatus) is a medium-sized North American songbird found in the American southwest and northern Mexico. This distinctive species with a short, stout bill, red crest, and red wings closely resembles the northern cardinal and the vermilion cardinal, which are in the same genus.

== Taxonomy ==
The desert cardinal is one of three birds in the genus Cardinalis in the family Cardinalidae, a group of passerine birds found in North and South America.

Its name of pyrrhuloxia was suggested as a new genus by ornithologist Charles Lucien Bonaparte. He conceived it as portmanteau of the bullfinch genus Pyrrhula and the crossbill genus Loxia as he imagined the bird was an intermediate between the two. The common name, desert cardinal, refers to it inhabiting the southwest, and often arid regions, of the North American continent.

== Description ==
The desert cardinal is a medium-sized song bird; the length for both sexes is about 8.3 in (21 cm), while the typical weight is 0.8–1.5 oz (24–43 g).

The most obvious differences between the male desert cardinal and the northern cardinal are in their coloring. The desert cardinal is predominantly brownish-gray with a red breast, a red mask, and a yellow, parrot-like bill that is stout and rounded. The females of the two species resemble each other much more closely, but the shapes of their bills are diagnostic. The songs of the two species are identical, though the pyrrhuloxia's is not quite as loud. This cardinal retains the distinctive long, pointed, red crest present in all species.

== Distribution and habitat ==
The pyrrhuloxia is a year-round resident of desert scrub and mesquite thickets, in the U.S. states of Arizona, New Mexico, and Texas and woodland edges in Mexico. It occupies the southwestern half of Texas, roughly the southern third of New Mexico, and southeastern region of Arizona. Its range includes areas from the west to east coast of Mexico north of the Sierra Madre del Sur, Trans-Mexican Volcanic Belt, and Isthmus of Tehuantepec, while excluding the Sierra Madre Occidental. An individual of the species has reportedly been seen as far away from its dominant range as Costa Mesa, California, in Orange County.

This cardinal is relatively nonmigratory, though it may occasionally stray slightly north of its usual range. The pyrrhuloxia prefers habitat along stream beds. In areas where the range of the pyrrhuloxia and northern cardinal overlap, hybridization may occur between them.

== Ecology ==
In breeding season, songs are used to establish and defend territories. One song has a sharp, clear, "wha-cheer, wha-cheer", while another is characteristic of a metallic "quink". Females also sing, but they use softer and duller notes. A short "cheep" or "chip" is a regular contact call given by both sexes while foraging.

=== Diet ===
The pyrrhuloxia's diet consists of seeds, fruits, and insects. While foraging, the desert cardinal snatches insects from trees and picks seeds predominantly from the stalks of grasses and similar plants. It also seeks out cactus fruit for consumption. This bird is a benefit to cotton fields, as it assists in eating populations of cotton worms and weevils. This species of cardinal also visits bird feeders and in the winter forages in huge flocks, sometimes numbering in the thousands.

=== Reproduction ===
The breeding season for this cardinal usually begins in mid-March, ending in mid-August. As the breeding season approaches, territories are established and defended by the male. The male defends the territory by chasing away intruders and from a good vantage point, singing. Where both the desert and northern cardinal breeding territories overlap, no interspecific conflicts have been observed.

The desert cardinal places its nest in dense shrub, often concealed. The nest is small and forms a bowl or cup-like shape made up of grass, twigs, or bits of tree bark. Clutches of two to four eggs are most common, while the eggs are whitish with specks of green or gray. During an incubation period of two weeks, the male brings food to the female. At hatching, the chicks are helpless and have a bright yellow bill with red lining around the mouth. The chicks fledge around 10 days old, while both the male and female tend to the young. The young bird can wait for up to a month before fully fledging, becoming independent and feeding in large flocks. During this period, the bird achieves complete growth.

== Relationship with humans ==
As large areas of the pyrrhuloxia's habitat in its northern range have been lost to humans, unlike with the northern cardinal, the former's populations appear to be in a slight decline.

== Photo gallery ==
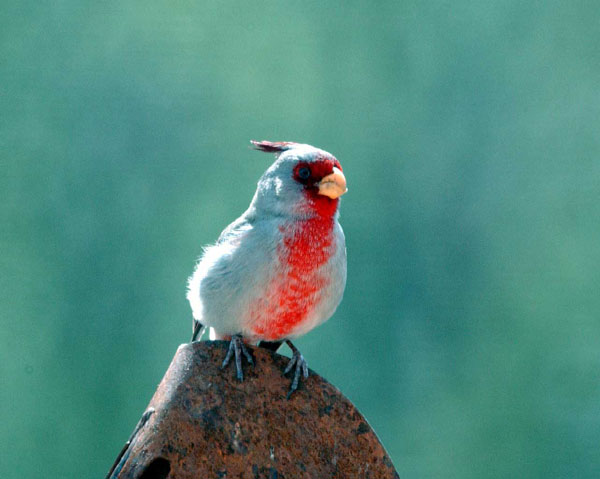
Male in Tucson, Arizona

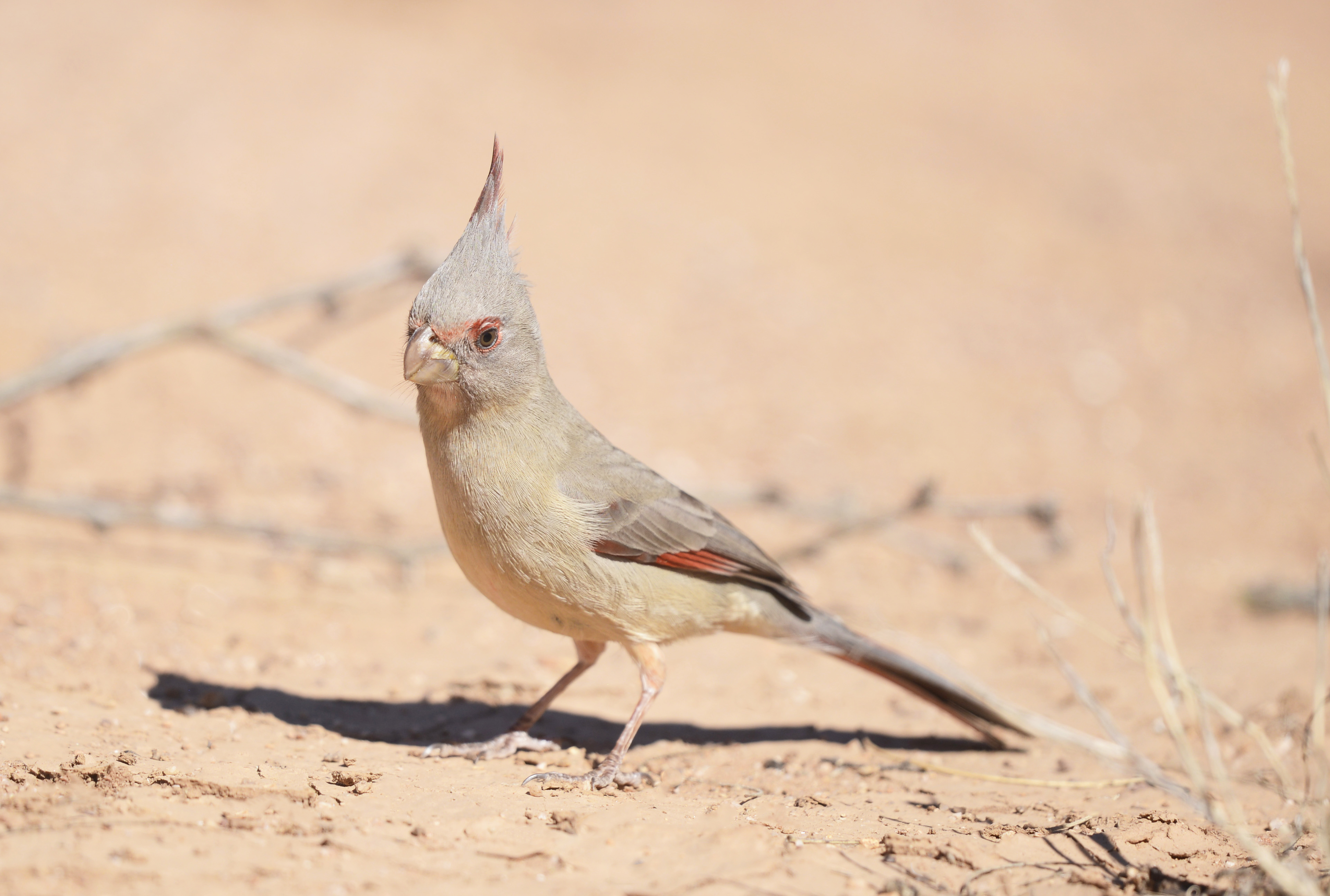
Female in southern Arizona

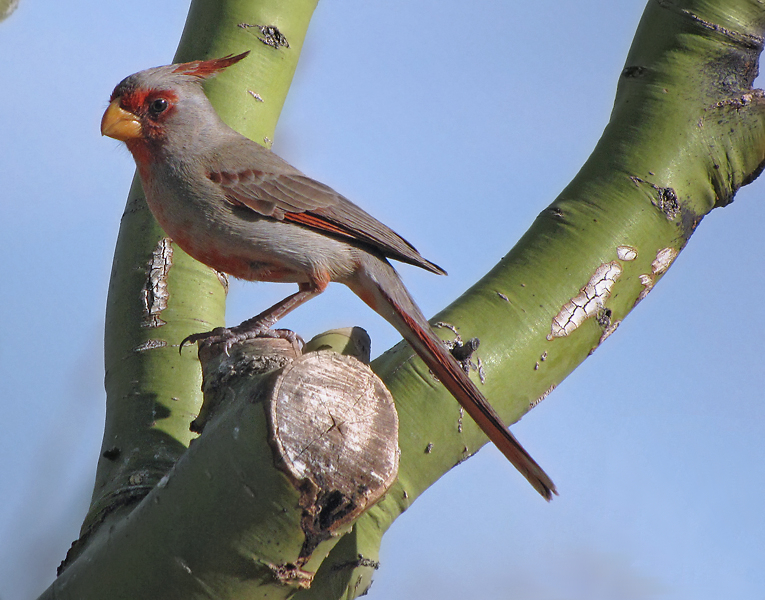
Male in Tucson

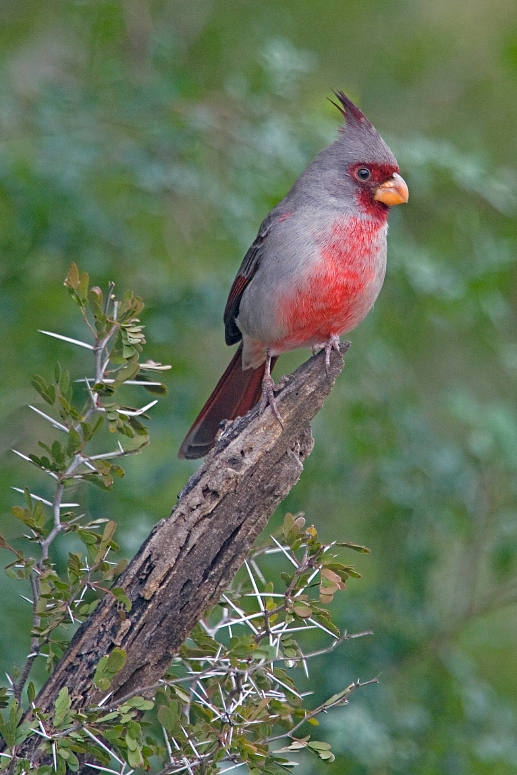
Male in Roma, Texas

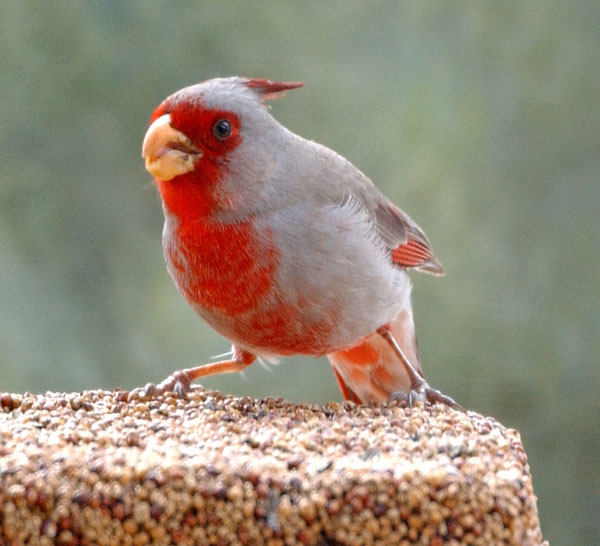
Feeding male

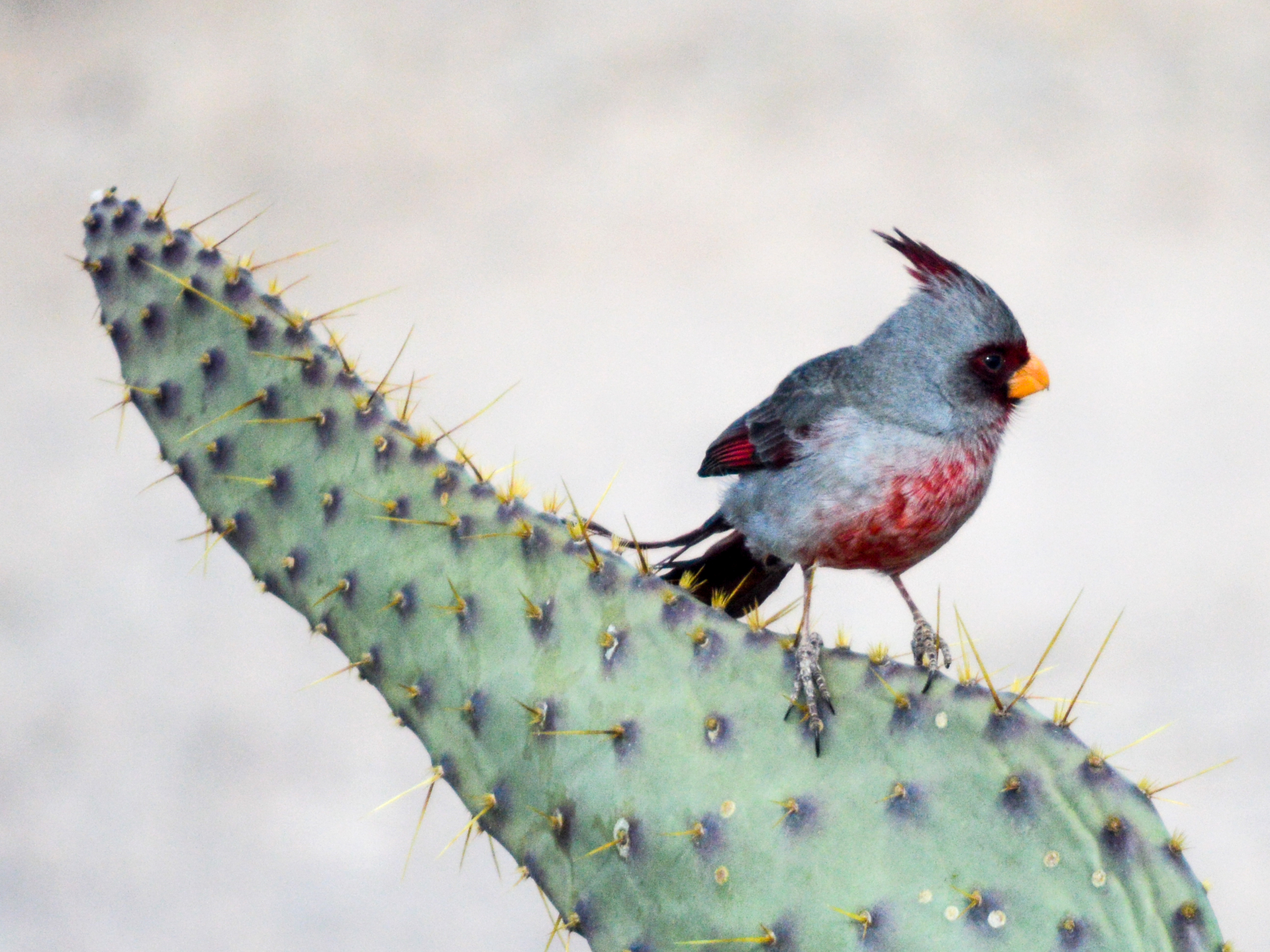
Male in Columbus, New Mexico
