= Marco Cardinale =

Dr. Marco Cardinale (born in Formia, Italy) is the Executive Director of Research and Scientific Support at Aspetar in Qatar. Before joining Aspetar he was the Head of Sports Physiology at Aspire Academy in Qatar. He was the former Head of Sports Science and Research of the British Olympic Association. His main research work has been on the use of vibration as an exercise intervention, hormonal responses to exercise and neuromuscular adaptations to strength training. Was Head of Science for Team GB at the Beijing 2008, Vancouver 2010 and London 2012 Olympics.

In November 2007 Dr Cardinale was appointed by Sir Clive Woodward as the lead physiologist of the Elite Performance Programme of the British Olympic Association and created with him the Olympic Coaching Programme.

He is an Honorary Associate Professor at University College London, and Visiting Professor at Northumbria University, Newcastle. He holds a patent on an exercise device and is the Editor of Strength and Conditioning: Biological Principles and Practical Applications, published by Wiley-Blackwell.
