= José María Caro =

José María Caro is the name of:

People:

- José María Caro Martínez (1830–1916), Mayor of Pichilemu, Chile; and his son
- José María Caro Rodríguez (1866–1958), Chilean Cardinal

Places:

- Población José María Caro, a slum in Santiago, Chile named after the cardinal

Other:

- José María Caro Criminal Investigation Brigade (Brigada de Investigación Criminal José María Caro) of the Investigations Police of Chile
