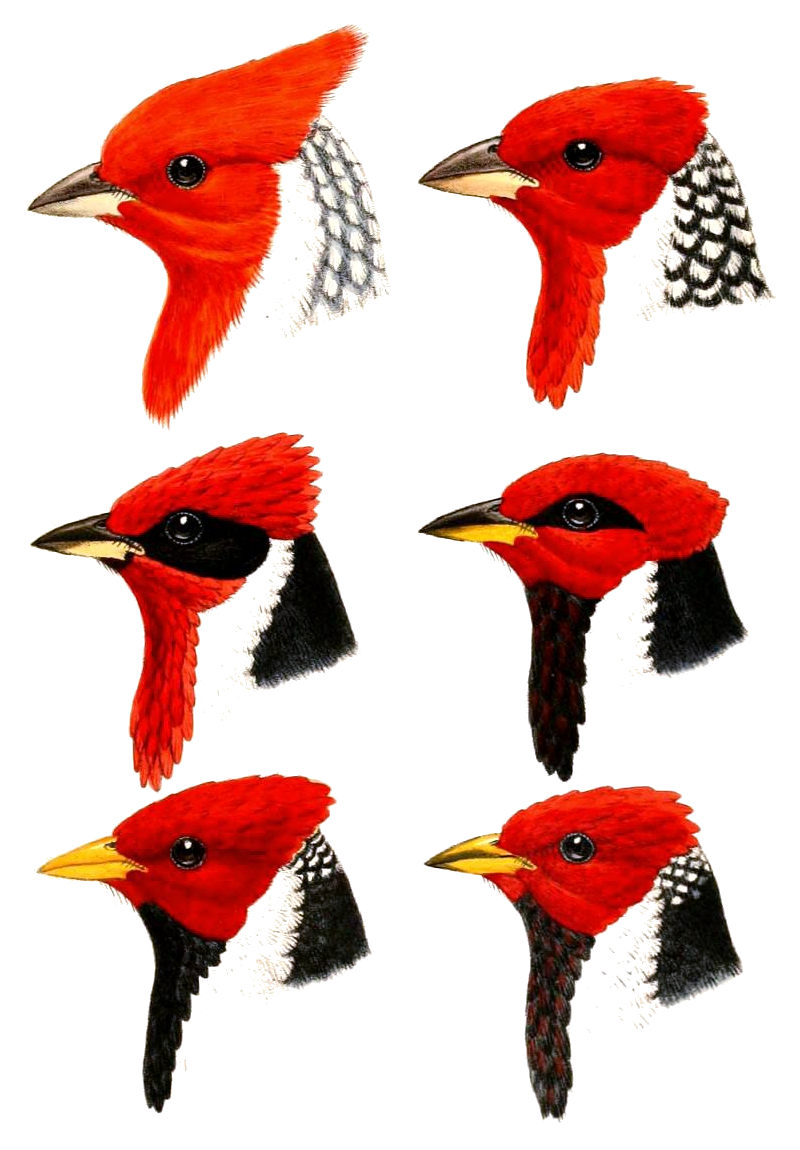
- Top left: Paroaria coronata Top right: Paroaria dominicana Left center: Paroaria nigrogenis Right center: Paroaria gularis gularis Bottom left: Paroaria capitata Bottom right: Paroaria g. cervicalis
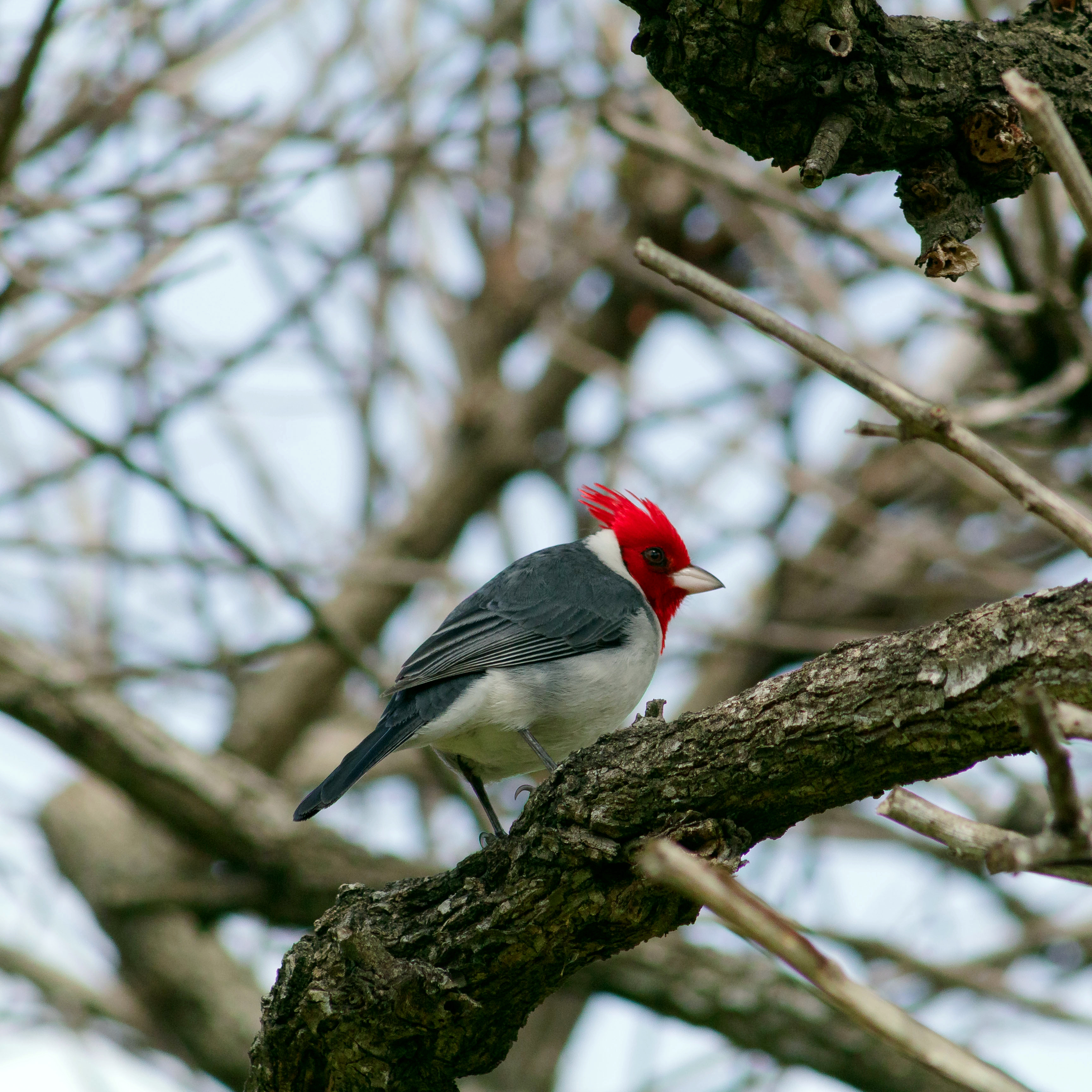
- Paroaria coronata in Buenos Aires, Argentina

Scientific classification
- Kingdom: Animalia
- Phylum: Chordata
- Class: Aves
- Order: Passeriformes
- Family: Thraupidae
- Genus: Paroaria; Bonaparte, 1832

Type species
- Fringilla cucullata =Loxia coronata Vieillot

Species
- See text

= Paroaria =

Genus of birds

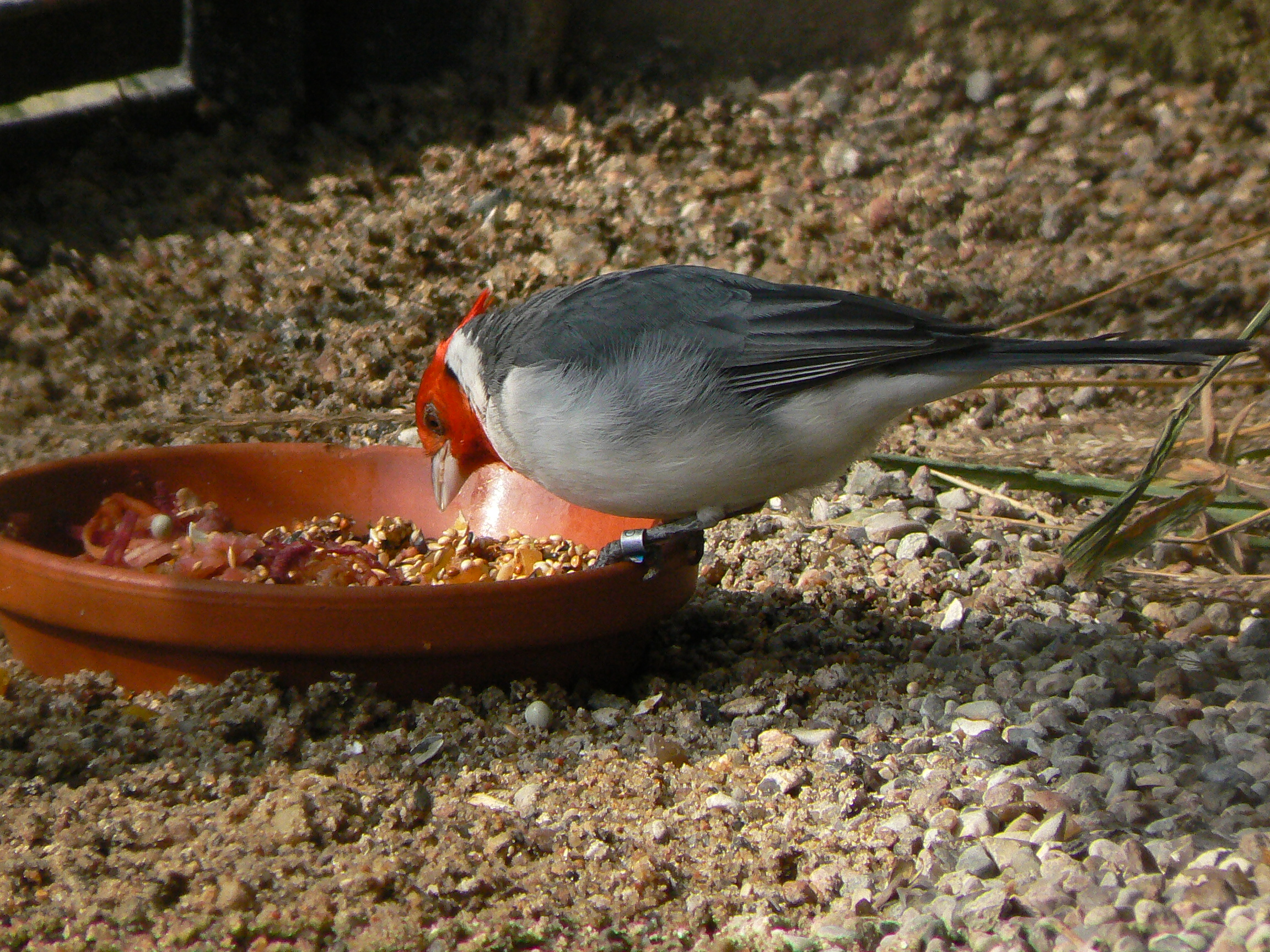
P. coronata showing typical color pattern of genus

Paroaria, the red-headed cardinals or cardinal-tanagers (as they are not close to the Cardinalidae), are a genus of tanagers. They were until recently placed in the family Emberizidae.

Five or six species are placed here. They are all very similar-looking birds, with heads resembling that of a northern cardinal (Cardinalis cardinalis, a true member of the Cardinalidae), though they are somewhat more slender (in particular their rather tanager-like bill).

Their coloration is also typical; they are quite unlike any Cardinalidae, though they bear a passing resemblance to adult male rose-breasted grosbeak (Pheucticus ludovicianus). Like these, they are white below and dark above (grey to blackish in the case of Paroaria). But unlike P. ludovicianus, they have no conspicuous pattern except for the head, which has large amounts of bright red; it may be predominantly so or patterned red-and-black. Almost all Paroaria have at least a short crest. The bill is yellowish below or in its entirety.

== Taxonomy and species list ==
The genus Paroaria was introduced in 1832 by the French naturalist Charles Lucien Bonaparte with the red-crested cardinal as the type species. The name is from Tiéguacú paroára, a name for a small yellow, red and grey bird in the extinct Tupi language.

The genus contains the following six species:

Genus Paroaria – Bonaparte, 1832 – six species
Common name	Scientific name and subspecies	Range	Size and ecology	IUCN status and estimated population
Red-crested cardinal Male Female	Paroaria coronata (Miller, JF, 1776)	Northern Argentina, Bolivia, Paraguay, Uruguay, Brazil's Rio Grande do Sul and southern part of the Pantanal. Introduced to the Hawaiian Islands.	Size: Habitat: Diet:	LC
Red-cowled cardinal	Paroaria dominicana (Linnaeus, 1758)	Brazil.	Size: Habitat: Diet:	LC
Red-capped cardinal	Paroaria gularis (Linnaeus, 1766) Two subspecies: P. g. gularis (Linnaeus, 1766); P. g. cervicalis Sclater, PL, 1862	Guianas, Venezuela, eastern Colombia, eastern Ecuador, eastern Peru, northern and eastern Bolivia and the Amazon basin in Brazil.	Size: Habitat: Diet:	LC
Masked cardinal	Paroaria nigrogenis (Lafresnaye, 1846)	Trinidad, far north-eastern Colombia and northern Venezuela	Size: Habitat: Diet:	LC
Crimson-fronted cardinal	Paroaria baeri Hellmayr, 1907	Brazil	Size: Habitat: Diet:	LC
Yellow-billed cardinal	Paroaria capitata (d'Orbigny & Lafresnaye, 1837)	Brazil, Paraguay, Bolivia, Uruguay, and northern Argentina. Introduced to the Hawaiian islands.	Size: Habitat: Diet:	LC
