= NGC 1528 =

Open cluster in the constellation Perseus

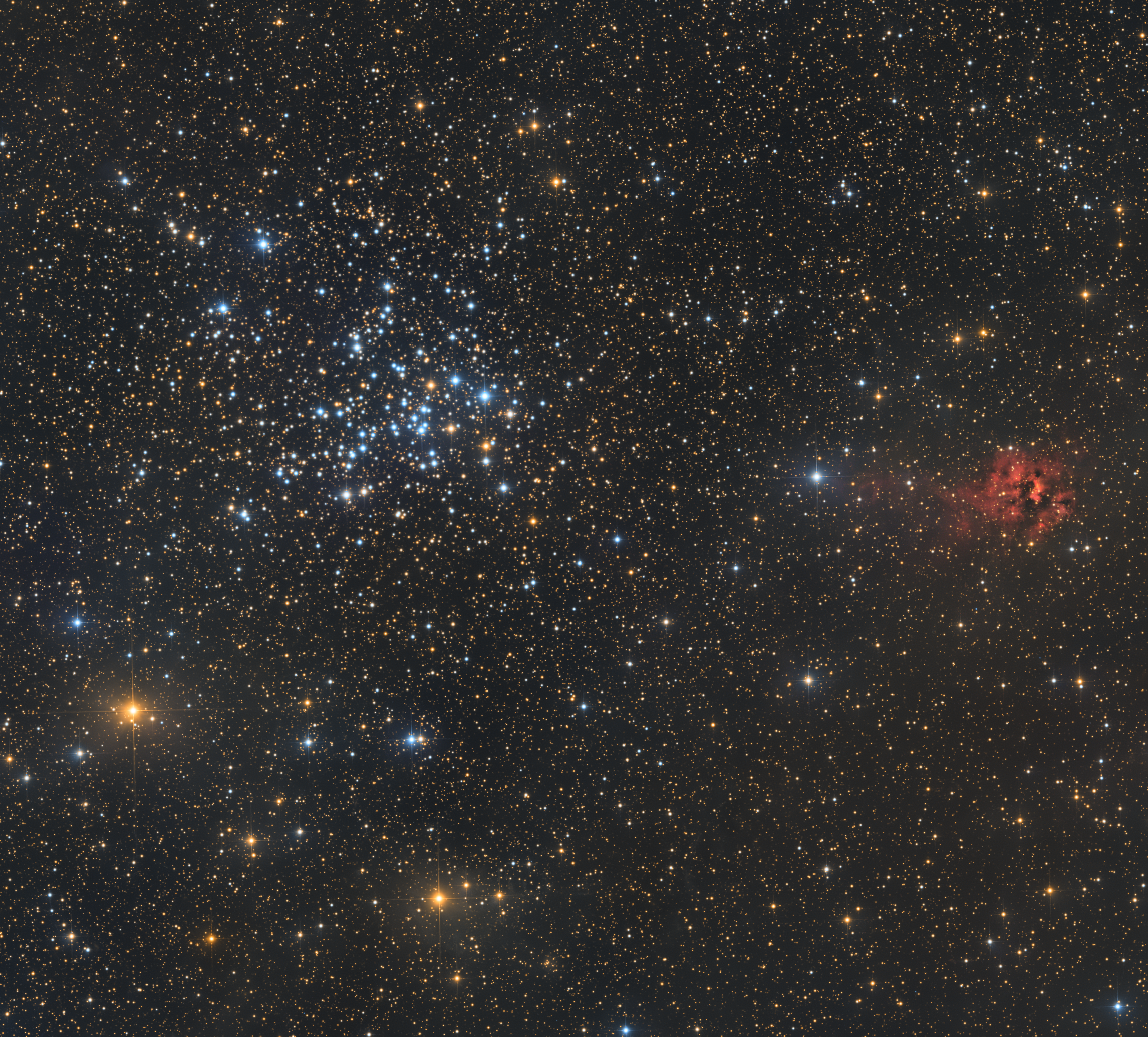
- NGC 1528 (open cluster on the left) and nearby SH2-209 (nebula on the right)

Observation data (J2000 epoch)
- Right ascension: 04^{h} 15^{m} 30.72^{s}
- Declination: +51° 13′ 04.8″
- Distance: 3,110 ± 500 ly (954 ± 154 pc)
- Apparent magnitude (V): 6.4
- Apparent dimensions (V): 18′

Physical characteristics
- Estimated age: 110 Ma
- Other designations: NGC 1528, Cr 47

Associations
- Constellation: Perseus

NGC 1528 is an open cluster of stars in the northern constellation of Perseus. It was discovered by the German-British astronomer William Herschel in 1790. This cluster is located in the north-eastern part of the constellation, just under 3 degrees north of μ Persei. Less than 1.5° to the southeast is the open cluster NGC 1545 (m = 6.2). NGC 1528 is clearly visible with 10x50 binoculars. 165 stars are recognised as members of NGC 1528, the brightest of which has apparent magnitude 8.7.

Together with NGC 1545, it forms the M&M Double Cluster.

== See also ==
- List of NGC objects (1001–2000)
