= The Cardinal (1901 play) =

Play by Louis N. Parker

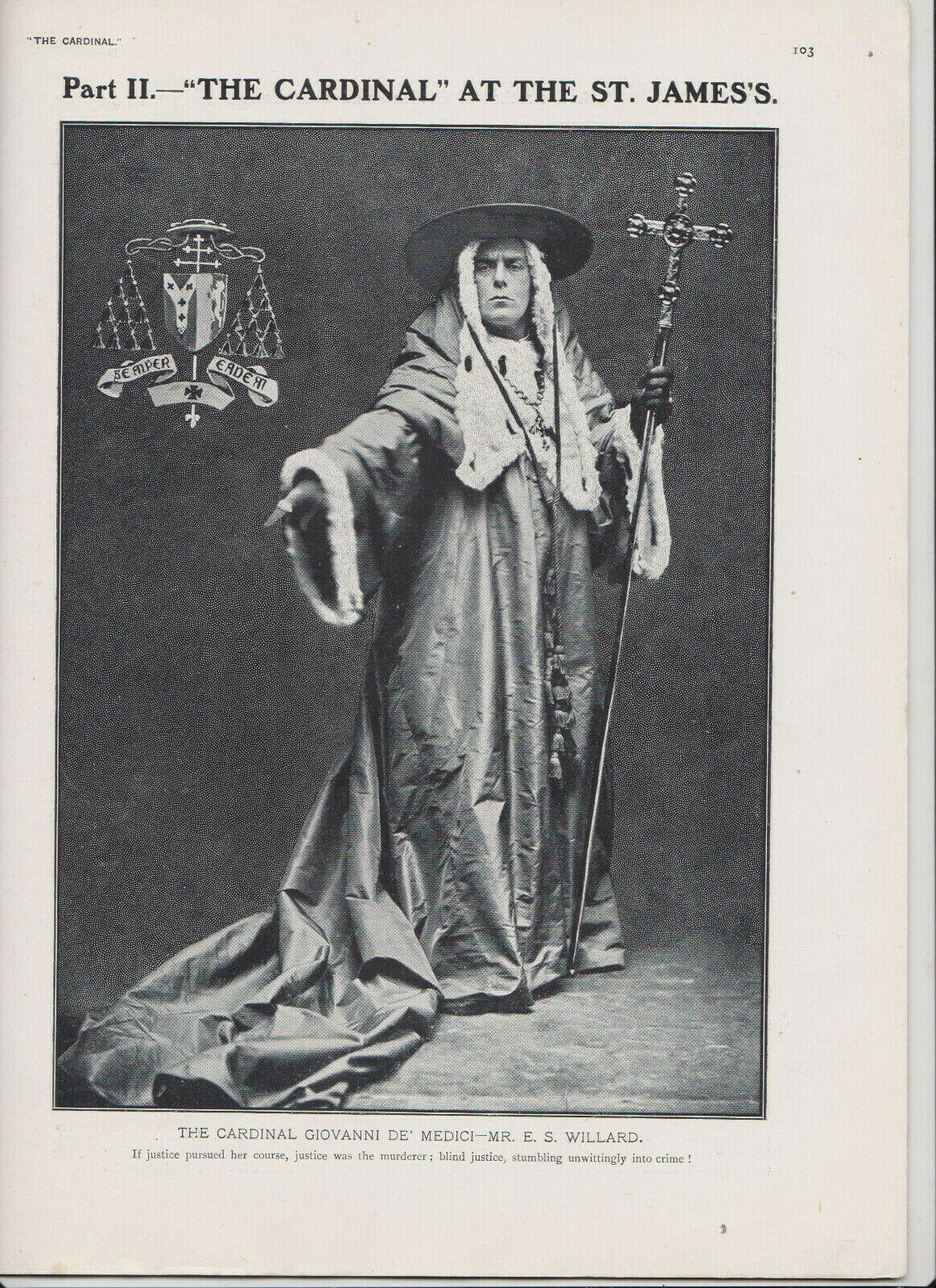
- E.S. Willard in the title role in 1903.
- Original language: English
- Written by: Louis N. Parker
- Genre: Historical drama
- Setting: Renaissance Rome and Florence

Premiere
- Date: 21 October 1901
- Place: Theatre Royal, Montreal

The Cardinal is a 1901 historical play by the British writer Louis N. Parker. It is set in Renaissance Italy at the height of the power of the Medici Dynasty.

It originally premiered at the Theatre Royal, Montreal before transferring to the Garden Theatre on Broadway. It then enjoyed a run of 106 performances at St James' Theatre in London's West End between 31 August and 5 December 1903. The original London cast included E.S. Willard, Frederick Volpe, Harry Lonsdale, Alice Lonnon, Joseph Farjeon and Helen Ferrers.

== Film adaptations ==
In 1936 the play was adapted into a film of the same title directed by Sinclair Hill and starring Matheson Lang, Eric Portman and June Duprez. It also inspired the 1945 Italian film L'abito nero da sposa directed by Luigi Zampa and starring Fosco Giachetti and Jacqueline Laurent. Furthermore it inspired the Egyptian film The Confession Chair. Youssef Wahbi, who had played the role of Cardinal Giovanni and also directed the movie and wrote its script, received a golden medal from the Vatican.

== Bibliography ==
- Curti, Roberto . Riccardo Freda: The Life and Works of a Born Filmmaker. McFarland, 2017.
- Goble, Alan. The Complete Index to Literary Sources in Film. Walter de Gruyter, 1999.
- Wearing, J.P. The London Stage 1900-1909: A Calendar of Productions, Performers, and Personnel. Scarecrow Press, 2013.
