= The Cardinal (1936 film) =

1936 British film by Sinclair Hill

- Opening titles
- Directed by: Sinclair Hill
- Written by: D. B. Wyndham-Lewis
- Based on: The Cardinal by Louis N. Parker
- Starring: Matheson Lang; Eric Portman; June Duprez
- Cinematography: Cyril Bristow
- Edited by: Max Brenner
- Music by: Leighton Lucas
- Production company: Grosvenor Films
- Distributed by: Pathé Pictures
- Release date: 26 March 1936
- Running time: 70 minutes
- Country: United Kingdom
- Language: English

The Cardinal is a 1936 British historical drama film directed by Sinclair Hill and starring Matheson Lang, Eric Portman and June Duprez. It was written by D. B. Wyndham-Lewis based on the 1901 play The Cardinal by Louis N. Parker. It was made at Welwyn Studios as an independent production and released by Associated British.

== Synopsis ==
The film depicts a power battle in sixteenth-century Rome between the leading church-statesman Giuliano de' Medici and one of his rivals. Other themes in the film are the Italian Wars against France and the construction of the new St. Peter's Basilica to a design by Michelangelo.

== Cast ==
- Matheson Lang as Cardinal de' Medici
- Eric Portman as Giuliano de' Medici
- Robert Atkins as General Belmont
- O. B. Clarence as Monterosa
- Douglas Jefferies as Baglioni
- F. B. J. Sharp as Pope Julius II
- Wilfred Fletcher as Michelangelo
- A. Bromley Davenport as Bramante
- Rayner Barton as Cardinal Orelli
- Edgar K. Bruce as Spini
- David Horne as English Abbot
- June Duprez as Francesca Monterosa
- Henrietta Watson as Donna Claricia
- Dora Barton as Duenna

== Historical accuracy ==
Questions have been raised about the historical accuracy of the film, which appears to borrow people and events from different time periods.

== Reception ==
The Monthly Film Bulletin wrote: "The historical background has been used with the main purpose of giving an air of novelty to a story in other respects quite straightforward, and the historical element as such is not large. ... The sets are simple and limited, but achieve their effect fairly well. The background of incidental detail could have been stronger and ought to have been more abundant. The dialogue ... sensibly makes no attempt at archaism, at the same time employing no discordant modern colloquialisms: in general, it is very soundly put together."

Kine Weekly wrote: "Towering above the complacency of the artificial story and its treatment is the majestic figure of Matheson Lang. He, with his fine screen presence and voice, holds the fort as only the real actor can, and it is in his magnificently dramatic performance and the colourful staging that the pisture is able to take shelter from its tiresome theatricalities."

Variety wrote: "Most noticeable defect of this filmization of an old costume drama is the lack of atmosphere of the bulk of the players and the dialog. Voices, expressions and actions hint too much of modernity ever to transport the audience to the lazy glamor of Rome in the 15th century. Matheson Lang ... gives a fine performance of simulated insanity, and is one of the few characters who seem to belong to the period."
