= NGC 1545 =

Open cluster in the constellation Perseus

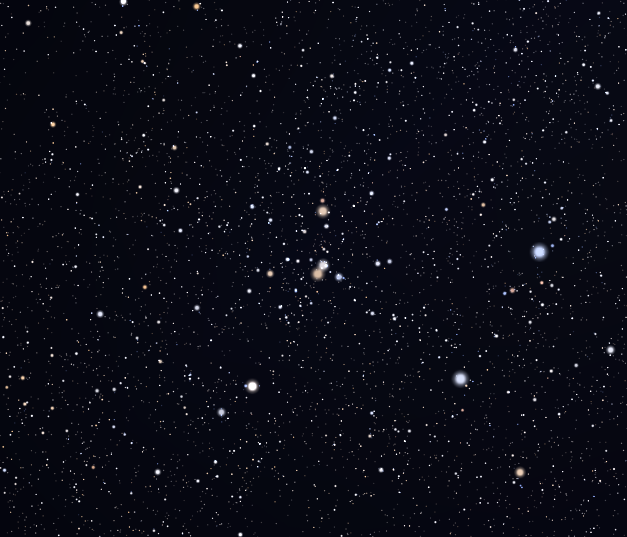
- NGC 1545

Observation data (J2000 epoch)
- Right ascension: 04^{h} 20^{m} 50^{s}
- Declination: +50° 15′ 12″
- Distance: 2,320 ly (711 pc)
- Apparent magnitude (V): 6.2
- Apparent dimensions (V): 18′

Physical characteristics
- Estimated age: 280 millions years
- Other designations: Cr 49

Associations
- Constellation: Perseus

NGC 1545, also known as the Running Man Cluster or Magic Pentagram Cluster, is an open cluster of stars in the northern constellation of Perseus. It was discovered by German-British astronomer William Herschel on December 28, 1790. This cluster is located in the north-eastern part of the constellation, a few arcminutes east of the 4.5 magnitude star b Persei, near the equally large and bright NGC 1528 (m = 6.4), which is less than 1.5° towards the northwest. However, it is less dense and rich. The brightest star of the cluster is a K5 III giant star, with 7.1 magnitude, but its membership is questionable. One more 7.9 magnitude star is visible at the north edge of the cluster.

Together with NGC 1528, it forms the M&M Double Cluster.
