= Genesis Live 1973–2007 =

Live album by Genesis

Box set by Genesis
- Released: 21 September 2009
- Recorded: 1973–2007
- Genres: Progressive rock, pop rock, soft rock
- Length: 8:10:24 (10:29:38 with "Live Over Europe")
- Labels: Virgin (UK); Atlantic/Rhino (US)
- Producers: Genesis, Nick Davis, John Burns, David Hentschel, Robert Colby

Genesis chronology
Genesis 1970–1975 (2008)	Genesis Live 1973–2007 (2009)	Genesis Movie Box 1981–2007 (2009)

Professional ratings
Review scores
Source	Rating
AllMusic	4/5 stars
Uncut	3/5 stars

Genesis Live 1973–2007 is a box set by Genesis which includes all of their live albums except Live over Europe 2007. Genesis Live and its bonus tracks, Seconds Out, and Live at the Rainbow 1973 all include bonus DVDs which feature their respective albums in 5.1 Surround Sound. Three Sides Live and The Way We Walk are included on stereo CDs only. Unlike previous Genesis box sets, this box set does not have any version which includes SACDs. Although Live Over Europe 2007 was originally slated for inclusion, producer Nick Davis persuaded the band's management to exclude the album from the box set after hearing from a number of fans that they preferred not to buy the album again so soon after its original 2007 release.

Unlike the three studio albums box sets, the remixed live albums have generally not been released as standalone CDs.

== Track listing ==
=== Genesis Live (CD/DVD) ===
Recorded 1973

1	"Watcher of the Skies"	8:34
2	"Get 'Em Out by Friday"	9:13
3	"The Return of the Giant Hogweed"	8:12
4	"The Musical Box"	10:54
5	"The Knife"	9:45
	Total	46:38

Recorded 1975

6	"Back in N.Y.C."	6:11
7	"Fly on a Windshield"	2:54
8	"Broadway Melody of 1974"	2:18
9	"Anyway"	3:33
10	"The Chamber of 32 Doors"	5:58
	Total	20:54

=== Seconds Out (2 CDs/1 DVD) ===
Recorded 1977, except where noted.

Disc 1

1	"Squonk"	6:42
2	"The Carpet Crawlers"	5:20
3	"Robbery, Assault & Battery"	6:02
4	"Afterglow"	4:25
5	"Firth of Fifth"	8:55
6	"I Know What I Like (In Your Wardrobe)"	8:44
7	"The Lamb Lies Down on Broadway"	4:59
8	"The Musical Box (Closing Section)"	3:21
	Total	48:28

Disc 2

1	"Supper's Ready"	24:41	
2	"The Cinema Show"	10:58	Recorded in 1976. Features Bill Bruford on drums rather than Chester Thompson.
3	"Dance on a Volcano"	5:09	
4	"Los Endos"	6:20	
	Total	47:08	

=== Three Sides Live (2 CDs) ===
Recorded 1981, except where noted.

Disc 1

1	"Turn It On Again"	5:16	
2	"Dodo/Lurker"	7:20	
3	"Abacab"	8:46	
4	"Behind the Lines"	5:24	
5	"Duchess"	6:43	
6	"Me and Sarah Jane"	6:08	
7	"Follow You Follow Me"	4:49	Recorded 1980
	Total	44:26	

Disc 2

1	"Misunderstanding"	4:43	
2	"In the Cage/The Cinema Show/The Colony of Slippermen"	11:51	
3	"Afterglow"	5:13	
4	"One for the Vine"	11:04	Recorded 1980
5	"The Fountain of Salmacis"	8:34	Recorded 1978
6	"it./Watcher of the Skies"	7:03	Recorded 1976. Features Bill Bruford on drums rather than Chester Thompson.
	Total	48:58	

=== The Way We Walk (2 CDs) ===
Recorded 1992, except where noted.

Disc 1

1	"Land of Confusion"	5:13
2	"No Son of Mine"	7:02
3	"Driving the Last Spike"	10:19
4	"Old Medley (Dance on a Volcano/The Lamb Lies Down on Broadway/The Musical Box (closing section)/Firth of Fifth (excerpt)/I Know What I Like)"	19:43
5	"Throwing It All Away"	6:41
6	"Fading Lights"	11:03
7	"Jesus He Knows Me"	5:32
8	"Home by the Sea/Second Home by the Sea"	12:03
	Total	1:17:36

Disc 2

1	"Hold on My Heart"	5:52	
2	"Domino"	11:25	
3	"The Drum Thing (Drum Duet)"	5:49	
4	"I Can't Dance"	7:16	
5	"Tonight, Tonight, Tonight"	3:49	
6	"Invisible Touch"	5:28	
7	"Turn It On Again"	7:11	
8	"Mama"	6:48	Recorded 1987
9	"That's All"	4:58	Recorded 1987
10	"In Too Deep"	5:36	Recorded 1986
	Total	1:04:12	

=== Live at the Rainbow (CD/DVD) ===
Recorded 1973

1	"Dancing with the Moonlit Knight"	9:05
2	"The Cinema Show"	11:05
3	"I Know What I Like (In Your Wardrobe)"	5:23
4	"Firth of Fifth"	8:33
5	"More Fool Me"	3:24
6	"The Battle of Epping Forest"	12:23
7	"Supper's Ready"	23:42
	Total	1:13:35

Download-only / DVD bonus audio tracks

1	"Watcher of the Skies"	8:01
2	"The Musical Box"	10:28
	Total	18:29

The bonus tracks were briefly available to download for Genesis-Music.com Fan Club members in WAV and MP3 and also appear, with the CD tracks, on the DVD. The DVD starts with Watcher of the Skies and The Musical Box is placed between Firth of Fifth and More Fool Me.

=== Empty Slot for Live over Europe 2007 (2 CDs/2 DVDs) ===
Recorded in 2007, Live over Europe 2007 is not included in the set but an empty slot has been provided for it to be placed in. The track listing is as follows:

Disc 1

1	"Duke's Intro (Behind the Lines/Duke's End)"	3:48
2	"Turn It On Again"	4:26
3	"No Son of Mine"	6:57
4	"Land of Confusion"	5:11
5	"In the Cage/The Cinema Show (excerpt)/Duke's Travels (excerpt)"	13:30
6	"Afterglow"	4:27
7	"Hold on My Heart"	5:58
8	"Home by the Sea/Second Home by the Sea"	11:58
9	"Follow You Follow Me"	4:19
10	"Firth of Fifth (excerpt)"	4:39
11	"I Know What I Like"	6:45
	Total	1:11:58

Disc 2

1	"Mama"	6:57
2	"Ripples..."	7:57
3	"Throwing It All Away"	6:01
4	"Domino"	11:34
5	"Conversations with 2 Stools"	6:48
6	"Los Endos"	6:24
7	"Tonight, Tonight, Tonight" (abridged)	3:49
8	"Invisible Touch"	5:35
9	"I Can't Dance"	6:11
10	"The Carpet Crawlers"	6:00
	Total	1:07:16

== Charts ==
Chart (2009)	Peak position
German Albums (Offizielle Top 100)	42
