= Genesis 1970–1975 =

Set of 5 albums by Genesis

Box set by Genesis
- Released: 10 November 2008
- Recorded: 1970–1974
- Genre: Progressive rock
- Length: Audio: 5:27:34; Video: 7:01:34
- Labels: EMI (Europe); Atlantic/Rhino (North America)
- Producers: Genesis, John Anthony, David Hitchcock, John Burns

Genesis chronology
Live over Europe 2007 (2007)	Genesis 1970–1975 (2008)	Genesis Live 1973–2007 (2009)

Professional ratings
Review scores
Source	Rating
All About Jazz	(favourable)
AllMusic	5/5 stars
Entertainment Weekly	B
The Guardian	3/5 stars
Rolling Stone	4.5/5 stars

Genesis 1970–1975 is a box set of five studio albums by Genesis featuring Peter Gabriel. It was released on 10 November 2008 in Europe by EMI and on 11 November 2008 in North America by Atlantic/Rhino. The 7-CD/6-DVD box set includes newly remixed versions of the albums Trespass, Nursery Cryme, Foxtrot, Selling England by the Pound and The Lamb Lies Down on Broadway. The band's 1969 debut album, From Genesis to Revelation, was excluded due to the rights to the album belonging to Jonathan King. The fifth pair of discs includes B-side songs, 3 rare songs from BBC Sessions in 1970 and the never-before-released Genesis Plays Jackson soundtrack. Each bonus DVD features audio versions of the albums in 5.1 surround sound, as well as videos from each album's corresponding tour, new interviews, and photo galleries. The European version includes CD/SACD Hybrids instead of standard CDs. EMI also released a limited edition six disc vinyl box set containing the original albums only on 24 November 2008.

Genesis 1970–1975 appeared at position seven in the "Top 100 Recommended CD Reviews of All Time" at All About Jazz. It has since fallen to position nine. In 2010 the box set received a Grammy Award nomination for Best Surround Sound Album.

== Audio formats ==
In the European and Japanese releases of this box set, the CDs are hybrid SACD/CDs. The SACD layer is a multichannel surround sound remix.

In the Canadian and U.S. releases of this box set, standard CDs with no SACD layer are included.

In all versions of the box set, the DVDs are DVD-Video format (not DVD-Audio), although they contain both audio and video tracks. These DVDs include three audio mixes: DTS 5.1-channel surround sound, Dolby Digital 5.1-channel surround sound, and Dolby Digital stereo. The DTS surround sound is a slightly compressed version of the surround sound on the SACDs (remark: Nick Davis talks about the DTS format and therefore means data compression/reduction, not compression of the dynamic range of the music), and the Dolby surround sound is a slightly inferior quality to the DTS.

All of the audio tracks on these CDs were remixed in stereo and surround sound by producer Nick Davis.

In addition to the 7-CD/6-DVD box set, EMI released a limited edition vinyl box set on 24 November 2008.

== Track listing ==
Trespass & tracks 2–10 of Extra Tracks 1970–1975 written by: Phillips/Rutherford/Gabriel/Banks

All other tracks written by: Banks/Rutherford/Gabriel/Collins/Hackett

=== Trespass ===
CD

1	"Looking for Someone"	7:02
2	"White Mountain"	6:44
3	"Visions of Angels"	6:51
4	"Stagnation"	8:46
5	"Dusk"	4:11
6	"The Knife"	8:53
	Total	42:27

DVD

1	Reissues Interview	2007	42:32

=== Nursery Cryme ===
CD

1	"The Musical Box"	10:31
2	"For Absent Friends"	1:48
3	"The Return of the Giant Hogweed"	8:09
4	"Seven Stones"	5:09
5	"Harold the Barrel"	3:00
6	"Harlequin"	2:56
7	"The Fountain of Salmacis"	8:00
	Total	39:33

DVD

1	Reissues Interview	2007	36:18

=== Foxtrot ===
CD

1	"Watcher of the Skies"	7:22
2	"Time Table"	4:46
3	"Get 'Em Out by Friday"	8:36
4	"Can-Utility and the Coastliners"	5:45
5	"Horizons"	1:41
6	"Supper's Ready"	23:04
	Total	51:14

DVD

1	Reissues Interview	2007	34:16
2	Brussels, Belgium: Rock of the '70s	1972	29:20
	"The Fountain of Salmacis"		
	"Twilight Alehouse"		
	"The Musical Box"		
	"The Return of the Giant Hogweed"		
3	Rome, Italy: Piper Club	1972	4:07
	Interview		
	"Stagnation (Incomplete)"		
	Total		1:07:43

=== Selling England by the Pound ===
CD

1	"Dancing with the Moonlit Knight"	8:02
2	"I Know What I Like (In Your Wardrobe)"	4:10
3	"Firth of Fifth"	9:35
4	"More Fool Me"	3:10
5	"The Battle of Epping Forest"	11:44
6	"After the Ordeal"	4:15
7	"The Cinema Show"	10:41
8	"Aisle of Plenty"	1:56
	Total	53:33

DVD

1	Reissues Interview	2007	32:36
2	Shepperton Studios, Italian TV	1973	1:00:47
	"Watcher of the Skies"		
	"Dancing with the Moonlit Knight"		
	"I Know What I Like (In Your Wardrobe)"		
	"The Musical Box"		
	"Supper's Ready"		
3	Bataclan, France	1973	33:50
	"The Musical Box"		
	"Supper's Ready"		
	"The Return of the Giant Hogweed"		
	"The Knife"		
	Interview in French		
	Total		2:06:56

=== The Lamb Lies Down on Broadway ===
CD

Disc 1

1	"The Lamb Lies Down on Broadway"	4:51
2	"Fly on a Windshield"	2:44
3	"Broadway Melody of 1974"	2:11
4	"Cuckoo Cocoon"	2:13
5	"In the Cage"	8:09
6	"The Grand Parade of Lifeless Packaging"	2:44
7	"Back in N.Y.C."	5:36
8	"Hairless Heart"	2:06
9	"Counting Out Time"	4:12
10	"The Carpet Crawlers"	5:11
11	"The Chamber of 32 Doors"	5:40
	Total	45:37

DVD

1	Reissues Interview	2007	51:20
2	Melody: French TV	1974	30:23
	"I Know What I Like (In Your Wardrobe)"		
	"Supper's Ready"		
	Total		1:21:43

Disc 2

1	"Lilywhite Lilith"	2:48
2	"The Waiting Room"	5:15
3	"Anyway"	3:08
4	"Here Comes the Supernatural Anaesthetist"	2:56
5	"The Lamia"	6:56
6	"Silent Sorrow in Empty Boats"	2:58
7	"The Colony of Slippermen (I. Arrival/II. A Visit to the Doktor/III. Raven)"	8:11
8	"Ravine"	2:06
9	"The Light Dies Down on Broadway"	3:32
10	"Riding the Scree"	4:06
11	"In the Rapids"	2:18
12	"it."	4:17
	Total	48:31

=== Extra Tracks 1970 to 1975 ===
CD

1	"Happy the Man"	1972	3:10	Released as a non-album single
2	"Twilight Alehouse"	1973	7:48	B-side of the "I Know What I Like (In Your Wardrobe)" single
3	"Going Out To Get You"	1969	4:55	Demo
4	"Shepherd"	1970	4:04	Recorded for the "BBC Night Ride" programme, 22 February 1970.
5	"Pacidy"	1970	5:44	Recorded for the "BBC Night Ride" programme, 22 February 1970.
6	"Let Us Now Make Love"	1970	6:16	Recorded for the "BBC Night Ride" programme, 22 February 1970.
7	"Provocation"	1969	4:10	Genesis Plays Jackson: Recorded for a BBC documentary about painter Michael Jackson which never aired.
8	"Frustration"	1969	3:42	Genesis Plays Jackson: Recorded for a BBC documentary about painter Michael Jackson which never aired.
9	"Manipulation"	1969	3:49	Genesis Plays Jackson: Recorded for a BBC documentary about painter Michael Jackson which never aired.
10	"Resignation"	1969	3:01	Genesis Plays Jackson: Recorded for a BBC documentary about painter Michael Jackson which never aired.
	Total		46:39	

- The booklet lists "Going Out To Get You" as track 6. It is actually track 3. This page lists the tracks in the correct order.
- The first half of "Provocation" would be used two years later as the fanfare/verse of "The Fountain of Salmacis", while its second half was soon appropriated for the instrumental breakdown of Trespass' "Looking for Someone".
- "Frustration" is largely based around a Tony Banks piano theme that would only reappear four years down the road as "Anyway" on The Lamb Lies Down on Broadway, though it also incorporates a fragment of the unreleased early song "Hair on the Arms and Legs," otherwise only available as a demo on the Genesis Archive 1967–75 boxed set.
- "Manipulation" is primarily composed of several instrumental fragments that would later be assembled into "The Musical Box" for Nursery Cryme.
- "Resignation" is the only track that lacks an obvious connection to any later Genesis song, though its chord changes are at times reminiscent of the already-released "In Hiding" (from From Genesis to Revelation), the instrumental section of "Stagnation" (from Trespass), and "The Musical Box."

DVD

1	Reissues Interview	2007	6:43
2	VH1 Special: Archive 1	1998	44:08
3	Midnight Special	1973	15:31
	"Watcher of the Skies"		
	"The Musical Box"		
	Total		1:06:22

== Personnel ==
On all tracks:

- Tony Banks – keyboards, guitar, background vocals, second lead vocal on "Shepherd"
- Mike Rutherford – guitars, bass, bass pedals, cello, background vocals
- Peter Gabriel – lead vocals, flute, bass drum, oboe, tambourine

On Trespass, and tracks 3–10 of Extra Tracks:

- Anthony Phillips – guitar, backing vocals, second lead vocal on "Let Us Now Make Love"
- John Mayhew – drums, percussion, backing vocals

On Nursery Cryme, Foxtrot, Selling England by the Pound, The Lamb Lies Down on Broadway, and tracks 1–2 of Extra Tracks:

- Steve Hackett – guitars
- Phil Collins – drums, percussion, backing vocals, lead vocals on "For Absent Friends" and "More Fool Me," second lead vocal on "Harlequin" and "The Colony of Slippermen"

== Charts ==
Chart (2008)	Peak position
Dutch Albums (Album Top 100)	65
German Albums (Offizielle Top 100)	22
Italian Albums (FIMI)	96

== Formats ==
UK/EU Version: CD/SACD hybrid + DVD (PAL)
US/Canadian Version: CD + DVD (NTSC)
Japanese Version: CD/SACD hybrid + DVD (NTSC)
