= Supper's Ready =

1972 song by Genesis

- A 1977 French promo LP featuring an excerpt of "Supper's Ready" from the live album Seconds Out

Song by Genesis

from the album Foxtrot
- Released: 15 September 1972
- Recorded: August–September 1972
- Studio: Island, London
- Genre: Progressive rock
- Length: 22:54
- Label: Charisma
- Songwriters: Tony Banks; Phil Collins; Peter Gabriel; Steve Hackett; Mike Rutherford
- Producer: Dave Hitchcock

Official audio
- "Supper's Ready" on YouTube

"Supper's Ready" is a song by English progressive rock band Genesis, recorded for their 1972 studio album Foxtrot. At nearly 23 minutes in length, it is the band's longest recorded song. (Note: Genesis keyboardist Tony Banks has claimed that "The Movement", a Genesis song that was never recorded, at times ran approximately 30 minutes long.) Frontman Peter Gabriel wrote the lyrics, which mainly describe a personal journey of scenes from the Book of Revelation and good versus evil, with several real life experiences providing further inspiration.

The song took form in the summer of 1972, when Genesis dedicated time to write new songs after touring Nursery Cryme. After the opening acoustic sections were arranged, it was considered a companion piece to "The Musical Box" until Gabriel pitched the tune "Willow Farm", which took the song into a different direction. Genesis extended the piece further, culminating in the final two sections, "Apocalypse in 9/8" and "As Sure as Eggs is Eggs (Aching Men's Feet)", which the band felt was some of their strongest recorded material.

A common misconception is that the track occupies an entire side of Foxtrot. In fact, "Horizons", a short guitar piece by Steve Hackett, opens the side, but "Supper's Ready" does occupy an entire side of the live album Seconds Out.

"Supper's Ready" became a centrepiece of Genesis live shows from 1972 to 1974, and a showcase for Gabriel's on-stage storytelling and costumes, acting out the various sections. Following Gabriel's departure from the band, Genesis performed the song live in 1976, 1977, and 1982, with Phil Collins on lead vocals.

== Structure and programme notes ==
"Willow Farm"

Single by Genesis

from the album Foxtrot
- A-side: "Watcher of the Skies"
- Released: 6 October 1972
- Recorded: August 1972
- Genre: Progressive rock
- Length: 4:31; 2:57 (single edit)
- Label: Charisma
- Songwriters: Tony Banks; Phil Collins; Peter Gabriel; Steve Hackett; Mike Rutherford
- Producer: Dave Hitchcock

Genesis singles chronology
"Happy the Man" / "Seven Stones" (1972)	"Watcher of the Skies" / "Willow Farm" (1972)	"I Know What I Like (In Your Wardrobe)" / "Twilight Alehouse" (1974)

Gabriel wrote additional explanations for each of the song's sections in a programme sold to concertgoers in 1972 and 1973.

Part	Title	Duration	Notes
i.	"Lover's Leap"	0:00–3:47	In which two lovers are lost in each other's eyes, and found again transformed in the bodies of another male and female.
ii.	"The Guaranteed Eternal Sanctuary Man"	3:48–5:43	The lovers come across a town dominated by two characters; one a benevolent farmer and the other the head of a highly disciplined scientific religion. The latter likes to be known as "The Guaranteed Eternal Sanctuary Man" and claims to contain a secret new ingredient capable of fighting fire. This is a falsehood, an untruth, a whopper and a taradiddle, or to put it in clearer terms: a lie.
iii.	"Ikhnaton and Its-a-Con and Their Band of Merry Men"	5:44–9:42	Who the lovers see clad in greys and purples, awaiting to be summoned out of the ground. At the G.E.S.M's command they put forth from the bowels of the earth, to attack all those without an up-to-date "Eternal Life Licence", which were obtainable at the head office of the G.E.S.M.'s religion.
iv.	"How Dare I Be So Beautiful?"	9:43–11:04	In which our intrepid heroes investigate the aftermath of the battle and discover a solitary figure, obsessed by his own image. They witness an unusual transmutation, and are pulled into their own reflections in the water.
v.	"Willow Farm"	11:05–14:15	Climbing out of the pool, they are once again in a different existence. They're right in the middle of a myriad of bright colours, filled with all manner of objects, plants, animals and humans. Life flows freely and everything is mindlessly busy. At random, a whistle blows and every single thing is instantly changed into another.
vi.	"Apocalypse in 9/8 (Co-starring the Delicious Talents of Gabble Ratchet)"	14:16–20:50	At one whistle the lovers become seeds in the soil, where they recognise other seeds to be people from the world in which they had originated. While they wait for Spring, they are returned to their old world to see Apocalypse of St John in full progress. The seven trumpeteers cause a sensation, the fox keeps throwing sixes, and Pythagoras (a Greek extra) is deliriously happy as he manages to put exactly the right amount of milk and honey on his corn flakes.
vii.	"As Sure as Eggs is Eggs (Aching Men's Feet)"	20:51–22:54	Above all else an egg is an egg. "And did those feet...", making ends meet. Jerusalem = place of peace.

== Writing ==
In the summer of 1972, the Genesis line-up of Peter Gabriel, Tony Banks, Mike Rutherford, Phil Collins, and Steve Hackett began to write new material for their fourth studio album, Foxtrot. They retreated to a rehearsal space beneath the Una Billings School of Dance in Shepherds Bush, London, where the bulk of the song's instrumentation was worked out. During rehearsals the group decided to write a track that took up one side of a record. Gabriel noted the group had gained confidence in their songwriting and had a strong enough following to attempt a longform piece.

Early on the band considered "Supper's Ready" to be a follow-up piece to "Stagnation" from Trespass (1970) and "The Musical Box" on Nursery Cryme, as those songs developed in the same way. To avoid repetition, the group incorporated a tune that Gabriel had written on the piano called "Willow Farm", which took the song into a different direction as it contained what Banks described as an "ugly, descending-chords sequence" and jarring sound. The track concludes with "Apocalypse in 9/8" and "As Sure as Eggs Is Eggs", the former being a building instrumental in a 9/8 time signature written by Banks, Rutherford, and Collins, with Hackett later layering a guitar riff. Banks plays a keyboard solo throughout which he wanted to be purely instrumental, but Gabriel started singing on it which Banks disagreed with until he realised how strong it sounded upon playback. Producer Dave Hitchcock said the moment Gabriel comes in with "666 is no longer alone" was "so powerful" and "spine tingling."

The lyrics originated from two incidents; one involved Gabriel, his first wife Jill, and producer John Anthony at Jill's parents' flat in London. According to Gabriel, during a late-night conversation, Jill began speaking with a completely different voice. Gabriel held up a makeshift cross out of a candlestick and another household item, and Jill reacted violently. She was eventually calmed down and taken to bed, but neither Gabriel nor Anthony slept that night. The second incident also happened late at night, whereby Gabriel looked out of the window of Jill's parents' house to see what he perceived to be an entirely different lawn, across which seven shrouded men were walking. Hackett gave further details, claiming there had been "some drug taking" and that Jill experienced a bad trip, to which Gabriel managed "to talk her around and get her out of the horrors" ... "So that's a part of what the song was about, but in a way there's a kind of redemption implication that goes with that."

These experiences led Gabriel to contemplate notions of good against evil and the supernatural, and eventually inspired the lyrics to not only "Lover's Leap", the opening section, but the entire song. Later he summaried that "Supper's Ready" describes a personal journey through various scenes from the Book of Revelation. He gave a more detailed summary in Tony Palmer's book All You Need Is Love–"The ultimate cosmic battle for Armageddon between good and evil in which man is destroyed, but the deaths of countless thousands atone for mankind, reborn no longer as Homo sapiens". Gabriel also cited the Christian allegory The Pilgrim's Progress as a source of inspiration, as with the story to The Lamb Lies Down on Broadway (1974), his final album with the group.

== Recording ==
The band kicked off recording with producer Bob Potter and engineer Tony Platt. However, halfway through recording "Supper's Ready", the group felt they were not working well with Potter and promoted Platt to the producer role. This collaboration also failed to work out, so Charisma Records owner Tony Stratton Smith brought in Dave Hitchcock as producer, in part because Hitchcock had experience with recording epic suites like "Supper's Ready" (specifically, the track "Nine Feet Underground" from In the Land of Grey and Pink by Caravan), and Hitchcock in turn brought in engineer John Burns. All told, three outside producers and two engineers worked on the song. Hackett recalled Burns taking a liking to the 12-string guitar parts for the track, and encouraged the band to continue with it. After an Italian tour in August 1972, Hackett flew back to England several days before the rest of the band to record his guitar parts to the end of "Supper's Ready". Banks and Rutherford had to resort to splicing the final two sections together in a different London studio, as their allotted time at Island had come to an end. The pair found the two parts were recorded and mixed in slightly different tuning, which was rectified by slowing down a track. This anomaly was fully corrected on the 2008 remix. When "Supper's Ready" was finished, Hackett initially felt that fans or management at Charisma Records would not understand it. "I thought maybe they're gonna say, 'You've gone too far this time, guys. It's all over.'" Genesis associate and road manager Richard Macphail recalled when he first heard the song: "No matter what we were doing, we'd have to listen to 'Supper's Ready' all the way through; it became a daily ritual."

== Sections ==
"Lover's Leap" and "As Sure as Eggs Is Eggs" were based on an acoustic guitar piece that Banks had written while he was at university. Hackett, Rutherford, and Banks each play a 12-string guitar fed through two Leslie speakers on "Lover's Leap"; Hackett noted its chord sequence is the same as one used on A Salty Dog (1969) by Procol Harum. Gabriel originally sang the piece an octave higher which strained his voice, to which Hackett suggested he sing one lower, and they used both vocals in the mix. During the instrumental section Gabriel and Collins sing vocal harmonies, and Hackett and Rutherford play 12-string guitars in harmony. "The Guaranteed Eternal Sanctuary Man" was also a piece from Banks, which Hackett described as "deliberately naïve" and features him playing "economical" guitar parts. The section ends with a group of children singing, who were brought in from the street outside the studio. Hackett said it was a parody of an English carol, "The Rocking Carol". "Ikhnaton and Itsacon and Their Band of Merry Men" is a more dynamic and lively piece, the title of which references the Egyptian pharaoh Akhenaten. It features Rutherford strumming a 12-string and Hackett on electric and employing guitar tapping, a technique where the guitar fretboard is played like a keyboard.

The title of "How Dare I Be So Beautiful?" refers to a catchphrase used by the band's early music business contact, Jonathan King. The instrumentation for this section is a series of acoustic piano chords which are faded in by the mixing board after each chord is struck, such that the listener can only hear the sustain and not the initial notes. The lyrics mention the Greek myth of Narcissus who is turned into a flower.

"Willow Farm" contains vaudeville-style passages and features noises of trains and explosions. The section was written entirely by Gabriel, and ends with an instrumental section inspired by "Dance of the Sugar Plum Fairy". Collins and Rutherford compared the humorous nature of "Willow Farm" to "Harold the Barrel" from Nursery Cryme.

"Apocalypse in 9/8" originated from Banks and Rutherford; the former had devised a keyboard solo without knowing its time signature, to which a rhythm was worked out to suit. Collins, having been absent from the studio for part of the day, returned and played along to the passage, "still not really knowing what it was." Gabble Ratchet is a reference to wild geese, which a legend says are the souls of unbaptized children wandering the air until the Day of Judgment. The tour programme refers to this section as "Co-starring the Delicious Talents of Wild Geese". Gabriel said the lyrics are in part about being between two extremes: "There's always a left and right, an up and down, a good and bad and if everyone's good there must automatically be some bad."

"As Sure as Eggs is Eggs" is a folklore variation of the logical tautology that "x=x". The lyrics refer to a New Jerusalem, a city of God established after the death of the anti-Christ, and the Second Coming. The track "Los Endos" on A Trick of the Tail has Collins singing "There's an angel standing in the sun" twice in succession, followed by "Free to get back home" as the track fades out. Hackett said the lyric is a reference to The Angel Standing in the Sun, a painting by J. M. W. Turner.

== Reception ==
The song became a strong favourite with Genesis fans. Banks said the latter parts are "probably our peak". In Dailyvault's ranking of Gabriel-era Genesis songs, "Supper Ready" was ranked 3rd. Gabriel said the band were invited by a man who was formerly Edith Piaf's promoter to perform the song at his church in Normandy.

== Live performance ==
"Supper's Ready" was performed live in its entirety for the first time at Brunel University in Uxbridge, on 10 November 1972, several months into the Foxtrot Tour. The tour lasted until mid-1973, by which time it became a centrepiece of the live show and a showcase for Gabriel's on-stage storytelling and costumes to act out the various parts. Genesis performed the song during their subsequent tour promoting the next album, Selling England by the Pound (1973), until April 1974. Following Gabriel's departure in the following year, Genesis performed "Supper's Ready" live in 1976, 1977, and in 1982. The final two sections were performed twice in 1978 and in 1986 as part of a medley of the group's old material. A shortened version of the song was rehearsed for The Last Domino? Tour, but ultimately not performed.

Gabriel's costumes debuted at the band's headlining concert at London's Rainbow Theatre in February 1973. For "The Guaranteed Eternal Sanctuary Man", Gabriel would don a crown of thorns headpiece. For "Willow Farm", he wore a flower mask designed by Guy Chapman, inspired by the character Little Weed from the children's television programme Flower Pot Men. Banks said Gabriel would adopt his "music hall persona" for this section, "and he became even more the centre of attention." For "Apocalypse in 9/8", Gabriel wore a Magog outfit consisting of a black cloak with a triangular box headgear with lights for a pair of eyes. An image of Gabriel in this costume was printed on the front cover of the live album, Genesis Live (1973). His performance would climax for "As Sure as Eggs is Eggs" with the firing of a flash charge of magnesium powder and Gabriel would discard his Magog costume to reveal himself in shining white apparel and luminous makeup, holding a fluorescent light tube as the rest of the stage was in darkness. On some shows during the Selling England tour, Gabriel was lifted above the stage on a wire during this section. During one of these shows, the wires started twisting and he was nearly strangled.

Gabriel would introduce the song with a story. A recording from October 1973 with his story was released on the 1998 box set Genesis Archive 1967–75. He said: "Old Michael went past the pet shop, which was never open, into the park, which was never closed. And the park was full of a very smooth, clean, green grass. So he took off all his clothes and began rubbing his flesh into the wet, clean, green grass. He accompanied himself with a little tune – it went like this." Gabriel would briefly perform scat singing to Collins's drum accompaniment. Gabriel continues: "Beneath the ground, the dirty brown writhing things called 'worms' interpreted the pitter-patter from above as rainfall. Rainfall in worm world means two things: mating and bath time. Both of these experiences were thoroughly enjoyable to the worm colony. Within seconds, the entire surface of the park was a mass of dirty, brown, soggy, writhing forms. He was still pleased, Old Michael, and he began whistling a tune this time to accompany himself." Gabriel then briefly whistles the beginning of the hymn Jerusalem. He concludes: "Jerusalem Boogie to us, perhaps. But to the birds it meant that supper was ready."

== Analysis ==
In a musicological analysis by Nors Josephson, the structure of "Supper's Ready" is comparable to a variation of sonata form and described "As Sure as Eggs is Eggs" as a "Lisztian, symphonic apotheosis" of the "cyclical fanfares that originated in "The Guaranteed Eternal Sanctuary Man". The song undergoes multiple changes in time signature, key signature, Leitmotif, instrumentation, and mood. It has been described as a song cycle.

== Personnel ==
Credits are adapted from the album's 1972 liner notes.

Genesis

- Peter Gabriel – lead vocals, flute, bass drum, tambourine, oboe
- Phil Collins – drums, backing vocals, triangle, tubular bells, percussion, whistles
- Tony Banks – Hammond organ, Mellotron, Hohner Pianet, piano, treated piano, 12-string acoustic guitar
- Steve Hackett – electric guitar, 12-string acoustic guitar, classical guitar, guitar effects
- Mike Rutherford – bass, 12-string acoustic guitar, cello, backing vocals, Dewtron "Mister Bassman" bass pedals

Production

- David Hitchcock – production
- John Burns – engineer
- Richard Macphail – technician, stage sound (sound friend)
