= Genesis Live =

1973 album

Live album by Genesis
- Released: 20 July 1973
- Recorded: 24 February 1973 at Free Trade Hall, Manchester ("The Return of the Giant Hogweed") and 25 February 1973 at De Montfort Hall, Leicester (rest of album)
- Genre: Progressive rock
- Length: 46:45
- Labels: Charisma; Atlantic
- Producers: John Burns; Genesis

Genesis chronology
Foxtrot (1972)	Genesis Live (1973)	Selling England by the Pound (1973)

Genesis Live is the first live album by the English progressive rock band Genesis, released on 20 July 1973 by Charisma Records. Conceived by label owner Tony Stratton-Smith, the album was intended to bridge a scheduling gap and maintain public interest while the group experienced prolonged writing sessions for their fifth studio album, Selling England by the Pound (1973). The band initially resisted the release, but acquiesced on the condition that the record be sold at a budget price. The final track listing was compiled from two unbroadcast February 1973 performances during the Foxtrot tour, captured for the King Biscuit Flower Hour radio programme and later mixed at Island Studios with engineer John Burns.

Upon release, Genesis Live became the band's highest-charting album in the UK to date and their first to enter the UK top ten, peaking at No. 9 and temporarily outselling Foxtrot. Following its delayed 1974 release in the US, it also became the group's first album to enter the charts, peaking at No. 105 on the Billboard 200. Dissatisfied with the release, the band temporarily deleted it from their catalogue in 1977 following the launch of their second live album, Seconds Out. The album was later remastered for the 2009 box set Genesis Live 1973–2007, with a simultaneous individual CD reissue expanding the track listing to include live recordings from 1975.

== Background and recording ==
Following the promotional tour for Foxtrot (1972) in May 1973, Genesis began writing and rehearsing material for their follow-up studio album, Selling England by the Pound (1973). Progress stalled early in the sessions, however, as the band spent considerable time rewriting and rearranging songs. Recognising that the group would miss their three-month delivery deadline, Charisma Records owner Tony Stratton-Smith proposed releasing a live album to bridge the scheduling gap rather than rushing the studio sessions. The band initially resisted the idea. Frontman Peter Gabriel objected that the heavy visual emphasis of their theatrical stage show would be entirely lost on audio, while drummer Phil Collins questioned whether their live performances matched the technical quality of their studio recordings. Despite these reservations, Stratton-Smith persisted. The band ultimately relented on the condition that the album be sold at a budget price, ensuring distribution through major high street retail chains like Woolworths and WHSmith and maximising commercial exposure.

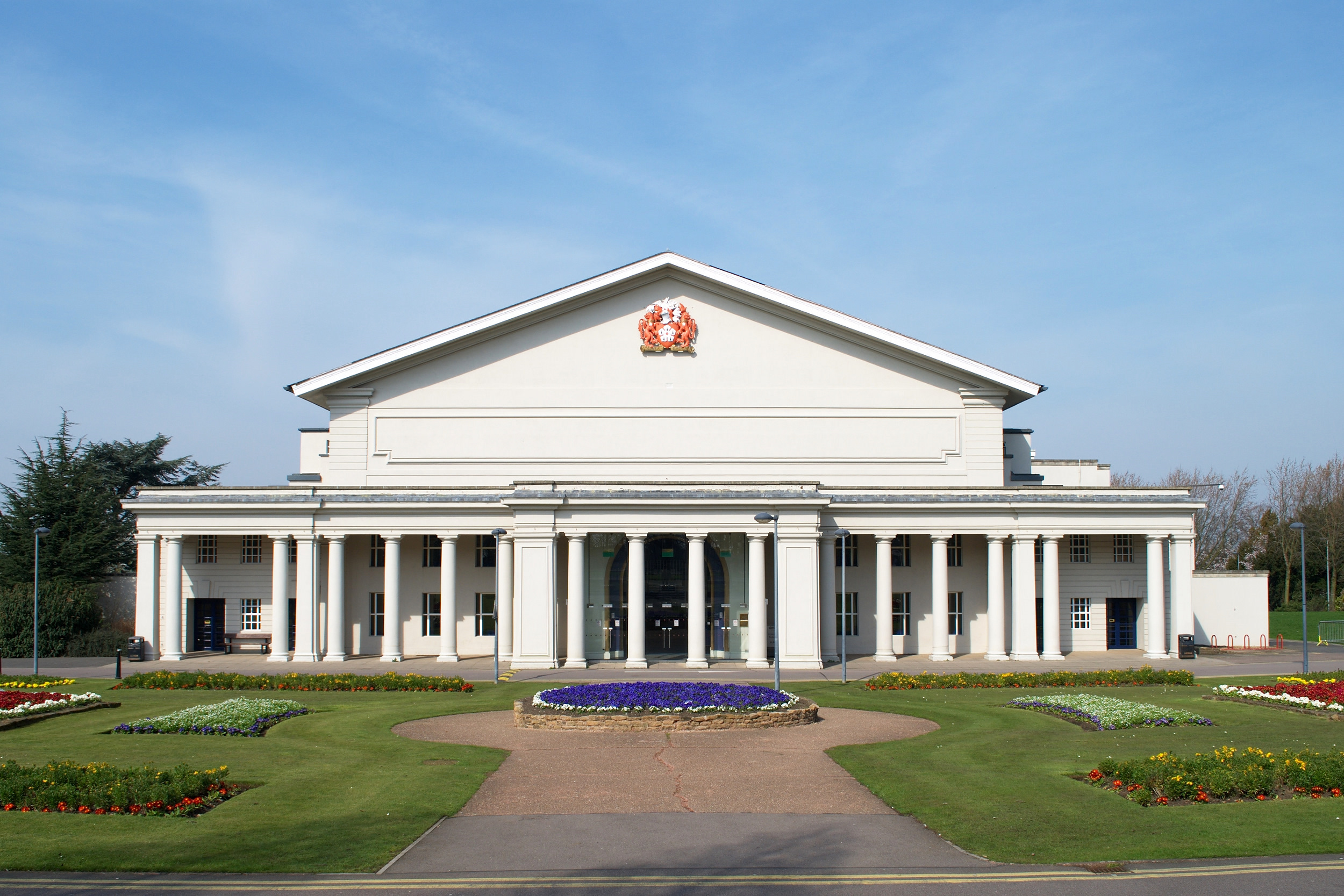
Leicester's De Montfort Hall

The available audio source material was restricted to two performances from February 1973 during the second British leg of the Foxtrot tour. Recorded by engineer Alan Perkins with the Pye Records mobile studio unit, these shows were originally produced for the American syndicated radio programme the King Biscuit Flower Hour but were never broadcast. To prepare the material for commercial release, Stratton-Smith acquired the unedited multitrack tapes; the band then mixed and edited the tracks at Island Studios alongside engineer John Burns. The majority of the final album comprises the 25 February performance at Leicester's De Montfort Hall, though "The Return of the Giant Hogweed" was sourced from the previous evening's concert at the Free Trade Hall in Manchester. A limited number of promotional double-LP test pressings distributed to radio stations additionally featured Gabriel's spoken track introductions and "Supper's Ready" from the Leicester gig.

The album's front cover features a photograph by Bob Gruen taken during a March 1973 concert at Princeton University in New Jersey, capturing Gabriel performing "Supper's Ready" in his Magog costume. On the reverse sleeve, Gabriel authored an untitled, surreal short story derived from one of his standard between-song stage monologues. The narrative details a woman who undresses inside a crowded, stranded London Underground train; upon stripping naked, she unzips her body to reveal a golden rod. This text attracted the attention of American filmmaker William Friedkin, who approached Gabriel during the writing sessions for The Lamb Lies Down on Broadway (1974) to propose a cinematic collaboration. Although Gabriel temporarily left Genesis for several weeks to pursue the opportunity, he soon returned to complete the album and its accompanying tour. Additionally, the sleeve notes contain a tribute to the band's longtime friend and sound engineer, Richard Macphail, who departed the organisation in April 1973 for other ventures. Due to its ambiguous wording, the dedication led to persistent but erroneous public speculation that Macphail had died.

== Release and reception ==
Professional ratings
Review scores
Source	Rating
AllMusic	3.5/5 stars
Rolling Stone	(favourable)
The Rolling Stone Album Guide	3/5 stars

Genesis Live was released on 20 July 1973 as part of Charisma's new CLASS budget imprint series. It became the band's highest-charting album to date and their first to enter the UK top ten, peaking at No. 9. Stratton-Smith noted that the live record temporarily outsold Foxtrot. Its US release followed in 1974, several months after Selling England by the Pound, and marked the final Charisma album distributed in North America by Buddah Records before the label transferred its distribution rights to Atlantic Records. The American release frustrated Gabriel, who believed it breached an agreement with Charisma that restricted the record's distribution to the UK. Gabriel also felt the release was produced with insufficient quality control and was counterproductive, as it featured an outdated live set. The band remained dissatisfied with the album and it was temporarily deleted from their catalogue in 1977 following the release of their second live double-LP, Seconds Out (1977).

A remastered version was released on CD in 1994 by Virgin in Europe and Atlantic in the US and Canada. A remixed version was included in 2009's Genesis Live 1973–2007 set, also released by Virgin in Europe and Atlantic in the U.S. and Canada.

Rolling Stone gave the album a brief but positive review, commenting that "this album goes a long way toward capturing the gripping power and mysticism that has many fans acclaiming Genesis as 'the greatest live band ever'". A retrospective review by AllMusic was also resoundingly positive. They remarked "it's doubtful that anyone ever got a richer sound out of a Mellotron on-stage than Tony Banks does on this album, and Steve Hackett, Mike Rutherford, and Phil Collins' playing is all quite amazing as a whole unit, holding together some very complex music in a live setting". They judged all the recordings to be far superior to their studio originals.

== Track listing ==
All songs by Tony Banks, Phil Collins, Peter Gabriel, Steve Hackett and Mike Rutherford, except "The Knife", by Banks, Gabriel, Anthony Phillips and Rutherford.

Side one
No.	Title	Length
1.	"Watcher of the Skies"	8:34
2.	"Get 'Em Out by Friday"	9:14
3.	"The Return of the Giant Hogweed"	8:14
Total length:		26:02

Side two
No.	Title	Length
1.	"The Musical Box"	10:56
2.	"The Knife"	9:47
Total length:		20:43

=== 2009 re-issue ===
No.	Title	Length
1.	"Watcher of the Skies"	8:39
2.	"Get 'Em Out by Friday"	9:08
3.	"The Return of the Giant Hogweed"	8:32
4.	"The Musical Box"	10:34
5.	"The Knife"	9:48
Total length:		46:41

Additional live tracks from 1975
No.	Title	Length
1.	"Back in N.Y.C."	6:09
2.	"Fly on a Windshield"	2:54
3.	"Broadway Melody of 1974"	2:18
4.	"Anyway"	3:33
5.	"The Chamber of 32 Doors"	5:58
Total length:		20:52

== Personnel ==
Genesis

- Peter Gabriel – lead vocals, flute, tambourine, bass drum
- Tony Banks – Hammond organ, Mellotron, Hohner Pianet, 12-string guitar, backing vocals
- Steve Hackett – lead guitar
- Mike Rutherford – bass guitar, Dewtron "Mister Bassman" bass pedal synthesizer, 12-string guitar, backing vocals
- Phil Collins – drums, percussion, backing vocals

Production

- Genesis – production, mixing
- John Burns – production, mixing
- Bob Gruen – front photograph

== Release history ==
All releases of Genesis Live on Charisma Records in the U.S. were distributed by Buddah Records.

=== US LP releases ===
- Charisma CAS-1666 (1973): first issue with large Mad Hatter label.
- Charisma CAS-1666 (1973): second issue with pink scroll label.
- Charisma CAS-1666 (1974): third issue with small Mad Hatter label.
- Atlantic 81855-1 (1982): Reissue.

=== US CD releases ===
- Atlantic 81855-2 (1988): First U.S. CD release.
- Atlantic 82676-2 (1994): Definitive Edition Remaster.

== Charts ==
Chart (1973)	Peak position
UK Albums (Official Charts)	9
US Billboard 200	105
