= Foxtrot (album) =

Studio album by Genesis
- Released: 15 September 1972
- Recorded: August 1972
- Studios: Island, London
- Genre: Progressive rock
- Length: 51:13
- Label: Charisma
- Producers: Dave Hitchcock; Genesis

Genesis chronology
Nursery Cryme (1971)	Foxtrot (1972)	Genesis Live (1973)

Singles from Foxtrot
- 1. "Watcher of the Skies" Released: February 1973

Foxtrot is the fourth studio album by the English progressive rock band Genesis, released on 15 September 1972 by Charisma Records. It features their longest recorded song, the 23-minute track "Supper's Ready".

The album was recorded during the tour in support of their previous album, Nursery Cryme (1971), which saw them gain popularity, including a well-received slot at the Great Western Festival, Lincolnshire, in May 1972. The album was written over the summer of 1972 and combined songs that had already been performed live with new material worked out in jam sessions. Recording began in August with Bob Potter as producer, but sessions were prone to tension and disagreements. After a short Italian tour, sessions resumed with Dave Hitchcock as producer. The cover was the final one designed by Paul Whitehead, featuring a fox wearing a red dress. Frontman, Peter Gabriel, wore the dress and a fox's head on stage during the following tour, which gathered press attention and raised the group's profile.

Foxtrot was the first Genesis album to chart in the UK, reaching No. 12, and received largely positive reviews. It reached No. 15 in Italy, where the band had been popular for some time. The album has continued to attract critical praise and was reissued with a new stereo and 5.1 surround sound mix as part of their 2008 Genesis 1970–1975 box set.

== Background ==
By the end of January 1971, Genesis consisted of frontman and singer Peter Gabriel, keyboardist Tony Banks, bassist and guitarist Mike Rutherford, guitarist Steve Hackett and drummer Phil Collins. They had played around 400 gigs in the UK, but had yet to achieve commercial success. However, they had become popular abroad. Their 1970 album Trespass had reached No. 1 in Belgium, while 1971's Nursery Cryme had reached No. 11 in Italy. The Italian leg of the tour in April saw Genesis play to large and enthusiastic crowds, which gave the band a new sense of their audience appeal.

In May, Genesis performed a set at the Great Western Festival in Lincoln. Gabriel appeared wearing a jewelled Egyptian collar, black eye makeup, and had shaved the front of his head, which drew attention from the press, while the fact that the set included the first public performance of "Watcher of the Skies" went unnoticed. The music press's fixation on the non-musical elements of Genesis's shows would be an ongoing trend. Genesis continued to tour England extensively throughout June and July, as well as playing their first shows in the Netherlands, while simultaneously dedicating time to write and rehearse new material for a new studio album. Hackett considered leaving the band after feeling "fairly shattered" by the lengthy tour, but his bandmates persuaded him to stay.

== Production ==
=== Recording ===
Initial rehearsals were held in a rehearsal space at Blackheath in London before they relocated to a space underneath the Una Billings School of Dance in Shepherd's Bush. Some material Hackett used for his first solo album, Voyage of the Acolyte, was rehearsed by Genesis during the Foxtrot sessions but not used on the album. Material that became "Watcher of the Skies" and "Can-Utility and the Coastliners" was performed live before recording of Foxtrot started.

Genesis recorded Foxtrot in August 1972 at Island Studios in London. The recording sessions were sporadic, taking place during the brief intervals between tour dates. Genesis were set to record with producer John Anthony, who had worked with them on their previous two albums and on their new single "Happy the Man" in March, but escalating costs due to the slow progress of completing it caused disagreement between Anthony and Charisma Records, the group's label, so they looked for a new producer. Banks recalled that Charisma was anxious for the group to make a hit recording. Contrarily, Hackett's recollection was that Charisma's owner, Tony Stratton Smith, approved their making the rise to fame slowly and was willing to allow them "many, many albums to make it." Charisma's first choice for producer was Bob Potter, a young engineer who was still learning the particulars of music production but had assisted producer Bob Johnston on the recent hit album Fog on the Tyne by Charisma labelmates Lindisfarne.

The band did not get on with Potter because he disliked their music, comparing Banks's Mellotron opening to "Watcher of the Skies" to the soundtrack to the science fiction film 2001: A Space Odyssey, and felt that the song was better without it. Potter was also aggravated about how long the band took to set up to record. The unproductive sessions were curtailed, and the band toured in Italy from 15 to 23 August 1972, before resuming work on the album at the end of the month. Potter ultimately went uncredited on the album, though Hackett has said that a substantial part of "Supper's Ready" and the entirety of "Horizons" were completed with Potter as producer. The group tried promoting the engineer at the sessions, Tony Platt, to producer, but that was abandoned owing to personality clashes. Smith then asked Dave Hitchcock to produce the album, in part because he had experience with recording epic suites like "Supper's Ready", specifically, the track "Nine Feet Underground" from In the Land of Grey and Pink by Caravan. Hitchcock was unfamiliar with Platt and preferred to have an engineer who he had worked well with in the past, so he replaced Platt with John Burns. Genesis approved of the change in engineers, with Banks later commenting: "We weren't too sure about [Platt] either." Burns continued to work with Genesis on their next three albums. Banks disliked Hitchcock's production work.

During the album's sessions, Genesis recorded the live favourite "Twilight Alehouse", which had been written and performed when founding member and guitarist Anthony Phillips was in the band (a short instrumental excerpt of the song appears on their debut album From Genesis to Revelation between "Fireside Song" and "The Serpent"). However, Genesis decided "Twilight Alehouse" was inferior to the newer material and kept it off the final track list, though Banks said in 2012 that, in retrospect, it was better than most of the songs which ended up on the album. It was put out as a limited single by ZigZag magazine and the band's fan club in 1973 and as the B-side to "I Know What I Like (In Your Wardrobe)" in 1974. A piece devised by Rutherford and rehearsed by the band in a 3/4 time signature was not used, but it was adapted by Hackett into "Shadow of the Hierophant" on Voyage of the Acolyte. Hackett presented an early version of his song "The Hermit", but the group passed on it. It would also be included on Voyage of the Acolyte. The group tried an early take of "Firth of Fifth" but it failed to inspire their interest. Banks worked on it over the course of the following year and it was released on their next album, Selling England by the Pound. When Smith heard the album for the first time, he said to the band's friend and roadie Richard Macphail: "This is the one that makes their career". Smith added: "I had to wipe a tear from my eye. Everything that one had believed about the band had come through". Banks was particularly pleased with Foxtrot which he thought contained no weak tracks.

=== Songs ===
==== Side one ====
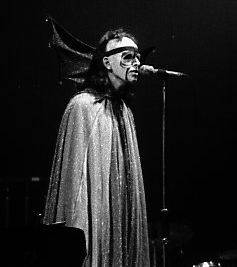
Peter Gabriel singing "Watcher of the Skies" on tour

"Watcher of the Skies" takes its title from a line of the 1817 sonnet On First Looking into Chapman's Homer by John Keats. The song begins with a solo played on a Mellotron that the band had bought from King Crimson. Banks was "searching for chords that actually sounded good ... because of its tuning problems" and settled on the opening two chords "that sounded great ... There was an atmosphere about them". The tremendous power the chords had when played at the Palazzo dello sport, Pesaro and Palasaport, Reggio Emilia during soundchecks on 11 and 12 April 1972, during their first Italian tour, convinced Genesis that they should be used in a song. The lyrics were written by Rutherford and Banks in Naples on 19 April, inspired by the view from the roof of their hotel, the Domitiana, overlooking the Mostra d'Oltremare. They wondered what an empty Earth would look like if surveyed by an alien visitor. Banks described them as "a sort of sci-fi fantasy" inspired by the novel Childhood's End (1953) by Arthur C. Clarke, and the Watcher race of extraterrestrials featured in the Marvel Comics. Rutherford thought they were "interesting words but they didn't sing very well", and Banks concurred that "some of the vocal parts are a bit embarrassing." The verse/chorus sections of the song were initiated by Collins, who wrote a staccato rhythm in 6/4 that he wanted to sound like Morse code. Collins felt the need to bring in "some tricky arrangements" into the song's rhythm from seeing Yes perform live. Gabriel wrote some of the melodies in the verses and chorus, and Hackett came up with the idea of having a section where the 6/4 rhythm plays without accompaniment, first very softly and then very loudly.

"Time Table" features a romantic theme that yearns for tradition, decency, and an age of kings and queens that is banished by war and conflict. It is one of the few Genesis songs from this period which was not collaboratively written; Banks wrote and presented the song as a complete piece and had the band perform it. The distinctive sound of the piano lead in the chorus was created by picking the strings with a plectrum, thereby emulating the mechanism of a harpsichord. Melody Maker's Chris Welch described the track as light relief and a "gentle but stirring pop song" after the "pounding excitement" of "Watcher of the Skies". Gabriel biographer Daryl Easlea considered the song the most overlooked from the Gabriel-era of the band's history with its "sweet and touching" flavour and its resemblance to Genesis songs of the late 1970s.

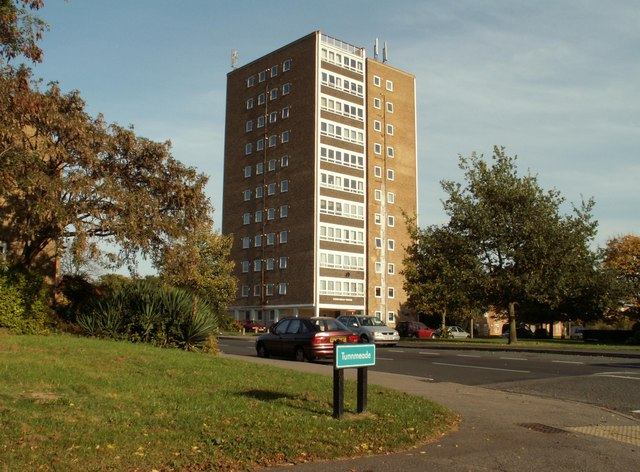
"Get 'Em Out by Friday" involved relocating tenants from London to Harlow New Town.

"Get 'Em Out by Friday" is a song described as a "comic opera" that Gabriel described as "part social comment, part prophetic". The opening instrumental section consists of fragments from "The Movement", a never-recorded epic song dating back to when Anthony Phillips was in the group. The rest of the music was written by the group collectively and recorded without any lyrics or vocal parts; though Gabriel sometimes sang during writing sessions for the song, his vocals were drowned out by the other members due to the mediocre PA of the rehearsal room, according to Collins. During recording of the instrumental tracks, Scottish musician Donovan came into the studio and remarked that the part where Gabriel and Banks harmonize on flute and Mellotron-flute respectively sounded like endless rows of houses. The resulting lyrics were partly inspired by Gabriel's own landlord problems he was having with his apartment on Campden Hill Road, stories about notorious landlord Peter Rachman, and a television documentary he had seen about housing in the borough of Islington. Similar to "Harold the Barrel" and "The Fountain of Salmacis" from Nursery Cryme, the song features characters with Gabriel adopting a different vocal style for each one, but this time each character also has their own musical theme. The track features four characters: John Pebble, a business man of Styx Enterprises; Mark Hall (aka The Winkler), an employee of Styx who evicts tenants; Mrs. Barrow, a tenant of a house owned by Pebble; and Joe Ordinary, a customer in a pub. The song starts with Hall informing Mrs. Barrow that her property has been purchased and must be evicted, but she refuses to leave, leaving Pebble to raise her rent. Hall then offers Mrs. Barrow £400 to move to a new property in Harlow New Town, which she does, before Pebble raises her rent again. After an instrumental section, the date is 18 September 2012 and Genetic Control announce on a Dial-A-Program television service its decision to shorten the height of all humans to 4 ft. Joe reasons this so housing blocks will be able to accommodate twice as many people. Rutherford and Collins singled out "Get 'Em Out by Friday" as one of the early Genesis songs that suffered from Genesis's dense music and practice of recording tracks without any vocals to start with, which made the track busy and crowded when the vocals were added, while Gabriel instead felt the problem was that his lyrics were "too wordy". Rutherford, however, considered the lyrics to be among Gabriel's best. Steve Hackett's brother John has claimed he wrote the guitar figure for the passage beginning "After all this time".

"Can-Utility and the Coastliners" preceded the album writing sessions. It made its live debut on the afternoon of 9 April 1972, at San Martino Buon Albergo, under the title "Rock Me Baby". By the 14th of that same month, it had been renamed "Bye-Bye Johnny". Hackett recounted that he wrote everything in the song up to 1:45 in and the closing vocal melody, and Rutherford wrote the guitar break and came up with the idea of the bass remaining silent from 3:44–4:00. Collins said he recalls writing part of the song but could not remember which part, though Hackett remarked that the instrumental parts of the closing (from 5:17 onward) sound like Collins's work. The organ and Mellotron playing together was inspired by "Wreck of the Hesperus" by Procol Harum (one of Genesis's major inspirations) from their album A Salty Dog (1969). The lyrics are based on King Canute and his inability to hold back the incoming tide. Hackett, who wrote the lyrics, said that he was drawn to Canute because he seemed the complete opposite of the self-aggrandizing attitude typical of world leaders. However, Welch theorised that the song may be in fact about Gabriel and the idea of a singer growing wary of his role and his flattering admirers.

==== Side two ====
Side two begins with "Horizons", a short guitar instrumental performed by Hackett that was recorded in the short time that Potter was the album's producer. It was written in the course of a year, and took musical inspiration from the Prelude of Suite No. 1 in G major, BWV 1007 for cello by Bach. He presented the piece to the group at a rehearsal on an electric guitar, though he had written it on a steel-string acoustic. He said that he was not sure it was right for Genesis because it was a solo piece, and initially thought the band would reject it. Hackett remembered Collins saying that there should be applause added to the end of the piece, and felt surprised when the band agreed to include it on the album. Hackett wrote it with English composers of the Tudor period in mind, including William Byrd, who often composed very short pieces, and a piece by Julian Bream. He pointed out the common mistake adopted by some listeners that "Horizons" was an opening to "Supper's Ready", but it did not bother him.

The rest of the second side contains "Supper's Ready", a 23-minute track formed of seven parts and the longest the band recorded. Gabriel believed the band's growing support as a live act gave them the confidence to start writing extended pieces. The song and its theme of good versus evil was inspired by an experience Gabriel and his then-wife Jill had with Anthony at Kensington Palace, when she reportedly entered a trance state as the room's windows suddenly blew open. Gabriel compared the ordeal to a scene from "a Hammer Horror film". Initially, the song took form as an acoustic track similar to "Stagnation" from Trespass or "The Musical Box" from Nursery Cryme, something the band wished to avoid repeating. To develop the piece further, Gabriel pitched his idea for what became the song's fifth section, titled "Willow Farm", on the piano. Banks noted the change from the song's more romantic introduction into "Willow Farm", with its "ugly chord sequence", worked as it took the song "into another dimension". Genesis went to the street and picked eight children to record vocals for the song and paid them ten 'bob' (shillings) each. "Apocalypse in 9/8" was improvised by Banks, Rutherford and Collins, with Hackett later layering guitar parts on top of it. It is a mostly instrumental performed in a 9/8 time signature that began with Rutherford playing his bass pedals which Collins recalled as "totally abstract with no time signature" and incorporated a drum pattern to it. Banks assumed his organ solo would have no vocals, but after Gabriel proceeded to record lyrics over it, something that he disagreed with initially, he said, "it only took about ten seconds to think 'This sounds fantastic, it's so strong'". Banks picked "Apocalypse in 9/8" and "As Sure as Eggs Is Eggs" as "the best piece of composition" Genesis recorded during Gabriel's tenure as lead singer, but thought Gabriel had written the lyrics too quickly. Collins supported this view, who recalled Gabriel rushing to get them written while the backing tracks were being recorded.

=== Sleeve design ===
The album's cover was the last of three Genesis releases designed by Paul Whitehead, following Trespass and Nursery Cryme. He was a former art director for Time Out and gained inspiration from the lyrics to "Supper's Ready", which alludes to the apocalypse. Whitehead wanted to present the Four Horsemen of the Apocalypse in an original way but it turned into something "a little more whimsical", with two horse riders being a monkey and an alien. The cover for Nursery Cryme had depicted croquet which represented the English upper class which Whitehead repeated on Foxtrot with the depiction of fox hunting. The croquet scene is also repeated, placed in the background which has the Victorian manor now replaced with a hole in the ground. Whitehead devised the album's title, which he had done for Trespass and Nursery Cryme as he recalled the group were stuck for ideas. He had heard the word "foxy", an American slang term for an attractive woman, during a visit in the United States, and "Foxy Lady" by The Jimi Hendrix Experience, which he used as inspiration to draw a female with a fox head. Whitehead's original illustrations for the three albums were stolen from the Charisma archives when it was sold to Virgin Records in 1983. Whitehead claimed that Charisma staff got wind of the imminent sale and proceeded to loot its office.

The band disliked the cover. Gabriel felt less pleased with the design than Whitehead's previous works. Hackett felt "unsure" about the cover when he saw it for the first time, calling it a "strange" design that has made more sense to him over time. Banks thought it was the weakest cover Whitehead designed for Genesis. Rutherford felt the design was a decline in quality following the "lovely atmosphere" of the Trespass and Nursery Cryme covers, saying the Foxtrot cover was "a little bit weak". Collins thought it was not "particularly special" and lacked a professional look.

== Release ==
Foxtrot was released in September 1972. "Watcher of the Skies" was re-recorded in a shorter version for a US single.

It became the band's highest-charting album at the time of its release, peaking at No. 12 for a seven-week run on the UK Albums Chart. Like their previous three albums, Foxtrot failed to chart in the United States. It reached No. 1 in Italy, signifying their growth in popularity in Europe after Trespass had topped the charts in Belgium. Foxtrot is certified silver by the British Phonographic Industry (BPI) for shipments of 60,000 units.

=== Critical reception ===
Professional ratings
Review scores
Source	Rating
AllMusic	5/5 stars
BBC Music	(favourable)
Christgau's Record Guide	C
The Rolling Stone Album Guide	3/5 stars
The Daily Vault	A−

Initial reception for this album was mixed. Robert Christgau gave the album a "C". In his review for Sounds magazine, Jerry Gilbert thought Genesis "almost achieved the perfect album". At times he noticed "the overall sound does lack the required vitality" and moments where the band "are trying just that little bit too hard", but such moments "are sporadic", and considered it more interesting than Trespass and Nursery Cryme. Welch thought Foxtrot was "a milestone in the group's career", "an important point of development in British group music", and that the band had reached "a creative peak". A short critical review from Rich Aregood in the Philadelphia Daily News read: "Genesis still has trouble putting songs together, but they play and sing beautifully."

Retrospective reviews of the album have been more positive. Stephen Thomas Erlewine said Foxtrot was "the first time that Genesis attacked like a rock band". François Couture, on AllMusic, described "Supper's Ready" as the band's "undisputed masterpiece". BBC Music gave a favourable review, liking the production but feeling the lyrics had dated. The Rolling Stone Record Guide gave the album three stars (out of five) in its 1979 first edition, then dropped it in its 2nd edition in 1983 when the album went out of issue.

In 2015, the album was ranked no. 14 in Rolling Stone magazine's list of the 50 Greatest Prog Rock Albums of All Time. XTC guitarist Dave Gregory said: "To this day Foxtrot is a magical album. "Supper's Ready" became like an addiction. It had such a great sound, and enough mystery to make you want to hear it over and over again ... To this day, I will never tire of it". Faith No More bassist Bill Gould named it one of the ten albums that changed his life.

In 2023, Sean Murphy of PopMatters included the album in his list of the best progressive rock albums of the "classic era". He wrote that the album is "where Peter Gabriel made his play for the whackiest and most wonderful frontman in the crowded prog circus." According to him, "Supper's Ready" is considered by many fans to be the "ultimate Genesis song, if not the apotheosis of progressive rock." Keyboardist Tony Banks has described the record as his "favourite" of the early albums.

=== Reissues ===
Foxtrot was re-released in 1994 as a digitally remastered CD issued by Virgin. As part of the band's box set Genesis 1970–1975 released in 2008, Foxtrot was reissued as a hybrid CD/Super Audio CD with a new stereo and 5.1 surround sound mix with a DVD of previously unreleased bonus material. The reissue includes sleeve notes written by Queen drummer Roger Taylor. Later in 2014, Foxtrot was reissued on a remastered 180 gram LP and remastered CD by Rhino Records, Atlantic Records, and Charisma Records.

=== Tour ===
Whereas Genesis's previous tours had featured setlists that varied from show to show, the tour which followed the recording of Foxtrot had a relatively stable setlist; from September through early November it usually consisted of "Watcher of the Skies", "Can-Utility and the Coastliners", "Get 'Em Out by Friday", "The Musical Box", "The Return of the Giant Hogweed" and "The Knife", with occasional performances of "Twilight Alehouse" and "The Fountain of Salmacis". On 10 November they performed "Supper's Ready" live for the first time, and to make room for its inclusion in concerts, "Can-Utility and the Coastliners" (a song which Genesis felt had never worked well live) was permanently dropped from the set.

On 28 September 1972, Genesis played a gig at the National Stadium, Dublin. During the last song, "The Musical Box", Gabriel disappeared during the instrumental section, and re-appeared wearing his wife's red dress and a fox's head, mimicking Foxtrot's front cover. He had not told his bandmates he would do this, but he appeared in this getup on the front cover of Melody Maker, raising the band's profile. The album entered the UK Albums Charts at No. 12 on 14 October 1972 due in large part from this exposure in the music press.

The tour covered Europe and North America between September 1972 and May 1973. It opened with a UK leg with Lindisfarne as co-headliners. The group played their first US shows during the tour, including a warm up show at Brandeis University in Waltham, Massachusetts followed by a gig at Philharmonic Hall in New York City with String Driven Thing in December 1972. The latter was in benefit for the United Cerebral Palsy Fund. Despite the band's critical opinion of the concert due to a lack of rehearsal time, technical problems, and a perceived unenthusiastic audience, it went down well with the crowd that requested more Genesis songs be played on local radio stations, thus increasing their exposure.

A later UK leg, again with String Driven Thing as the support act, included two shows (Manchester on 24 February 1973 and Leicester on the 25th) which were recorded and used as the source for Genesis's first live album, Genesis Live.

== Track listing ==
All songs written by Tony Banks, Phil Collins, Peter Gabriel, Steve Hackett, and Mike Rutherford.

Side one
No.	Title	Length
1.	"Watcher of the Skies"	7:24
2.	"Time Table"	4:47
3.	"Get 'Em Out by Friday"	8:38
4.	"Can-Utility and the Coastliners"	5:48
Total length:		26:37

Side two
No.	Title	Length
1.	"Horizons"	1:42
2.	"Supper's Ready" a. "Lover's Leap" b. "The Guaranteed Eternal Sanctuary Man" c. "Ikhnaton and Itsacon and Their Band of Merry Men" d. "How Dare I Be So Beautiful?" e. "Willow Farm" f. "Apocalypse in 9/8 (Co-Starring the Delicious Talents of Gabble Ratchet)" g. "As Sure as Eggs Is Eggs (Aching Men's Feet)"	22:54
Total length:		24:36

== Personnel ==
Credits are adapted from the album's 1972 liner notes.

Genesis

- Tony Banks – Hammond organ, Mellotron, electric and acoustic pianos, 12-string guitar, backing vocals
- Steve Hackett – electric guitar, 6-string guitar, 12-string guitar
- Phil Collins – drums, backing vocals, percussion
- Peter Gabriel – lead vocals, flute, bass drum, tambourine, oboe
- Mike Rutherford – bass guitar, bass pedals, cello, 12-string guitar, backing vocals

Production

- David Hitchcock – production
- John Burns – engineer
- Richard Macphail – technician, stage sound (sound friend)
- Paul Whitehead – sleeve design
- Armando Gallo – photography
- Barry Wentzell – photography
- Geoff Terrill – photography
- Martin Nunn – photography

== Charts ==
Chart (1972)	Peak position
French Albums (SNEP)	15
German Albums (Offizielle Top 100)	45
Italian Albums (Musica e dischi)	15
UK Albums (Official Charts)	12

Chart (2014)	Peak position
UK Rock & Metal Albums (Official Charts)	14

== Certifications ==
Region	Certification	Certified units/sales
France (SNEP)	Gold	100,000^{*}
United Kingdom (BPI) original release	Gold	100,000^{^}
United Kingdom (BPI) release of 2009	Gold	100,000^{‡}
^{*} Sales figures based on certification alone.^{^} Shipments figures based on certification alone.^{‡} Sales+streaming figures based on certification alone.
