= Garden Wall (disambiguation) =

Garden Wall may refer to:

- Garden Wall, an arête in Glacier National Park, Montana, United States
- Garden Wall (band), British band, one of two bands that joined to become Genesis

== See also ==
- Garden wall bond, in brickwork
- Gardenwall, a house in Minneapolis, Minnesota, United States
