= Richard Macphail =

English musician and road manager (1950–2024)

- Born: Richard Paul Macphail; 17 September 1950; Bedford, Bedfordshire, England
- Died: 26 August 2024 (aged 73) London, England
- Instrument: Vocals
- Formerly of: Anon

Richard Paul Macphail (17 September 1950 – 26 August 2024) was an English musician, road manager and business owner, best known for his relationship with the rock band Genesis from their formation in 1967 to 1973.

== Early life ==
Macphail was born in Bedford, Bedfordshire, on 17 September 1950, the third child of David Macphail and Mary (nee Ward) who married in 1941. His father was a senior executive in the food industry working in Brazil, and Macphail's parents returned to England for his birth to be registered in the UK. He grew up in Bramley, near Guildford, Surrey, and was educated at Aldro school in Shackleford, Charterhouse School in Godalming, Surrey, and Millfield.

== Genesis ==
At Charterhouse, under the influence of Beatlemania, Macphail neglected his studies and became the singer in a student band, Anon, which included housemates Anthony Phillips and Mike Rutherford. Other Charterhouse pupils, among them Peter Gabriel and Tony Banks, formed a band called Garden Wall, and at the end of summer term 1966 Macphail persuaded the headmaster to let the two bands play a school concert together. The bands later merged and became Genesis, but by then Macphail's parents, who had wanted him to become a lawyer or a doctor, had removed him from the school and transferred him to Millfield. At Millfield he formed another band, the Austin Hippy Blues Band, with Harry Williamson, son of Tarka the Otter author Henry Williamson (who later wrote and performed music with Macphail's old bandmate and original Genesis guitarist, Anthony Phillips).

By the time the Charterhouse musicians recorded their debut album as Genesis in 1968, Macphail had been sent to a kibbutz in Israel by his parents. When he returned to Britain he reconnected with Genesis and helped Gabriel to set up meetings with record labels and promoters, from which they won a six-weeks residency at Ronnie Scott's jazz club in Soho, London, and a recording contract with record label Charisma. The band spent months rehearsing in an empty cottage in Surrey owned by Macphail's parents and developing their prog-rock sound.

Macphail was the band's one-man road crew and tour manager from 1969 until 1973. He drove them to gigs and set up the gear, first in Britain and then on tour in Europe and the US. His parents conceded that managing a rock band was a more respectable occupation than being a pop star, and his father obtained an old bread van from his company for them to use as transport. Macphail was also the band's support at difficult moments: he persuaded them not to split up when original guitarist Anthony Phillips quit after a gig in London one night in 1970, and Gabriel said that he had frequently bailed them out of difficult situations. He became, in effect, the sixth member of Genesis and was credited as such in the artwork of the band's 1970 album Trespass. He is credited as "sound friend" in the liner notes to their fourth album Foxtrot (1972) (Note: Because Macphail is listed and pictured among the band members in the original credits for Foxtrot, he has sometimes been mistakenly credited as a co-writer of that album's songs - for example, on the European Rock Theatre compilation.) and when he left, the band marked his departure on the sleeve of their first live album, Genesis Live (1973), with the words: "Dedicated to Richard Macphail, who left in 1973."

He returned to Genesis a year later when the band lost their lighting engineer as they were about to start a US tour and Macphail, although he knew little about stage lighting, stepped in and learned the job. Macphail worked with Genesis once more as road manager in 1976 for their A Trick of the Tail Tour, and with former Genesis singer Peter Gabriel as tour manager when he launched his solo career in 1977 and 1978. Macphail briefly managed Van Morrison and was Leonard Cohen's tour manager in Europe in 1979.

== Other projects ==
Macphail ended his musical career with a band called Legion in 1981, which featured him as lead vocalist. Legion played a short four-date tour that year supporting American band Spirit, which included a gig at Friars in Aylesbury which was opened by Marillion. In 1992 he sang backing vocals on Gabriel's single "Digging in the Dirt".

In 2016, Macphail worked as a DJ on Meridian Radio in London, and followed this with his own on-line radio station, Radio Rich Pickings.

Outside of music, Macphail worked with environmental and ecological organisations including Gentle Ghost, which provided courses in among other things, carpentry and yoga, and for a while he ran a vegetarian restaurant. After semi-retiring he ran his own energy advice company, Optima Energy, from the beginning of the 1980s until his retirement in 2015 and continued to make occasional appearances at Genesis conventions.

A book describing Macphail's time with Genesis, My Book of Genesis, with co-author Chris Charlesworth, was published in 2017.

== Personal life ==
Macphail married world-renowned musician Maggie Cole, known for the harpsichord, fortepiano and piano. His great grand daughter is the British actress, director and writer Verity Drew Firth.

== Death ==
Richard Macphail died unexpectedly at home in London on 26 August 2024, at the age of 73. He was survived by his American-born wife Maggie Cole, a teacher at London's Guildhall School of Music and Drama and harpsichordist with the Britten Sinfonia who he married in London in 1981. A post-mortem confirmed he died of heart disease with diabetes also being a contributing factor.
