= Luxford House =

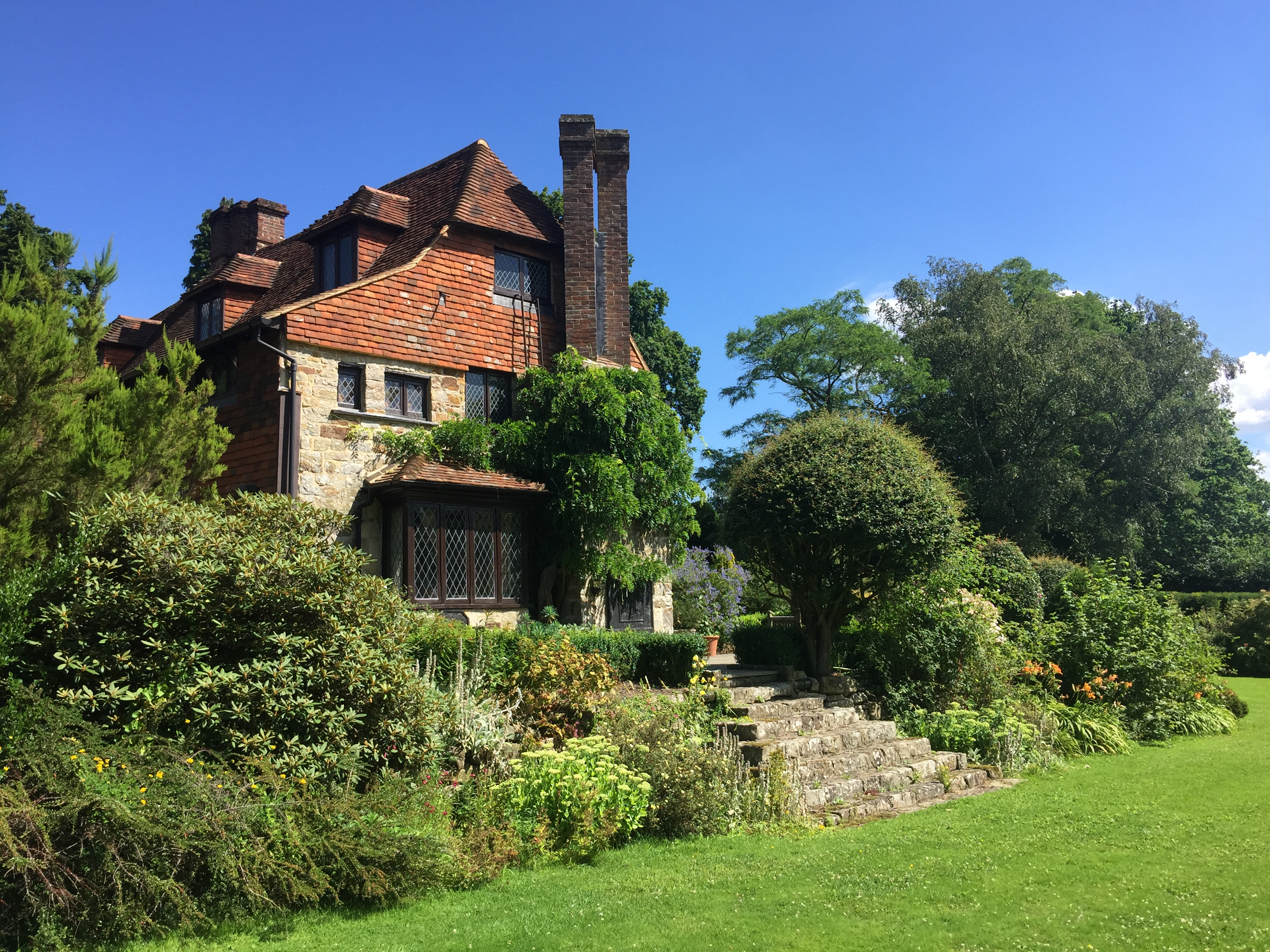
- South elevation

- Location within East Sussex
- 51°02′39″N 0°10′23″E
- Location: Crowborough
- OS grid reference: TQ 52433 29432

History
- Built: 16th century

Site notes
- Area: East Sussex

Listed Building – Grade II
- Official name: Luxford House
- Designated: 26 November 1953
- Reference no.: 1028448

Luxford House is a 16th-century Grade II listed building in Crowborough, East Sussex. It is near the 11.5-acre (4.7 ha) Luxford Farm. It was used by several rock musicians in the 1970s under the guidance of Tony Stratton Smith.

== History ==
Luxford house was constructed in the early 16th century as a smoke bay house. During the 1930s it was bought by Sir Hugh Beaver, former Ministry of Works director general and founder of the Guinness Book of Records, who renovated and extended it. It was Grade II listed on 26 November 1953.

Following Beaver's death in 1967, ownership of the house passed to his daughter Cerise and son-in-law, Rev Christopher Lawson-Tancred. It was let to rock music manager Tony Stratton Smith who lived there through the early 1970s. He encouraged groups signed to his label, Charisma Records, including Genesis and Van der Graaf Generator, to rehearse there.

Genesis wrote their 1971 album Nursery Cryme at Luxford House that summer. A picture of Van der Graaf Generator taken at the house appeared on the inner gatefold sleeve of their 1971 album Pawn Hearts, and the cover of Neil Diamond's album Stones also uses a picture taken on the property—of a stone wall—as its cover. Bert Jansch recorded his 1974 album L.A. Turnaround at Luxford House, using the library as the live room, and made a promotional video featuring the premises.

In December 2017, the property and estate was put up for sale.

== Architecture ==
Luxford house is set in a 4,500 square feet (420 m^{2}) estate with several lawns and gardens. The house features six bedrooms and a gym/studio constructed of Wealden stone.

The exterior is timber-framed with plaster infilling, supported by a set of diagonal braces on the first floor and covered with a tile roof.
