= Get 'Em Out by Friday =

"Get ’Em Out by Friday"

Song by Genesis

from the album Foxtrot
- Released: 6 October 1972
- Recorded: August 1972
- Genre: Progressive rock; experimental rock
- Length: 8:37
- Songwriters: Tony Banks, Phil Collins, Peter Gabriel, Steve Hackett, Mike Rutherford

"Get 'Em Out by Friday" is a rock song on the 1972 album Foxtrot written and performed by British progressive rock band Genesis, lasting eight and a half minutes. It also appears on their 1973 live album. The lyrics were written by lead singer Peter Gabriel. The song takes the form of a futuristic play set initially in the present but ending in 2012. Like several previous Genesis songs (the 1968 non-album B-side "One-Eyed Hound", "White Mountain" from Trespass, and "Harold the Barrel" and "The Fountain of Salmacis" from Nursery Cryme), the song's lyrics are split between different characters, with lead singer Peter Gabriel often adapting a different vocal style to each character.

The song uses elements of science fiction as a means of social criticism on the corporate greed and oppression of the UK's private landlords in the 1960s and 1970s, epitomised by Peter Rachman who used "winkling" (a mixture of threats and inducements) to remove tenants on low rents from properties and enable their profitable reletting or redevelopment. Social commentary was an evident theme throughout Genesis's early work.

== Plot ==
The play contains three main characters:

- John Pebble: A business man of Styx Enterprises. Near the end of the song, he has been knighted and works for United Blacksprings International.
- Mark Hall (also known as "The Winkler"): A man who works for Styx Enterprises and has the task of evicting tenants.
- Mrs Barrow: a tenant in a house in Harlow, purchased by Pebble.

The song starts with a fast-paced refrain of Pebble ordering Hall to "Get 'em out by Friday". In the following stanza, the Winkler tells a disbelieving Mrs Barrow that a firm of men has purchased her property and that she has been evicted. She refuses to leave, so Pebble raises the rent on the property. In lieu of this, the Winkler offers £400 for Mrs Barrow to move; she does, albeit grudgingly. Shortly after Mrs Barrow moves in, however, Pebble again raises the rent.

A slow instrumental section indicates a passage of time, taking the story to the year 2012. At this time, Genetic Control has announced that they are restricting the height of all humans to four feet. This piece of news is then discussed in a pub by a man named "Joe Everybody," who reveals the reason behind the restriction: so that Genetic Control, who has recently bought some properties, will be able to accommodate twice as many people in the same tower block.

The penultimate stanza is that of Pebble, now knighted, repeating the process for the same set of properties that Mrs Barrow was pressured into moving to. The last stanza is a "Memo from Satin Peter." (Note: The album's lyric sheet has "Satin" either as a misprint or as a Peter Gabriel wordplay on Saint Peter.)

With land in your hand, you'll be happy on earth
then invest in the Church for your heaven.

== Reception ==
The song was generally well-received; Rutherford commented that the lyrics were the best that Gabriel had written while AllMusic cited the song as "the truest sign Genesis has grown muscle without abandoning the whimsy".

In the late seventies, "Get 'Em Out by Friday" was adapted into a comic by French cartoonist Jean Solé. The lyrics were translated by newswriter Alain Dister, and the art includes some additional drawings by famous cartoonist Gotlib. This adaptation was published in the comic magazine Fluide Glacial.
