= Meridian Radio =

Coordinates: 51.4771°N 0.0496°E

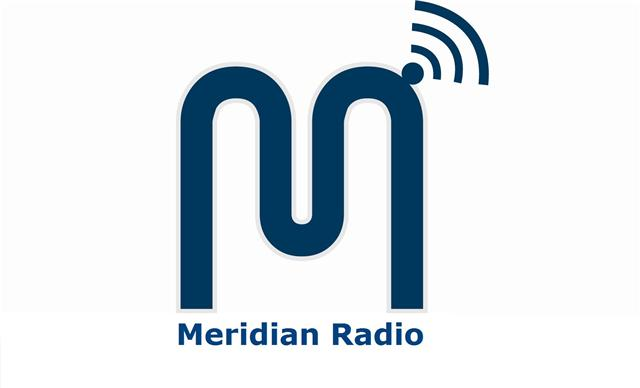
- South East London; England
- Broadcast area: Queen Elizabeth Hospital, London
- Frequency: Online/Internal Cable system

Links
- Webcast: http://s2.xrad.io/play/?id=M02
- Website: http://www.meridianradio.co.uk/

Meridian Radio is the working name of the Woolwich Hospitals Broadcasting Service. It is a hospital based community radio station providing entertainment and information to the patients and staff of the Lewisham Woolwich and Greenwich NHS Trust based at Queen Elizabeth Hospital in Woolwich. It was established from the merger of two radio stations in 1972, becoming the Woolwich Hospitals Broadcasting Service. The on air name of the station became Meridian Radio in 2001 following the station moving to new studios on Woolwich Common.

The station operates from studios in the Conference Centre at the Queen Elizabeth Hospital, broadcasting 24 hours a day, with live programmes daily. The station is available online at www.meridianradio.co.uk and on Hospedia Channel 1 at Woolwich's Queen Elizabeth Hospital.

Meridian Radio launched a new logo in June 2010 and in September 2010 launched a brand new on air identity, produced by Bespoke Music. The new identity launched at 10am on Sunday 26 September.

A New website was launched on 2 October 2011, with added features including an extensive what's on guide for the local area and a shop, where all purchases contribute to Meridian Radio's charity fundraising.

On Saturday 21 July Meridian Radio launched its online webcast to coincide with the arrival of the Olympic Flame in Greenwich. A special programme with live reports from around the Royal Borough of Greenwich was the first programme broadcast online from 6am. The station is now aimed at a wider south east London audience.

Meridian Radio is a registered charity and member of the Hospital Broadcasting Association, HBA.
