= Watcher of the Skies =

1972 song by Genesis

Single by Genesis

from the album Foxtrot
- B-side: "Willow Farm"
- Released: February 1973
- Recorded: August 1972
- Genre: Progressive rock
- Length: 7:23; 3:42 (single version)
- Label: Charisma/Phonogram (UK); Atlantic (U.S.)
- Songwriters: Tony Banks, Phil Collins, Peter Gabriel, Steve Hackett, Mike Rutherford
- Producer: David Hitchcock

Genesis singles chronology
"Happy the Man" / "Seven Stones" (1972)	"Watcher of the Skies" / "Willow Farm" (1973)	"I Know What I Like (In Your Wardrobe)" (1973)

Official audio
- "Watcher of the Skies" on YouTube

"Watcher of the Skies" is the first track on the English progressive rock band Genesis' fourth studio album Foxtrot (1972). It was also released as the album's only single. The song was re-recorded in 1972 in a radically altered and shortened single version. This version was re-released in 1998 as part of the Genesis Archive 1967–75 box set.

== Background ==
The title is borrowed from John Keats' 1817 poem "On First Looking into Chapman's Homer":

Then felt I like some watcher of the skies

When a new planet swims into his ken;

The song was frequently used to open the group's live performances and features as the first track on their 1973 live album Genesis Live. According to Tony Banks, the introductory section was intended to take advantage of idiosyncrasies in the tuning of the Mellotron model he was using at the time:

It was intentionally melodramatic to conjure up an impression of incredible size. It was an extraordinary sound. On the old Mellotron Mark 2 there were these two chords that sounded really good on that instrument. There are some chords you can't play on that instrument because they'd be so out of tune. These chords created an incredible atmosphere. That's why it's just an incredible intro number. It never sounded so good on the later Mellotron.

The two chords in question are Bmaj7/F# and C#/F#. The long keyboard introduction crossfades into the main ensemble section, which features a prominent single-note staccato pattern in a 6/4 time signature played over a pattern of sustained organ chords. Following the vocal sections of the song, there is an unusual polyrhythm part, where the staccato riff changes to 8/4 time, played against a Mellotron/organ chord part in 6/4.

The lyrics were written by Banks and Mike Rutherford during a soundcheck for a gig in Naples. While they were surveying the deserted landscape of the airfield where they were rehearsing, they wondered what an empty Earth would look like in this state if surveyed by an alien visitor. The lyrics were influenced by the Arthur C. Clarke 1953 science fiction novel Childhood's End and the science fiction characters the Watchers.

The song title was used in naming of the tribute album Watcher of the Skies: Genesis Revisited (1996) by ex-Genesis member Steve Hackett. On the album, the lead vocal was provided by John Wetton. In the liner notes to the album, Hackett wrote:

I remember pushing the band to acquire a Mellotron back in the '70s and, luckily, King Crimson had one to spare at the time – the 'Black Bitch' I think they called it on account of it always breaking down ... This song alone was a strong reason for re-approaching the early material – from Phil's inventive morse code rhythm to Tony's momentous introduction which always sounded best in Italy's Palasports – an aircraft hangar type of rumble ideally suited to spacecraft impersonation.

== Live performances ==
"Watcher of the Skies" opened the band's shows during 1972–74 and (in abridged form) remained a staple in the band's live set into the 1980s. In later years, it has been played in a medley following the track "It" (from 1974 The Lamb Lies Down on Broadway), as can be heard on Three Sides Live (1982). The song was never performed with lyrics after Peter Gabriel's departure.

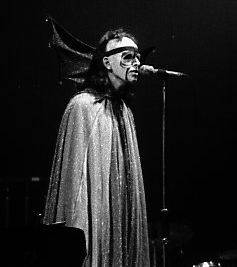
Gabriel performing "Watcher of the Skies" in Toronto, 1974.

The song was played live during the Foxtrot, Selling England by the Pound, The Lamb Lies Down on Broadway, A Trick of the Tail, and Three Sides Live tours. The band also played the song during an appearance on the January 25, 1974 episode of the U.S. TV series The Midnight Special. During performances, Peter Gabriel wore bat wings on the side of his head, glowing UV make-up around his eyes, and a multicoloured cape.

The song was performed live by Phish at the 2010 Rock & Roll Hall of Fame induction ceremony on 15 March 2010 at the Waldorf-Astoria hotel in New York City. The band also performed "No Reply at All" after Trey Anastasio's induction speech.

== Personnel ==
- Peter Gabriel – lead vocals, tambourine, bass drum
- Tony Banks – Hammond organ, Mellotron, backing vocals
- Steve Hackett – electric guitar
- Mike Rutherford – bass, bass pedals, backing vocals
- Phil Collins – drums, backing vocals
