= Dewtron =

Synthesizer manufacturer

Dewtron was the trade mark of Design Engineering (Wokingham) Ltd. or D. E. W. Ltd. a small British electronics manufacturer, founded by Brian H. Baily on 5 February 1964. In adverts the company address is always given as, Ringwood Road, Ferndown, Dorset, never Wokingham. (Note: The Electrical Review, Volume 176, Issues 10–18, 1965, p.94, lists a trade mark application: "Dewtron [...] portable radio receivers for improving reception of sound: transistors, valves, amplifiers and electrically controlled circuits situated in factories or buildings for use in the automatic control of industrial, commercial and other operations. Design Engineering (Wokingham) Ltd., 81 Rose Street, Wokingham, Berkshire.")

== Products ==
One of the earliest advertised Dewtron product was the Dewtron Wave Trap, a device to boost the reception of medium wave radio broadcasts, another was the Dewbox, a 2 inch by 2 1/2 inch plastic enclosure in variable lengths.

Later on Synthesizers were advertised either pre-built or as kits of resin potted modules. By 1970 the company's products included oscillators, voltage controlled amplifiers, sample and hold and envelope shapers. Chris Carter, later to form Throbbing Gristle, experimented with Dewtron kit-based synthesizers early in his music career, as did Chris Watson of Cabaret Voltaire. In 1973 Ian Craig Marsh, (a founding member of The Human League and later to form Heaven 17) built himself a Dewtron synthesiser.

The Dewtron Mister Bassman bass pedal synthesizer was used by Mike Rutherford on Genesis albums from Nursery Cryme (1971) onwards, before replacing it with a Moog Taurus I for the album A Trick of the Tail (1976). Yes' bassist Chris Squire and frontman Jon Anderson used similar units in live performances. John Paul Jones plays a Mister Bassman on Since I've Been Loving You on the album Led Zeppelin III.

== See also ==
- List of synthesizer manufacturers
