= The Musical Box (song) =

Song by Genesis

from the album Nursery Cryme
- Released: 12 November 1971
- Recorded: August 1971
- Genre: Progressive rock
- Length: 10:29
- Label: Charisma
- Songwriters: Tony Banks, Phil Collins, Peter Gabriel, Steve Hackett, Mike Rutherford
- Producer: John Anthony

Official audio
- "The Musical Box" on YouTube

"The Musical Box" is a song by English progressive rock band Genesis, which was originally released on their third studio album Nursery Cryme in 1971. The song is written in the key of F# major. This song is the longest song on the album at ten and a half minutes.

== Composition ==
Though credited solely to Banks/Collins/Gabriel/Hackett/Rutherford, "The Musical Box" began as an instrumental piece written by Mike Rutherford and Anthony Phillips called "F#" (later released as "Manipulation" on the Box Set remaster). The lyrics are based on a Victorian-style fairy tale written by Gabriel, about two children in a country house. The girl, Cynthia, kills the boy, Henry, by cleaving his head off with a croquet mallet. She later discovers Henry's musical box. When she opens it, "Old King Cole" plays, and Henry returns as a spirit, but starts aging very quickly. This causes him to experience a lifetime's sexual desire in a few moments, and he tries to persuade Cynthia to have sexual intercourse with him. However, the noise causes his nurse to arrive, and she throws the musical box at him, destroying them both. The album cover shows Cynthia holding a croquet mallet, with a few heads lying on the ground.

In a 2007 interview with Uncut Gabriel commented that the song was intended to demonstrate the band's capabilities at shifting between pastoral and grittier musical passages, saying that "people were always telling us we couldn't move from a folk mood into a rock mood, but that's what we were trying to do on "The Music Box". He added that the more rock-oriented sections were inspired by The Who and that he tried to convince Rutherford to play his guitar parts like Pete Townshend.

== Live ==
Starting with a performance in Dublin, Ireland on 28 September 1972, Peter Gabriel wore a fox's head and his wife's red dress while performing the last verse, resembling a character on the cover of their album "Foxtrot". The fox costume was replaced sometime in 1973 by a mask resembling an old man, as Gabriel would portray the character of Henry, emerging from The Musical Box and accosting Cynthia. "The Musical Box" was featured in their live repertoire up to Phil Collins's departure after the We Can't Dance tour in 1992, albeit with only the closing section being included as part of a medley. Between 1972 and 1975, on stage, Tony Banks played 12-string acoustic guitar during the 'Old King Cole' section, in duet with Rutherford, who played an electric archtop 12-string Rickenbacker guitar through until the end of the song. Hackett played electric guitar during the entire song.

The song was played live during the Trespass, Nursery Cryme, Foxtrot, Selling England by the Pound, The Lamb Lies Down on Broadway, Wind & Wuthering, Duke (two nights only), Genesis (1984 dates only), and We Can't Dance (as a medley) tours. On January 25, 1974 the band played the song during their appearance on the U.S. TV series The Midnight Special.

== Legacy ==
A Genesis tribute band, The Musical Box, is named after the song.

Brian May, guitarist with Queen, told Steve Hackett that he was influenced by the harmony guitar solo at the end of the song.

== Personnel ==
- Peter Gabriel – lead vocals, flute, percussion, oboe
- Tony Banks – Hammond organ, Hohner Pianet electric piano, 12 string guitar, backing vocals
- Steve Hackett – electric guitar, 12 string guitar
- Mike Rutherford – 12 string guitar, Dewtron "Mister Bassman" bass pedal synthesizer
- Phil Collins – drums, backing vocals
