= John Burns (sound engineer) =

British recording engineer

John Burns is a British recording engineer best known for his credits with noted bands of the 1970s including Jethro Tull, Clouds, Genesis, John Martyn and reggae acts Burning Spear, Delroy Washington, Jimmy Cliff and Toots & The Maytals.

== Life and career ==
Burns (who is also a guitarist) played in a teenage band with Andy Johns, the engineer and younger brother of Glyn Johns, and Andy Johns got Burns his first job in the industry, as tea-boy and tape operator at Morgan Studios in 1965, at the time when Morgan were doing all of the recordings for Chris Blackwell's Island Records.

Burns graduated to assistant engineer with the Jethro Tull albums Stand Up (1969) and Benefit (1970); his credits in this period include the self-titled album by Blind Faith (1969), Humble Pie, Jethro Tull, Spooky Tooth, Blodwyn Pig, Ten Years After, Quintessence, David Bowie, King Crimson and Donovan. During 1970 he worked as a live engineer for acts including Jimi Hendrix, The Who and Johnny Winter. He was a live sound engineer at the Isle of Wight Festival in 1969. and toured extensively with Jethro Tull.

He returned to studio work after touring with Tull and Clouds over a period of eighteen months, and engineered Tull's breakthrough Aqualung (1970) album. During a period as freelance engineer with Island Records, when he often stood in for other engineers on sessions, he worked with major acts including Traffic, Mott the Hoople, Fairport Convention, Free, Curved Air, Deep Purple, Marc Bolan and T. Rex, Jeff Beck, Alexis Corner, Jimmy Cliff, Toots & the Maytals and John Martyn, on the sessions that became Martyn's classic Solid Air (1973) album. His first producer credit came when he produced and engineered the now much-heralded Watercolour Days by Clouds in 1971.

In 1972 he began a successful collaboration with progressive rock band Genesis on their Foxtrot album replacing two previous engineers who had been brought in and then quit. Genesis were impressed with his work and he went on to co-produce (with the band) their next three albums -- Selling England by the Pound (1973), which included their first charting single, "I Know What I Like (In Your Wardrobe)", Genesis Live (1973) and their ambitious 2LP concept album The Lamb Lies Down on Broadway (1974), the last Genesis studio album with original lead singer Peter Gabriel.

Later in 1974 he worked at Ginger Baker's studio in Lagos, Nigeria with the late Fela Ransome-Kuti. In 1975 Burns mixed a dub version of Burning Spear's "Garvey's Ghost". During a brief period as owner of Escape Studios in Kent in the late 1970s, he recorded artists including Eric Clapton and Ginger Baker and engineered Motörhead's 1977 self-titled album with producer John "Speedy" Keen (ex Thunderclap Newman). He also produced Straight Eight a band signed to Pete Townshends Eel Pie Label, their first album No Noise from Here. Burns had few major credits after the end of the '70s but has recently begun recording again, working with US singer Lisa Doby and the band JEBO. He is credited as remastering engineer for the reissue of the 1998 Gary Numan album Exile.
