= Nursery Cryme =

Studio album by Genesis
- Released: 12 November 1971
- Recorded: 2 August – 10 September 1971
- Studios: Trident Studios, London
- Genre: Progressive rock
- Length: 39:39
- Label: Charisma
- Producer: John Anthony

Genesis chronology
Trespass (1970)	Nursery Cryme (1971)	Foxtrot (1972)

Nursery Cryme is the third studio album by the English rock band Genesis. Released on 12 November 1971 on Charisma Records, It was their first to feature drummer/vocalist Phil Collins and guitarist Steve Hackett. The album received a mixed response from critics and was not initially a commercial success; it did not enter the UK chart until 1974, when it reached its peak at No. 39. However, the album was successful in continental Europe, particularly Italy.

Following the recruitment of Collins and Hackett, the band extensively toured in support of their previous album Trespass (1970), and then began writing and rehearsing for a follow-up in Luxford House, East Sussex, with recording following at Trident Studios. Nursery Cryme saw the band take a more aggressive direction on some songs, with substantially improved drumming and new guitar techniques, such as tapping and sweep picking. The opening piece, "The Musical Box", uses the band's trademark mix of twelve-string guitars with harsh electric guitars and keyboards. The song, a macabre fairy story set in Victorian Britain, became the inspiration for the album cover, and went on to be a live favourite. Collins brought a new dimension to the group, covering the majority of the backing vocals (including his first lead vocal with Genesis on "For Absent Friends") and bringing in a sense of humour on tracks like "Harold the Barrel". Tony Banks made more prominent use of the Mellotron on several tracks.

The band toured the UK and continental Europe for one year to promote the album, which raised their profile in both territories. The tour included a successful Italian leg in April 1972, where the group played to enthusiastic crowds. Nursery Cryme was certified Silver by the British Phonographic Industry in 2013.

== Background ==
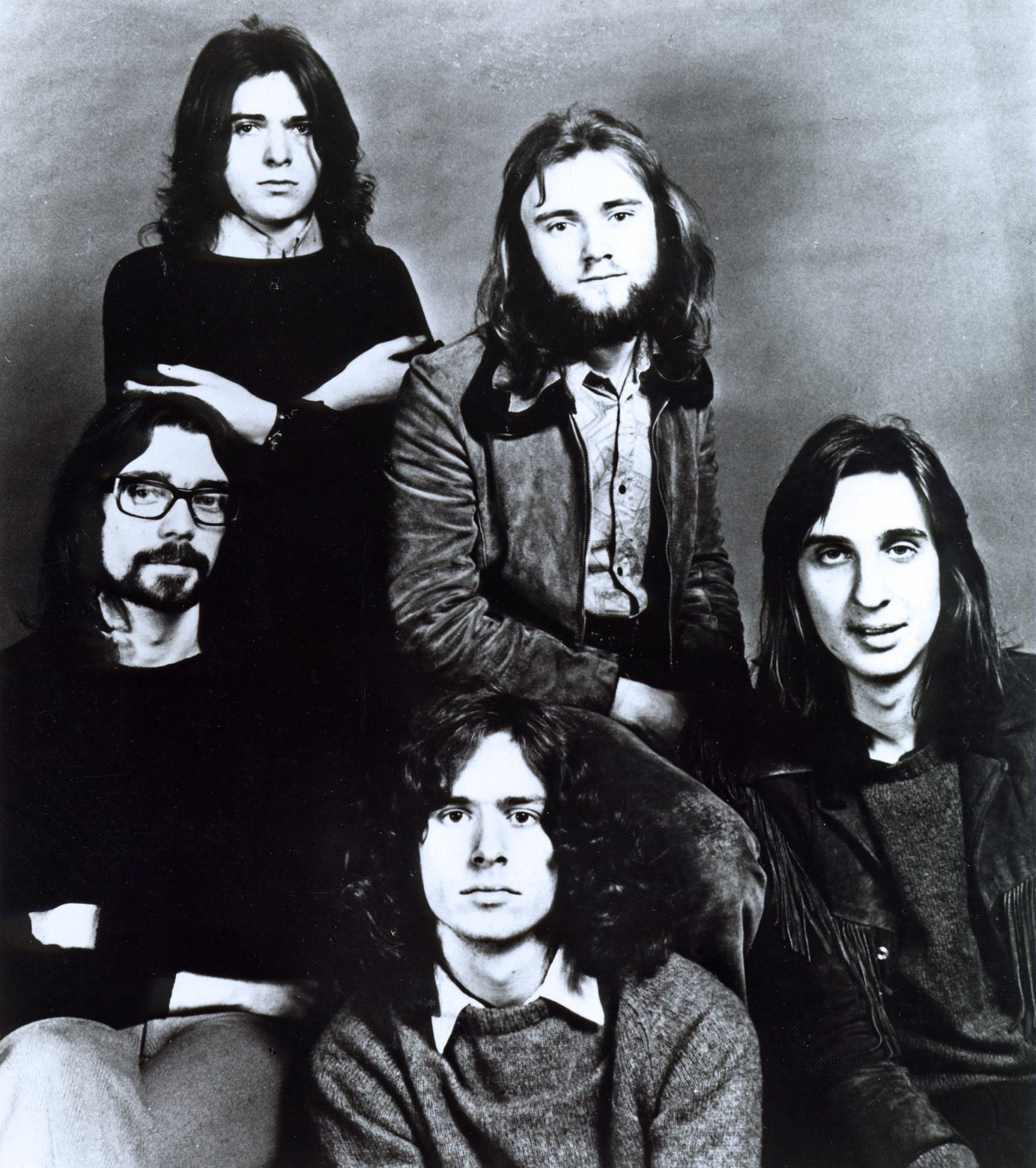
Genesis in a promotional photo for the album. Nursery Cryme was their first with drummer Phil Collins (top middle) and guitarist Steve Hackett (centre left).

Genesis recorded their second album as a professional outfit, Trespass, in July 1970, but shortly afterwards, founding member and guitarist Anthony Phillips quit owing to increased stress and unhappiness in touring. The other founders—singer Peter Gabriel, keyboardist Tony Banks and bassist/guitarist Mike Rutherford—almost split up the group, but decided to carry on and replace drummer John Mayhew with someone who was of equal stature to the others.

Phil Collins joined as the new drummer in August, also becoming an important backing vocalist, but they were unable to find a suitable replacement for Phillips. This led to the group completing the first half of their 1970–1971 tour as a four-piece with Rutherford playing rhythm guitar and bass pedals and Banks playing lead guitar lines on a Pianet through a distorted fuzz box amplifier in addition to his own keyboard parts. Banks credited this with improving his technique, for it required him to play two keyboards simultaneously. The group felt that Collins was the best drummer they had worked with at that point, and his playing style and musical tastes gave a new dimension to their sound. Some songs were not practical to play live as a four-piece, so they looked again for a lead guitarist. In November 1970, Mick Barnard joined the group on recommendation from Friars Aylesbury's David Stopps, and "The Musical Box" was added to the live set. However, the rest of the group realised that Barnard was not up to the same standard as Phillips, and they kept a look-out for a better player.

Genesis recruited Steve Hackett after Gabriel spotted an advert he placed in Melody Maker in December 1970, which read "Imaginative guitarist/writer seeks involvement with receptive musicians, determined to drive beyond existing stagnant music forms." He saw Genesis play a concert at the Lyceum Theatre, London, on 28 December, and was told by Gabriel that Barnard would have to be replaced. Barnard was dismissed from the band on 5 January 1971. Hackett quickly developed a rapport with Rutherford, sharing their love of twelve-string guitars and new musical ideas, and joined the band in early 1971.

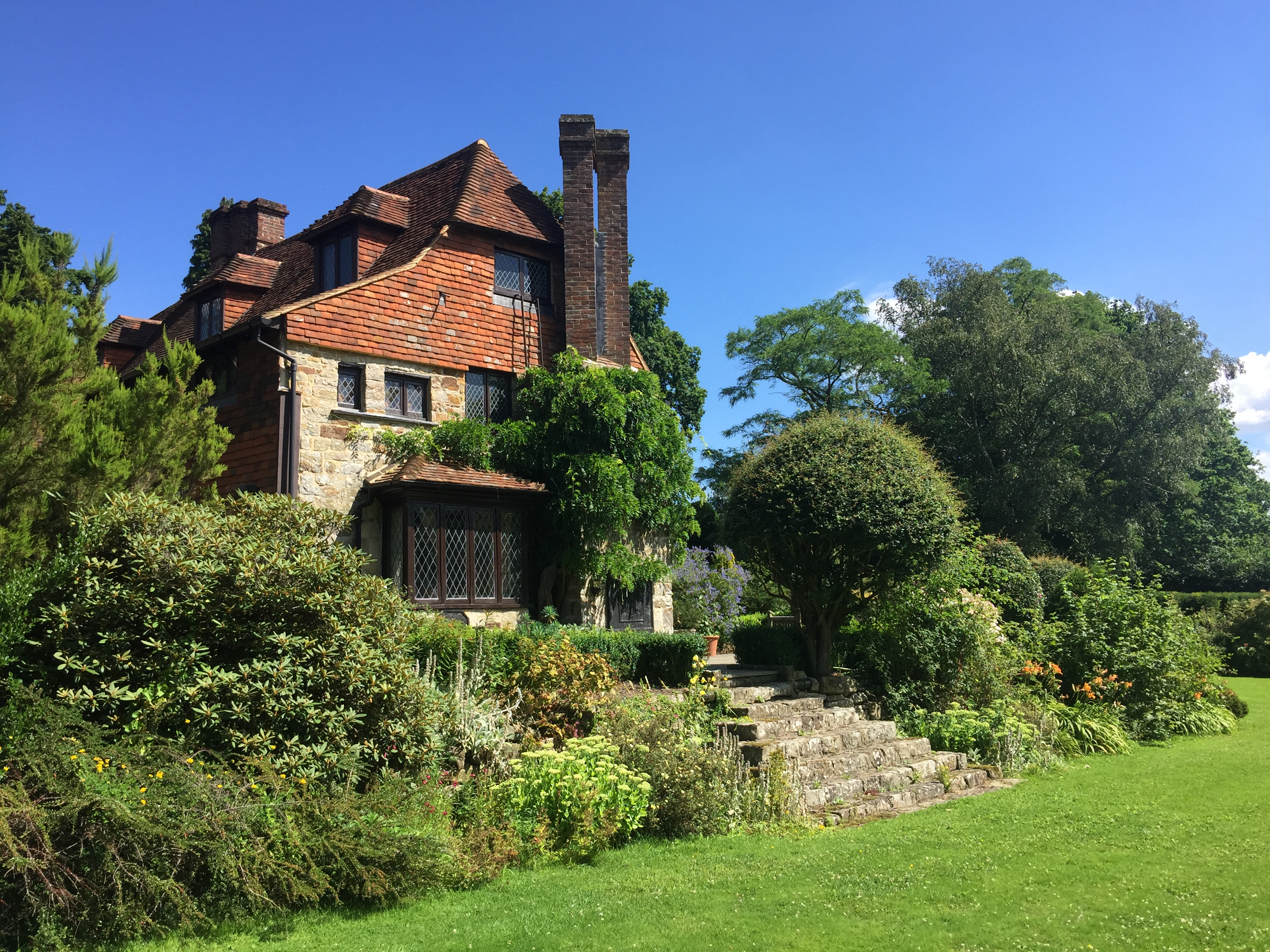
Rehearsals took place at Luxford House

With the addition of Hackett, Genesis continued touring, which included the "Six Bob Tour" with their Charisma Records labelmates Lindisfarne and Van der Graaf Generator, their first overseas shows (which occurred in Belgium), and the first of three appearances at the annual Reading Festival. Early attempts to work on material for their next studio album whilst on tour, in what Hackett described as "the odd day in a windy church hall", were unproductive. This led the group to dedicate time specifically, and in July they began a three-month break from touring to write and record, which was Hackett's first experience of rehearsing with a group to a professional standard. The break was hastened by an injury Peter Gabriel sustained on June 19 during a show at Friar's club in Aylesbury, when he attempted one of the first stage dives into an audience and ended up breaking his ankle.

The five moved to Charisma owner Tony Stratton Smith's residence, Luxford House, a 16th-century Grade II listed building in Crowborough, East Sussex. The group nicknamed the house "Toad Hall". Genesis were apprehensive about writing without Phillips, and both Collins and Hackett were unsure of what level of musical contributions they would be able to make. The group bought a Mellotron; Banks had played a hired one on Trespass and greatly liked the sound. Some material had been written when Phillips was still in the band, and was reworked. Collins, in particular, was a workaholic and was happy to jam with anyone at any time.

== Recording ==
With the new material worked out, Genesis recorded Nursery Cryme at Trident Studios in London in August 1971 with John Anthony as producer and David Hentschel as assistant engineer, both of whom had performed the same roles for Trespass. The album features Hackett playing a Les Paul guitar which the band had bought him along with a Hiwatt stack amplifier. Hackett recalled some difficulty in understanding what Banks and Rutherford were talking about, as the two had devised their own sayings; for instance, a passage that they had played was referred to as a "nice guy".

== Songs ==
=== "The Musical Box" ===
"The Musical Box" was a lengthy piece that described a macabre story set in Victorian Britain. A young boy, Henry, is accidentally decapitated by his friend Cynthia while playing croquet. Returning to the house, Cynthia plays Henry's old musical box, which unleashes the spirit of Henry as an old man. Henry has become sexually frustrated and attempts to seduce Cynthia. The nurse enters the room and hurls the musical box at the wall, destroying both it and Henry.

The song originated when Phillips was in the group, who would often write with Rutherford on 12-string acoustic guitars. The latter had begun to experiment with unorthodox guitar tunings and had the top three strings tuned to F sharp, which provided the jangly sound heard in the opening and the chord that signalled the start of the electric guitar solo. The tuning influenced the title of an acoustic piece, "F♯" (pronounced "F sharp"), that became the basis of "The Musical Box", which was developed further after Phillips's departure. The opening section of the song features both Rutherford and Banks on twelve-string guitar. The high-pitched sound of the opening guitar phrase was created using a varispeed technique; Rutherford's guitar was recorded at half speed, so when played back it sounded higher than it did when it was recorded. An earlier version of the song, entitled "Manipulation", was performed with Phillips in 1970 for the soundtrack of an unreleased BBC documentary on painter Michael Jackson.

The guitar solos originated from Barnard's brief tenure in Genesis. Hackett modified sections that Phillips and Barnard had written while adding his own arrangements to the song. He realised that neither member had made a sound that resembled an actual musical box, so he took the opportunity to record a guitar lick that is heard before the lyric "Here it comes again". Gabriel, a big fan of the Who at the time, pushed for Rutherford to come up with "an arm waving, ballsy attacking" section in a similar style to their guitarist Pete Townshend. Gabriel incorporated themes of violence and sex into the lyrics. Collins was inspired to play a rolling drum part during the middle section from hearing "The Weaver's Answer" by Family, and put it to the rhythm. Banks wrote the chord sequence for the final section of the song. Despite all these additions, Genesis biographer Mario Giammetti reckoned that the original composition written by Rutherford and Phillips in September 1969 amounted to "a good two thirds of this track".

The song became a live favourite during Gabriel's tenure with the band. He first decided on the idea of wearing costumes at a gig in the National Stadium, Dublin, in September 1972, leaving during the instrumental break and re-appearing at the conclusion wearing his wife's red dress and a fox's head. Later he would wear an "old man" mask for the song's ending, acting out the part of the aged Henry.

=== Other songs ===
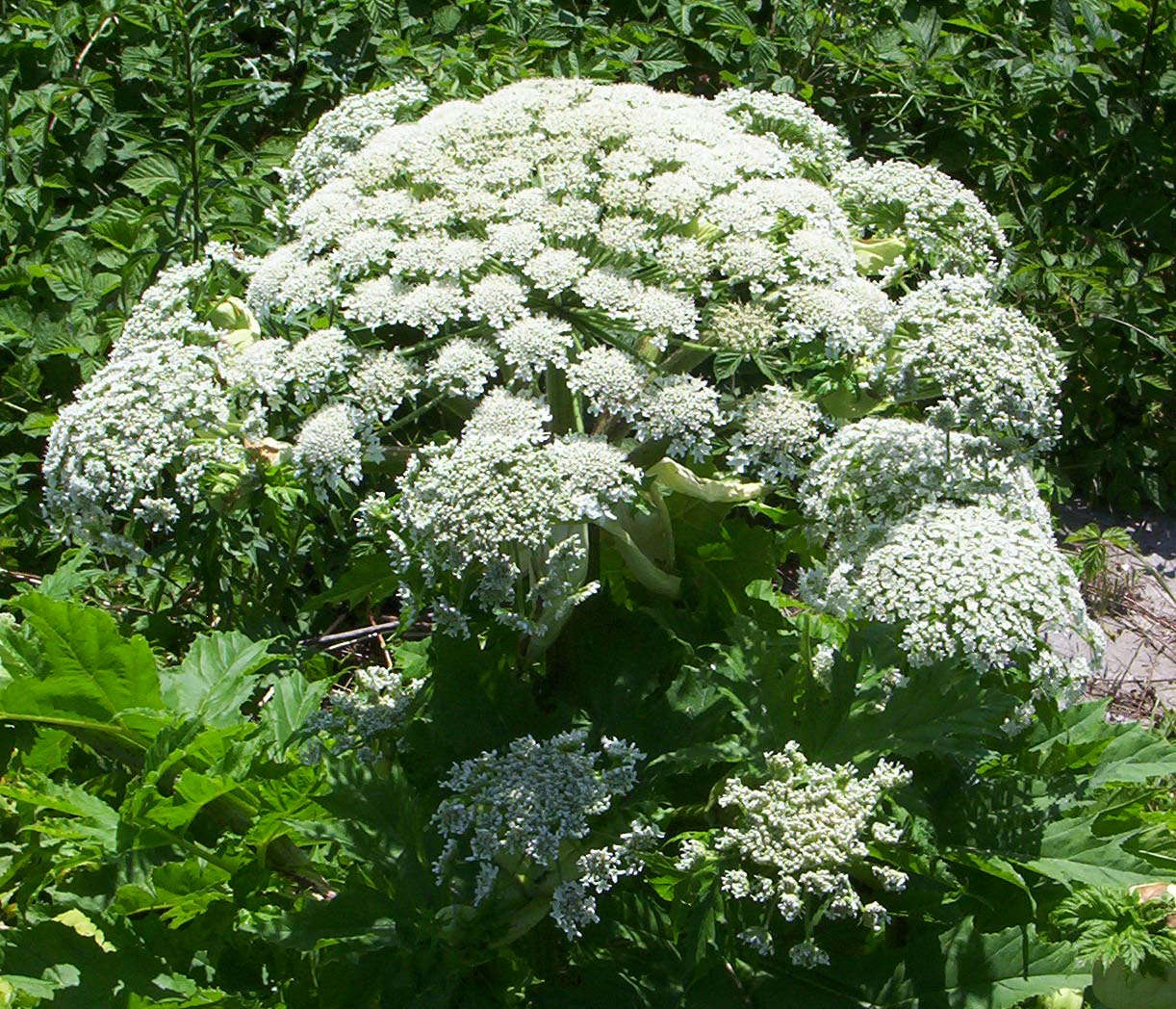
"The Return of the Giant Hogweed" described an outbreak of Heracleum mantegazzianum attacking the human race.

"For Absent Friends" is an acoustic song, and the first Genesis song with Collins on lead vocals. The 12-string acoustic guitars were played by Rutherford and Hackett, and supplemented by a Hohner Pianet played by Banks. After coming up with the music himself and the lyrics with Collins, Hackett recalled being shy when he presented it to Gabriel as they were the new members of the group. Rather than feeling threatened, the original members were pleased that they were contributing to the songwriting, and Gabriel even approved when the other members suggested that Collins sing the lead for the song on the record. Hackett was inspired by "Eleanor Rigby" by the Beatles to write a straightforward song about a relationship, to which Collins suggested one about two old women who had lost their husbands. They wrote most of the lyrics together in the garden of Tony Stratton-Smith's country house.

"The Return of the Giant Hogweed" warns of the spread of the toxic plant Heracleum mantegazzianum (also known as giant hogweed) after it was "captured" in Russia and brought to England by a Victorian explorer. Though the real plant is extremely toxic and dangerous, the song's lyrics are a humorous exaggeration, suggesting the plant is attempting to wipe out the human race. The lyrics were written by Gabriel. The bulk of the song was written during Genesis's time as a four-piece of Banks, Collins, Gabriel, and Rutherford, though Hackett wrote the introduction after joining the band. Both "The Musical Box" and "The Return of the Giant Hogweed" feature Hackett's first use of guitar tapping, a technique whereby the index finger of the plucking hand is applied directly to the guitar fret board. The opening to the latter features Hackett and Banks playing triplets in harmony. (Note: "Tapping" did not attract mainstream attention until Eddie Van Halen demonstrated it in his instrumental "Eruption", seven years after Nursery Cryme.)

"Seven Stones" was conceived by Banks, who used what Rutherford described as "his big, schmaltzy, music hall chords [that] he loved." Hackett wrote the first half of the chorus, the part with wordless vocals. Melody Maker reporter Chris Welch described the song as "strangely mournful and inconclusive". He theorised that the old man addressed in the lyric is expressing his "profound belief that the secret of success and good fortune is based purely on random events and chance".

"Harold the Barrel" showed a humorous side to Genesis, which was encouraged by Collins. The lyrics show black humour of a man contemplating suicide by jumping off a building. The song was written primarily by Gabriel, with Collins assisting him with the lyrics. The track was recorded with Gabriel and Collins singing the song as a duet. Their vocals were mixed onto the same audio track, so they cannot be separated. (Note: Gabriel and Collins would continue to sing together on several Genesis songs during their shared time in the band, performing a "composite voice" according to Hackett. Collins successfully replaced Gabriel as lead singer in 1975 because his voice was already familiar to listeners.)

"Harlequin" was written by Rutherford and Phillips. The instrumentation consists of two 12-string guitars, organ, electric guitar, a Mellotron on the vibraphone setting, and tambourine, and the vocals feature Gabriel, Collins, Rutherford, and Banks all singing harmony. Rutherford played two separate guitar parts on a single 12-string, which he thought produced "pretty dodgy" results, and was also critical of his lyrics. By contrast, listening to the album in 2007, Banks commented that "I used to think 'Harlequin' was a very weak song, but on hearing it again I realise it was pretty good."

"The Fountain of Salmacis" tells the Greek myth of Salmacis and Hermaphroditus. It originated from a short rundown passage that Banks had come up with while at university. An earlier version of the track, entitled "Provocation", was recorded in 1970 for the soundtrack of an unreleased BBC documentary on painter Michael Jackson. The track makes use of the Mellotron, with an influence from King Crimson's In the Court of the Crimson King. Banks thought the instrument greatly complemented his piece when combined with the organ. It became the basis for "The Fountain of Salmacis", which was taken further to a complete song as the result of group jams. Hackett particularly enjoyed the time he came up with his ending guitar solo, which occurred around midnight at Luxford House during a rare moment when the group were up for recording. The lyrics were written by Banks and Gabriel.

== Cover ==
The album's sleeve was designed and illustrated by Paul Whitehead, who also designed the sleeves of Trespass and the band's next album, Foxtrot. The cover depicts characters and scenes based on "The Musical Box" and Coxhill, the manor house with a croquet lawn, itself based on the Victorian home Gabriel grew up in. When the group originally saw Whitehead's painting, they said it did not look old enough, so he varnished it with honey, which made it look like it was from the 19th century. When originally released, the cover shocked some people, because of the severed heads pictured on it.

The inner sleeve resembled an old photo album, with a panel for each song along with an illustrated picture. Whitehead later picked his design for Nursery Cryme as his favourite of the three done for Genesis, noting: "It just works very well with the music. It fits perfect. It's the right colour, the right vibe."

Whitehead's original illustrations for the three albums were stolen from the Charisma archives when the company was sold to Virgin Records in 1983. Whitehead claimed that Charisma staff got wind of the imminent sale and proceeded to loot its office.

A poster of the album cover can be seen in the 1995 film Empire Records, hanging behind the cash register inside the record store.

== Release ==
Nursery Cryme was released on 12 November 1971. Charisma promoted the album less than Trespass since the company was busy with Lindisfarne's Fog on the Tyne. The group felt discouraged by the general indifference from the record company, and believed songs like "The Musical Box" could have been as popular as "Stairway to Heaven", released at the same time.

The album did not chart in the UK until May 1974, when it peaked at No. 39, and charted there again when reissued in 1984, reaching No. 68. Though the group still had a minor cult following at home, they started to achieve commercial and critical success in mainland Europe, with the album reaching No. 4 on the Italian charts. The album continued to sell, and reached Silver certification by the British Phonographic Industry on 22 July 2013 for sales in excess of 60,000 copies.

From November 1971 to August 1972, Genesis toured to support the album, which included further visits to Belgium, and Italy for the first time, where they played to enthusiastic crowds. During the tour, Genesis recorded "Happy the Man", a non-album single, with "Seven Stones" from Nursery Cryme on its B-side. The group played a thirty-minute set on Belgian television to promote the album, which is the earliest surviving full broadcast of the group and has been repeated numerous times. Gabriel had yet to develop his on-stage costume attire and performed the show in a more straightforward frontman role. It has been one of Genesis' most popular bootlegs.

=== Critical reception ===
Retrospective professional reviews
Review scores
Source	Rating
AllMusic	3.5/5 stars
Christgau's Record Guide	C−
Encyclopedia of Popular Music	3/5 stars
The Great Rock Discography	8/10
Music Story	3.5/5 stars
MusicHound Rock	3/5 stars
The Rolling Stone Album Guide	2/5 stars

Contemporary critical response to the album was mixed. Richard Cromelin of Rolling Stone summarised that its "main problem lies not in Genesis' concepts, which are, if nothing else, outrageously imaginative and lovably eccentric, nor with their musical structures—long, involved, multi-movemented frameworks on which they hang their narratives—nor even with their playing, which does get pretty lethargic at points. It's the godawful production, a murky, distant stew that at best bubbles quietly when what is desperately needed are the explosions of drums and guitars, the screaming of the organ, the abrasive rasp of vocal cords." He nonetheless remarked positively on some of the songs, and noted that he saw promise in the band. In a full-page advert published in Melody Maker, keyboardist Keith Emerson wrote a positive summary: "This is not the start for Genesis neither is it the end. No bullshit: Their new album really is incredible". Village Voice critic Robert Christgau was less enthusiastic in a review compiled for Christgau's Record Guide: Rock Albums of the Seventies (1981). Writing in sarcastic exclamations, he said of the record: "God's wounds! It's a 'rock' version of the myth of Hermaphroditus! In quotes cos the organist and the (mime-influenced) vocalist have the drummer a little confused! Or maybe it's just the invocation to Old King Cole!"

Retrospective appraisals have been mildly positive. BBC Music praised the two new members of the band as fundamental to Genesis's artistic success, remarking "Collins' snappy drums were augmented by his uncanny ability to sound not unlike Gabriel ... Hackett's armoury of tapping and swell techniques really broadened the palette of the band, giving Tony Banks more room for his Delius-lite organ filigrees, not to mention their newly purchased Mellotron", and thought that "Genesis had virtually invented their own genre, Edwardian rock". Although Stephen Thomas Erlewine of AllMusic deemed the album highly uneven, he considered "The Musical Box" and "The Return of the Giant Hogweed" to be "genuine masterpieces", and concluded that even if the rest of the album "isn't quite as compelling or quite as structured, it doesn't quite matter because these are the songs that showed what Genesis could do, and they still stand as pinnacles of what the band could achieve". Geddy Lee of Rush included this album among his favourites in a list from an interview with The Quietus.

== Track listing ==
All tracks written by Tony Banks, Phil Collins, Peter Gabriel, Steve Hackett, Mike Rutherford

Side one
No.	Title	Length
1.	"The Musical Box"	10:32
2.	"For Absent Friends"	1:48
3.	"The Return of the Giant Hogweed"	8:13
Total length:		20:33

Side two
No.	Title	Length
1.	"Seven Stones"	5:12
2.	"Harold the Barrel"	3:01
3.	"Harlequin"	2:57
4.	"The Fountain of Salmacis"	7:56
Total length:		19:06

== Personnel ==
Credits are adapted from the album's 1971 and 2007 liner notes.

Genesis

- Tony Banks – Hammond organ, Mellotron, acoustic piano, electric piano, 12-string guitar, backing vocals
- Mike Rutherford – bass, bass pedals, 12-string guitar, backing vocals
- Peter Gabriel – lead vocals, flute, oboe, bass drum, tambourine
- Steve Hackett – electric guitar, 12-string guitar
- Phil Collins – drums, percussion, backing vocals, lead vocal on "For Absent Friends" (uncredited)

Production

- John Anthony – production
- David Hentschel – engineer
- Mike Stone – tape jockey
- Paul Whitehead – sleeve design

== Charts ==
Chart (1972–1974)	Peak position
Italian Albums (Musica e dischi)	11
UK Albums (Official Charts)	39

Chart (2014)	Peak position
UK Rock & Metal Albums (Official Charts)	24

Chart (2024)	Peak position
Hungarian Physical Albums (MAHASZ)	13

== Certifications ==
Region	Certification	Certified units/sales
France (SNEP)	Gold	100,000^{*}
United Kingdom (BPI) 2009 release	Silver	60,000^{^}
^{*} Sales figures based on certification alone.^{^} Shipments figures based on certification alone.
