= Bass pedals =

Foot-operated musical instrument

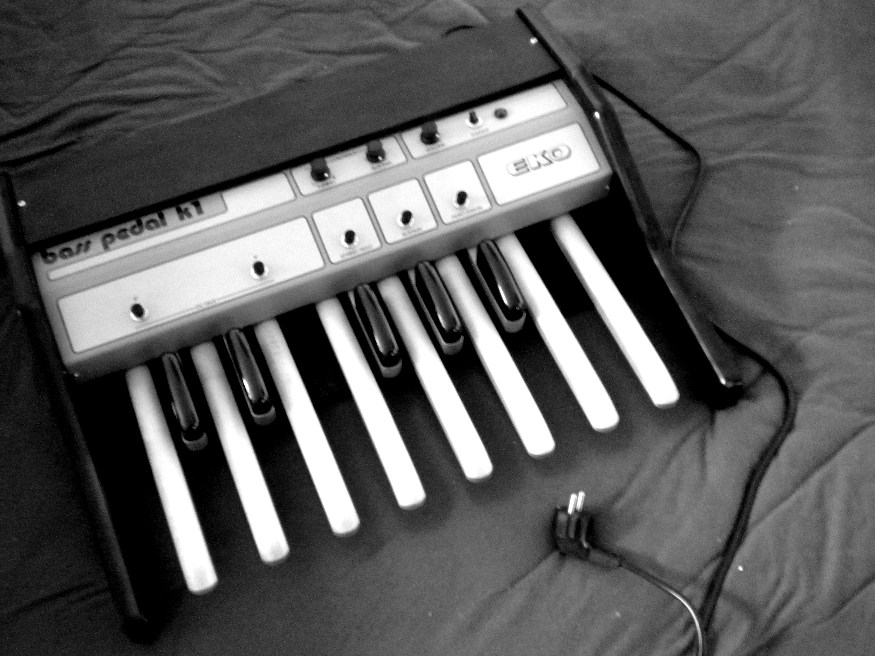
An EKO K1 bass pedalboard from the 1970s.

Bass pedals are an electronic musical instrument with a foot-operated pedal keyboard with a range of one or more octaves. The earliest bass pedals from the 1970s consisted of a pedalboard and analog synthesizer tone generation circuitry packaged together as a unit. The bass pedals are plugged into a bass amplifier or PA system so that their sound can be heard. Since the 1990s, bass pedals are usually MIDI controllers, which have to be connected to a MIDI-compatible computer, electronic synthesizer keyboard, or synth module to produce musical tones. Some 2010s-era bass pedals have both an onboard synth module and a MIDI output.

Bass pedals serve the same function as the pedalboard on a pipe organ or an electric organ, and usually produce sounds in the bass range, which, in organ terminology is the 16′ stop. Some bass pedals have an 8′ stop (an octave higher) which can be used by itself or combined with the 16' stop. Bass pedals are used by keyboard players as an adjunct to their full-range manual keyboards (the keyboards played with the hands), by performers of other instruments (e.g., electric bass or electric guitar), or by themselves. Bass pedal units usually have a smaller range (13 notes) than a church pipe organ's pedal keyboard (32 notes for an American Guild of Organists standard pedalboard). Bass pedals with larger ranges are less common, but do exist, such as 17 notes (C to E), 20 notes (C to G), and 25 notes (C to C two octaves higher). As well, bass pedals usually have shorter pedals than those on a church pipe organ's pedalboard.

== Elements ==
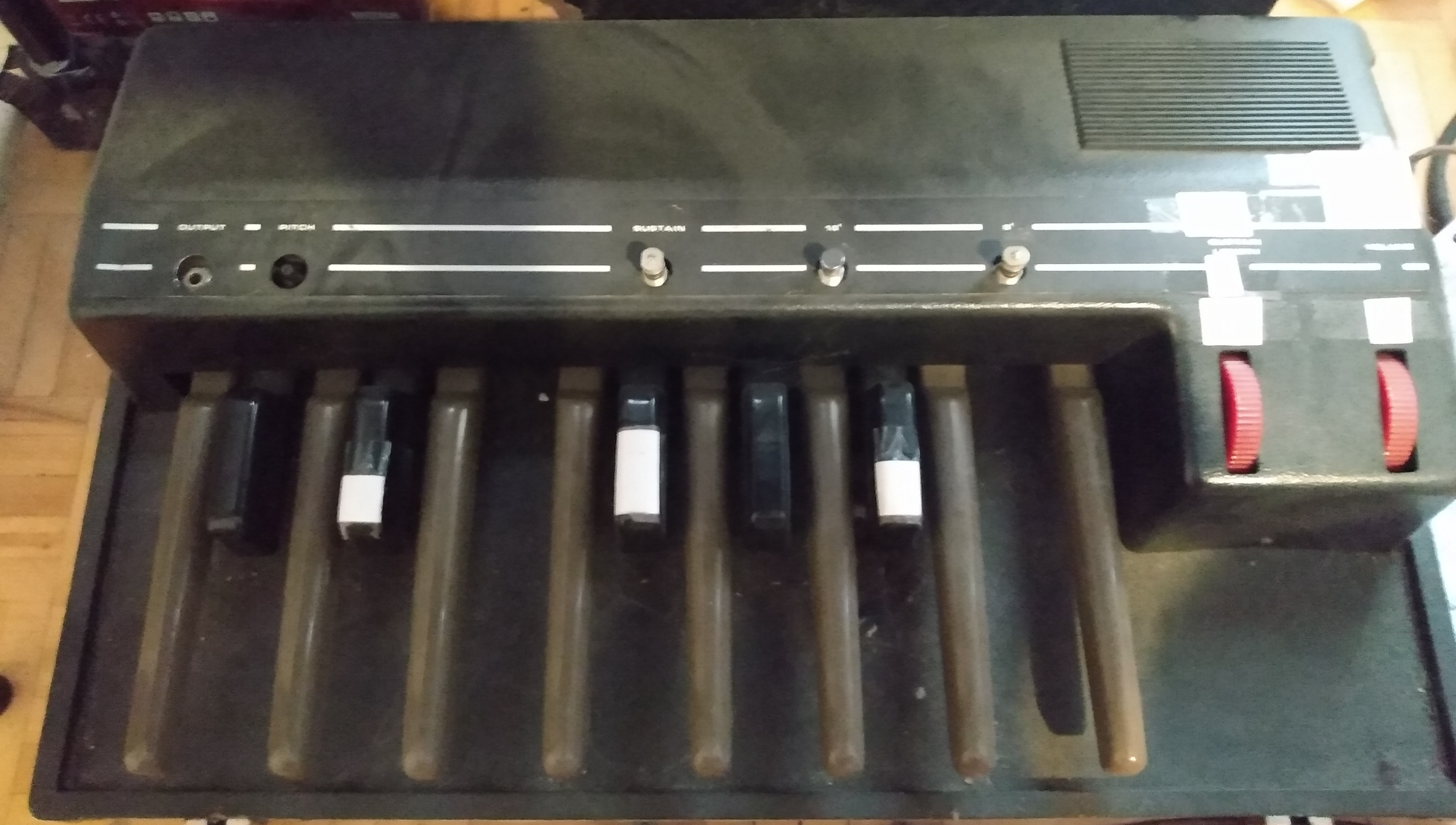
A 1970s Crumar bass pedalboard for organ. This is a standalone unit with an internal bass synthesizer. The foot-controlled buttons are for sustain (applied to every note), 16' (sub-bass), and 8' (bass) stops.

All bass pedal units consist of foot-operated pedals mounted in a chassis that sits on the floor. The chassis has buttons on top, also designed to be operated with the feet, which enable the performer to change the sound. Typical buttons include a 16' and 8' button to give a contrabass or bass sound. Some models may have a sustain button; despite the name, it is used differently from an electronic piano's sustain pedal. Whereas an electronic piano's sustain pedal is a momentary, non-latching switch depressed to provide sustain, and then released to end the sustained note, a bass pedal unit's electronic sustain is a latching switch, which, when clicked on automatically sustains all notes for a fixed, short period after the pedal is released. The benefit of the bass pedal's sustain button is that it facilitates legato, sostenuto basslines in slow ballads. Some units with sustain also had a rolling dial to enable the setting of the automatic sustain length.

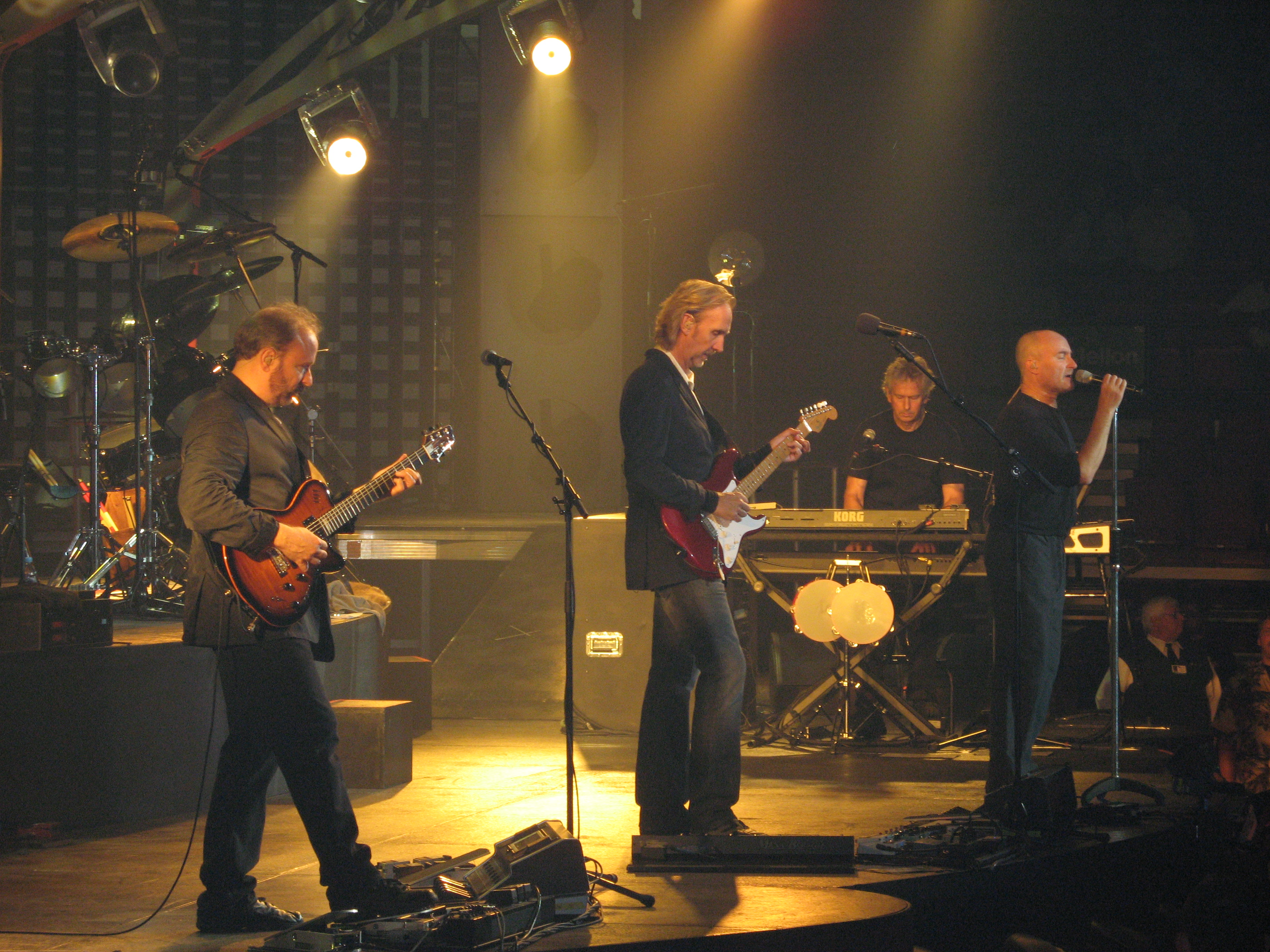
Genesis in concert in 2007: Daryl Stuermer (left) plays a Moog Taurus.

A 1970s-era bass pedal is typically monophonic, which meant that it could only play one note at a time. Even if the player presses two pedals simultaneously, such as a C and a G, only one note sounds. Given that bass pedals are typically used to play deep-pitched basslines, some models had a "low note priority" circuit. With this circuit, if the player pressed two or more pedals, the unit would only sound the lowest pitched note. A 1970s unit might have a choice of several imitated instruments, such as organ bass, string bass (with more decay), or tuba. Some units had a rolling dial, once again foot-operated, to control the volume. A 1970s unit might have a single output: a 1/4 jack. A unit from this era might have only one visual indicator: a power on LED. Since the bass pedals are on the ground, there is a risk that the player might accidentally press on one of the buttons and change the sound. To reduce this risk, some bass pedals have plastic covers over some of the buttons or U-shaped "switch guard" protectors near some buttons.

Some 1990s and later bass pedals gave the player the option of selecting a monophonic or polyphonic setting. The polyphonic setting could sound more than one pitch at a time. Even though contrabass instruments are less likely to be used to play chords (three or more notes sounded together) than their higher-pitched cousins (as deep-pitched chords can sound unclear and "muddy"), a contrabass instrument like a bass pedal unit can still effectively play some dyads (two-notes sounded together), such as perfect fifths, perfect fourths, and octaves. On a bass pedal unit with a wider range, such as a 20-note unit, a minor tenth or major tenth might sound pleasing, especially at an 8' register.

A 1990s or later unit might have a 1/4 jack output and one or more 5-pin MIDI jacks (e.g., MIDI out or thru). Some 1990s or later units have alphanumeric LED displays and/or small LEDs to provide information to the player about the settings.

=== Organ bass pedals ===
A few of the bass pedals designed to be used with electronic or clonewheel organs have features that operate the upper manual keyboards, such as an expression pedal or swell pedal, which is a treadle-style potentiometer for controlling the volume; buttons to turn on or change the speed of a Leslie speaker, a rotating horn speaker in a cabinet; or program change buttons, which send a MIDI message to the other upper keyboards to change to a new sound or setting.

Some bass pedals designed to be used with electronic organs have a MIDI merge feature, so that one or more keyboards can have their MIDI outs plugged into the bass pedal, and then the bass pedal merges the MIDI messages and sends them, via the bass pedal's MIDI out, to the organ sound module. This function might be needed if a keyboardist had two MIDI controller keyboards, and the bass pedals, and wants the MIDI messages from all three controllers to be sent to the sound module.

== History ==
=== Origins ===
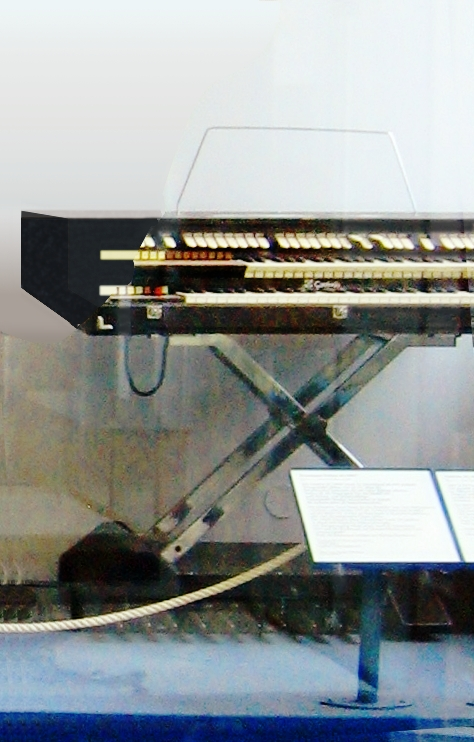
This Sisme combo organ shows the more portable type of combo organs made in the 1970s. This organ has bass pedals in a separate chassis. Eventually, these types of bass pedals were designed and sold as standalone units.

Pedalboards have been a standard feature on pipe organs for centuries, and since the 1930s, electromechanical organs such as the Hammond organ often included pedalboards. In the 1960s, home spinet organs by Hammond, Farfisa, and other manufacturers included short, 13-note bass pedals attached to the base of the chassis. In the 1970s, electronic organ makers were aware that musicians wanted organs that could be taken to gigs at bars and festivals, so organs were made more portable. To make organs more portable, they were changed from being housed in heavy wooden consoles with an integrated amplifier and speaker and bass pedals (the home organ approach) to being made as a main keyboard, a detachable stand, and detachable bass pedals. The organist was expected to plug the organ into a Leslie speaker or other instrument amplifier and speaker. Even if the total weight of a split-apart organ was the same, portability was improved, because the individual components were lighter than an entire home console organ.

Once organ companies were making portable organs, some manufacturers began building bass pedals that could function separately from the organ console. These afforded the player great portability, and flexibility in combining them with other instruments and electronic equipment. A 1970s-era musician with a standalone bass pedal could use it under an organ for one set, put it under an electric piano for a second set, then pull it out and use it while playing guitar for a third set.

=== 1970s and 1980s ===
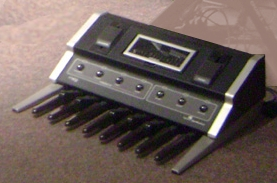
Moog Taurus (1976-1981)

An early and popular bass pedal device was the Moog Taurus. Moog called this instrument a "Pedal Synthesizer" in their literature, and explicitly pointed out that its five-octave range made it "more than a bass instrument". . Despite these efforts, most players used them for basslines, and the term bass pedals stuck. The Taurus I and II models are no longer in production, but they are prized as vintage instruments. In 2010, Moog introduced a new model, the Taurus III, in a limited run of 1000 units.

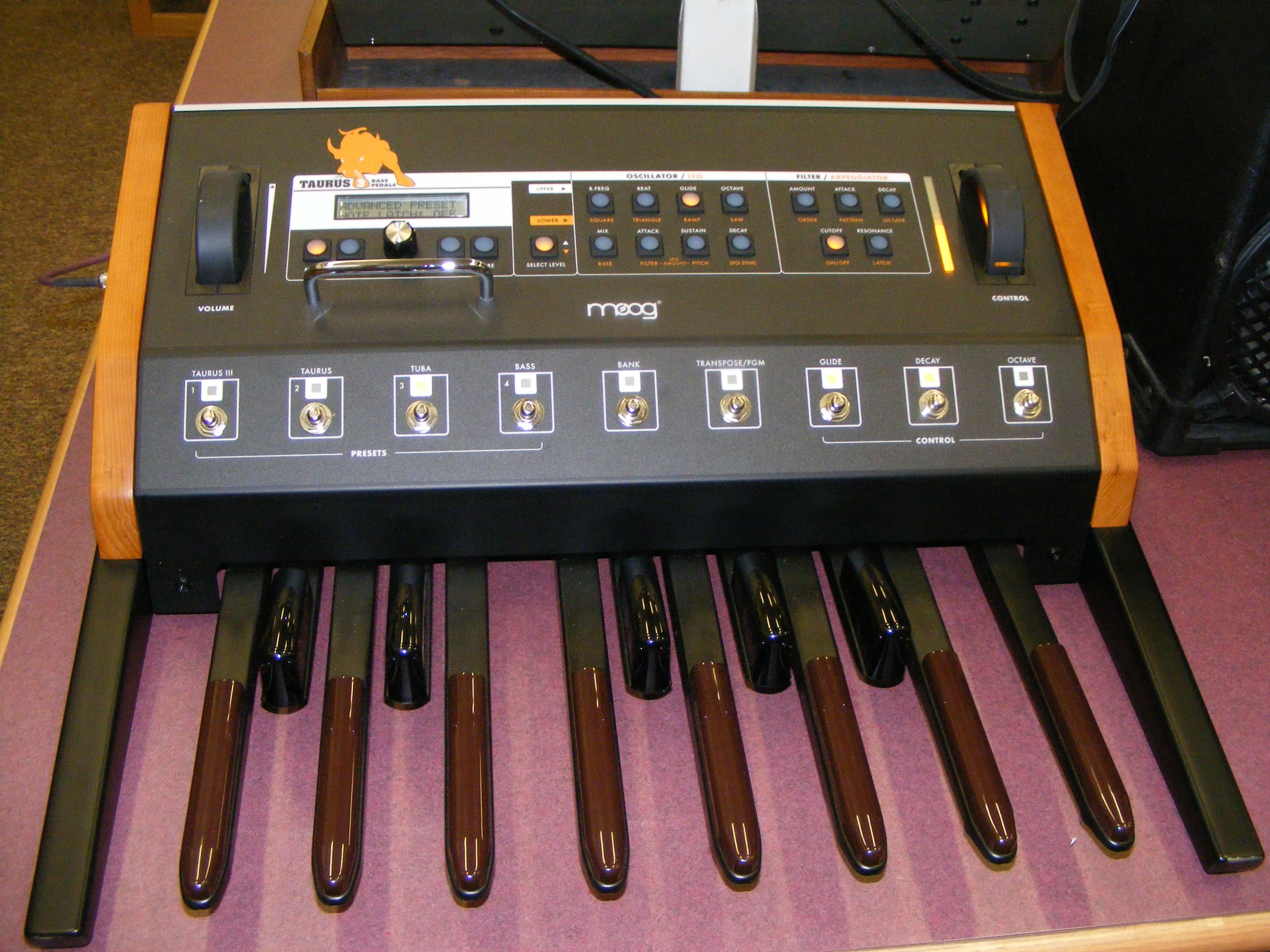
The Taurus III (2010-2012) offered more features, including fuzz bass.

Several progressive rock and hard rock groups (such as Yes, Genesis, Van der Graaf Generator, Led Zeppelin and Rush) and alternative rock groups such as U2 and The Police used bass pedals. Often, the group's bass guitarist would play in a standing position, meaning that they could only use one foot at a time to play, rather than play sitting down with both feet, as organists traditionally had. However, John Paul Jones of Led Zeppelin used bass pedals while sitting down at a keyboard. Bass guitarists frequently used Taurus pedals to hold down sustained, low-pitched pedal points while performing high-register melodic lines or percussive parts on the bass guitar. In 1983, Phil Collins' song "I Don't Care Anymore" used the Taurus for its bass parts. A Taurus also appears in the song's music video, with Mo Foster using his hands, rather than his feet, to play it.

=== 1990s and 2000s ===
==== Jazz, rock, and popular music ====
Since the 1990s, most electronic pedalboards have been MIDI controllers, which do not perform any tone generation themselves. These pedalboards have to be connected to a MIDI-compatible computer, electronic keyboard or rack-mounted synthesizer to produce musical tones. Despite the fact that these pedalboards can control any kind of MIDI device, and can therefore produce a virtually unlimited range of musical pitches (and other sounds), ranging from a high-pitched melody to percussion sounds, they are still often referred to as "bass pedals".

Current manufacturers of these products, such as Hammond, Roland, Studiologic (formerly known as Fatar), and R. W. Designs, mostly sell keyboards with 13-note keyboards (C to C, one octave), 17-note (C to E, an octave and a third) keyboards, or 25-note keyboards (C to C, two octaves). Pedalboards with less than a 32-note range are often used by jazz, rock, or popular music performers.

==== Baroque and church music ====
To perform Baroque church music repertoire (e.g., J.S. Bach), a 30-note keyboard (C to F, two octaves and a fourth) is needed. A smaller number of manufacturers, such as Classic Organworks, sell a MIDI controller in full-sized 32-note AGO layout that can be used to perform virtually all organ repertoire.

In the art music and church music context, MIDI pedalboards and digitally sampled or synthesized pipe organ instruments are used either as practice instruments or as performance instruments. Some universities and churches use MIDI pedalboards and digital organs as practice instruments, to allow a larger number of students to practice. Some churches use MIDI pedalboards to trigger digitally sampled sounds for the low register of the pipe organ. This has led to some controversy, because this mixes digitally sampled, electronically amplified sounds with the wind-driven pipe sound of the rest of the pipe organ; some purists argue that this is inappropriate, or that the sound or tonal quality of the digital bass voices are unsuitable.

== Other uses ==
While bass pedals are usually used to perform basslines, MIDI-equipped pedals can be used for a range of other purposes. The different pedals can be assigned to perform different chords, which allows a one man band-style performer to perform chords with a single foot-press. Additionally, MIDI pedals can be used with a keyboard workstation or an arranger keyboard to trigger different parts of sequenced song arrangements. For example, a performer could use the pedals to trigger the chorus, verse, and solo sections of a sequenced song. Another musical use of MIDI pedals would be to have each pedal linked to a different drum sound, such as a bass drum, snare, and cymbals; this would permit the performance of rudimentary drum kit parts.

A MIDI-equipped pedalboard can also be used for non-musical purposes:

- theatre lighting
- stage lighting in a rock club
- special effects
- sound design
- VJ-ing
- recording system synchronization
- audio processor control
- computer networking, as demonstrated by the early first-person shooter game MIDI Maze, 1987
- animatronic figure control
- animation parameter control, as demonstrated by Apple Motion v2

Such non-musical applications of the MIDI 1.0 protocol (sometimes over MIDI-DIN, sometimes using other transports) are possible because of its general-purpose nature. Any device built with a standard MIDI Out connector should in theory be able to control any other device with a MIDI In port, just as long as the developers of both devices have the same understanding about the semantic meaning of all the MIDI messages the sending device emits. This agreement can come either because both follow the official MIDI standard specifications, or else in the case of any non-standard functionality, because the message meanings are directly agreed upon by the two manufacturers.

== See also ==
- Pedal keyboard
- Keyboard bass
