= List of Genesis concert tours =

This is a list of concert tours by the rock band Genesis.

== Overview ==
List of Genesis tours, showing name, date span, dates and gross
Name	Span	Dates	Box Office Gross
Pre - Tour	9/23/1969-9/19/1970	87	
Trespass	10/2/1970-5/10/1971	96	
Nursery Cryme	6/19/1971-9/12/1972	212	
Foxtrot	9/13/1972-8/26/1973	121	
Selling England by the Pound	9/19/1973-5/6/1974	112	
The Lamb Lies Down on Broadway	11/20/1974-5/22/1975	104	
A Trick of the Tail	3/26/1976-7/11/1976	63	$55,000
Wind & Wuthering	1/1/1977-7/3/1977	97	$326,194
...And Then There Were Three...	3/28/1978-12/3/1978	87	
Duke	3/17/1980-6/30/1980	76	
Abacab	9/25/1981-12/23/1981	66	
Three Sides Live	8/1/1982-9/30/1982	45	
Six of the Best	10 February 1982	1	£4,000,000
The Mama Tour	11/7/1983-2/29/1984	70	
Invisible Touch World Tour	9/18/1986-7/4/1987	113	$170,400,000*
We Can't Dance Tour	5/8/1992-11/17/1992	71	$20,380,548
Calling All Stations Tour	1/23/1998-5/31/1998	49	
Turn It On Again: The Tour	6/11/2007-10/13/2007	48	$122,554,926
The Last Domino? Tour	9/20/2021-3/26/2022	47	$100,288,913

Invisible Touch Tour statistics for gross are based on North American tour averages.

== Places played ==
List of Genesis tours, showing places played
Name	Continents	Countries
Pre - Tour	Europe	United Kingdom (78)
Trespass	Europe	United Kingdom (95), Belgium (1)
Nursery Cryme	Europe	United Kingdom (171), Italy (26), Belgium (8), France (4), Netherlands (2), Germany (1)
Foxtrot	Europe, North America	United Kingdom (84), United States (17), Germany (6), France (5), Canada (3), Italy (3), Belgium (1), Switzerland (1), Ireland (1)
Selling England by the Pound	North America, Europe	United States (61), United Kingdom (23), Canada (12), Germany (7), France (4), Italy (4), Switzerland (3), Belgium (2)
The Lamb Lies Down on Broadway	North America, Europe	United States (38), Germany (18), United Kingdom (16), France (12), Spain (4), Netherlands (3), Belgium (2), Canada (2), Portugal (2), Switzerland (1), Denmark (1), Italy (1), Norway (1)
A Trick of the Tail	North America, Europe	United States (26), United Kingdom (9), Canada (8), Germany (7), France (3), Belgium (2), Switzerland (2), Netherlands (1), Sweden (1)
Wind & Wuthering	North America, Europe, South America	United States (35), United Kingdom (25), Brazil (14), Canada (7), Germany (6), France (5), Belgium (2), Sweden (2), Switzerland (1), Netherlands (1)
...And Then There Were Three...	North America, Europe, Asia	United States (43), Germany (13), France (10), Japan (6), Netherlands (4), Canada (3), Belgium (2), Sweden (2), Austria (1), Switzerland (1), United Kingdom (1), Norway (1)
Duke	Europe, North America	United Kingdom (42), United States (25), Canada (7)
Abacab	North America, Europe	United States (21), Germany (17), France (8), United Kingdom (7), Canada (5), Switzerland (2), Spain (2), Netherlands (2), Belgium (1), Italy (1)
Three Sides Live	North America, Europe	United States (21), United Kingdom (12), Italy (3), Canada (2), Sweden (2), Belgium (1), Switzerland (1), Germany (1), Denmark (1), France (1)
Six of the Best	Europe	United Kingdom (1)
The Mama Tour	North America, Europe	United States (57), Canada (8), United Kingdom (5)
Invisible Touch World Tour	North America, Europe, Oceania, Asia	United States (61), Australia (19), United Kingdom (6), Japan (6), Germany (5), France (5), Switzerland (2), Spain (2), Italy (2), Austria (1), Canada (1), Denmark (1), Hungary (1), Netherlands (1), New Zealand (1)
We Can't Dance Tour	North America, Europe	United States (27), United Kingdom (20), Germany (11), France (5), Canada (4), Austria (1), Belgium (1), Switzerland (1), Italy (1), Netherlands (1), Portugal (1), Sweden (1)
Calling All Stations Tour	Europe	France (13), Germany (11), United Kingdom (9), Italy (3), Spain (2), Hungary (2), Austria (1), Belgium (1), Switzerland (1), Czechia (1), Denmark (1), Finland (1), Ireland (1), Netherlands (1), Norway (1), Poland (1), Sweden (1)
Turn It On Again: The Tour	North America, Europe	United States (22), Germany (9), Canada (3), United Kingdom (3), France (2), Austria (1), Belgium (1), Switzerland (1), Czechia (1), Denmark (1), Finland (1), Italy (1), Netherlands (1), Poland (1)
The Last Domino? Tour	North America, Europe	United States (17), United Kingdom (15), Germany (7), Canada (4), France (2), Netherlands (2)

Miscellaneous Information
Most Played Song	Drum Duet / Los Endos (663)
Most Songs Played Off Album	The Lamb Lies Down on Broadway (4056)
Longest Tour	Nursery Cryme (212)
Longest Touring Year	1972 (228)
Most Covered Song	Solsbury Hill by Peter Gabriel (4)
Most Guest Appearances	The Phenix Horns (8)
Most Played Country	United Kingdom (649)
Most Played Venue	The Spectrum

Most Played Songs
Drum Duet / Los Endos	663
I Know What I Like (In Your Wardrobe)	641
Afterglow	606
In the Cage	604
Turn It On Again	594
Firth of Fifth	571
The Lamb Lies Down on Broadway	549
Carpet Crawlers	514
Dance on a Volcano	496
Follow You Follow Me	490
