= The Musical Box (band) =

Canadian Genesis tribute band

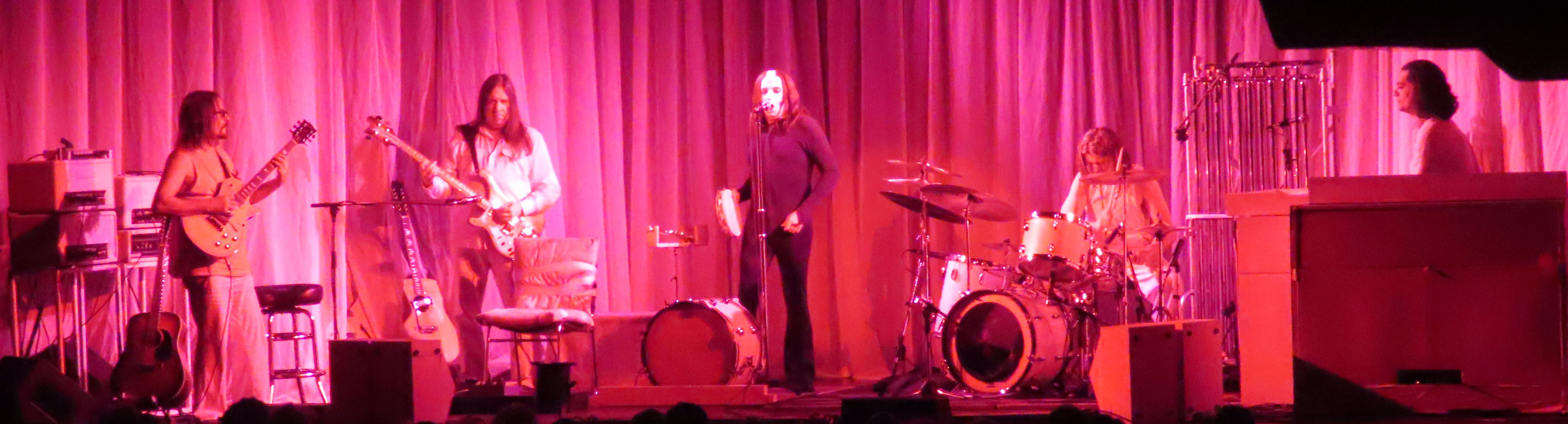
- The Musical Box performing in 2025

Background information
- Origin: Montreal, Quebec, Canada
- Genres: Progressive rock
- Years active: 1993–present
- Members: Denis Gagné; François Gagnon; Sébastien Lamothe; Ian Benhamou; Marc Laflamme
- Past members: Michel Cloutier; François Richard; Guillaume Courteau; Denis Champoux; Éric Savard; Christian Hebert; Martin Levac; Pierre Veilleux; Marc Léveillé; André Lépine; David Myers; Gregg Bendian; Marc Laflamme; Guillaume Rivard; Antoine Baril; Bob St-Laurent
- Website: www.themusicalbox.net

The Musical Box are a Canadian tribute band formed in Montreal, Quebec in 1993 who recreate performances by the English rock band Genesis during the 1970s. The current line-up is formed of singer and performer Denis Gagné (Peter Gabriel), guitarist François Gagnon (Steve Hackett), bassist Sébastien Lamothe (Mike Rutherford), keyboardist Ian Benhamou (Tony Banks), and drummer Marc Laflamme (Phil Collins).

== History ==
The Musical Box were formed in 1993 in Montreal, Quebec in Canada, and take their name from the song of the same name from Genesis's third studio album, Nursery Cryme (1971), the first album featuring the classic lineup which musical box now portray. Founding member and musical director, bassist Sébastien Lamothe, advertised in local newspapers for musicians who were Genesis fans to play in the band. The group initially performed as a seven-piece band and incorporated visual effects and costumes that were a part of Genesis's original shows. From 1993 to 2000, The Musical Box focused on Genesis concerts during their Nursery Cryme, Foxtrot (1972), and Selling England by the Pound (1973) tours, before Gabriel and then Hackett later left Genesis.

In 1994, following the departure of lead singer and performer Marc Léveillé, the band recruited Denis Gagné as his replacement through a newspaper advert. He recalled listening to Genesis albums when he was at school and becoming a fan of Gabriel. He attempted to put on a concert featuring himself and his friends playing along to the music, but it never happened. The band reformed as a five-piece, mirroring the member count that Genesis had at the time. The new line-up marked the beginning of the band concentrating on staging Genesis shows more accurately, including lights, costume, and recreating Gabriel's on stage persona and dialogue. Gagné immersed himself in the role of Gabriel, learning to play the flute, growing his hair long, and shaving a bald spot in the front of his hairline. Since 2001, The Musical Box has grown in popularity, and has performed large sold-out shows in Canada, the United States, Europe and South America.

In 2004, the band secured the license to re-create Genesis's 1974–1975 tour that featured their double album The Lamb Lies Down on Broadway (1974) performed in its entirety, with encores. The tour was registered as a play. This time round, the band wished to recreate the two-hour show as closely as possible. They observed silent footage of the band performing, gathered magazine articles and audience member accounts of the shows, and Banks granted them access to The Farm, the band's recording studio in Surrey, to hear the original 24-track master tape of the album so they could isolate each track and take apart passages in the music they deemed too difficult to recreate. The stage show included use of the 1,200 projection slides used on the original tour, including the original slide operator.

In 2007, The Musical Box toured North America and Europe with a mix of Foxtrot and Selling England by the Pound shows. Some dates featured the "Black Show", a recreation of the 1974 leg of Genesis's Selling England by the Pound tour that features an alternate set list and arrangements.

In early 2007, plans for The Musical Box to stage a recreation of Genesis's 1976 tour in support of A Trick of the Tail (1976) were in the tentative stages. This marked the first time the band performed Genesis material not from the Gabriel-led era. The tour began in September 2008, and featured Gregg Bendian as their second drummer in the part of Bill Bruford. As the 1976 tour marked the debut of Collins on lead vocals, the role of Collins was played on stage by Gagné on vocals and Marc Laflamme on the drums and second vocals.

The Musical Box took a break in 2010. In 2011 and 2012 the band toured The Lamb Lies Down on Broadway, this time with keyboardist Michel Cloutier.

In 2013 and 2014, the band toured Selling England by the Pound in celebration of the album's fortieth anniversary, with some dates replaced with their Foxtrot show. The tour was then extended and performed until early 2018, with some dates featuring the "Black Show".

From late 2018 to early 2019, the band toured a new production titled, A Genesis Extravaganza, in celebration of the band's twenty-fifth anniversary. The show was a three act performance, featuring music spanning from From Genesis to Revelation (1969) to Wind & Wuthering (1976).

In late 2019 and early 2020, they toured a sequel to the acclaimed A Genesis Extravaganza, titled, Extravaganza Volume 2. The setlist of the production spanned from Trespass (1970) up to ...And Then There Were Three... (1978), marking a venture into the trio era for the first time in the band's history.

== Reception ==
=== Critics ===
In The Buffalo News, Jeff Miers wrote: "The Musical Box elevates the concept of the 'tribute' band to a new level".

=== Genesis ===
The Musical Box is the only Genesis tribute band that has received active support and permission from the real group. In 2002, Hackett joined them on stage at the Royal Albert Hall in London, playing an encore of "Firth of Fifth". He played with them on stage once more in Switzerland. Collins wrote a positive introduction of the band for one of their tour programs, and was an audience member at their show in Geneva, Switzerland in 2005 during The Lamb Lies Down on Broadway tour, which featured him on the drums for an encore performance of "The Musical Box". Gabriel attended the band's first show in the UK, and brought his children so "they could see what their father used to do".

== Setlists ==
The Musical Box's setlists are identical to those played by Genesis during their early tours.

- The Foxtrot shows included songs from the albums Nursery Cryme and Foxtrot: "Watcher of the Skies", "Can-Utility and the Coast-Liners", "The Musical Box", "Get 'em Out by Friday", "Supper's Ready" and "The Return Of The Giant Hogweed", as well as two encores: "The Knife" and "The Fountain of Salmacis".
- The Selling England setlist comprised six of the eight songs from the titular album ("After the Ordeal" and "Aisle of Plenty" were not performed), and a selection of live favourites: "Watcher of the Skies", "The Musical Box", "Supper's Ready" and "The Knife". "Horizons" and "The Return of the Giant Hogweed" were sometimes played instead of "More Fool Me" and "The Knife", respectively.
- The Lamb shows comprised the entirety of the 1974 album, plus "The Musical Box" and "Watcher of the Skies" or "The Knife".
- The A Trick of the Tail shows comprised the following numbers: "Dance on a Volcano", a medley from The Lamb ("The Lamb Lies Down on Broadway"/"Fly on a Windshield"/"Broadway Melody of 1974"/"Carpet Crawlers"), "The Cinema Show", "Robbery, Assault and Battery", "White Mountain", "Firth of Fifth", "Entangled/Squonk", "Supper's Ready", "I Know What I Like (in Your Wardrobe)" and "Los Endos" with an encore of "It/Watcher of the Skies". "The Cinema Show" featured extensive double drumming from Collins and Bruford as did "Supper's Ready", and "Los Endos". "Watcher of the Skies" was a short instrumental version merging the beginning and ending sections of the song.

== Members ==
Current

- Denis Gagné ("Peter Gabriel") 1995–present – lead vocals, flute, occasional percussion (he also represented Phil Collins as a vocalist during the Trick of the Tail tour, and did the same for the first act of the Genesis Extravaganza tour)
- Sébastien Lamothe ("Mike Rutherford") 1993–present – bass, bass pedals, 12-string guitar, vocals, musical director
- François Gagnon ("Steve Hackett") 2004–present – 6-string electric and acoustic guitars, 12-string guitar
- Ian Benhamou ("Tony Banks") 2018–present – keyboards, 12-string guitar, vocals
- Marc Laflamme ("Phil Collins") 2008–2018, 2022–present, drums, percussion, vocals

Former members

- Marc Léveillé ("Peter Gabriel") 1993–1994 – lead vocals, percussion
- Pierre Veilleux ("Tony Banks") 1993–1994 – keyboards
- David Myers ("Tony Banks") 1993–2001, 2003 – keyboards
- François Richard ("Tony Banks") 2002 – keyboards
- Éric Savard ("Tony Banks") 2004–2006 – keyboards
- André Lépine ("Tony Banks") 2007–2010 – keyboards
- Michel Cloutier ("Tony Banks") 2011–2012 – keyboards, 12-string guitar, vocals
- Guillaume Rivard ("Tony Banks") 2013–2018 – keyboards, 12-string guitar, vocals
- Christian Hebert ("Steve Hackett") 1993–2003 – guitars
- Denis Champoux ("Steve Hackett") 1993–2004 – guitars
- Martin Levac ("Phil Collins") 2002–2007 – drums, percussion, vocals
- Gregg Bendian ("Phil Collins", "Bill Bruford") 2007–2013 – drums, percussion
- Guillaume Courteau ("Phil Collins") 2013–2018 – drums, percussion
- Antoine Baril ("Phil Collins") 2019 – drums, percussion
- Bob St-Laurent ("Phil Collins") 2018–2021 – drums, percussion, vocals

Timeline
