= Dancing with the Moonlit Knight =

Song by Genesis

from the album Selling England by the Pound
- Released: 28 September 1973
- Recorded: August 1973
- Genre: Progressive rock; jazz fusion
- Length: 8:02
- Label: Charisma
- Songwriters: Tony Banks, Phil Collins, Peter Gabriel, Steve Hackett, Mike Rutherford
- Producers: John Burns, Genesis

"Dancing with the Moonlit Knight" is a song by the progressive rock band Genesis. It was released on their 1973 album Selling England by the Pound. The song was originally going to be titled "Disney."

The later Phil Collins-era Genesis song "Paperlate," released in 1982, was conceived during a soundcheck rehearsal of "Dancing with the Moonlit Knight" and derives its title from the line "Paper late, cried a voice in the crowd."

== Recording ==
The song was developed from several brief piano pieces composed by frontman Peter Gabriel, which were later combined with some of Steve Hackett's guitar figures to make up the song.

Gabriel contributed English-themed lyrics to "Dancing with the Moonlit Knight," because the music press thought that Genesis were putting too much effort into appealing to the American audiences. He also included some references to Green Shield Stamps in the lyrics. Rolling Stone wrote that the song was an "epic commentary on contemporary England."

The song's ending, which contains a number of 12-string guitar figures, was originally supposed to segue into "The Cinema Show" (another song on the album) to make a song of around 20 minutes in length. This idea was scrapped, because it was too similar in length to the 23-minute song "Supper's Ready" from Foxtrot, the band's previous record.

In an interview, Hackett said of the song:

That tune started off with the influence of a Scottish song, then it moved into something that I think of in a more elegiac way — something nostalgic and wistful, and common to a lot of Genesis tunes. Then it bursts forth, it fights off its shackles, really takes off like a rocket, into another section, which seems to borrow from something that sounds more Russian in a way. It’s European, but then at times, it turns into the jazz that I liked originally — but big band, with the accents.

== Live ==
When performed live, "Dancing with the Moonlit Knight" had Gabriel dressed in a Union Jack dress, helmet and lance. The song was performed in 1973 and the year after, but was dropped from the band's setlist once The Lamb Lies Down on Broadway was released, and only rarely did it show up afterwards. The song was most recently performed as part of the encore for The Last Domino? Tour in 2021 as a medley with "The Carpet Crawlers" (as they had previously in 1980).

"Dancing with the Moonlit Knight" was performed at the band's 1982 reunion show with Gabriel (Gabriel had originally left Genesis in 1975). Gabriel performed the opening verse of the song twice in 2016, once with Sting on vocals before segueing into "Message in a Bottle", and once on his own. This was the first time he had performed a Genesis song in 34 years.

== Reception ==
Ultimate Classic Rock wrote that despite the puns in the song being a bit over the top at times, the band performs at its musical peak in "Dancing with the Moonlit Knight." Dailyvault's ranking of Peter Gabriel-era Genesis songs describes "Dancing with the Moonlit Knight" as a "lovely a cappella vocal intro, then the song goes through several twists and turns before a slow, moody fadeout. It’s such growth from Nursery Cryme only two years prior, and it cemented the original sound that these guys had…less show-off than ELP, more approachable than Yes, funnier than King Crimson." Chris Jones of BBC Music wrote that the song "gives the perfect snapshot of what Genesis were about at this point."

Genesis' bassist Mike Rutherford said that he thought the song was a good opener for Selling England by the Pound, but he was less happy about the whole song overall, as he said it was "a bit busy."

== Personnel ==
- Peter Gabriel – lead vocals, flute, percussion
- Tony Banks – Hammond organ, piano, ARP Pro Soloist synthesizer, Mellotron
- Steve Hackett – electric guitar, 12-string guitar
- Mike Rutherford – 12-string guitar, bass guitar
- Phil Collins – drums, assorted percussion, backing vocals
