= Six of the Best =

1982 reunion concert of the rock band Genesis

Six of the Best was a reunion concert between the English rock band Genesis and their original frontman Peter Gabriel, with former guitarist Steve Hackett joining the band for the two encores. The one-off event took place on 2 October 1982 at the Milton Keynes Bowl, England, and staged as a benefit to raise funds for Gabriel who faced considerable financial debts after the first WOMAD festival. It was the only time Gabriel and Hackett have performed with the band since their departures in 1975 and 1977, respectively.

== Background ==
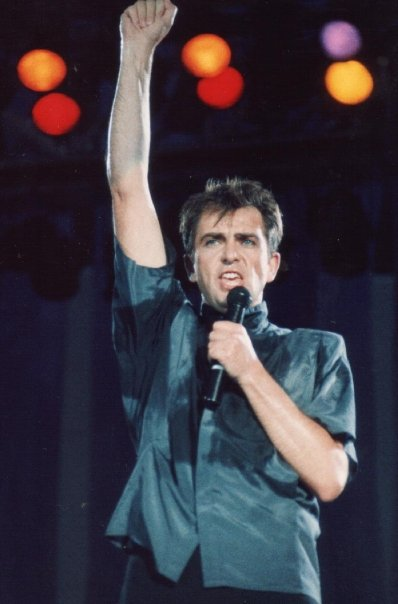
The concert reunited Genesis with original frontman Peter Gabriel

The "classic" line-up of Genesis featured frontman Peter Gabriel, bassist/guitarist Mike Rutherford, keyboardist Tony Banks, drummer Phil Collins, and guitarist Steve Hackett. After Gabriel left the band to pursue a solo career in 1975, Hackett followed suit in 1977, leaving Genesis as a core trio of Banks, Rutherford, and Collins, who took over from Gabriel as lead vocalist on subsequent albums and live shows.

The concert originated after Gabriel helped to stage the first World of Music, Arts and Dance (WOMAD) festival, held in Shepton Mallet, England in July 1982. Although an artistic success it was a commercial failure for several reasons including poor weather, a national rail strike affecting transport to the venue, and a lack of publicity and understanding surrounding the world music event that led to poor ticket sales. The venture left Gabriel in considerable financial hardship with debts as high as £200,000, and received "a lot of nasty phone calls and a death threat." The dire situation was helped when Gabriel's manager Tony Smith, who also managed Genesis, suggested a one-off reunion concert as a benefit to raise funds for Gabriel. Genesis were on the road with the Three Sides Live tour at this time, and therefore had the necessary staging and equipment to put on the show. The tour finished with three nights at London's Hammersmith Odeon between 28–30 September, during which the band rehearsed a revised setlist with Gabriel. Hackett, who was recording in Brazil, got the invite to perform and quickly flew to London to join the band in Hammersmith for rehearsals, flying mostly overnight. He was keen to have done more with the band, but was asked to only play on the two encores.

== The concert ==
The show took place on 2 October, which was also Rutherford's 32nd birthday, to an estimated 40,000 people. Tickets were sold at £9 for advance purchases and £10 for people arriving on the day. The show opened with fellow Charisma Records artists John Martyn, The Blues Band, and Talk Talk, the latter were faced with a hostile reaction from the crowd and cans and bottles were thrown towards the stage during their set. Genesis were introduced by Jonathan King, who named the band in 1967 and supervised the recording of their first album. Gabriel entered the stage in a coffin carried to the stage by four pallbearers, a stunt that was not known by the group prior to the show.

In 2015, Rutherford expressed his regret that the concert had not been recorded or filmed. Several audience recordings of the show have been released.

== Setlist ==
1. "Back in N.Y.C." (from The Lamb Lies Down on Broadway)
2. "Dancing with the Moonlit Knight" (intro and first verse only) (from Selling England by the Pound)
3. "The Carpet Crawlers" (from The Lamb Lies Down on Broadway)
4. "Firth of Fifth" (from Selling England by the Pound)
5. "The Musical Box" (from Nursery Cryme)
6. "Solsbury Hill" (from Peter Gabriel)
7. "Turn It On Again" (from Duke)
8. "The Lamb Lies Down on Broadway" (from The Lamb Lies Down on Broadway)
9. "Fly on a Windshield" (from The Lamb Lies Down on Broadway)
10. "Broadway Melody of 1974" (from The Lamb Lies Down on Broadway)
11. "In the Cage" (from The Lamb Lies Down on Broadway)
12. "Supper's Ready" (from Foxtrot)

Encore

13. "I Know What I Like (In Your Wardrobe)" (from Selling England by the Pound, featuring elements of "Stagnation" from Trespass)
14. "The Knife" (from Trespass)

== Personnel ==
Genesis

- Peter Gabriel – lead vocals, drums on "Turn It On Again"
- Phil Collins – drums, percussion, backing vocals, lead vocals on "Turn It On Again"
- Tony Banks – keyboards, backing vocals
- Mike Rutherford – guitars, bass, backing vocals
- Steve Hackett – guitars on "I Know What I Like (In Your Wardrobe)" and "The Knife"

Additional musicians

- Daryl Stuermer – guitars
- Chester Thompson – drums, percussion
