= Selling England by the Pound Tour =

1973–74 concert tour by Genesis

- Tour by Genesis
- Poster to the concert in Cleveland, USA
- Location: Europe; North America
- Associated album: Selling England by the Pound
- Start date: 19 September 1973
- End date: 6 May 1974
- Legs: 3
- No. of shows: 112 (115 scheduled)

Genesis concert chronology
- Foxtrot Tour (1972–73); Selling England by the Pound Tour (1973–74); The Lamb Lies Down on Broadway Tour (1974–75)

The Selling England by the Pound Tour was a concert tour by the English rock band Genesis, to promote their album Selling England by the Pound. The tour began on 19 September 1973 in Paris, France, and concluded on 6 May 1974 in New York City, USA.

== Background ==
Initially the band were to perform with a new and more elaborate stage set than before, that included inflatable objects with projected images, but a change in fire regulations following the Summerland disaster in August 1973 led to the idea being scrapped. Gabriel devised new stories before songs, and wore a full costume with a helmet and shield representing the Britannia character for "Dancing With the Moonlit Knight" and sang "The Battle of Epping Forest" with a stocking over his head.

The tour began with a sold-out tour of the UK, but had to cancel the first date at the Green's Playhouse, Glasgow due to electrical safety issues minutes before its start. The group realised they were substantially in debt and needed better management, so recruited Tony Smith (no relation to Charisma boss Tony Stratton Smith). In October 1973 a pair of dates in the tour were filmed by Charisma for a possible cinema release, but the plan was rejected by the band who felt the film was not up to standard. Instead, the band performed a five-song set in front of an invited audience at Shepperton Studios that was filmed and broadcast as Tony Stratton Smith Presents Genesis in Concert. The group returned to the U.S. in December 1973 to perform six shows in three nights at The Roxy in Los Angeles, and a performance of "Watcher of the Skies" and "The Musical Box" on the late-night television show The Midnight Special. January 1974 saw the band perform five nights at Theatre Royal, Drury Lane, at which Gabriel was lifted in the air by a wire during "Supper's Ready".

== Tour dates ==
List of 1973 concerts
| Date | City | Country | Venue |
|---|---|---|---|
| 19 September 1973 | Paris | France | Olympia Theatre |
| 22 September 1973 | Hamburg | Germany | Musikhalle |
| 23 September 1973 | Osnabrück | Germany | Stadttheater Osnabrück |
| 25 September 1973 | Osnabrück | Germany | Stadttheater Osnabrück |
| 26 September 1973 | Hamm | Germany | Kurhaus |
| 27 September 1973 | Darmstadt | Germany | Staatstheater Darmstadt |
| 29 September 1973 | Lausanne | Switzerland | Palais de Beaulieu |
| 30 September 1973 | Frankfurt | Germany | Festhalle Frankfurt |
| 5 October 1973 | Glasgow | Scotland | The Apollo |
| 6 October 1973 | Manchester | England | Manchester Opera House |
| 7 October 1973 | Oxford | England | New Theatre Oxford |
| 9 October 1973 | Glasgow | Scotland | The Apollo |
| 11 October 1973 | Southampton | England | Gaumont Theatre |
| 12 October 1973 | Bournemouth | England | Bournemouth Winter Gardens |
| 15 October 1973 | Brighton | England | Brighton Dome |
| 16 October 1973 | Bristol | England | Colston Hall |
| 18 October 1973 | Leicester | England | De Montfort Hall |
| 19 October 1973 | London | England | Rainbow Theatre |
| 20 October 1973 | London | England | Rainbow Theatre |
| 23 October 1973 | Liverpool | England | Liverpool Empire Theatre |
| 25 October 1973 | Sheffield | England | Sheffield City Hall |
| 26 October 1973 | Newcastle upon Tyne | England | Newcastle City Hall |
| 28 October 1973 | Birmingham | England | Birmingham Hippodrome |
| 30 October 1973 | Surrey | England | Shepperton Studios |
| 1 November 1973 | Surrey | England | Shepperton Studios |
| 7 November 1973 | Quebec City | Canada | Capitole Theatre |
| 8 November 1973 | Toronto | Canada | Massey Hall |
| 9 November 1973 | Kingston | Canada | Queen's University |
| 10 November 1973 | Montreal | Canada | University of Quebec Sports Arena |
| 11 November 1973 | Buffalo | United States | State University Auditorium |
| 13 November 1973 | Lawrence | United States | Kosh Auditorium |
| 15 November 1973 | Upper Darby Township | United States | Tower Theater |
| 17 November 1973 | Medford | United States | Tufts University |
| 18 November 1973 | Paramus | United States | Bergen Community College |
| 22 November 1973 | New York City | United States | Felt Forum |
| 24 November 1973 | Princeton | United States | McCarter Theatre |
| 26 November 1973 | Miami | United States | Gusman Hall |
| 27 November 1973 | Rochester | United States | Rochester Institute of Technology |
| 29 November 1973 | Columbus | United States | The Agora |
| 30 November 1973 | Cleveland | United States | Allen Theatre |
| 1 December 1973 | Buffalo | United States | University of Buffalo |
| 3 December 1973 | Evanston | United States | Northwestern University Cahn Auditorium |
| 7 December 1973 | Fort Wayne | United States | Purdue University Fort Wayne, Student Union Ballroom |
| 8 December 1973 | Ypsilanti | United States | Pease Auditorium |
| 9 December 1973 | Toledo | United States | Hara Theatre |
| 10 December 1973 | Detroit | United States | Ford Auditorium |
| 17 December 1973 | West Hollywood | United States | Roxy Theatre |
| 18 December 1973 | West Hollywood | United States | Roxy Theatre |
| 19 December 1973 | West Hollywood | United States | Roxy Theatre |

List of 1974 concerts
| Date | City | Country | Venue |
|---|---|---|---|
| 13 January 1974 | Bristol | England | Bristol Hippodome |
| 15 January 1974 | London | England | Theatre Royal |
| 16 January 1974 | London | England | Theatre Royal |
| 18 January 1974 | London | England | Theatre Royal |
| 19 January 1974 | London | England | Theatre Royal |
| 20 January 1974 | London | England | Theatre Royal |
| 26 January 1974 | Brussels | Belgium | Forest National |
| 28 January 1974 | Winterthur | Switzerland | Eulachhalle |
| 30 January 1974 | Düsseldorf | Germany | Philipshalle |
| 31 January 1974 | Offenbach am Main | Germany | Stadthalle Offenbach |
| 3 February 1974 | Turin | Italy | PalaRuffini |
| 4 February 1974 | Reggio Emilia | Italy | Palasport |
| 5 February 1974 | Rome | Italy | Palazzetto dello Sport |
| 6 February 1974 | Naples | Italy | Teatro Mediterraneo |
| 8 February 1974 | Winterthur | Switzerland | Salle Vaubier |
| 9 February 1974 | Marseille | France | Palais des Sports |
| 10 February 1974 | Lyon | France | Palais d'Hiver |
| 1 March 1974 | Passaic | United States | Capitol Theatre |
| 2 March 1974 | Upper Darby Township | United States | Tower Theater |
| 3 March 1974 | Upper Darby Township | United States | Tower Theater |
| 4 March 1974 | Baltimore | United States | East Wind Ballroom |
| 5 March 1974 | Washington, D.C. | United States | Warner Theatre |
| 7 March 1974 | Fort Wayne | United States | Allen County War Memorial Coliseum |
| 8 March 1974 | Atlanta | United States | Fox Theatre |
| 9 March 1974 | Coral Gables | United States | University of Miami, Maurice Gusman Concert Hall |
| 12 March 1974 | Nashville | United States | Muther's Music Emporium |
| 13 March 1974 | Memphis | United States | Ellis Auditorium |
| 17 March 1974 | Austin | United States | Armadillo World Headquarters |
| 20 March 1974 | Phoenix | United States | Phoenix Civic Plaza |
| 21 March 1974 | Santa Monica | United States | Santa Monica Civic Auditorium |
| 22 March 1974 | Santa Monica | United States | Santa Monica Civic Auditorium |
| 24 March 1974 | San Francisco | United States | Winterland Ballroom |
| 26 March 1974 | Seattle | United States | Seattle Center Arena |
| 27 March 1974 | Vancouver | Canada | PNE Garden Auditorium |
| 2 April 1974 | New York City | United States | Avery Fisher Hall |
| 3 April 1974 | Davenport | United States | RKO Orpheum Theater |
| 4 April 1974 | Fort Wayne | United States | Embassy Theatre |
| 5 April 1974 | Fort Wayne | United States | National Guard Armory |
| 6 April 1974 | Toledo | United States | University of Toledo, Student Union Auditorium |
| 7 April 1974 | Columbus | United States | Agora Ballroom |
| 10 April 1974 | Philadelphia | United States | Spectrum |
| 11 April 1974 | Chicago | United States | Auditorium Theatre |
| 12 April 1974 | Indianapolis | United States | Indiana Convention Center |
| 13 April 1974 | St. Louis | United States | Kiel Auditorium |
| 14 April 1974 | Kansas City | United States | Memorial Hall |
| 16 April 1974 | Detroit | United States | Ford Auditorium |
| 17 April 1974 | Evanston | United States | McGaw Memorial Hall |
| 18 April 1974 | Quebec City | Canada | Centre Municipal des Congres |
| 19 April 1974 | Ottawa | Canada | Ottawa Civic Centre |
| 20 April 1974 | Montreal | Canada | CEPSUM |
| 21 April 1974 | Montreal | Canada | CEPSUM |
| 22 April 1974 | Rochester | United States | Auditorium Theater |
| 24 April 1974 | Boston | United States | Music Hall |
| 25 April 1974 | Allentown | United States | Allentown Fairgrounds |
| 27 April 1974 | Buffalo | United States | Century Theatre |
| 28 April 1974 | Cleveland | United States | Allen Theatre |
| 29 April 1974 | Cleveland | United States | Allen Theatre |
| 1 May 1974 | New York City | United States | Academy of Music |
| 2 May 1974 | Toronto | Canada | Massey Hall |
| 3 May 1974 | Pittsburgh | United States | Syria Mosque |
| 4 May 1974 | New York City | United States | Academy of Music |
| 6 May 1974 | New York City | United States | Academy of Music |

== Personnel ==
- Peter Gabriel – vocals, flute, percussion
- Tony Banks – Hohner Pianet, RMI Electra Piano, Hammond Organ, Mellotron, ARP Pro Soloist synthesizer, acoustic 12-string guitar, backing vocals
- Steve Hackett – electric guitar, acoustic 12-string guitar, electric sitar
- Michael Rutherford – bass, bass pedals, acoustic and electric 12-string guitars, backing vocals
- Phil Collins – drums, percussion, backing vocals; lead vocals on "More Fool Me"
