= The Lamb Lies Down on Broadway Tour =

1974–75 concert tour by Genesis

- Tour by Genesis
- Location: Europe; North America
- Associated album: The Lamb Lies Down on Broadway
- Start date: 20 November 1974
- End date: 22 May 1975
- Legs: 2
- No. of shows: 104 (108 scheduled)

Genesis concert chronology
- Selling England by the Pound Tour (1973–74); The Lamb Lies Down on Broadway Tour (1974–75); A Trick of the Tail Tour (1976)

The Lamb Lies Down on Broadway Tour was a concert tour by English rock band Genesis. It began on 20 November 1974 in Chicago, ended on 22 May 1975 in Besançon, France, and promoted their 1974 album of the same name. At each show, the album was played in its entirety, with one or two older songs as encores. The group's final tour with singer Peter Gabriel, it was marked by extensive theatricality, with multiple costumes worn by Gabriel, three backdrop screens that displayed 1,450 slides from eight projectors, laser lighting, and practical effects.

== Overview ==
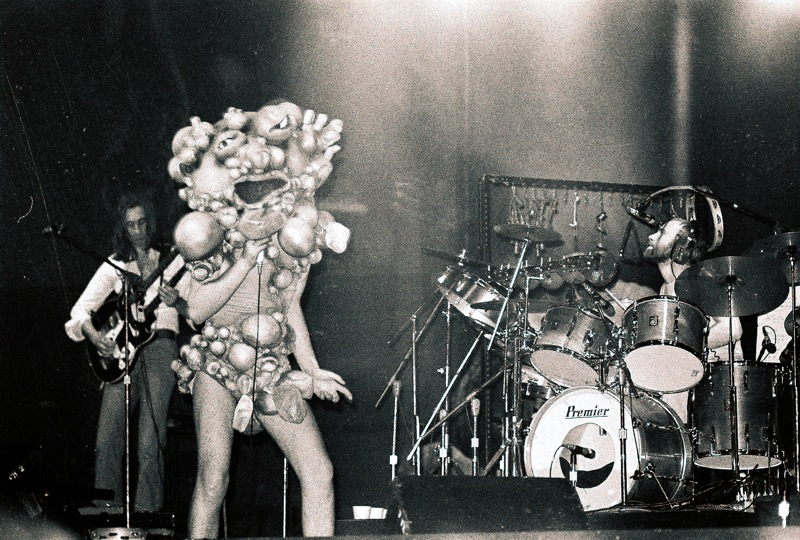
Rutherford, Gabriel, and Collins performing at Chicago's Auditorium Theatre on 20 November 1974. Gabriel is wearing the Slipperman costume.

Genesis supported the album with a tour across North America and Europe, playing the album in its entirety with one or two older songs as encores. Such a format was not supported by the entire band considering most of the audience were not yet familiar with the large amount of new material. The tour was scheduled to begin on 29 October 1974 with an 11-date tour of the UK that sold out within four hours of going on sale, but they were rescheduled for 1975 after guitarist Steve Hackett had crushed a wine glass in his left hand which severed a tendon and needed time to recover. The group lost money as they were unable to recoup deposits they had paid the venues. The tour began on 20 November in Chicago, and ended on 22 May 1975 in Besançon, France. The last two scheduled concerts, on 24 May in Toulouse, were cancelled due to low ticket sales. Hackett estimated the band's debts at £220,000 at the tour's end.

The tour featured at the time some of the biggest instruments used by the band, including Rutherford's double-neck Rickenbacker guitar / Microfrets six-stringed bass and the largest drum kit ever used by Collins. The tour's stage show involved three backdrop screens that displayed 1,450 slides, designed by artist Jeffrey Shaw, from eight projectors and a laser lighting display. Banks claims that the slides came close to working perfectly on only four or five occasions. Gabriel changed his appearance with a short haircut and styled facial hair and dressed as Rael in a leather jacket, T-shirt and jeans. During "The Lamia", he surrounded himself with a spinning cone-like structure decorated with images of snakes. In the last verse, the cone would collapse to reveal Gabriel wearing a body suit that glowed from lights placed under the stage. "The Colony of Slippermen" featured Gabriel as one of the Slippermen, covered in lumps with inflatable genitalia that emerged onto the stage by crawling out of a penis-shaped tube. Gabriel recalled the difficulty in placing his microphone near his mouth while in the costume. "Phil Collins hated the Slipperman outfit," Gabriel admitted to Mark Blake. "In fact, the whole band did, especially the fact that it had these huge inflatable testicles… But I was acting out a character and the audience were getting off on it. I was the interpreter between the band and the audience. Actually, Phil always appreciated that, but I don't think the others always did." Collins admitted at times the tour was ostentatious and "inspiration for Spinal Tap". For "it.", an explosion set off twin strobe lights that reveal Gabriel and a dummy figure dressed identically on each side of the stage, leaving the audience clueless as to which was real. The performance ended with Gabriel vanishing from the stage in a flash of light and a puff of smoke. During the final concert of the tour, roadie Geoff Banks acted as the dummy on stage, wearing nothing but a leather jacket.

In one concert review, the theatrics for "The Musical Box", the show's finale and once the band's stage highlight, was seen as "crude and elementary" compared to the "sublime grandeur" of The Lamb... set. Music critics often focused their reviews on Gabriel's theatrics and took the band's musical performance as secondary, which irritated the other members. Collins later said, "People would steam straight past Tony, Mike, Steve and I, go straight up to Peter and say, "You're fantastic, we really enjoyed the show." It was becoming a one-man show to the audience." The Rock and Roll Hall of Fame called the tour "a spectacle on par with anything attempted in the world of rock to that point".

=== Gabriel's departure ===
During their stop in Cleveland in November 1974, Gabriel told the band he would leave at the conclusion of the tour. The decision was kept a secret from outsiders and media all through the tour, and Gabriel promised the band to stay silent about it for a while after its end in June 1975, to give them some time to prepare for a future without him. By August, the news had leaked to the media anyway, and Gabriel wrote a personal statement to the English music press titled "Out, Angels Out" to explain his reasons and his view of his career up to this point; the piece was printed in several of the major rock music magazines. In his open letter, he explained his disillusion with the music industry and his wish to spend extended time with his family. Banks later stated, "Pete was also getting too big for the group. He was being portrayed as if he was 'the man' and it really wasn't like that. It was a very difficult thing to accommodate. So it was actually a bit of a relief."

== Recordings ==
A complete performance of the album, from 24 January 1975 at the Shrine Auditorium in Los Angeles, was released in 2025 as part of The Lamb Lies Down on Broadway 50th Anniversary Super Deluxe Edition. Prior to that release, the majority of the same performance was available on the Genesis Archive 1967–75 box set. Some tracks feature re-recorded vocals from Gabriel and guitar parts from Hackett, while the rendition of "it." was replaced with a remixed studio version with re-recorded vocals. A more complete recording of the same show, including Gabriel's narrative interludes, the original live version of "it.", and the encore ("Watcher of the Skies" and "The Musical Box"), has been distributed unofficially via bootleg recordings and the grey market.

The 2007 reissue of The Lamb Lies Down on Broadway features the album with a visual reconstruction of the tour's stage show using the original backdrop slides, audience bootleg footage, and photographs.

The band's performance from Empire Pool, London, on 15 April 1975 was also recorded and partially broadcast by the BBC. Only the encore "Watcher of the Skies" has been released officially on the BBC Broadcasts set.

== Personnel ==
- Peter Gabriel – lead vocals, flute, varied instruments, "experiments with foreign sounds"
- Tony Banks – Hammond T-102 organ, RMI 368x Electra Piano and Harpsichord, Mellotron M-400, ARP Pro Soloist synthesizer, Elka Rhapsody string synthesizer, backing vocals
- Steve Hackett – acoustic and electric guitars
- Mike Rutherford – bass guitar, bass pedals, 12-string guitar, backing vocals
- Phil Collins – drums, percussion, vibraphone, backing vocals; second lead vocal on "The Colony of Slippermen"

== Set list ==
An average set list for this tour is as follows:

1. "The Lamb Lies Down on Broadway"
2. "Fly on a Windshield"
3. "Broadway Melody of 1974"
4. "Cuckoo Cocoon"
5. "In the Cage"
6. "The Grand Parade of Lifeless Packaging"
7. "Back in N.Y.C."
8. "Hairless Heart"
9. "Counting Out Time"
10. "The Carpet Crawlers"
11. "The Chamber of 32 Doors"
12. "Lilywhite Lilith"
13. "The Waiting Room"
14. "Anyway"
15. "Here Comes the Supernatural Anaesthetist"
16. "The Lamia"
17. "Silent Sorrow in Empty Boats"
18. "The Colony of Slippermen"
19. "Ravine"
20. "The Light Dies Down on Broadway"
21. "Riding the Scree"
22. "In the Rapids"
23. "it"

Encore

25. Any one, or occasionally two, of "The Musical Box" [67x], "Watcher of the Skies" [35x], and "The Knife" [7x]

If two songs were played during the encore, "The Musical Box" would be the song played first, with either "Watcher of the Skies" or "The Knife" played afterwards.

== Tour dates ==
List of 1974 concerts
Date	City	Country	Venue
20 November 1974	Chicago	United States	Auditorium Theatre
21 November 1974	Chicago	United States	Auditorium Theatre
22 November 1974	Indianapolis	United States	Indiana Convention Center
23 November 1974	St. Louis	United States	Ambassador Theatre
25 November 1974	Cleveland	United States	Music Hall
26 November 1974	Cleveland	United States	Music Hall
27 November 1974	Columbus	United States	Ohio Theatre
28 November 1974	Detroit	United States	Detroit Masonic Temple
29 November 1974	Fort Wayne	United States	National Guard Armory
30 November 1974	Pittsburgh	United States	Syria Mosque
1 December 1974	Baltimore	United States	Lyric Opera House
3 December 1974	Washington, D.C.	United States	Warner Theater
4 December 1974	Richmond	United States	Mosque Theater
5 December 1974	Philadelphia	United States	Philadelphia Convention Hall and Civic Center
6 December 1974	New York City	United States	Academy of Music
7 December 1974	New York City	United States	Academy of Music
8 December 1974	Providence	United States	Palace Concert Theater
9 December 1974	Boston	United States	Music Hall
11 December 1974	Albany	United States	Palace Theatre
12 December 1974	Waterbury	United States	Palace Theater
13 December 1974	Passaic	United States	Capitol Theatre
~~14 December 1974~~	~~Indianapolis~~	United States	~~Market Square Arena~~
15 December 1974	Montreal	Canada	Montreal Forum
16 December 1974	Toronto	Canada	Maple Leaf Gardens
17 December 1974	Rochester	United States	Auditorium Theatre
18 December 1974	Buffalo	United States	Century Theatre

List of 1975 concerts
Date	City	Country	Venue
9 January 1975	West Palm Beach	United States	West Palm Beach Auditorium
10 January 1975	West Palm Beach	United States	West Palm Beach Auditorium
11 January 1975	Lakeland	United States	Lakeland Civic Center
13 January 1975	Atlanta	United States	Municipal Auditorium
15 January 1975	New Orleans	United States	New Orleans Music Hall
17 January 1975	Houston	United States	Houston Music Hall
~~18 January 1975~~	~~University Park~~	United States	~~McFarlin Auditorium~~
19 January 1975	Oklahoma City	United States	Civic Center Music Hall
20 January 1975	Phoenix	United States	Phoenix Civic Center
21 January 1975	Boulder	United States	Macky Auditorium
22 January 1975	Berkeley	United States	Berkeley Community Theatre
24 January 1975	Los Angeles	United States	Shrine Auditorium
25 January 1975	San Diego	United States	San Diego Civic Theatre
~~26 January 1975~~	~~Berkeley~~	United States	~~Berkeley Community Theatre~~
28 January 1975	Phoenix	United States	Civic Plaza Assembly Hall
1 February 1975	Kansas City	United States	Kansas Memorial Hall
2 February 1975	Grand Rapids	United States	Grand Valley State University
3 February 1975	Fort Wayne	United States	Allen County War Memorial Coliseum
4 February 1975	Chicago	United States	Arie Crown Theater
19 February 1975	Oslo	Norway	Ekeberghallen
21 February 1975	Copenhagen	Denmark	Falkoner Center
22 February 1975	Hanover	West Germany	Niedersachsenhalle
23 February 1975	West Berlin	West Germany	Eissporthalle
24 February 1975	Amsterdam	Netherlands	Royal Theater Carré
25 February 1975	Amsterdam	Netherlands	Royal Theater Carré
26 February 1975	Cambrai	France	Palais des Grottes
28 February 1975	Colmar	France	Théâtre du Parc des Expositions
1 March 1975	Dijon	France	Palais des Sports de Dijon
2 March 1975	Saint-Étienne	France	Palais des Sports de Saint-Étienne
3 March 1975	Paris	France	Palais des Sports
6 March 1975	Cascais	Portugal	Pavilhão do Dramático de Cascais
7 March 1975	Cascais	Portugal	Pavilhão do Dramático de Cascais
9 March 1975	Badalona	Spain	Nuevo Pabellón Club Juventud
10 March 1975	Badalona	Spain	Nuevo Pabellón Club Juventud
11 March 1975	Madrid	Spain	Pabellón del Real Madrid
17 March 1975	Paris	France	Palais des Sports
22 March 1975	Annecy	France	Salle d'Expositions
24 March 1975	Turin	Italy	PalaRuffini
26 March 1975	Offenburg	West Germany	Ortenauhalle
27 March 1975	Nuremberg	West Germany	Messezentrum
29 March 1975	Bern	Switzerland	Festhalle
30 March 1975	Saarbrücken	West Germany	Saarlandhalle
1 April 1975	Ludwigshafen	West Germany	Friedrich-Ebert-Halle
2 April 1975	Stuttgart	West Germany	Killesberghalle
3 April 1975	Frankfurt	West Germany	Jahrhunderthalle
4 April 1975	Munich	West Germany	Rudi-Sedlmayer-Halle
5 April 1975	Eppelheim	West Germany	Rhein-Neckar-Halle
6 April 1975	Düsseldorf	West Germany	Philips Halle
7 April 1975	Dortmund	West Germany	Westfalenhallen
8 April 1975	Hamburg	West Germany	Congress Center Hamburg
10 April 1975	Groningen	Netherlands	Martinihal-Centrum
11 April 1975	Rotterdam	Netherlands	Sportpaleis
12 April 1975	Brussels	Belgium	Forest National
14 April 1975	London	England	Empire Pool
15 April 1975	London	England	Empire Pool
16 April 1975	Southampton	England	Gaumont Theatre
18 April 1975	Liverpool	England	Liverpool Empire Theatre
19 April 1975	Liverpool	England	Liverpool Empire Theatre
20 April 1975	Liverpool	England	Liverpool Empire Theatre
22 April 1975	Edinburgh	Scotland	Usher Hall
23 April 1975	Edinburgh	Scotland	Usher Hall
24 April 1975	Newcastle upon Tyne	England	Newcastle City Hall
25 April 1975	Newcastle upon Tyne	England	Newcastle City Hall
27 April 1975	Manchester	England	Palace Theatre
28 April 1975	Manchester	England	Palace Theatre
29 April 1975	Bristol	England	Colston Hall
30 April 1975	Bristol	England	Colston Hall
1 May 1975	Birmingham	England	Birmingham Hippodrome
2 May 1975	Birmingham	England	Birmingham Hippodrome
8 May 1975	Antwerp	Belgium	Sportpaleis
9 May 1975	Bremen	West Germany	Stadthalle Bremen
10 May 1975	Kiel	West Germany	Ostseehalle
11 May 1975	Essen	West Germany	Grugahalle
12 May 1975	Wiesbaden	West Germany	Rhein am Main Halle
13 May 1975	Münster	West Germany	Halle Münsterland
15 May 1975	Reims	France	Patinoire
16 May 1975	Reims	France	Patinoire
18 May 1975	San Sebastián	Spain	Velódromo de San Sebastián
20 May 1975	Paris	France	Palais des Sports
21 May 1975	Cambrai	France	Palais des Grottes
22 May 1975	Besançon	France	Palais des Sports de Besançon
~~24 May 1975~~	~~Toulouse~~	France	~~Parc des Expositions~~
