= Ada Swanwick =

English artist, novelist and art teacher

Betty Swanwick
- Born: Ada Elizabeth Edith Swanwick; 22 May 1915; London
- Died: 22 May 1989 (aged 74); Tunbridge Wells, England
- Education: Goldsmiths College; Royal College of Art; Central School of Arts and Crafts
- Occupations: Artist and educator

Ada Elizabeth Edith Swanwick RA (1915–1989), better known as Betty Swanwick, was an English artist, novelist and art teacher. She was head of illustration at Goldsmiths College and is known for her work for London Transport and an album cover for Genesis.

== Life ==
Ada Elizabeth Edith Swanwick was born in Forest Hill in London in 1915. Her father, Henry Gerard Swanwick, who was in the naval reserve, painted marine watercolours. She was inspired by her father, and her mother, Ethel Priscilla (née Bacon), gave her pencils which she had retrieved from shipwrecks on the Scilly Isles.

Swanwick enrolled at Goldsmiths College at the age of fifteen and by 1934 she was simultaneously attending classes at Goldsmith's, the Royal College of Art and the Central School of Arts and Crafts. She was a student of Edward Bawden. This academic activity continued until 1936.

Swanwick started to create work for London Transport in 1936 and she continued to create posters for them until 1954.

In 1945 she published the first of her novels The Cross Purposes in 1945. She published, Hoodwinked which featured pencil illustrations. She appears as 'Bertha Swan' in a short story, "The Party", written by her fellow Goldsmiths student Denton Welch (in his posthumous collection A Last Sheaf (1951)).

In 1951 the Regatta and the Rocket restaurants at the Festival of Britain included murals by Ben Nicholson and Swanwick. She would later create another mural for Evelina Children's Hospital in 1960.

A painting by Swanwick titled The Dream was used on the cover of the 1973 Genesis album Selling England by the Pound. The original painting did not include a lawn mower; the band had Swanwick add it later as an allusion to the track "I Know What I Like", because Swanwick told them she did not have enough time to paint a new picture for the cover. Her drawings could take 200 hours to create and she had strong views. She was appalled to find that her students did not have to attend life drawing classes.

Swanwick died in 1989. Her life and the intriguing paintings that she made after 1965 are included in the book by her friend Paddy Rossmore.

== Works include ==
- The Cross Purposes (1945)
- Hoodwinked (1957)
- Beauty and the Burglar (1958)

== Bibliography ==
- Bowler, Dave; Dray, Bryan (1992). Genesis: A Biography. Sidgwick & Jackson Ltd. ISBN 978-0-283-06132-5.
