= A Trick of the Tail Tour =

1976 concert tour by Genesis

- Tour by Genesis
- Poster to the concert in Stafford, England
- Location: Europe; North America
- Associated album: A Trick of the Tail
- Start date: 26 March 1976
- End date: 11 July 1976
- No. of shows: 63

Genesis concert chronology
- The Lamb Lies Down on Broadway Tour (1974–75); A Trick of the Tail Tour (1976); Wind & Wuthering Tour (1977)

The A Trick of the Tail Tour was a concert tour by English rock band Genesis. This was the first tour after Peter Gabriel left the band, and the only one with Bill Bruford on drums.

"A lot of the band thought he could sing better than I did anyway," remarked Gabriel of Phil Collins, who took over lead vocals. "The singing side he could handle, but I don't think he enjoyed singing some of my more obscure lyrics."

The tour began on 26 March 1976 in London, Ontario, Canada and ended on 11 July 1976 in Stafford, England. Shows in Glasgow and Stafford were filmed for Genesis: In Concert (1976).

== Setlist ==
1. "Dance on a Volcano"
2. The Lamb Lies Down on Broadway Medley (a.k.a. "Lamb Stew" / "Lamb Casserole" / "Lamb Cutlet")
  1. "The Lamb Lies Down on Broadway"
  2. "Fly on a Windshield"
  3. "Broadway Melody of 1974"
  4. "The Carpet Crawlers"
3. "The Cinema Show"
4. "Robbery, Assault and Battery" (omitted on 25 June 1976)
5. "White Mountain"
6. "Firth of Fifth"
7. "Entangled" (omitted on 15 April 1976)
8. "Squonk" (omitted on 15 April 1976)
9. "Supper's Ready"
10. "I Know What I Like (In Your Wardrobe)"
11. "Los Endos"
12. "it." (omitted on 16 June 1976)
13. "Watcher of the Skies" (omitted on 16 June 1976)

== Tour dates ==
List of 1976 concerts
Date	City	Country	Venue
26 March 1976	London	Canada	London Arena
27 March 1976	Waterloo	Canada	University of Waterloo
28 March 1976	Buffalo	United States	Century Theatre
29 March 1976	Hamilton	Canada	Hamilton Place Theatre
31 March 1976	Toronto	Canada	Maple Leaf Gardens
1 April 1976	Toronto	Canada	Maple Leaf Gardens
2 April 1976	Montreal	Canada	Montreal Forum
3 April 1976	Ottawa	Canada	Ottawa Civic Centre
4 April 1976	Quebec City	Canada	Colisée de Québec
7 April 1976; 2 Shows	Upper Darby	United States	Tower Theater
8 April 1976	New York City	United States	Beacon Theatre
9 April 1976; 2 Shows	New York City	United States	Beacon Theatre
10 April 1976	Boston	United States	Orpheum Theatre
12 April 1976	Baltimore	United States	Lyric Theatre
13 April 1976	Pittsburgh	United States	Syria Mosque
14 April 1976	Cleveland	United States	Cleveland Music Hall
15 April 1976	Cleveland	United States	Cleveland Music Hall
16 April 1976	Chicago	United States	Auditorium Theatre
17 April 1976	Chicago	United States	Auditorium Theatre
19 April 1976	Columbus	United States	Ohio Theatre
20 April 1976	Detroit	United States	Ford Auditorium
21 April 1976	Milwaukee	United States	Riverside Theater
22 April 1976	Grand Rapids	United States	George Welsh Civic Auditorium
23 April 1976	St. Louis	United States	Ambassador Theatre
25 April 1976	Kansas City	United States	Memorial Hall
29 April 1976	Berkeley	United States	Berkeley Community Theatre
30 April 1976	Fresno	United States	Warner Theatre
1 May 1976	Burbank	United States	Starlight Bowl
3 May 1976	San Diego	United States	San Diego Sports Arena
5 May 1976	Austin	United States	Hogg Memorial Auditorium
6 May 1976	Houston	United States	Houston Music Hall
7 May 1976	Fort Worth	United States	Will Rogers Memorial Auditorium
9 June 1976	London	England	Hammersmith Odeon
10 June 1976	London	England	Hammersmith Odeon
11 June 1976	London	England	Hammersmith Odeon
12 June 1976	London	England	Hammersmith Odeon
13 June 1976	London	England	Hammersmith Odeon
14 June 1976	London	England	Hammersmith Odeon
15 June 1976	Cambrai	France	Palais des Grottes
16 June 1976; 2 Shows	The Hague	Netherlands	Congresgebouw
17 June 1976	The Hague	Netherlands	Congresgebouw
18 June 1976	Düsseldorf	West Germany	Philipshalle
19 June 1976	West Berlin	West Germany	Deutschlandhalle
21 June 1976	Brussels	Belgium	Forest National
22 June 1976	Brussels	Belgium	Forest National
23 June 1976	Paris	France	Pavillon de Paris
24 June 1976	Lyon	France	Palais des Sports de Gerland
26 June 1976	Bern	Switzerland	Festhalle Bern
27 June 1976	Munich	West Germany	Olympiahalle
28 June 1976	Bern	Switzerland	Festhalle Bern
29 June 1976	Hamburg	West Germany	Congresshalle
30 June 1976	Gothenburg	Sweden	Scandinavium
1 July 1976	Copenhagen	Denmark	Idrætsparken
2 July 1976	Düsseldorf	West Germany	Philipshalle
3 July 1976	Sankt Goarshausen	West Germany	Freilichtbühne Loreley
4 July 1976	Eppelheim	West Germany	Rhein-Neckar-Halle
8 July 1976	Glasgow	Scotland	Apollo Theatre
9 July 1976	Glasgow	Scotland	Apollo Theatre
10 July 1976	Stafford	England	Bingley Hall
11 July 1976	Stafford	England	Bingley Hall

== Box office score data ==
List of box office score data with date, city, venue, attendance, gross, references
Date (1976)	City	Venue	Attendance	Gross	Ref(s)
8 April	New York City, United States	Beacon Theatre	7,941 / 7,941	$55,000	
9 April (2 shows)	New York City, United States	Beacon Theatre	7,941 / 7,941	$55,000	

== Personnel ==
Genesis

- Phil Collins – vocals, percussion, drums
- Tony Banks – Hammond T-102 organ, Mellotron M-400, RMI 368x Electra Piano and Harpsichord; ARP Pro Soloist synthesizer, 12-string guitar, backing vocals
- Steve Hackett – electric and 12-string guitars
- Mike Rutherford – bass, Moog Taurus bass pedals, 12-string & electric guitars, backing vocals

Additional musician

- Bill Bruford – drums, percussion
