= Selling England by the Pound =

- Cover painting by Betty Swanwick

Studio album by Genesis
- Released: 5 October 1973
- Recorded: August 1973
- Studio: Island (London)
- Genre: Progressive rock
- Length: 53:48
- Labels: Charisma; Atlantic
- Producers: John Burns; Genesis

Genesis chronology
Genesis Live (1973)	Selling England by the Pound (1973)	The Lamb Lies Down on Broadway (1974)

Singles from Selling England by the Pound
- 1. "I Know What I Like (In Your Wardrobe)" Released: February 1974

Selling England by the Pound is the fifth studio album by the English progressive rock band Genesis, released on 5 October 1973, by Charisma Records. The album was a commercial success in the United Kingdom, reaching No. 3 on the UK Albums Chart, but less so in the United States, peaking at No. 70 on the Billboard 200. A single from the album, "I Know What I Like (In Your Wardrobe)", was released in February 1974 and became the band's first top 30 hit on the UK singles chart.

The album was recorded in August 1973 following the tour supporting their previous album, Foxtrot (1972). The group set aside a short period of time to write new material. It covered a number of themes including the loss of English folk culture and an increased American influence, which was reflected in the title. Following the album's release, the group set out on tour, where they drew an enthusiastic reception from fans.

Critics and the band members themselves have given mixed opinions of the album. Its reputation has improved over time, appearing on various critical and fan-voted lists of the best progressive rock albums. The album has continued to sell and received Gold certifications from the British Phonographic Industry (BPI) and the Recording Industry Association of America (RIAA). It was remastered for CD in 1994 and 2007.

== Background ==
In May 1973, the Genesis line-up of frontman and singer Peter Gabriel, keyboardist Tony Banks, bassist and guitarist Mike Rutherford, guitarist Steve Hackett and drummer Phil Collins completed their 1972–1973 tour supporting their previous album Foxtrot (1972). The tour marked the band's first full-scale North American tour, which drew positive responses, but journalists were still criticising the band and comparing them to other progressive rock bands of the time such as Emerson, Lake & Palmer, Jethro Tull, and Pink Floyd. Charisma pushed to release new Genesis material to capitalise on the band's newfound commercial success despite the band's wishes against it, and released a compilation of live recordings from early 1973, originally intended for broadcast on the King Biscuit Flower Hour radio show in the US, as their first live album Genesis Live (1973). This budget-priced release also compensated for the cancellation of a proposed gig at Wembley Arena in May 1973 due to the inability to print tickets in time, and to act as a bridging album in between Foxtrot and the next studio album. It became their highest-charting album in the UK at the time, peaking at No 9.

The group were too busy touring to write new material, so after coming off the road they set aside time to create new songs. Due to the success of Foxtrot, the group's record label, Charisma Records, allowed them two to three months to come up with a new studio album, which Rutherford considered to be "the kiss of death". Early into the sessions Collins formed a pick-up band with former Yes guitarist Peter Banks for a few gigs, and Rutherford revealed in an interview to Sounds in 1976 that "there had been worries that Phil might want to leave the group". Despite this, Gabriel recalled this time as a "relatively happy and calm period".

== Writing and recording ==
Rehearsal sessions for the album took place at a doctor's house in Chessington and the Una Billings School of Dance in Shepherd's Bush, the same two places where Foxtrot was rehearsed. Banks recalled the group had some difficulty coming up with musical ideas. The Chessington sessions took place in what reporter Jerry Gilbert described as "a rambling old stately home". The group practised in the living room, causing the neighbours to complain about the noise and impose a curfew. Hackett said of the setting, "Because it was a house that belonged to a family, it gave the music a sense of happy amateurishness. It made it fun because you felt you shouldn't really be there doing that kind of thing. It was designed as a canteen or a cafeteria; there was even a machine that used to dispense bubble gum for kids!" The Chessington sessions were where most of the album was written. Collins had been listening to the jazz fusion group Mahavishnu Orchestra, which influenced him to play more complicated time signatures on the drums for "Dancing With the Moonlit Knight" and other parts on the album.

Rehearsals then moved to London in a space beneath the Una Billings School of Dance, during which "I Know What I Like (In Your Wardrobe)" was written. Hackett had not contributed a great deal of material to the group during this time, since he found it hard to write due to the breakdown of his first marriage. Rather than pitch whole songs he instead devised guitar licks, which he believed gave the album a jazz fusion feel.

A simple guitar riff that Hackett had been playing on stage that the band liked and wanted to develop further became "I Know What I Like (In Your Wardrobe)", and three bits from Banks that he intended for different songs were pressed into a single work, "Firth of Fifth", by the other members of the band. A riff developed early on became the opening of "The Battle of Epping Forest". The band repeatedly performed these three pieces daily for a short while which Banks thought resulted in "The Battle of Epping Forest" being too overworked.

One of the ideas that Gabriel wanted to convey with the album was the idea of looking at "Englishness in a different way". This included his suggestion of the album's title, itself a slogan adopted by the Labour Party manifesto, to ensure that the British press would not accuse the band of "selling out" to America. Rutherford later deemed the title to be among the band's best album titles. It represented a decay of English folk culture and an increase in Americanisation. Banks said the English theme across the album was not an intentional idea at first, but merely the way the songs naturally developed. Gabriel later said he wrote all his lyrical contributions to the album in two days.

Having rehearsed and written enough material for an album, the group entered Island Studios in London in August 1973. The engineer of Foxtrot, John Burns, became co-producer. Burns' technical skills resulted in a good recorded sound and environment, and this motivated the group to play better and tackle more complex arrangements. Gabriel was conscious of the greater use of lengthy instrumental sections on the album which he thought presented the risk of the material becoming boring. Genesis had expanded their equipment with an Echoplex and an ARP Pro Soloist, expanding the range of sounds available to them.

== Songs ==
=== Side one ===
Firth of Fifth
Tony Banks wrote most of "Firth of Fifth", which included a guitar solo from Steve Hackett.

"Dancing with the Moonlit Knight" evolved from a number of short piano pieces composed by Gabriel, which was combined with some of Hackett's guitar figures. The a cappella opening was influenced by Scottish plainsong. The second section and outro section consist of improvisations from the whole band, with the exception of the 12-string guitar melody played by Rutherford in the outro, which was composed. Gabriel added English-themed lyrics to counter the impression from the music press that Genesis were trying too hard to appeal to the American audience, including references to Green Shield Stamps. Banks had upgraded to a new model of Mellotron and used the choir sound on the track. The track was originally supposed to segue into "The Cinema Show" to make a piece around 20 minutes in length, but this idea was dropped as the result was too comparable to the 23-minute "Supper's Ready" on Foxtrot. The working title for the outro section was "Disney" in reference to prominent American animation producer The Walt Disney Company, because the members of Genesis thought it sounded like a cartoon. Rutherford thought the song's opening provided a good start to the album, but felt less enthusiastic towards it overall, calling it "a bit busy".

"I Know What I Like (In Your Wardrobe)" came out of a jam session by the group around one of Hackett's guitar riffs. He and Collins often played it around the time Foxtrot was recorded; the other three members did not join initially because they said it sounded too much like the Beatles, but became more invested in it by the time of Selling England by the Pound. Banks came up with the vocal melody for the chorus, and Gabriel wrote the lyrics, which were inspired by the painting The Dream which was later adapted into the album's cover. Gilbert described an early listening of the song as "Hints of quaint English romanticism" that, according to Gabriel, was initially intended to have more of a folk-oriented melody. The percussion sounds heard at the beginning are Gabriel playing with a talking drum that Burns had purchased from Nigeria. It was released as a single from the album, which became the first of the group's to chart in the UK.

Banks wrote a piece which included what became the solo piano introduction of "Firth of Fifth" on his own, and presented it to the group for Foxtrot, but it was rejected. He reworked some sections of the song for Selling England by the Pound, where it drew a more positive reception. Banks recalled the difficulty of removing the noise created by the piano pedal in the studio, so he played the passage without it, which he also found difficult. Hackett took a theme which Banks had written for flute and piano and rearranged it as a guitar solo, which dominates the latter part of the track. Banks later deemed the lyrics, which he contributed with assistance from Rutherford, as one of the worst he had worked on. He had aimed to follow "the idea of a river and then I got a bit caught up in the cosmos and I don't quite know where I ended up".

"More Fool Me" is the second of two songs (the first being "For Absent Friends" from Nursery Cryme) to feature Collins on lead vocals before he became the band's lead singer in 1975. Uncharacteristically for the group's output at the time, the song is a tender, romantic ballad. Its music was written by Rutherford, with lyrics by both him and Collins, while sitting on the steps outside the recording studio. It is performed on the album by just the song's two writers, Rutherford playing 12-string acoustic guitar with reverb effect applied and Collins singing, frequently in falsetto range. Gabriel considered the pair's contributions "quite a breakthrough".

=== Side two ===
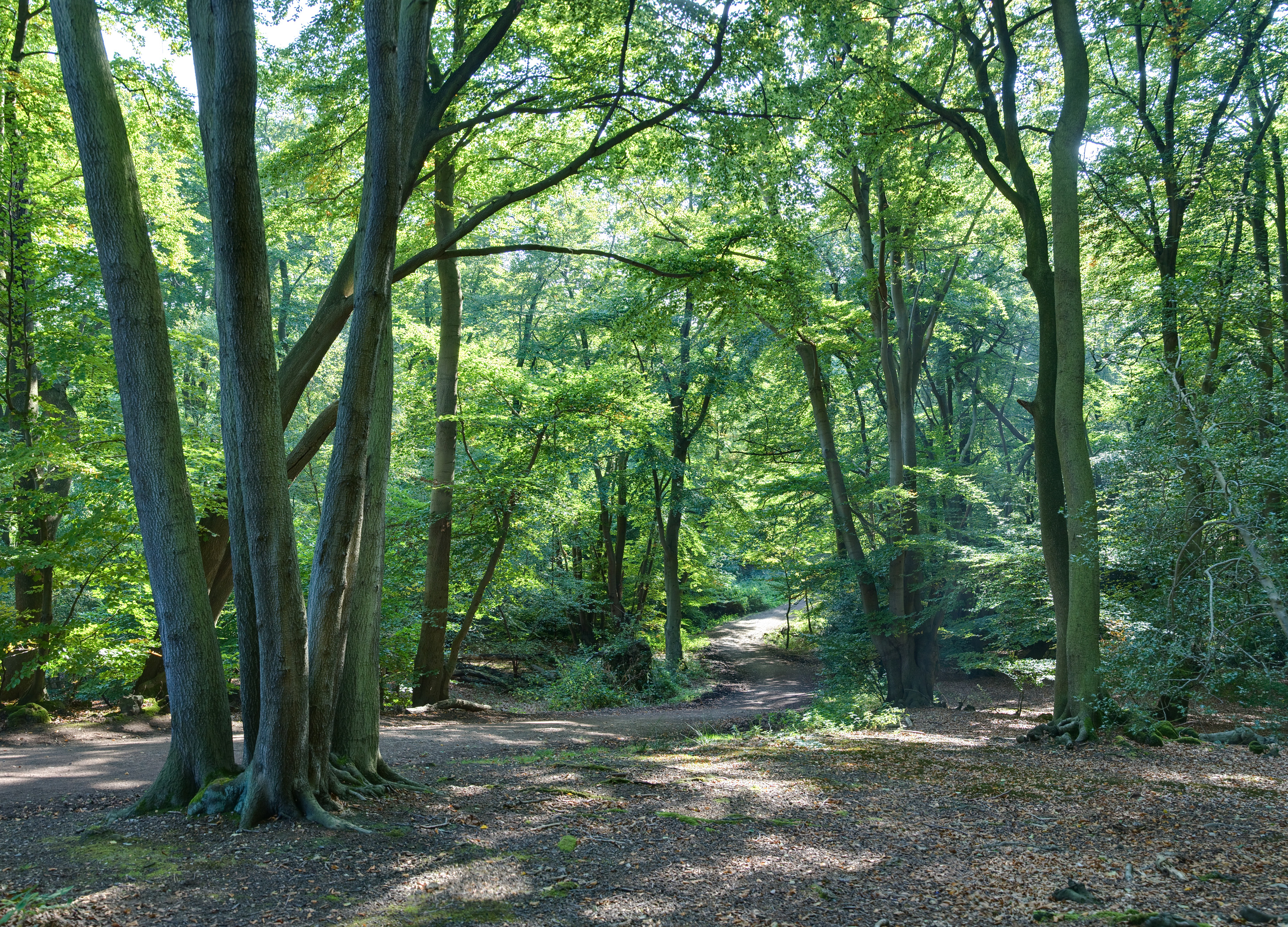
"The Battle of Epping Forest" recounts gang wars that occurred in the titular woods.

"The Battle of Epping Forest" was inspired by a news story that Gabriel had read several years previously about the territorial battles by two rival gangs in the East End of London that would fight in Epping Forest. He placed an advertisement in The Times and looked through library archives in attempt to find more about the story, but was unable to find any further information, so he created his own fictional characters, including "Liquid Len", "Harold Demure" and "The Bethnal Green Butcher". Upon hearing a rehearsal take of the song in July 1973, reporter Chris Welch wrote: "'The 'Battle' has a catchy march theme with typical Genesis drum and bass lines, clean and precise". As with "Get 'Em Out by Friday", Genesis wrote and recorded the entire musical composition as an instrumental before starting on the lyrics, and found that the song seemed overstuffed once the vocals were added. Collins commented, "... there were like 300 words a line. There was no space; it was like all the air had been sucked out of it. I'm not saying that [Peter Gabriel] was in the wrong or we were in the wrong; it's just that if we'd known we could have thinned it out a bit. In those days we didn't go back and re-record things." The lyrics have since been praised for their humour and wit, but the band said they did not gel well with the music and made the piece complicated for the sake of being so. Gabriel thought its ending, which had each gang settling the issue over the toss of a coin, tied up the story well but is too much of an anti-climax.

Though Genesis fans have suggested with varying degrees of seriousness that "After the Ordeal" was titled to reflect its placement after the interminably long and wordy "The Battle of Epping Forest", according to Hackett the title was assigned well before the band decided where to place the song on the album, and was meant to reflect its role as a simple piece which would dispel the tension from the more complex works on the album. The song originated as an electric piece written by Hackett but the band found they could not make it work. Then Banks wrote an additional part for the song which inspired them to change the entire piece to an acoustic arrangement. This was the first Genesis track on which Hackett used a nylon guitar. Rutherford wrote the section where the electric guitar enters. Despite Banks's key role in crafting "After the Ordeal" into a piece most of the band were happy with, both he and Gabriel did not want to include the song on the album, while Hackett argued it should be kept. Banks expressed little interest in its "pseudo classical" style, saying in 2023, "I never liked "After the Ordeal," which was a nice enough piece when Steve wrote it. But I put this pseudo-classical piano on it that I don't like, so I don't listen to it. But even the songs I don't like I usually don't mind hearing, because it takes me back to the time we wrote them." It was ultimately left on after Gabriel and Banks argued about the length of "The Cinema Show", which meant everything was included as a compromise. Banks later said the compromise led to the album overrunning its desirable length on vinyl, resulting in a sound quality he thought came out as "pretty rough".

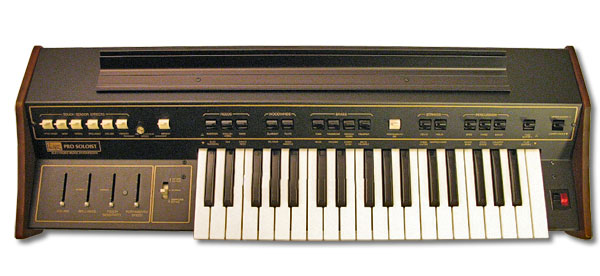
Tony Banks performed the keyboard solo on "The Cinema Show" on an ARP Pro Soloist.

"The Cinema Show" is divided into two sections. The first section is an acoustic piece composed by Rutherford, featuring an instrumental break with vocal harmonies between Gabriel and Collins, 12-string acoustic guitars played by Rutherford and Banks, 6-string electric guitar played by Hackett, flute and oboe played by Gabriel, and drums and wood blocks played by Collins. The second is a four-and-a-half-minute instrumental section written by Banks, Collins, and Rutherford, and consists of a lead on the ARP Pro Soloist (Note: Banks first obtained a Pro Soloist during the album's writing sessions. He had previously borrowed an EMS VCS 3 synthesizer, but disliked it as it kept going out of tune. The Pro Soloist became a regular part of Banks' touring gear with Genesis throughout the 1970s.) and Rutherford and Collins playing a rhythm in a 7/8 time signature. Rutherford came up with the main riff, then Banks and Collins improvised on it. The final melody on the synth was written by Collins. Rutherford remembered playing the part live during a show and briefly thinking "this thing, with the three of us (Banks, Collins, Rutherford), could work, if Peter and Steve were to ever leave, not that I wanted them to leave, or even considered it a possibility at that time, but the thought quickly crossed my mind." For the first section, rather than the standard practice of tuning each pair of strings on the 12-string guitar to the same note, Rutherford had each pair tuned to harmony notes. The lyrics, written by Banks and Rutherford, draw much of their inspiration from the T. S. Eliot poem The Waste Land.

The album closes with a segue from the end of "The Cinema Show" into "Aisle of Plenty", a reprise of "Dancing with the Moonlit Knight" which gives the album a bookend effect. The track uses word play such as "Easy, love there's the safe way home" and "Thankful for her fine fare discount, Tess co-operates", referring to the British supermarkets Fine Fare, Safeway, Tesco and the Co-op.

=== Additional material ===
During the album's sessions Gabriel and Hackett developed a track named "Déja Vu", but it remained unfinished and was left off the album. Hackett prepared a finished version of the song for his album Genesis Revisited (1996). He performed the song live on his 2019 tour which featured Selling England by the Pound performed in its entirety.

== Artwork ==
The album cover is a painting by Betty Swanwick titled The Dream. Swanwick had designed posters for London Transport between the 1930s and 1950s. The original painting did not include a lawn mower; the band had Swanwick add it later as an allusion to the track "I Know What I Like" because Swanwick told them she did not have enough time to paint a new picture for the cover.

== Release ==
Selling England by the Pound was released on 5 October 1973, reaching No. 3 in the UK charts and No. 70 on the U.S. Billboard Pop Albums chart. The album's success in the U.S. benefitted from Charisma Records switching from Buddah Records to Atlantic for distribution. "I Know What I Like (In Your Wardrobe)" was released as a single, with "Twilight Alehouse" on the B-side, in February 1974. It was the band's first single to enter the UK chart, and peaked at No. 21. It was successful enough for Genesis to be invited to perform the song on the British television show Top of the Pops, which the band declined. In 2013, the album was certified Gold by the British Phonographic Industry for selling 100,000 copies.

The album was digitally remastered for compact disc in 1994 and again in 2007 by Rhino Records.

== Critical reception and legacy ==
Retrospective professional reviews
Review scores
Source	Rating
AllMusic	5/5 stars
Christgau's Record Guide	B
Encyclopedia of Popular Music	3/5 stars
The Great Rock Discography	10/10
MusicHound Rock	4/5
Q	4/5 stars
The Rolling Stone Album Guide	2/5 stars

Contemporary reviews for the album were mixed. Rolling Stone's Paul Gambaccini praised the band for attempting something utterly different amidst "a stagnant pop scene", but criticised the album's lyrics, feeling they overused British pop culture references, and complained about some musical passages. Despite this, Gambaccini thought the album "merits some recognition". NME's Barbara Charone said the album was "the band's best, most adventurous album to date". The Guardian's Robin Denselow wrote that "much of the material is indistinctive and tedious". Writing for The Village Voice in June 1974, Robert Christgau assessed the record as "down-to-earth progressive, which means that it indulges in snooty satire about the vulgar futility of working class youth. Would T.S. Eliot be proud? I doubt it. But I have the feeling that they're saying right out what all their co-workers in the genre are thinking, and there's some pretty dense music here."

Retrospective reviews have been more favourable. AllMusic and BBC Music remarked that the album returned to the whimsical eccentricity of Nursery Cryme while retaining the hard rock intensity and pessimism of Foxtrot, combining the best of both elements to make Genesis's best album up to that point. Christgau, later writing in Christgau's Record Guide: Rock Albums of the Seventies (1981), admitted that the songs "Firth of Fifth" and "The Battle of Epping Forest" have "a complexity of tone that's pretty rare in any kind of art", though he summarised the rest of the album by saying "it sounds as snooty as usual".

In 2012, the album ranked seventh in Rolling Stone's "Readers' Poll: Your Favorite Prog Rock Albums of All Time". It was also included in IGN's list "10 Classic Prog Rock Albums" in 2008, which praised its "subtle elegance, sublime textures, and lyrical splendor". Rock author Edward Macan had mixed feelings towards the album, praising "Firth of Fifth" ("one of the finest nine and half minutes of music that Genesis ever put down") and "The Cinema Show" but questioning some of the other material. Motoring journalist and broadcaster Jeremy Clarkson is a fan of the album and wrote sleeve notes for it when it was included in the box set Genesis 1970–1975. In 2023, Sean Murphy of PopMatters called the album "the most satisfying and fully realized Genesis recording," making note of what he called "career-best work" from each individual member of the group.

Hackett has said the album is his favourite Genesis record, and was happy with his extensive contributions to it. In 2017, he explained, "It was an important watershed album for the band, and it was at the beginning of us struggling to find gigs in the States. If we could get into a club somewhere, wherever it was, that was good news for us at that time. A young, struggling band, but with an album that was due to become a classic in time." Banks and Rutherford have had mixed feelings, saying there are a lot of high points but also some lows. Charisma owner Tony Stratton Smith was disappointed with the album, which he thought contained too many instrumental sections. Band friend and former roadie Richard Macphail thought the power of Genesis live had not been captured on record properly until Burns started to work with them and that by the time of Selling England, the group had acquired better equipment. Biographer Robin Platts wrote that "There were enough magic moments and inspired jam sessions to produce such enduring compositions".

Selling England by the Pound has been praised by other songwriters and musicians. Rush drummer Neil Peart has said: "I think Selling England by the Pound is an enduring masterpiece of drumming. Beautiful drumming, lovely sound, and the arrangements, I think they really nailed the best of what that band as an entity could have done with that album." Fish, solo artist and former lead singer of Marillion, has called it "the definitive Genesis album", praised its "emotive" quality, said the wordplay was "one of the things that became quite an influence on me – the games within the lyrics" and concluded it "took a whole jump forward and was the album that really got me into Genesis". Trey Anastasio of the band Phish called the album his all time favorite from Genesis when he inducted the band into the Rock & Roll Hall of Fame in 2010. According to Hackett, John Lennon said he liked the album during a radio interview, which the band took great encouragement from. Swedish guitarist Yngwie Malmsteen also cites the album as a major influence. However, no record of this interview has been found to date. Toto guitarist Steve Lukather called the album a "desert-island record", praising the performances of Gabriel and Collins while calling the guitar playing by Hackett "virtuosic." In an interview, Robert Pollard of Guided by Voices said that "Selling England by the Pound is one of my top 10 records of all time" and that "Genesis with Peter Gabriel might be my biggest influence."

== Tour ==
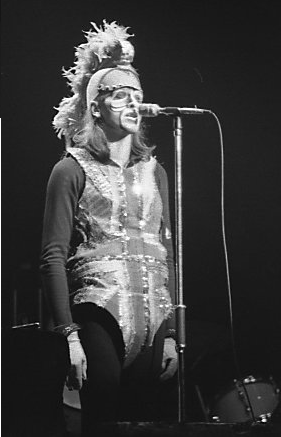
Peter Gabriel during the Selling England by the Pound tour in 1974, dressed in costume

Genesis supported the album with a concert tour of Europe and North America from September 1973 to May 1974. Initially they were to perform with a stage set that included inflatable objects that had images projected onto them, but a change in fire regulations following the Summerland disaster in August 1973 led to the idea being scrapped. Instead, they used a new and more elaborate setup with the performers all dressed in white and white light illuminating the same, while white keyboards, drum kit, and curtains had slides projected onto them. Gabriel devised new stories before songs, and wore a full costume with a helmet and shield representing the Britannia character for "Dancing With the Moonlit Knight" and sang "The Battle of Epping Forest" with a stocking over his head. He also added elements to "The Musical Box", for the first time performing it wearing an old man mask, singing in a stereotypical grumpy old man voice, and repeatedly thrusting his hips at the audience during the ending section.

The setlist was dominated by songs from the new album, with every song except "After the Ordeal" and "Aisle of Plenty" being played. In an unusual twist, "Horizons" from Foxtrot was also often part of the set, despite never having been played during the Foxtrot tour. The rest of the show was usually filled out with the tried-and-true favourites "Watcher of the Skies", "The Musical Box", and "Supper's Ready". This was the first major Genesis tour in which their perennial show closer "The Knife" was not a regular part of the set, though it was on rare occasions used as an encore.

The tour began with a sold-out tour of the UK, but the promoters had to cancel the first date at the Green's Playhouse, Glasgow due to electrical safety issues minutes before its start, with support act Ron Geesin already having finished his set. Genesis realised they were substantially in debt and needed better management, so recruited Tony Smith (no relation to Charisma boss Tony Stratton Smith). In October 1973 a pair of dates in the tour were filmed by Charisma for a possible cinema release, but the plan was rejected by the band who felt the film was not up to standard. Instead, the band performed a five-song set in front of an invited audience at Shepperton Studios that was filmed and broadcast as Tony Stratton Smith Presents Genesis in Concert. The group returned to the U.S. in December 1973 that included six shows in three nights at The Roxy in Los Angeles, and a performance of "Watcher of the Skies" and "The Musical Box" on the late night television show The Midnight Special. However, most of their shows in the U.S. were on the college circuit.

January 1974 saw the band perform five nights at Theatre Royal, Drury Lane which saw Gabriel lifted in the air by steel wires during "Supper's Ready". They then played shows in Belgium, Germany, and Switzerland before doing a well-received tour of Italy, the country where they were then most popular, in February. Following a two-week break, Genesis spent all of March and April touring the United States and Canada, including relatively remote areas like Iowa and Minnesota. During this last leg of the tour, the white colour scheme of their stage setup was replaced with a black scheme.

== Track listing ==
All tracks written by Tony Banks, Phil Collins, Peter Gabriel, Steve Hackett and Mike Rutherford.

Side one
No.	Title	Length
1.	"Dancing with the Moonlit Knight"	8:05
2.	"I Know What I Like (In Your Wardrobe)"	4:08
3.	"Firth of Fifth"	9:38
4.	"More Fool Me"	3:12
Total length:		25:03

Side two
No.	Title	Length
1.	"The Battle of Epping Forest"	11:49
2.	"After the Ordeal"	4:17
3.	"The Cinema Show"	11:06
4.	"Aisle of Plenty" ( (Note: The original vinyl release does not have a track marker between "The Cinema Show" and "Aisle of Plenty", and hence both are shown as a single track.))	1:33
Total length:		28:45

== Personnel ==
Adapted from the album's 1973 sleeve notes.

Genesis

- Peter Gabriel – vocals, flute, oboe, percussion
- Tony Banks – Hammond organ, Mellotron, Hohner Pianet, ARP Pro Soloist, piano, 12-string guitar
- Steve Hackett – electric guitar, nylon guitar
- Mike Rutherford – 12-string guitar, bass, electric sitar, cello
- Phil Collins – drums, assorted percussion, lead vocals on "More Fool Me", backing vocals

Production

- John Burns – producer, engineer
- Genesis – production
- Rhett Davies – assistant engineer
- Betty Swanwick – cover painting

== Charts ==
Chart (1973–74)	Peak position
Australian Albums (Kent Music Report)	52
Finnish Albums (The Official Finnish Charts)	19
Italian Albums (Musica e dischi)	4
UK Albums (Official Charts)	3
US Billboard 200	70

Chart (2014–24)	Peak position
Hungarian Physical Albums (MAHASZ)	8
UK Rock & Metal Albums (Official Charts)	12

== Certifications ==
Region	Certification	Certified units/sales
Canada (Music Canada)	2× Platinum	200,000^{^}
France (SNEP)	Gold	100,000^{*}
Italy (FIMI) 2009 release	Gold	25,000^{‡}
United Kingdom (BPI) original release	Gold	100,000^{^}
United Kingdom (BPI) 2009 release	Gold	100,000^{^}
United States (RIAA)	Gold	500,000^{^}
^{*} Sales figures based on certification alone.^{^} Shipments figures based on certification alone.^{‡} Sales+streaming figures based on certification alone.

== Sources ==
- Awde, Nick (2008). Mellotron: The Machines and the Musicians that Revolutionised Rock. Bennett & Bloom. ISBN 978-1-898948-02-5.
- Bowler, Dave; Dray, Bryan (1992). Genesis: A Biography. Sidgwick & Jackson Ltd. ISBN 978-0-283-06132-5.
- Carruthers, Bob (2011). Genesis - The Gabriel Era - Uncensored on the Record. Coda Books. ISBN 978-1-908538-73-4.
- Easlea, Daryl (2013). Without Frontiers: The Life & Music of Peter Gabriel. Omnibus Press. ISBN 978-0-857-12860-7.
- Graff, Gary; Durchholz, Daniel (1999). MusicHound Rock: The Essential Album Guide. Visible Ink Press. ISBN 978-1-57859-061-2.
- Giammetti, Mario (2020). Genesis 1967 to 1975 - The Peter Gabriel Years. Kingmaker. ISBN 978-1-913218-62-1.
- Hewitt, Alan (2001). Opening the Musical Box – A Genesis Chronicle. Firefly Publishing. ISBN 978-0-946-71930-3.
- Macan, Edward (1997). Rocking the Classics: English Progressive Rock and the Counterculture. Oxford University Press. ISBN 978-0-19-509887-7.
- Platts, Robin (2001). Genesis: Inside & Out (1967–2000). Collector's Guide Publishing. ISBN 978-1-896-52271-5.
- Welch, Chris (2011). Genesis: The Complete Guide to Their Music. Omnibus Press. ISBN 978-0-85712-739-6.

DVD Media

- Banks, Tony; Collins, Phil; Gabriel, Peter; Hackett, Steve; Rutherford, Mike (10 November 2008). Genesis 1970–1975 [Selling England by the Pound] (DVD). Virgin Records. UPC 5099951968328.
