= Century Theatre (Buffalo, New York) =

Coordinates: 42°53′15″N 78°52′25″W

- Shea's Century; New Century Theatre
- Interactive map of Century Theatre
- Address: 511 Main Street; Buffalo, New York; United States

Construction
- Opened: October 1921

The Century Theatre, later known as New Century Theatre, was a 3,076-seat theater located at 511 Main Street in Buffalo, New York. It opened in 1921 as a movie theater and was later used as a rock concert venue in the 1970s. Notable past performers include Cheap Trick, Peter Gabriel, Genesis, Kansas, Starcastle, The Kinks, Rush and Fleetwood Mac.

== History ==
In 1921 the Century Theatre opened as a movie theater.

In 1928 Loew turned over the lease to Micheal Shea who died in 1934. Micheal Shea was succeeded by McFaul, Paramount and Loew then organized a corporate Shea, who didn't renew the lease in 1939 because it wasn't profitable. Nikitas Dipson leased it from 1939 to 1941 who also did not renew due to profitability. It wasn't until Dipson's successor had spent over $50,000 restoring it before it became profitable. It was demolished in the summer of 1980.
