= List of Genesis band members =

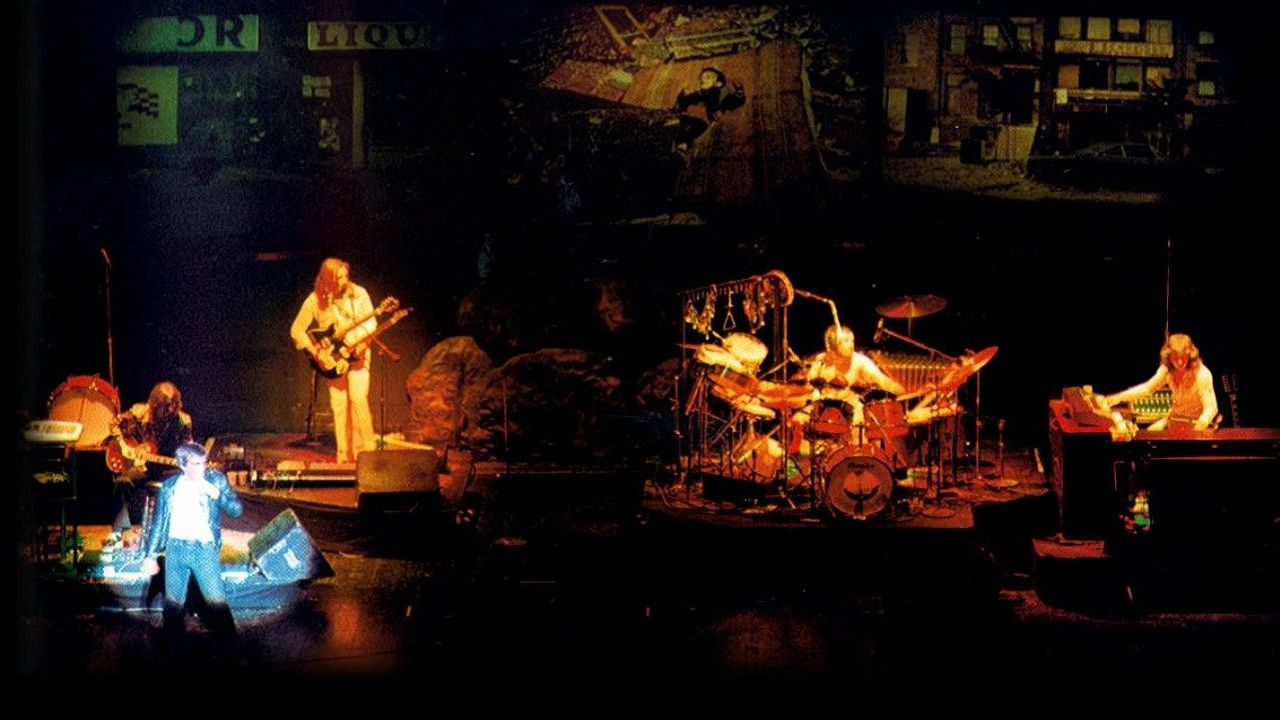
(left to right) Steve Hackett, Peter Gabriel, Mike Rutherford, Phil Collins and Tony Banks

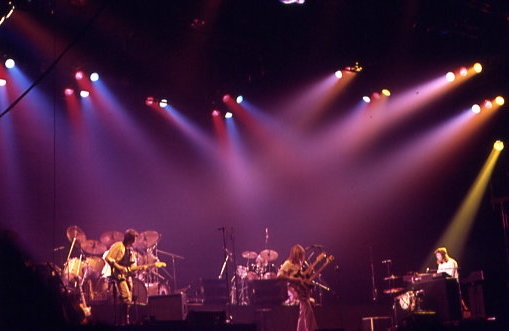
(left to right) Chester Thompson (on drums), Steve Hackett, Phil Collins (also drums), Mike Rutherford and Tony Banks.

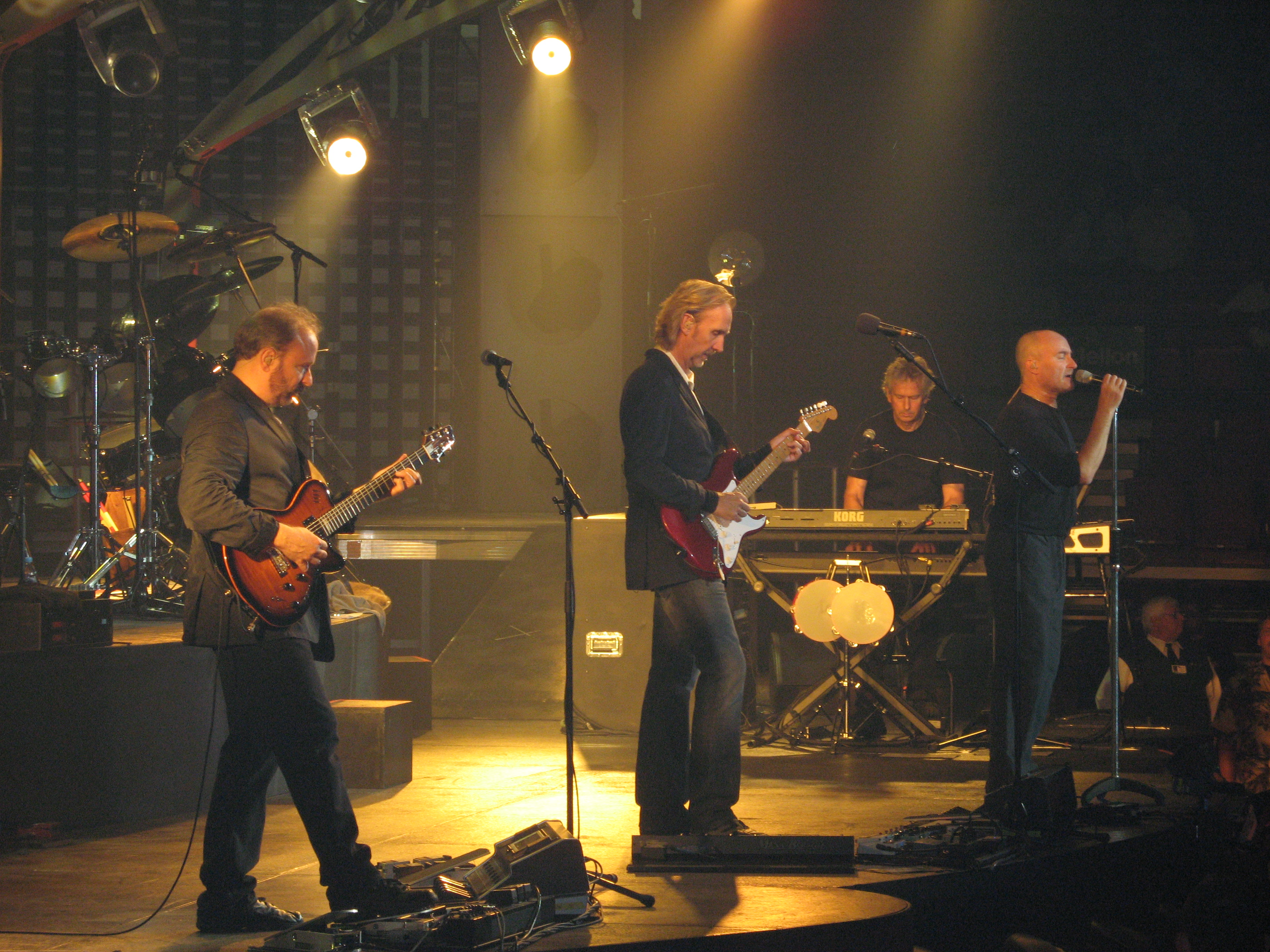
(left to right) Chester Thompson (off left), Daryl Stuermer, Mike Rutherford, Tony Banks and Phil Collins

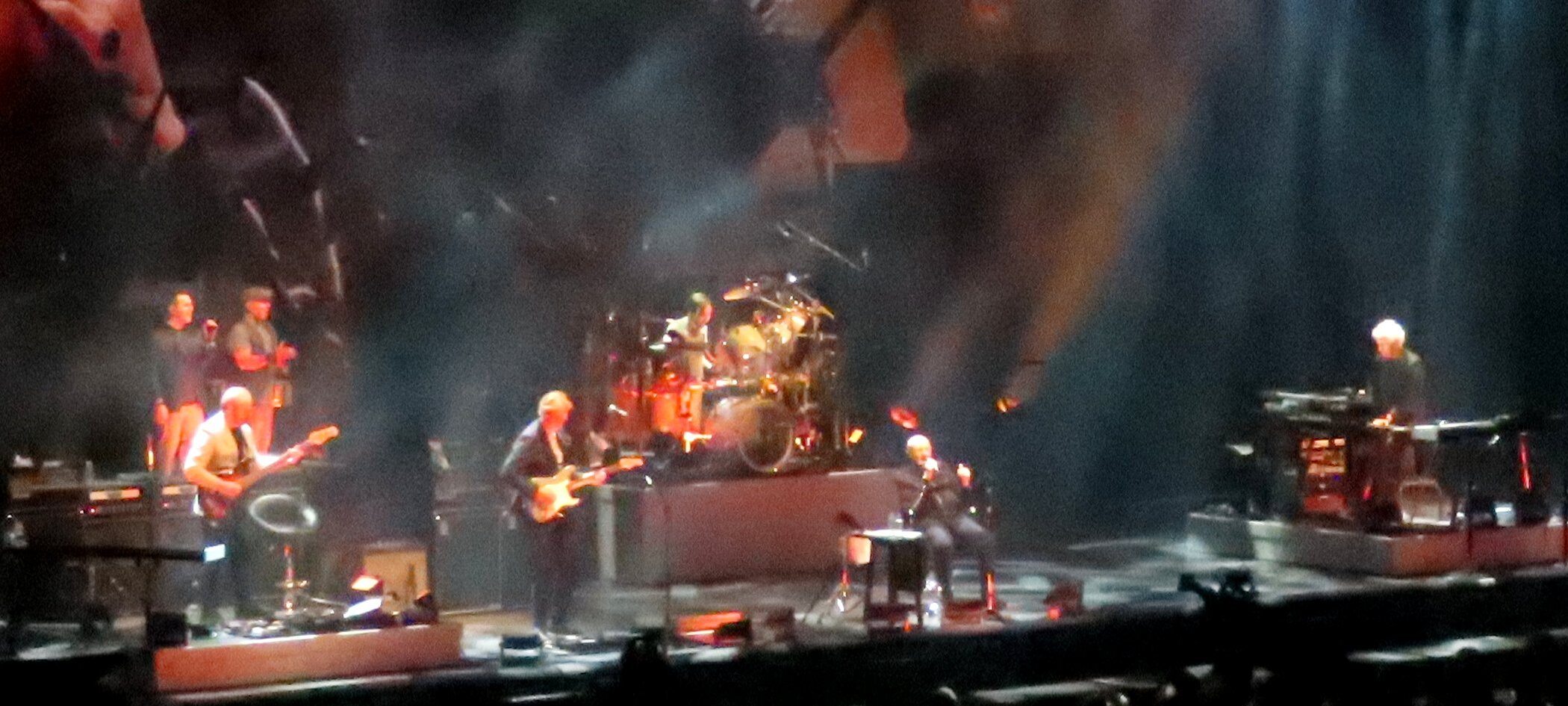
(left to right) Daryl Stuermer, Daniel Pearce, Patrick Smyth, Mike Rutherford, Nic Collins, Phil Collins and Tony Banks

Four line-ups of Genesis in 1975, 1977, 2007 and 2022.

Genesis were an English rock band formed in Godalming, Surrey, in January 1967. The group originally consisted of lead vocalist and flautist Peter Gabriel, guitarist Anthony Phillips, bassist and guitarist Mike Rutherford, keyboardist Tony Banks, and drummer Chris Stewart. In the 1970s, with guitarist Steve Hackett replacing Phillips in the lineup and Phil Collins becoming the drummer, they were among the pioneers of progressive rock. Gabriel and Hackett left in that decade, but the band went on to greater commercial success in the 1980s with a more pop rock and soft rock style. The band's most recent lineup featured constant members Rutherford and Banks, alongside drummer and vocalist Collins, augmented for live shows by touring musicians, bassist and guitarist Daryl Stuermer, drummer Nic Collins, and backing vocalists Daniel Pearce and Patrick Smyth.

== History ==
=== 1967–1971 ===
Following the breakup of earlier groups Garden Wall and Anon, Genesis were formed in January 1967 by Peter Gabriel, Tony Banks, Chris Stewart (all from Garden Wall), Anthony Phillips and Mike Rutherford (both from Anon). The group recorded their first single, "The Silent Sun", in December, which was released the following February. "A Winter's Tale" followed three months later. Shortly after the release of the second single, Stewart had to leave when his parents refused to let him leave school to focus on the band. He was soon replaced by fellow student John Silver.

Over a ten-day period during the school summer holidays in August 1968, Genesis recorded their debut album, From Genesis to Revelation, which was released in March 1969. By August, John Mayhew had replaced Silver, who had moved to the United States to study at Cornell University. Between June and July 1970, the group recorded their second album, Trespass, although before its release Phillips announced that he would be departing due to stage fright and other health issues. The remaining members decided to continue, although without Mayhew who was fired.

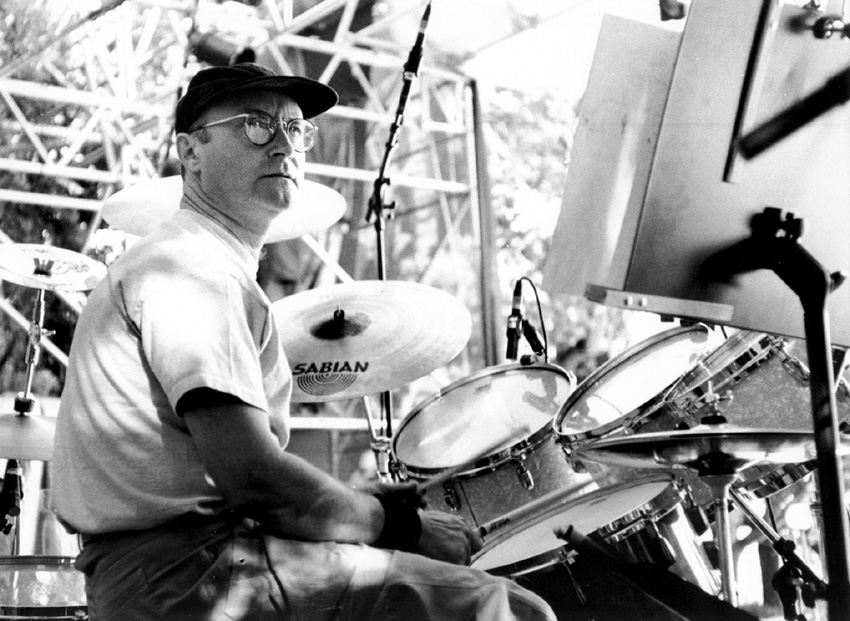
In August 1970, Phil Collins replaced John Mayhew on drums. When frontman Peter Gabriel left in 1975, Collins took over on lead vocals and live drums were handled primarily by touring musicians.

After advertising for the vacant positions in Melody Maker magazine, Genesis hired Phil Collins as Mayhew's replacement in August 1970. Before bringing in a replacement for Phillips, the group performed for a couple of months as a four-piece without a guitarist. The position was eventually filled temporarily by Mick Barnard starting in November. By January 1971, Barnard had been replaced by former Quiet World guitarist Steve Hackett.

=== 1971–1977 ===
The lineup of Peter Gabriel, Steve Hackett, Mike Rutherford, Tony Banks and Phil Collins remained stable for four years, issuing the albums Nursery Cryme in 1971, Foxtrot in 1972, Genesis Live and Selling England by the Pound in 1973, and The Lamb Lies Down on Broadway in 1974. Gabriel left at the end of the Lamb Lies Down on Broadway Tour in May 1975, although his departure was not officially announced until 15 August 1975.

Genesis auditioned several potential replacements for Gabriel and even briefly considered continuing as an instrumental group, before Collins eventually started performing lead vocals for their next album, A Trick of the Tail, and took on the role full-time. To allow him to focus on performing vocals, drums on the Trick of the Tail Tour were performed by Bill Bruford. In December 1976, it was announced that Bruford had been replaced by Chester Thompson. Collins continued to play the drums on all of the band's studio recordings and he continued to play drums in concert for certain songs, including extended instrumental sections, often playing percussion onstage while singing. The band's second live album, Seconds Out, released in late 1977, mostly includes recordings from the 1977 tour with Thompson on drums, the exception being "The Cinema Show", which is from the 1976 tour with Bruford on drums.

Following the Wind & Wuthering Tour, it was announced in October 1977 that Hackett had left Genesis to pursue a solo career. Prior to the announcement, Collins, Rutherford and Banks had already recorded the group's next album, ...And Then There Were Three..., which was issued in March 1978. After Hackett's departure, Daryl Stuermer joined Thompson as a member of the Genesis touring band, performing guitars, bass and backing vocals.

=== 1977–present ===
The Banks/Collins/Rutherford (with Stuermer/Thompson) lineup of Genesis remained constant for almost 20 years, releasing six studio albums and three live albums. The We Can't Dance Tour of 1992 was the final run to feature this setup, as the band took a break thereafter. On 18 September 1993, the trio of Collins, Rutherford and Banks performed at a fundraising event with Tim Renwick on bass, and Gary Wallis and Roger Taylor on drums. Genesis spent the next couple of years on hiatus, before it was announced on 28 March 1996 that Collins had left the band, although Rutherford and Banks assured that they would continue after hiring a new vocalist.

By November 1996, Ray Wilson had been appointed as the replacement for Collins in time for the recording of Calling All Stations, although his addition was not announced until the following June. For the subsequent touring cycle, the new trio were joined by guitarist Anthony Drennan and drummer Nir Zidkyahu. The tour ended in 1998, and by 2000 the group had disbanded.

Six years later, Collins, Rutherford and Banks announced at a press conference in November 2006 that Genesis were reforming for a European tour the following year. The tour, dubbed Turn It On Again, was subsequently expanded to include a North American run of concerts. Alongside the main trio, it also saw the return of touring guitarist/bassist Daryl Stuermer and drummer Chester Thompson. The 2007 concert tour spawned the live album Live over Europe 2007 and the live DVD When in Rome 2007. Turn It On Again: The Tour ended with a show in Hollywood, California on 13 October 2007.

A second reformation, the Last Domino? Tour, was announced on 4 March 2020, 13 years after the previous tour. Stuermer returned, alongside Collins's son Nic on drums. The band have since ended due to Collins' bad health.

== Members ==
=== Final lineup ===
Image	Name	Years active	Instruments	Release contributions
	Tony Banks	1967–2000; 2006–2007; 2020–2022	keyboards; acoustic guitar; backing vocals	all releases
	Mike Rutherford	1967–2000; 2006–2007; 2020–2022	bass; electric and acoustic guitars; bass pedals; cello (until 1972); backing vocals	all releases
	Phil Collins	1970–1996; 2000; 2006–2007; 2020–2022	drums; percussion; drum machine; lead and backing vocals	all releases from Nursery Cryme (1971) onwards, except Calling All Stations (1997)

=== Former members ===
Image	Name	Years active	Instruments	Release contributions
	Peter Gabriel	1967–1975; 1982 (one off)	lead vocals; flute; oboe; percussion	all releases from "The Silent Sun" (1968) to The Lamb Lies Down on Broadway (1974)
	Anthony Phillips	1967–1970	electric and acoustic guitars; dulcimer; backing vocals	"The Silent Sun" (1968); "A Winter's Tale" (1968); From Genesis to Revelation (1969); Trespass (1970)
	Chris Stewart	1967–1968	drums; percussion	"The Silent Sun" (1968); "A Winter's Tale" (1968); From Genesis to Revelation (1969) – one track only
	John Silver	1968–1969	drums; percussion	From Genesis to Revelation (1969)
	John Mayhew	1969–1970 (died 2009)	drums; percussion; backing vocals	Trespass (1970)
	Mick Barnard	1970–1971	electric and acoustic guitars	none – live performances only
	Steve Hackett	1971–1977; 1982 (one off)	electric and acoustic guitars	all releases from Nursery Cryme (1971) to Seconds Out (1977); Three Sides Live (1982) – one track only
	Ray Wilson	1996–2000	lead vocals	Calling All Stations (1997)

=== Touring ===
Image	Name	Years active	Instruments	Release contributions
	Ronnie Caryl	1971 (one off) (died 2023)	guitars	none – one live performance only
	Bill Bruford	1976	drums; percussion	In Concert (1977); Seconds Out (1977) – one track only; Three Sides Live (1982) – one track only
	Chester Thompson	1976–1992; 2007	drums; percussion	all live releases from Seconds Out (1977) onwards
	Daryl Stuermer	1978–1992; 2000; 2007; 2021–2022	bass; guitars; backing vocals	all live releases from Three Sides Live (1982) onwards
	Tim Renwick	1993 (one-off)	bass; guitars; backing vocals	none – one live performance only
	Gary Wallis	1993 (one-off)	drums; percussion	none – one live performance only
	Roger Taylor	1993 (one-off)	drums; percussion	none – one live performance only
	Nir Zidkyahu	1997–1998	drums; percussion	Calling All Stations (1997)
	Anthony Drennan	1997–1998	bass; guitars; backing vocals	none – live performances only
	Nic Collins	2021–2022	drums; percussion	none – live performances only
	Daniel Pearce	2021–2022	backing vocals	none – live performances only
	Patrick Smyth	2021–2022	backing vocals	none – live performances only

== Lineups ==
Period	Members	Releases
January 1967 – June 1968	Tony Banks – keyboards, backing vocals; Mike Rutherford – bass, guitar, backing vocals; Peter Gabriel – lead vocals, flute, oboe, percussion; Anthony Phillips – guitar, dulcimer, backing vocals; Chris Stewart – drums, percussion	"The Silent Sun" (1968); "A Winter's Tale" (1968); From Genesis to Revelation (1969) – 1 track; Genesis Archive 1967–75 (1998) – 9 tracks
June 1968 – August 1969	Tony Banks – keyboards, backing vocals; Mike Rutherford – bass, guitar, backing vocals; Peter Gabriel – lead vocals, flute, oboe, percussion; Anthony Phillips – guitar, dulcimer, backing vocals; John Silver – drums, percussion	From Genesis to Revelation (1969) – remaining tracks; Genesis Archive 1967–75 (1998) – 6 tracks
August 1969 – August 1970	Tony Banks – keyboards, guitar, backing vocals; Mike Rutherford – bass, guitar, backing vocals; Peter Gabriel – lead vocals, flute, oboe, percussion; Anthony Phillips – guitar, dulcimer, backing vocals; John Mayhew – drums, percussion, backing vocals	Trespass (1970); Genesis Archive 1967–75 (1998) – 5 tracks
August – November 1970	Tony Banks – keyboards, guitar, backing vocals; Mike Rutherford – guitar, bass, backing vocals; Peter Gabriel – lead vocals, flute, oboe, percussion; Phil Collins – drums, percussion, backing vocals	none
November 1970 – January 1971	Tony Banks – keyboards, guitar, backing vocals; Mike Rutherford – bass, guitar, backing vocals; Peter Gabriel – lead vocals, flute, oboe, percussion; Phil Collins – drums, percussion, backing and lead vocals; Mick Barnard – guitar	none
January 1971 – August 1975 (temporary reunions for one-off show in October 1982 and in studio during 1999)	Tony Banks – keyboards, guitar, backing vocals; Mike Rutherford – bass, guitar, backing vocals; Peter Gabriel – lead vocals, flute, oboe, percussion; Phil Collins – drums, percussion, backing and lead vocals; Steve Hackett – guitar, kalimba, autoharp	Nursery Cryme (1971); "Happy the Man" (1972); Foxtrot (1972); Genesis Live (1973); Selling England by the Pound (1973); The Lamb Lies Down on Broadway (1974); Genesis Archive 1967–75 (1998) – 32 tracks; Turn It On Again: The Hits (1999) – 1 new track "The Carpet Crawlers 1999"
August 1975 – October 1977	Tony Banks – keyboards, guitar, backing vocals; Mike Rutherford – bass, guitar, backing vocals; Phil Collins – lead vocals, drums, percussion; Steve Hackett – guitar, kalimba, autoharp; with: Bill Bruford – drums, percussion (touring until July 1976); Chester Thompson – drums, percussion (touring after Bruford)	A Trick of the Tail (1976); Wind & Wuthering (1976); In Concert (1977 film) – with Bruford; Spot the Pigeon (1977); Seconds Out (1977) – 1 track with Bruford, remaining tracks with Thompson; Three Sides Live (1982) – 1 track with Bruford; Genesis Archive #2 1976–92 (2000) – 4 tracks including 1 with Bruford
October 1977 – March 1996	Tony Banks – keyboards, guitar, backing vocals; Mike Rutherford – guitar, bass, backing vocals; Phil Collins – lead vocals, drums, percussion; with: Chester Thompson – drums, percussion (touring until November 1992); Daryl Stuermer – bass, guitar, backing vocals (touring until November 1992); Tim Renwick – bass, guitar (one-off show in September 1993); Roger Taylor – drums (one-off show in September 1993); Gary Wallis – drums (one-off show in September 1993)	...And Then There Were Three... (1978); Duke (1980); Abacab (1981); 3×3 (1982); Three Sides Live (1982) – remaining tracks with Thompson and Stuermer; Three Sides Live (1982 film) – with Thompson and Stuermer; Genesis (1983); The Mama Tour (1984 film) – with Thompson and Stuermer; Invisible Touch (1986); Invisible Touch Tour (1988 film) – with Thompson and Stuermer; Knebworth '90 (1990 film) – with Thompson and Stuermer; We Can't Dance (1991); The Way We Walk Volume One: The Shorts (1992) – with Thompson and Stuermer; The Way We Walk Volume Two: The Longs (1993) – with Thompson and Stuermer; The Way We Walk (1993 film) – with Thompson and Stuermer; Genesis Archive #2 1976–92 (2000) – 30 tracks including 12 with Thompson and Stuermer
March 1996 – September 2000	Tony Banks – keyboards, guitar, backing vocals; Mike Rutherford – guitar, bass, backing vocals; Ray Wilson – lead vocals; with: Nir Zidkyahu – drums, percussion (session/touring); Nick D'Virgilio – drums (session); Anthony Drennan – bass, guitar, backing vocals (touring)	Calling All Stations (1997) – with Zidkyahu and D'Virgilio
September – December 2000 (one-off "acoustic" show in September and live "acoustic" performances filmed in studio for documentary)	Tony Banks – keyboards; Mike Rutherford – guitar; Phil Collins – lead vocals, percussion; with: Daryl Stuermer – guitar (one-off show)	The Genesis Songbook (2001 film) – documentary with live in studio performances
Band inactive 2001 – November 2006
November 2006 – October 2007	Tony Banks – keyboards, backing vocals; Mike Rutherford – guitar, bass, backing vocals; Phil Collins – lead vocals, drums, percussion; with: Daryl Stuermer – bass, guitar, backing vocals (touring); Chester Thompson – drums, percussion (touring)	Live over Europe 2007 (2007) – with Stuermer and Thompson; When in Rome 2007 (2008 film) – with Stuermer and Thompson
Band inactive October 2007 – March 2020
March 2020 – March 2022	Tony Banks – keyboards; Mike Rutherford – guitar, bass, backing vocals; Phil Collins – lead vocals; with: Daryl Stuermer – bass, guitar (touring); Nic Collins – drums, percussion (touring); Daniel Pearce – backing vocals (touring); Patrick Smyth – backing vocals (touring)	none
