= From Genesis to Revelation =

Studio album by Genesis
- Released: 28 March 1969
- Recorded: December 1967 ("Silent Sun"); August 1968
- Studios: Regent Sound Studios, Soho, London
- Genres: Psychedelic pop; folk; art rock; orchestral pop; psychedelic folk
- Length: 43:25
- Label: Decca
- Producer: Jonathan King

Genesis chronology
| From Genesis to Revelation (1969) | Trespass (1970) |

Singles from From Genesis to Revelation
- 1. "The Silent Sun" Released: 2 February 1968; 2. "A Winter's Tale" Released: 10 May 1968; 3. "Where the Sour Turns to Sweet" Released: 27 June 1969

From Genesis to Revelation is the debut studio album by the English rock band Genesis, released on 28 March 1969 on Decca Records. The album originated from a collection of demos recorded in 1967 while the members of Genesis were pupils of Charterhouse in Godalming, Surrey. The band gave the demos to Jonathan King who named the group, organised deals with his publishing company Jonjo Music and Decca, and got them studio time at Regent Sound Studios to record a series of singles and a full album. A string section arranged and conducted by Arthur Greenslade was added later on some songs. By the time Genesis had finished recording, John Silver had replaced original drummer Chris Stewart.

The album and its singles were a commercial flop, and received a mixed to negative reaction from critics. By mid-1969, the group had severed ties with King and resumed education until they reformed and turned Genesis into a full-time band. The album was preceded by two singles; "The Silent Sun" (later becoming part of the album) and "A Winter's Tale" were released in 1968, followed by album track "Where the Sour Turns to Sweet" in 1969. In October 1974, after the group had grown in popularity, it peaked at No. 170 on the Billboard 200 in the US.

Until the 2020s, King retained the rights to the album and supervised multiple reissues of the album, some with bonus tracks. On October 9, 2026, the album was reissued by Cherry Red Records with new mono, stereo, Dolby Atmos and 5.1 surround sound mixes by Stephen W. Tayler with previously unreleased bonus material.

== Background ==
The founding line-up of Genesis consisted of guitarist Anthony Phillips, bassist Mike Rutherford, lead vocalist Peter Gabriel, keyboardist Tony Banks, and drummer Chris Stewart, all pupils of Charterhouse School in Godalming, Surrey. The five had played in the school's two active bands; Rutherford and Phillips were in Anon while Gabriel, Banks, and Stewart made up Garden Wall. During the Christmas holidays of 1966, after both groups had split, Phillips and Rutherford wrote some songs together at Rutherford's grandmother's house and asked Banks to play piano on a demo they were planning to record. Banks agreed under the condition that they also record a song he and Gabriel had written, "She Is Beautiful". During the Easter school holiday they entered a primitive recording studio run by Brian Roberts in Chiswick to record the material. Some sources claim all five members of what became Genesis were present, while others say Stewart was not involved at this point and that the drums on the demo were played by Gabriel. They assembled a tape of six songs originally intended for someone else to perform as the group saw themselves foremost as a collection of songwriters. This included five songs from Phillips and Rutherford: "Don't Want You Back", "Try a Little Sadness", "That's Me", "Listen on Five", and "Patricia", an instrumental, plus one from Gabriel and Banks, "She Is Beautiful". "Patricia" was later reworked into "In Hiding" and "She Is Beautiful" was later known as "The Serpent". Banks described the material as "straight pop music" as it was the direction the band wanted to explore. At this point, the group were known as The New Anon.

The group sent the demo tape to two people, one being BBC radio presenter David Jacobs. The second was sent to former Charterhouse pupil Jonathan King who had scored commercial success as a singer-songwriter and producer with his UK top five single "Everyone's Gone to the Moon" in 1965, and therefore seemed a natural choice. King visited the school during Old Boys Day, so the group had a friend give the tape to him. He listened to the tape in his car on his drive home and, despite its roughness, was immediately enthusiastic, particularly about Gabriel's vocals.

== Recording and production ==
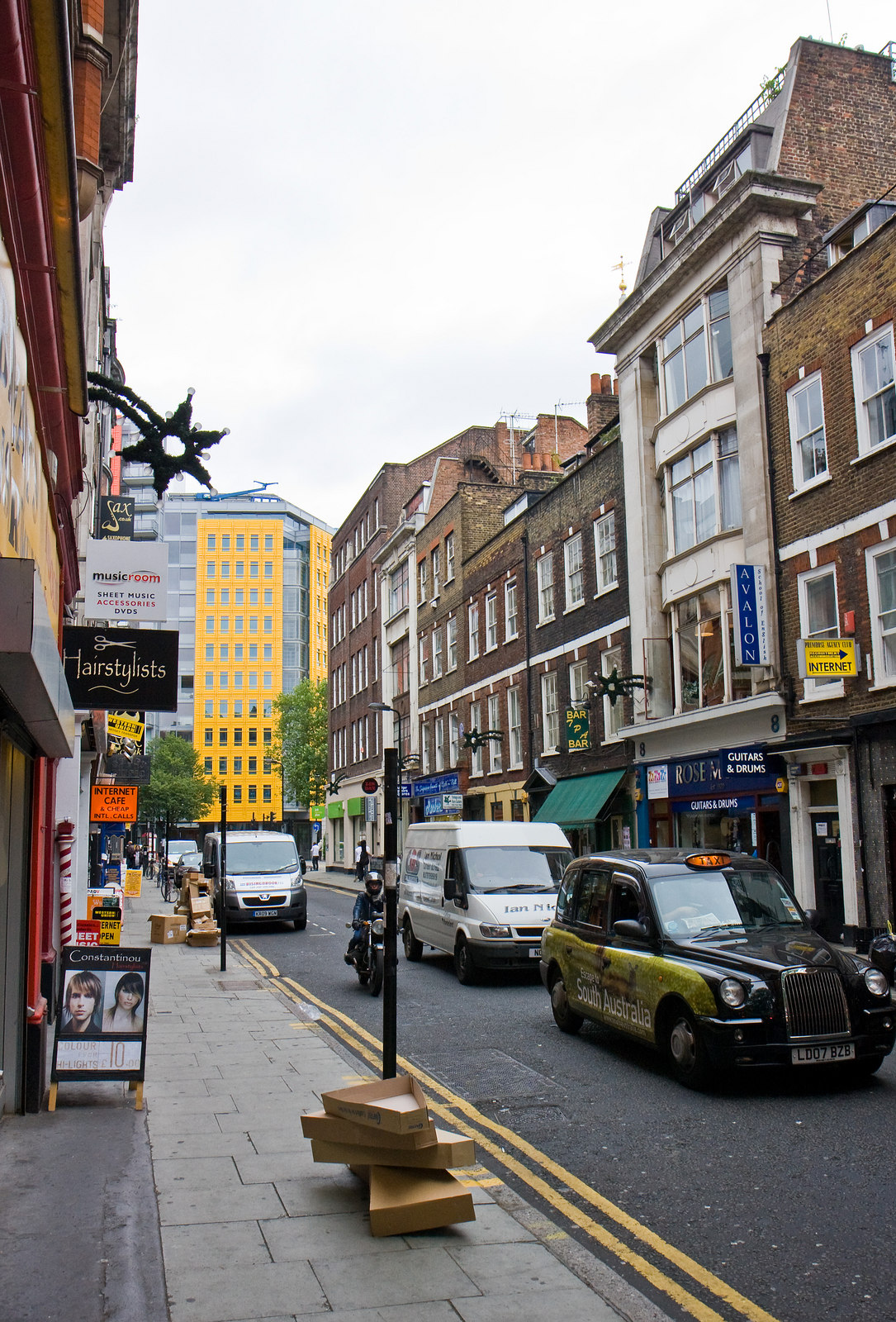
Denmark Street in 2010

King offered his support to the band and paid them £40 to record four songs. He pressed for more simple arrangements, but maintained that his suggestion for the group to avoid playing electric instruments was because acoustic instruments were cheaper, rather than his personal taste. These early sessions took place between August and December 1967 at Regent Sound Studios on Denmark Street, London, with the intent on releasing them as singles. The four tracks put down were new arrangements of "She's Beautiful" and "Try a Little Sadness", with "Where the Sour Turns to Sweet" and "The Image Blown Out", the latter ultimately rejected from the album. King was happy with the results enough to sign them, offering a ten-year deal with his publishing company Jonjo Music with a five-year option and 2% of the royalties, and a five-year recording deal with Decca Records with an optional second year. However, the group's parents expressed concern as they were aged between 15 and 17 at the time and preferred their children to pursue careers away from music. Upon their intervention, family solicitors took charge and arranged for a new, one-year deal with an optional second.

King noticed the band's tendency to expand and complicate their arrangements, which he disliked and suggested they stick to straightforward pop songs. This culminated in King either trimming Banks's solo spots or removing them entirely, much to his annoyance. King later explained that because Genesis were still learning to play their instruments, he felt that they were not ready to take on longer works yet. In response, Gabriel and Banks wrote "The Silent Sun" as a pastiche of the Bee Gees, one of King's favourite bands, though King later claimed the Bee Gees pastiche description was inaccurate. The song was recorded at Regent Sound studio A in December 1967, with a section arranged and conducted by Arthur Greenslade added later in production. It was released on 2 February 1968 with "That's Me" on the B-side as the first Genesis single. King came up with the group's name, thinking it marked the beginning of a "new sound and a new feeling", and that it was the true start of his career as a producer. Other names included King's suggestion of Gabriel's Angels and Phillips's idea, Champagne Meadow. In May 1968, the second single, "A Winter's Tale" backed with "One-Eyed Hound", was released and, like their first, flopped. Stewart then left the group to continue with his studies. Stewart later revealed that he had in fact been fired by King because his drumming skills were inadequate. He recalled, "In the end, of course, I was really upset. You start dreaming of becoming a rock star and then, all of a sudden, it's gone... That said, I wasn't upset for long because they gave me 300 pounds [equivalent to £4,588 in 2025], which at that time was a massive amount of money."

Despite their lack of success King continued to support the group and, by mid-1968, suggested that a studio album might reverse their fortunes. The group were a little overwhelmed in working with a greater amount of available time on an LP, so King suggested the idea of a loose concept album that told a story about the Book of Genesis at the start and the Book of Revelation at the end, with linked instrumental tracks. The idea worked, and the group began to write at a faster pace. They would in fact end up with a surfeit of material; songs which were intended for the album but left off due to lack of space include "The Magic of Time", "Build Me a Mountain", and "Visions of Angels". The band recruited John Silver to play drums, and wrote and rehearsed their new material at his parents' country home in Oxford and the parents of school friend David Thomas.

Though the album credits all the songs as written by the entire group, and BMI records credits all the songs as written by all four founding members, at this point they were still writing primarily with their pre-Genesis songwriting partnerships of Banks-Gabriel and Phillips-Rutherford, with little collaboration between the two pairs. In addition, many of the unlisted instrumental tunes which appear throughout the album were not written by Genesis at all. For example, the piano piece preceding "Fireside Song" is a cover of a choral hymn written by Herbert Howells. Songs which were primarily or wholly written by Banks-Gabriel include "The Serpent", "The Conqueror", "In Limbo", and "The Silent Sun", while songs which were primarily or wholly written by Phillips-Rutherford include "In the Wilderness". "Window" is a rare example of significant collaboration between the pairs; the music was composed on the roof of Thomas's house by Phillips and Rutherford, and the lyrics were written by Gabriel.

In August 1968, during the school summer holidays, the band returned to Regent Sound studio 2 to record From Genesis to Revelation. The music was recorded in three days, and the album was put together in ten. King was the producer, and brought in Brian Roberts and former Charterhouse pupil Tom Allom as recording engineers. The sessions involved two four-track recording machines, and marked Banks's first time playing an organ. The material put down, Greenslade and Lew Warburton then added more string and horn arrangements to one stereo channel while mixing the band's performance on the other. This was done without the band's knowledge, which they thought compromised the strength of the songs. Phillips was particularly angered at the decision and was the only member to express his feelings towards it by stomping out of the studio on the last day. In a 2011 interview he said that in retrospect he understood why King thought the recordings needed the extra instrumentation, and explained that the problem was that due to the limitations of recording technology of the time, adding orchestration meant that everything else on the recording had to be reduced to mono.

== Release ==
The album was released in March 1969 and failed to chart. "Where the Sour Turns to Sweet" was released as a single on 27 June 1969 in an attempt to stimulate new interest. The album was released in the U.S. in 1974 after the group had grown in popularity, and peaked at No. 170 on the Billboard 200 in October of that year.

Prior to its release, Decca discovered that an American act had also called themselves Genesis and asked the band to change its name to avoid confusion. King reached a compromise so the band's name would be omitted from the sleeve, leaving the album's title written in gold text in a Gothic style in order to evoke mystery when presented in music shops. The American Genesis in question was likely a Los Angeles-based group that released In the Beginning on the Mercury label in 1967. Banks later said that they remained Genesis in the UK and put themselves down as Revelation in the US, giving additional meaning to the album's title. The disc had very poor distribution "and it sank without trace". King later said that Decca was unable to promote the album effectively and get the exposure it needed to succeed, leaving him to carry out much of the work himself which he lacked enough experience in at the time. According to Rutherford:

Legend has it that From Genesis to Revelation ended up being shelved in the religious music section of record shops as a result, but the fact is we only sold 600 copies so it can't have been in many record shops in any case. I can't remember ever seeing it, and I did look.

The album sold 649 copies. Many record shops filed the album in their religious music sections, since the title From Genesis to Revelation was the only descriptive text on the album. Banks later deemed the material as merely poor renditions of their songs, rating "Silent Sun" and "In the Wilderness" as the strongest cuts.

== Reception and legacy ==
Professional ratings
Review scores
| Source | Rating |
|---|---|
| AllMusic | 2/5 stars |
| Classic Rock | 5/10 stars |
| The Rolling Stone Album Guide | 3/5 stars |

When the album failed to become a success, the group decided to split and resume education. This marked the end of their association with King, who had grown increasingly dissatisfied with the band directing their material away from mainstream pop. In addition, Genesis had fulfilled their contractual obligation with Decca with the release of "Where the Sour Turns to Sweet", and neither they nor King were interested in renewing the deal. In September 1969, Gabriel, Banks, Rutherford, and Phillips decided to make Genesis a full-time band and write on their own musical terms which had developed to what Phillips described as "original and dramatic". They replaced Silver with drummer John Mayhew, and toured England for six months. Their residency at Ronnie Scott's club in Soho, London caught the attention of Tony Stratton Smith who signed them to his label, Charisma Records. Genesis began formulating the music that would be recorded on their next album, Trespass.

Noel Gallagher is a fan of the album, saying, "I became obsessed with early Genesis" despite being a frequent critic of the group's later work, particularly the Phil Collins-led era. The track "If Love Is the Law" from his album Who Built the Moon? was written as a pastiche of "The Conqueror".

== Reissues ==
Although King initially had From Genesis to Revelation licensed to Decca Records on a short-term basis, he continues to hold the rights to the album and has re-released it several times under a variety of titles. He chooses to reissue it when there is demand for it, and claimed that Genesis have not attempted to purchase the rights from him. Banks said the group did attempt to purchase the rights but King wanted "vast sums" for it. The album was not included in their Genesis 1970–1975 box set which covers the rest of the band's era with Gabriel.

Some material that was put onto tape during 1967-1969 but remained unreleased was included on 1998 box set Genesis Archive 1967–75. This included tracks on From Genesis to Revelation without the string arrangements. Some of the tapes had been in storage in Phillips's attic, and he initially pleaded with the group not to release them due to what he considered poor guitar work.

In 2000, the album was reissued in a two disc set. The second disc included the four tracks included on And the Word Was....., four early versions of songs on the album, and ten interviews. On 25 October 2010, the album was released as a special edition on iTunes. It includes the bonus tracks from the 2000 reissue.

In October 2026, the album was released as a 4 CD/1 Blu-Ray box set, 2 CD set, and 2 LP set with a bonus EP by Cherry Red Records. The former package includes new mono, stereo, Dolby Atmos and 5.1 surround sound mixes by Stephen W. Tayler, previously unreleased bonus material including demos from 1967 and 1968, and new interviews with Gabriel, Banks, and Rutherford.

| Year | Label | Format | Notes |
|---|---|---|---|
| 1969 | Decca | LP | SKL 4990 (stereo) LK 4990 (mono) |
| 1974 | London | LP | XPS 643 (stereo) |
| 1974 | Decca | LP | Released as In the Beginning, SKL 4990. |
| 1976 | Decca | LP | Released as Rock Roots, ROOTS 1. |
| 1977 | London | LP | Released as In the Beginning, LC 50006. |
| 1986 | Rock Machine | CD | Released as Where the Sour Turns to Sweet, MACD 4. |
| 1987 | London | CD | Released as And the Word Was..., 820 496-2. |
| 1990 | DCC Compact Classics | CD | DZS-051. |
| 1993 | Music Club | CD | Released as From Genesis to Revelation - The First Album, MCCD 133. |
| 1996 | Disky Communications Europe B.V. | CD | Released as From Genesis to Revelation - The Original Album, DC 863092 |
| 2000 | Original Masters | CD | 2xCD, 142952 |
| 2005 | Edsel Records | CD | 2xCD, MEDCD 721 |
| 2007 | Weton-Wesgram | CD | Released as Genesis, 2xCD, DL 1017 |
| 2008 | Varèse Sarabande | CD | 30206689525. |
| 2017 | Jonjo Music | Digital | Released as Genesis: 50 Years Ago, featuring previously unreleased multitrack recordings. |
| 2026 | Cherry Red Records | 5 CD + 1 Blu-ray, 2 LP + EP, 2 CD | The first reissue after King relinquished the rights to the album. Featuring a new mono, stereo, and 5.1 surround sound mix with bonus material and previously unreleased demos. |

== Track listing ==
All songs written by Tony Banks, Peter Gabriel, Anthony Phillips, and Mike Rutherford. (Note: Per BMI records. The album notes ambiguously credit all songs as written by Genesis, which at the time included John Silver in addition to the four writers credited with BMI.)

Side one
| No. | Title | Length |
|---|---|---|
| 1. | "Where the Sour Turns to Sweet" | 3:14 |
| 2. | "In the Beginning" | 3:42 |
| 3. | "Fireside Song (Note: The piano intro to this song is an excerpt from "Holy Spirit, Ever Dwelling" by Herbert Howells.)" | 4:16 |
| 4. | "The Serpent" | 4:36 |
| 5. | "Am I Very Wrong?" | 3:28 |
| 6. | "In the Wilderness" | 3:21 |

Side two
| No. | Title | Length |
|---|---|---|
| 7. | "The Conqueror" | 3:44 |
| 8. | "In Hiding" | 2:56 |
| 9. | "One Day" | 3:16 |
| 10. | "Window" | 3:53 |
| 11. | "In Limbo" | 3:06 |
| 12. | "Silent Sun" | 2:08 |
| 13. | "A Place to Call My Own" | 1:57 |

== Personnel ==
Credits are adapted from the original 1969 release.

Genesis

- Peter Gabriel – lead vocals, flute
- Tony Banks – Hammond organ, piano, backing vocals
- Anthony Phillips – guitars, backing vocals
- Mike Rutherford – bass guitar, guitar, backing vocals
- John Silver – drums (except on "Silent Sun")

Additional musicians

- Chris Stewart – drums on "Silent Sun"
- Arthur Greenslade – strings and horn arrangement, conducting
- Lew Warburton – strings and horn arrangement, conducting
- David Thomas - backing vocals

Production

- Jonathan King – producer
- Brian Roberts – recording engineer
- Tom Allom – recording engineer
- Robert Stace – printing

== Charts ==
| Chart (1974) | Peak position |
|---|---|
| US Billboard 200 | 170 |

| Chart (2026) | Peak position |
|---|---|
| German Albums (Offizielle Top 100) | 28 |
| German Rock & Metal Albums (Offizielle Top 100) | 7 |
| Scottish Albums (Official Charts) | 19 |
| UK Albums Sales (Official Charts) | 18 |
| UK Independent Albums (Official Charts) | 9 |
| UK Rock & Metal Albums (Official Charts) | 4 |
