= It's Heavy in Here =

Studio album by Eric Matthews
- Released: September 26, 1995
- Recorded: Musicraft, Wilsonville, Oregon and Sound Impressions, Milwaukie, Oregon
- Genres: Orchestral pop; baroque pop
- Length: 41:07
- Label: Sub Pop
- Producer: Eric Matthews

Eric Matthews chronology
| It's Heavy in Here (1995) | The Lateness of the Hour (1997) |

Singles from It's Heavy in Here
- 1. "Fanfare" Released: October 16, 1995 (only released in UK)

It's Heavy in Here is the first solo studio album by the American singer-songwriter Eric Matthews. It was released by Sub Pop Records on September 26, 1995. A track from the album, "Fanfare", was released as a single in the UK, charting at No. 95.

== Critical reception ==
Professional ratings
Review scores
| Source | Rating |
|---|---|
| AllMusic | 4.5/5 stars |
| Robert Christgau | C+ |
| Entertainment Weekly | A− |

The New York Times concluded that Matthews "further defines the intersection where the self-styled pop arrangers of the 60's, the new-wave romantics of the 90's and the chamber-music composers of the 19th century meet." Rolling Stone noted that "repeated listens to It's Heavy in Here open up the comparisons to Robert Kirby's beautiful orchestration of English folk hero Nick Drake's work and even John Cale's haunting arrangements of Nico's solo material." Greg Kot, of the Chicago Tribune, listed the album as the fourth best of 1995.

== Track listing ==
All tracks are written by Eric Matthews.

| No. | Title | Length |
|---|---|---|
| 1. | "Fanfare" | 2:53 |
| 2. | "Forging Plastic Pain" | 3:14 |
| 3. | "Soul Nation Select Them" | 3:21 |
| 4. | "Faith to Clay" | 2:21 |
| 5. | "Angels for Crime" | 3:01 |
| 6. | "Fried Out Broken Girl" | 3:27 |
| 7. | "Lust Takes Time" | 2:40 |
| 8. | "Hop and Tickle" | 2:56 |
| 9. | "Three-Cornered Moon" | 3:06 |
| 10. | "Distant Mother Reality" | 2:18 |
| 11. | "Flight and Lion" | 3:38 |
| 12. | "Poisons Will Pass Me" | 2:36 |
| 13. | "Sincere Sensation" | 2:54 |
| 14. | "Fanfare (reprise)" | 2:18 |

== Personnel ==
- Phil Baldino – clarinets on "Angels for Crime"
- Robin Baldino – violin on "Soul Nation Select Them", "Three-Cornered Moon" and "Poisons Will Pass Me"
- Karen Bryan – violin on "Soul Nation Select Them", "Three-Cornered Moon" and "Poisons Will Pass Me"
- Kim Burton – viola on "Three-Cornered Moon" and "Poisons Will Pass Me"
- Dennis Conti – tenor saxophone on "Three-Cornered Moon"
- Curtis Daily – string bass on "Three-Cornered Moon" and "Poisons Will Pass Me"
- Jason Falkner – electric guitar on "Fanfare", "Forging Plastic Pain", "Hop and Tickle", "Distant Mother Reality" and "Flight and Lion"; bass on "Fanfare", "Soul Nation Select Them", "Hop and Tickle", "Distant Mother Reality", "Flight and Lion" and "Sincere Sensation"; drums on "Soul Nation Select Them" and "Lust Takes Time"; acoustic guitar on "Distant Mother Reality"; piano on "Flight and Lion"
- Steve Hanford – drums on "Fanfare", "Angels for Crime", "Hop and Tickle", "Flight and Lion" and "Sincere Sensation"
- Wendy Karden – flutes on "Soul Nation Select Them"
- Tony Lash – drums on "Forging Plastic Pain"; tambourine on "Sincere Sensation"
- Eric Matthews – all vocals; electric guitar on "Fanfare", "Lust Takes Time" and "Distant Mother Reality"; acoustic guitar on "Soul Nation Select Them", "Angels for Crime", "Hop and Tickle", "Flight and Lion", "Sincere Sensation" and "Fanfare (reprise); piano on "Soul Nation Select Them" and "Fried Out Broken Girl"; trumpets on "Fanfare", "Fried Out Broken Girl" and "Three-Cornered Moon"; harpsichord on "Faith to Clay" and "Three-Cornered Moon"; bass on "Angels for Crime" and "Lust Takes Time"; organ on "Three-Cornered Moon" and "Poisons Will Pass Me"; tenor recorder on "Distant Mother Reality"; Hammond B-3 organ on "Sincere Sensation"; percussion on "Sincere Sensation"
- Wes Matthews – acoustic guitar on "Faith to Clay"
- Lori Presthus – cello on "Soul Nation Select Them", "Three-Cornered Moon" and "Poisons Will Pass Me"
- Karen Strand – oboe on "Soul Nation Select Them"
