= The Lateness of the Hour =

The Lateness of the Hour may refer to:

- The Lateness of the Hour (The Twilight Zone), a 1960 episode of the American television series The Twilight Zone
- The Lateness of the Hour (Alex Clare album), 2011
- The Lateness of the Hour (Eric Matthews album), 1997
