= Chamber pop =

Subgenre of indie pop or indie rock

- Other names: Baroque pop; orchestral pop
- Stylistic origins: Rock; lounge; classical; indie rock; indie pop
- Cultural origins: 1960s–1990s, United States
- Typical instruments: Strings; horns; piano; chamberlin; vibraphone

Other topics
- List of chamber pop albums; él Records; lo-fi music; Shibuya-kei

Chamber pop (also called baroque pop and sometimes conflated with orchestral pop or symphonic pop) is a music genre that combines rock music with the intricate use of strings, horns, piano, and vocal harmonies, and other components drawn from the orchestral and lounge pop of the 1960s, with an emphasis on melody and texture.

During chamber pop's initial emergence in the 1960s, producers such as Jerry Leiber and Mike Stoller, Burt Bacharach, Lee Hazlewood, the Beatles and the Beach Boys' Brian Wilson served as formative artists of the genre. Wilson's productions of the Beach Boys' albums Pet Sounds and Smile are cited as particularly influential to the genre. From the early 1970s to early 1990s, most chamber pop acts saw little to no mainstream success. The genre's decline was attributed to costly touring and recording logistics and a reluctance among record labels to finance instruments like strings, horns, and keyboards on artists' albums.

In the mid-1990s, chamber pop developed as a subgenre of indie rock or indie pop in which musicians opposed the distorted guitars, lo-fi aesthetic, and simple arrangements common to the alternative or "modern rock" groups of that era. In Japan, the movement was paralleled by Shibuya-kei, another indie genre that was formed on some of the same bedrock of influences. By the 2000s, the term "chamber pop" would be inconsistently applied to a variety of bands whose work attracted comparisons to Pet Sounds.

== Definition and etymology ==
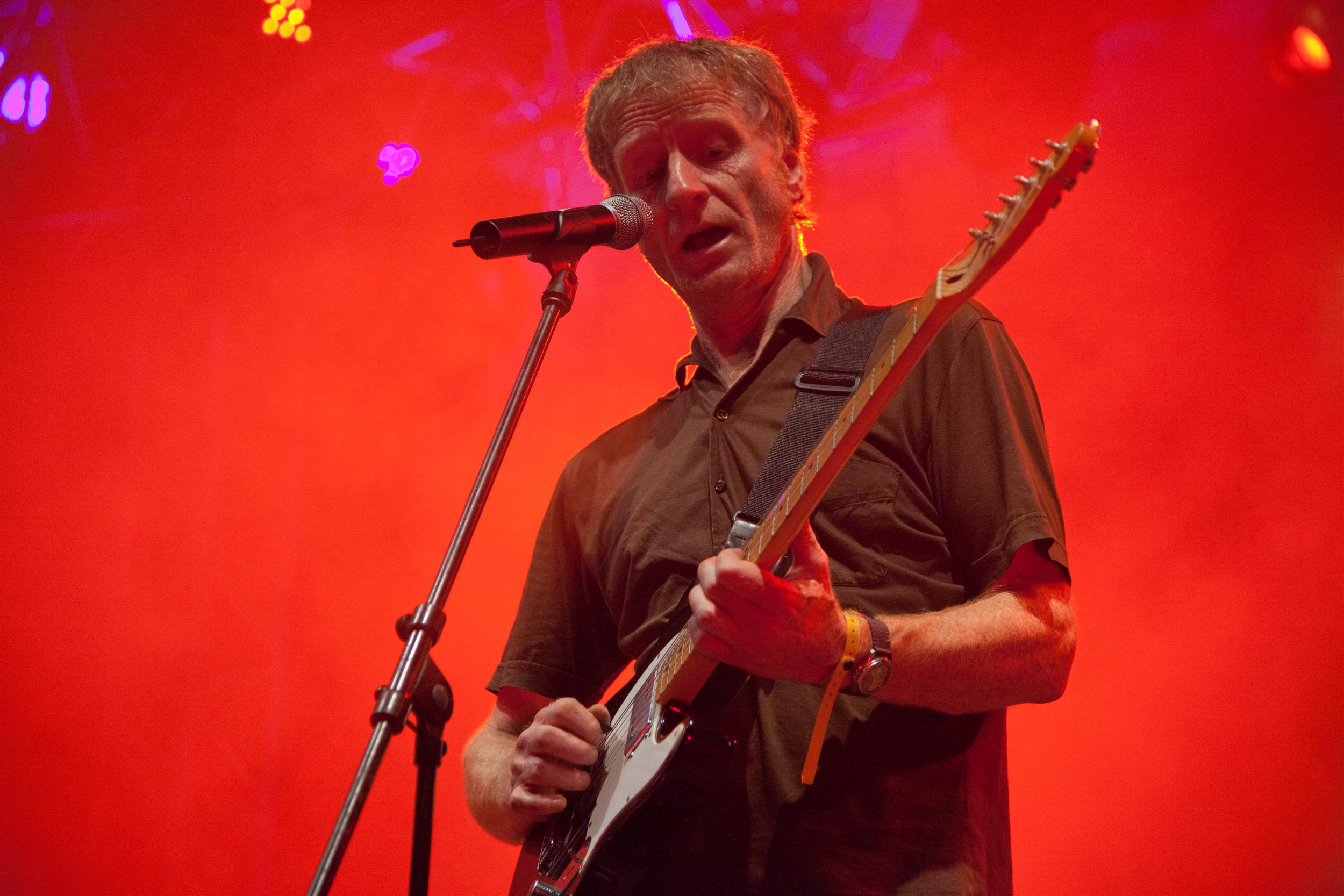
The High Llamas performing in 2011 (leader Sean O'Hagan pictured)

The combination of string sections and rock music has been called "symphonic pop", "chamber pop", and orchestral pop (or "ork-pop" for short). The first use of strings in R&B or rock music was in the 1959 song "There Goes My Baby" by The Drifters, produced by Jerry Leiber and Mike Stoller with string arrangement by Stan Applebaum. The following year, The Shirelles song "Will You Love Me Tomorrow", written by Carole King and featuring a string section, was released to critical acclaim and rose to #1 on the Billboard Magazine Hot 100 chart. The Beatles began implementing string arrangements in their music, starting with the 1965 song "Yesterday," and further expanded upon the use of horns and strings on their 1966 album Revolver. The Beach Boys would develop their response to The Beatles' 1965 album Rubber Soul with their own 1966 studio album Pet Sounds, which would further explore the use of strings in rock music and define the baroque pop genre.

Ork-pop refers to a branch of underground rock musicians who shared an affinity with the Pet Sounds album, such as The High Llamas and bands from the Elephant 6 collective. According to CMJ's David Jerman, the name was the creation of rock critics, "encompassing everyone from fans of the Beach Boys to fans of Bacharach and Mancini". Chamber pop is stylistically diverse. AllMusic states that the genre carries on the "spirit" of the baroque pop of the 1960s, while cultural writers Joseph Fisher and Brian Flota call it the "heir" to baroque pop. (Note: Although baroque pop was prefigured by producers like Phil Spector, whose arrangements were orchestral and heavily layered, the genre was distinguished for its Romantic aesthetic, small string ensembles, and more classically-derived melodies.) Strongly influenced by the rich orchestrations of Burt Bacharach, Brian Wilson, and Lee Hazlewood, chamber pop artists once again focused on melody and texture. Another major source of influence was the singer Scott Walker. New York Daily News' Jim Farber summarizes the genre; "think Donovan meets Burt Bacharach". (Note: Spin magazine refers to Bacharach and Wilson as "gods" of orchestral pop. In journalist Chris Nickson's opinion, the "apex" of orchestral pop lied in Walker, explaining that "in his most fertile period, 1967–70, he created a body of work that was, in its own way, as revolutionary as the Beatles'. He took the ideas of Mancini and Bacharach to their logical conclusion, essentially redefining the concept of orchestral pop.")

The Beach Boys – "Wonderful" (1967 Smile recording)
Described as "proto-psychedelic chamber pop" by biographer Mark Dillon, "Wonderful" showcases Wilson's lead vocals and harpsichord-playing supported by trumpet and the Beach Boys' "parlor-room harmonies".

Newsmakers believes that the Beach Boys' Pet Sounds helped define chamber pop as "intimate, precisely arranged songs with rock's sweep but without its bluesy clamor." (Note: Writing about the album's title track in his 2017 memoir, Wilson said: "I loved Thunderball, which had come out the year before, and I loved listening to composers like Henry Mancini, who did these cool themes for shows like Peter Gunn, and Les Baxter, who did all these big productions that sounded sort of like Phil Spector productions.") Following the album was the group's unfinished 1966–67 work Smile, a collaboration between Brian Wilson and lyricist Van Dyke Parks that also heavily influenced the genre. According to the High Llamas' Sean O'Hagan, Pet Sounds had been "the beginning of the great pop experiment. But it wasn't allowed to continue, because rock and roll got hold of the whole thing and stopped it. Pop didn't take off again until this decade [the 1990s]." Author Carl Wilson (no relation) says that Brian's "pained vulnerability", "uses of offbeat instruments", "intricate harmonies", and "the Smile saga itself" became a common reference point for chamber pop bands. (Note: Smile, whose recordings remained unreleased for decades, was embraced by the alternative rock generation once bootlegs from the album became more widespread in the late 1980s and early 1990s.) Just as ork-pop acts shared a love for Wilson, they also held an admiration for one another's work.

The term chamber pop to describe this emerging genre was first used in the mid-1980s, blending the terms pop and chamber music, the latter referring to classical music played with a small number of musicians rather than with a full orchestra. In the late 1980s, the majority of Louis Phillipe's productions for él Records also made sophisticated use of orchestras and voices that embodied and defined the chamber pop style. (Note: Philippe described his own music as: "covering the range from pure bubblegum to symphonic sweep, with detours via jazz and soul along the way. A typical album might mix influences from vintage pop, French chanson, Ravel, bossa nova, Duke Ellington, the Shirelles, or the Beach Boys, while classical instruments and intricate backing vocals often feature in the arrangements.")

Chamber pop was part of a larger trend which involved musicians who rejected traditional rock conventions, such as Tortoise and Stereolab, although those specific bands are not considered ork-pop. (Note: Writing about the new "post-rock" in 1994, Simon Reynolds noted the influence of Spector, Wilson, and Brian Eno; specifically their preoccupation for "soundscaping" that involves "using musicians as a sort of palette of textures, as opposed to the rock band's collective toil.") The genre's orchestration is typically more complex than rock music, making extensive use of brass and strings. It drew from the 1990s lounge music revival but avoided any influence from other contemporary styles like grunge, electronica, or alternative music, particularly the lo-fi hiss and distortion of the last. Although modern rock groups like Smashing Pumpkins, The Verve, Oasis, and R.E.M. occasionally used strings, their approach was considerably less intricate. The High Llamas were one of the first to anticipate the easy-listening fad with their 1993 album Gideon Gaye. O'Hagan felt that "There is this whole misconception that American college rock with twisted baseball hats and checked shirts is adventurous, but it's the most conformist, corporate thing out there." with Eric Matthews adding "All these bands sound like Nirvana and Pearl Jam. It's a shame that it couldn't be discovered from the get-go for what it is. A lot of it is just very simple dumb-guy rock."

== History ==
=== Emergence and popularity ===
Bored by the three-chord simplicity of grunge and neo-punk, a new breed of popsmiths is going back to such inspirations as Brian Wilson, Burt Bacharach, and Phil Spector in the quest for building the perfect orchestrated pop masterpiece. [...] their music offers an alternative for those who have grown tired of distorted guitars and angst-ridden vocals.

— Craig Rosen writing in Billboard, 1996

Fisher and Flota trace chamber pop to "at least" the mid 1990s. According to Natalie Waliek of music retailer Newbury Comics, the then-"renewed interest in psychedelia" and the "overlap with the cocktail/lounge music thing, because that music [also] has orchestrations", likely contributed to the sales of ork-pop albums, but acts were restricted to only a moderate degree of commercial success. The majority of musicians were aged beyond their early 20s, and many struggled to achieve significant retail or radio success compared to modern rock. In the past, record companies had helped facilitate large multi-instrumental bands by financing instruments like strings, horns, and keyboards on artists' albums, but this became rarer as time went on. Touring with full string and brass ensembles also proved difficult for some, which became another factor that prevented the genre's mainstream success.

In Japan, a remote parallel was the development of Shibuya-kei, which also revisited the trend of foregrounding instruments like strings and horns in its arrangements. The genre was informed by classic Western pop music, especially the orchestral domains occupied by Burt Bacharach, Brian Wilson, Phil Spector, and Serge Gainsbourg. Unlike other Japanese music scenes, its audiences did not necessarily cross over into anime fandoms, but rather indie pop enthusiasts. This was partly because many of its bands were distributed in the United States through major indie labels like Matador and Grand Royal. (Note: Philippe was surprised to be heralded as the "godfather" of the Shibuya sound around the time he released the Japan-only albums Jean Renoir (1992) and Rainfall (1993). The movement's musicians romanticized Wilson as a mad genius experimenting in the recording studio, and Spector's Wall of Sound was emulated not for its denseness, but for its elaborate quality.) Shibuya-kei ultimately peaked in the late 1990s and declined after its principal players began moving into other music styles.

Plush – "Found a Little Baby" (1994)
Billboard's Chris Morris wrote that this debut single by Hayes made "quite a splash with the international press ... heralded as the harbinger of a new school of orchestral pop – 'ork pop' for short."

In a 1996 profile of ork-pop, Craig Rosen lists examples that include Yum-Yum, the High Llamas, Richard Davies, Eric Matthews, Spookey Ruben, Witch Hazel, and Liam Hayes (Plush). Matthews, who partnered with Davies for duo Cardinal, was considered a leading figure in ork-pop. Popmatters' Maria Schurr wrote in a retrospective review of Cardinal's eponymous 1994 debut album; "in some circles, [it has] been called the grunge era's answer to Pet Sounds, and, although it has not been as widely cited as the Beach Boys' classic, it has undoubtedly influenced more off balance indie popsters than one may expect." Music journalist Jim DeRogatis associates the ork-pop and chamber pop movement to bands like Yum-Yum, Cardinal and Lambchop. (Note: In 2004, when asking the Decemberists' bandleader Colin Meloy whether he felt a connection with the movement and the band's work, Meloy answered; "I don't know if we've ever been labeled that before. So much attention gets put on the lyrical content—the songs themselves—that people don't pay as close attention to the arrangements, which is something we're trying to change. ... I think the orchestral side—the cinematic side of the music—is going to come through more and more.")

=== 2000s–present ===
By 2009, the term "chamber pop" had fallen to general misuse, as songwriter/author Scott Miller suggests, it "made more sense applied to the Fleet Foxes than to other bands I've since seen it applied to". He also noted that Pet Sounds had become a ubiquitous object of comparison; "[If people] are happy about that, I have to pinch myself and reflect that I'd never thought I'd see the day." Treblezine's Brian Roster wrote that Grizzly Bear's album Veckatimest was a "landmark exploration of the changing landscapes of pop in 2009" that represented an attempt to create "a sort of abridged conclusion to chamber pop's earliest days".

== Sources ==
- DeRogatis, Jim (2003). Turn on Your Mind: Four Decades of Great Psychedelic Rock. Hal Leonard Corporation. ISBN 978-0-634-05548-5. Archived from the original on July 27, 2020.
- Dillon, Mark (2012). Fifty Sides of the Beach Boys: The Songs That Tell Their Story. ECW Press. ISBN 978-1-77090-198-8.
- Flota, Brian; Fisher, Joseph P. (2013). The Politics of Post-9/11 Music: Sound, Trauma, and the Music Industry in the Time of Terror. Ashgate Publishing, Ltd. ISBN 978-1-4094-9492-8. Archived from the original on July 27, 2020.
- Janovitz, Bill (2013). Rocks Off: 50 Tracks That Tell the Story of the Rolling Stones. St. Martin's Press. ISBN 978-1-250-02631-6. Archived from the original on July 27, 2020.
- Kamp, David; Daly, Steven (2005). The Rock Snob's Dictionary: An Essential Lexicon Of Rockological Knowledge. Broadway Books. ISBN 978-0-7679-1873-2. Archived from the original on April 7, 2017.
- Miller, Scott (2010). Music: What Happened?. 125 Records. ISBN 978-0-615-38196-1. Archived from the original on July 24, 2020.
- Priore, Domenic (2005). Smile: The Story of Brian Wilson's Lost Masterpiece. London: Sanctuary. ISBN 1-86074-627-6.
- Tonelli, Christopher (2004). Shibuya-kei? O-kei Desu!: Postmodernism, Resistance, and Tokyo Indie Culture. University of California, San Diego. Archived from the original on July 27, 2020.
- Wilson, Brian; Greenman, Ben (2016). I Am Brian Wilson: A Memoir. Da Capo Press. ISBN 978-0-306-82307-7. Archived from the original on July 26, 2020.
