= The Lateness of the Hour (Eric Matthews album) =

Studio album by Eric Matthews
- Released: 1997
- Label: Sub Pop
- Producers: Eric Matthews, Tony Lash

Eric Matthews chronology
It's Heavy in Here (1995)	The Lateness of the Hour (1997)	Six Kinds of Passion Looking for an Exit (2005)

The Lateness of the Hour is the second album by the American musician Eric Matthews, released in 1997. "My Morning Parade" was originally included as a 7" single with the vinyl version of the album. The album was part of the ork pop trend of the 1990s.

== Production ==
The Lateness of the Hour was produced by Tony Lash and Matthews, who also played flugelhorn and harpsichord, among other instruments. Jason Falkner played guitar on the album; Matthews's younger brother Wes also contributed. Three songs, "Gilded Cages", "To Clear the Air", and "Festival Fun", do not include drums, bass, or guitar. Matthews recorded the vocals and acoustic guitars with Manley microphones.

== Critical reception ==
Professional ratings
Review scores
Source	Rating
AllMusic	4/5 stars
The Encyclopedia of Popular Music	3/5 stars
Entertainment Weekly	B+
MusicHound Rock: The Essential Album Guide	2/5 stars

Salon wrote that "it's ironic that the album's best moments are those when he tears down his Brill Building façade and turns the guitars up a bit, as on 'Everything So Real' and especially 'The Pleasant Kind', the one song where Matthews' melodic sensibility doesn't sound grave-robbed." Entertainment Weekly noted that "this smooth, lovely set of melancholia is never overwhelmed by its ambitions."

The Boston Globe stated that "Matthews' exceptional music is lovely and strange; if only his opaque lyrics were equally evocative." Rolling Stone determined that "the piano, bass and spare percussion on 'No Gnashing Teeth' serve an arrangement that would make Brian Wilson proud." The Dayton Daily News opined that Matthews "sings in a hushed whisper reminiscent of the late folkie Nick Drake."

The St. Catharines Standard listed it among the best 20 albums of 1997. The Philadelphia Inquirer also considered it to be one of 1997's best, deeming it a "florid masterwork."

AllMusic wrote that "the best songs have an effortless grace, while even the weaker moments are enjoyable because of the lavish arrangements."

== Track listing ==
No.	Title	Length
1.	"Ideas That Died That Day"
2.	"My Morning Parade"
3.	"Pair of Cherry"
4.	"To Clear the Air"
5.	"Yes, Everyone"
6.	"Everything So Real"
7.	"Becomes Dark Blue"
8.	"The Pleasant Kind"
9.	"Gilded Cages"
10.	"Dopeyness"
11.	"Since the Wheel Free"
12.	"Festival Fun"
13.	"No Gnashing Teeth"
