= The Moles (Australian band) =

Australian indie pop band

- Origin: Australia
- Genres: Chamber pop Alternative rock Indie pop
- Years active: 1988–1993; 1994–present
- Label: Splendid Research Records
- Members: Richard Davies; Glenn Fredericks; Carl Zadro; Warren Armstrong; Oliver Strauch; Jack Holland; David Newgarden; Hamish Kilgour; Aaron Flagg; Mick Meredith

The Moles are an Australian indie pop band founded and led by Richard Davies.

== History ==
The Moles were formed in Sydney and debuted in 1990 with the EP Propeller. In 1991 they released their second EP, Tendrils and Paracetamol. 1992 followed their first album Untune the Sky, after which The Moles relocated to New York, where they released a pair of seven-inch singles (later packaged together as the Double Single EP).

After a move to London, The Moles broke up in 1993.

In 1994, Davies revived The Moles as a solo project, which resulted in their second album Instinct.

== Discography ==
=== Albums ===
- Untune the Sky (1992, Seaside Records)
- Instinct (1994, Flydaddy Records)
- Tonight's Music (2016, Fire Records (UK))
- Code Word (2018, Super Secret Records)
- Composition Book (2025, Splendid Research Records)

=== EPs ===
- Tendrils and Paracetamol (1991, Seaside Records)
- The Moles (1992, Seaside Records)

=== Singles ===
- "Propeller" (1990, Secret Family Records)
- "Seaside Split" with Brokenhead and Headache (1991, Seaside Records)

=== Compilations ===
- Flashbacks and Dream Sequences (2014, Fire Records (UK))
