= The Knife (song) =

Single by Genesis

from the album Trespass
- Released: 4 June 1971
- Recorded: July 1970
- Genre: Progressive rock
- Length: 8:57
- Label: Charisma/Phonogram (UK and internationally); ABC Records (US/Canada)
- Songwriters: Tony Banks, Peter Gabriel, Anthony Phillips, Mike Rutherford
- Producer: John Anthony

Genesis singles chronology
"Where the Sour Turns to Sweet" (1969)	"The Knife" (1971)	"Happy The Man" (1972)

"The Knife" is a song by progressive rock band Genesis from their second album, Trespass (1970). The first half of the song was released as a single in May 1971 with the second half as the B-side, but it did not chart. The heavy, progressive rock style of the song was a marked change from previous Genesis songs; it showed the band pioneering a new direction.

== Composition ==
The song was unusually aggressive for Genesis at the time, as most of their work consisted of soft, pastoral acoustic textures and poetic lyrics. It features a bouncy, march-like organ riff, heavily distorted guitars and bass, and fast drumming. (Peter Gabriel said he wanted to write something that had the excitement of "Rondo" by the Nice, and the song's working title was "Nice".) In the lyrics of the song, Gabriel, influenced by a book on Gandhi, "wanted to try [to] show how all violent revolutions inevitably end up with a dictator in power". Genesis guitarist Anthony Phillips helped with the lyrics, writing lines such as "Carry their heads to the palace of old".

A flute solo played by Gabriel is included midway through the composition. The song is in the key of A♭ minor, a difficult key on the flute, so in concert Gabriel would pull the two pieces of his flute apart slightly to lower its pitch by a semitone, then transpose the fingering up a semitone to A minor. Tony Banks tried to remind Gabriel to adjust the flute before each performance, but occasionally the flute solo was performed in the wrong key. Live versions of the song occasionally exceeded twenty minutes in length.

The song features a spoken word interlude in which a group of soldiers are confronted by a crowd of protesters chanting "freedom" and attempt to disperse them by "[firing] over their heads," only to massacre the protesters instead. This portion was inspired by the Kent State shootings from the previous spring. Who provided the numerous voices for this interlude (particularly the female ones) is largely unknown, though Phillips has identified the voice prominently heard at 5:08 as producer John Anthony.

The cover artwork for the single features (clockwise from top left) Gabriel, Phil Collins, Rutherford, Banks and Steve Hackett. Collins and Hackett did not perform on the track but joined the group shortly after the album was recorded, replacing John Mayhew and Anthony Phillips, respectively.

It later appeared on the 2004 compilation album Platinum Collection and the single edit is found on the expanded version of Turn It On Again: The Hits, subtitled The Tour Edition. In March 2014, Steve Hackett added the song on the tracklist on the extended tour of his Genesis Revisited II album. The song also appears on the R-Kive box set released on 22 September 2014 in the UK and 29 September worldwide.

== Live performances ==
As the final song in their set, "The Knife" was performed often in the band's first five years (a live version appears on the Genesis Live album from 1973). It was dropped from their regular set for the 1973-74 tour for Selling England by the Pound, though it was occasionally played as an encore during that tour, and appeared sporadically in the band's concerts through 1982.

== Personnel ==
- Tony Banks – Hammond organ, backing vocals
- Peter Gabriel – lead vocals, flute, percussion
- John Mayhew – drums, backing vocals
- Anthony Phillips – guitar, backing vocals
- Mike Rutherford – bass, backing vocals
