= Cardinal (band) =

American indie-pop band

- Origin: Boston, Massachusetts, U.S.
- Genres: Indie pop; chamber pop; orchestral pop
- Years active: 1992–1995; 2011–present
- Labels: Flydaddy; Fire
- Members: Richard Davies; Eric Matthews

Cardinal is an American indie pop duo founded by musicians Richard Davies and Eric Matthews. The duo was formed in 1992 following Davies' relocation from Australia to the United States, where he met Matthews while both were living in Boston, Massachusetts. Davies serves as Cardinal's lead vocalist and lyricist, while Matthews handles musical arrangements. Cardinal's ornate musical sound, heavily inspired by 1960s baroque pop, has been credited as a major influence on subsequent indie chamber pop artists from the 1990s onward.

Cardinal released their self-titled debut album in 1994 to critical acclaim, but disbanded the following year amid internal disagreements. After several years during which Davies and Matthews remained out of contact with each other, Davies approached Matthews with a request for assistance on some songs that Davies had written, eventually leading the two to revive the Cardinal project in 2011. Cardinal's second album, Hymns, was released in 2012.

== Discography ==
Studio albums

- Cardinal (1994)
- Hymns (2012)
