= Eric Matthews (musician) =

American composer, musician, recording artist and record producer

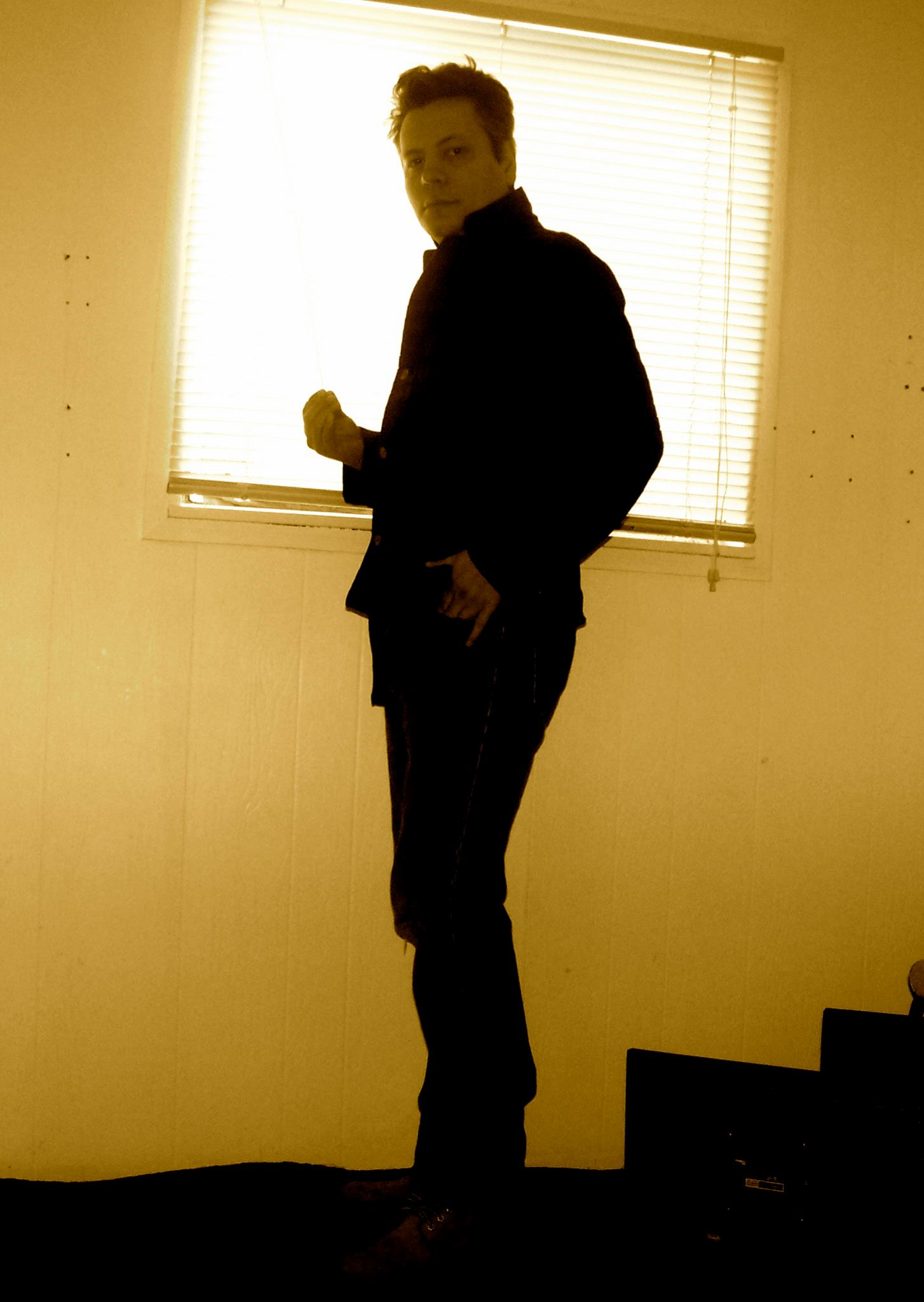
- Matthews in 2012
- Born: January 12, 1969 (age 57); Compton, California, United States
- Occupations: composer, musician, recording artist, record producer
- Musical career
- Genres: Orchestral pop; baroque pop
- Labels: Sub Pop; Empyrean; Lo-Fidelity
- Formerly of: Cardinal; SheLoom; Seinking Ships; Belt Buckle
- Website: https://ericmatthews.net

Eric Matthews (born January 12, 1969, in Compton, California, United States) is an American composer, musician, recording artist, and record producer.

== Career ==
Eric Matthews began his serious recording career as one half of the band Cardinal. Cardinal was formed with Australian singer-songwriter Richard Davies in 1992 while both lived in Boston, Massachusetts. Cardinal introduced Matthews as a multi-instrumentalist and arranger while Davies contributed most of the songwriting. Cardinal, while not a huge commercial success, made a big splash among sophisticated music fans in most of the West's big cities and, with its 1994 self-titled debut, cemented itself as one of the pivotal bands of the 1990s. In 1993, Matthews collaborated with Sebadoh's Lou Barlow and Bob Fay as Belt Buckle, releasing an EP on Sonic Bubblegum Records.

In 1995, Matthews released his debut solo record on Sub Pop Records. It's Heavy In Here, described as "a darkly luxuriant sequence of exquisitely arranged and executed orchestral pop", featured the radio hit "Fanfare" and went on to be a top seller for Sub Pop and received positive reviews. In 1997, the follow-up album The Lateness of the Hour was released on Sub Pop. It did not sell as well as It's Heavy In Here, but included orchestral instruments within its rock stylings.

Sub Pop and Matthews terminated their relationship in 1999, and he began working as a sideman for such groups as Tahiti 80, The Dandy Warhols, Ivy, Man of the Year, Elliott Smith, Paula Kelley, Pugwash, Volovan, and Bug 2000.

In 2004, Matthews began a relationship with Empyrean Records to re-issue the Cardinal record. He has since continued to release music under the Empyrean label.

In 2005, Matthews released his third solo record, titled Six Kinds of Passion Looking For An Exit, and in 2006 another album titled Foundation Sounds. In the summer of 2006, Matthews announced that he and a guitarist from Cleveland named Christopher Seink had formed a new instrumental band called Seinking Ships. In 2008, Eric Matthews and Empyrean Records released The Imagination Stage to a flurry of glowing reviews heralding Eric's return to the fully orchestrated sound of his Sub Pop releases. In March 2009, Eric ended his professional relationship with Empyrean Records. In 2013 Eric joined the band SheLoom.

Collaborations/guest musicians include: Richard Davies, Jason Falkner, Spookey Ruben, Elliott Smith, Gregg Williams, Tony Lash, Robert Harris, Christopher Seink, Mark Eitzel, Lou Barlow, Bob Fay, R. Stevie Moore, and Steven Hanford.

== Discography ==
=== With Cardinal ===
- Toy Bell (EP) (1993) Flydaddy Records
- Cardinal (1994) Flydaddy
- Cardinal (album re-issue with eleven bonus tracks and expanded liner notes) (2005) Empyrean Records
- Hymns (album) (2012) Fire Records

=== With Belt Buckle ===
- Belt Buckle (EP) (1993) Sonic Bubblegum

=== With Seinking Ships ===
- Seinking Ships (EP) (2007) Empyrean
- Museum Quality Capture (LP) (June 8, 2010) S-Curve Records/EMI

=== Solo ===
==== Albums ====
- It's Heavy in Here (1995) Sub Pop
- The Lateness of the Hour (1997) Sub Pop
- Six Kinds of Passion Looking For An Exit (2005) Empyrean
- Foundation Sounds (2006) Empyrean
- The Imagination Stage (2008) Empyrean
- Too Much World (2017) Lo-Fidelity

==== Singles ====
- "Dream Figure" (1994) Flydaddy Records
- "Fanfare" (1995) Sub Pop (US)
- "Fanfare" (1996) Sub Pop/WEA (UK, Europe, and Asia)
- "Hop And Tickle" (1996) Sub Pop
- "My Morning Parade" (1997) Sub Pop (US)
- "Exactly Like Them" (2017) Lo-Fidelity
