= Cardinal (Cardinal album) =

Studio album by Cardinal
- Released: November 1994
- Recorded: March 1994
- Genre: Orchestral pop; chamber pop; baroque pop
- Length: 30:34
- Label: Flydaddy

Cardinal chronology
Cardinal (1994)	Hymns (2012)

Professional ratings
Review scores
Source	Rating
AllMusic	4.5/5 stars
Entertainment Weekly	B+
NME	7/10
Q	3/5 stars
Record Collector	4/5 stars
Uncut	4/5 stars

Cardinal is the debut album by American indie pop duo Cardinal, released in 1994.

== Track listing ==
1. "If You Believe in Christmas Trees" – 3:59
2. "Last Poems" – 2:41
3. "Big Mink" – 2:50
4. "You've Lost Me There" – 4:28
5. "Public Melody #1" – 1:35
6. "Dream Figure" – 3:01
7. "Tough Guy Tactics" – 2:26
8. "Angel Darling" – 2:52
9. "Singing to the Sunshine" – 2:46
10. "Silver Machines" – 3:54

2005 expanded edition bonus tracks

11. "Forest Theme" – 0:43
12. "If You Believe in Christmas Trees" (demo) – 3:52
13. "Willow Willow" – 2:42
14. "You've Lost Me There" (demo) – 5:15
15. "Outtake" – 0:13
16. "Tribute to a Cow" – 1:26
17. "Tough Guy Tactics" (demo) – 2:28
18. "Say the Words Impossible" (demo) – 2:43
19. "Poolside '75" – 1:46
20. "Sweatshirt Gown" – 1:21
21. "Say the Words Impossible" – 3:26
