= Garden Wall (band) =

British band (1965–1967)

- Origin: Surrey, England
- Genres: Rock
- Years active: 1965–1967
- Spinoffs: Genesis
- Past members: Tony Banks; Peter Gabriel; Chris Stewart

Garden Wall were a band from Charterhouse School in Surrey that went on to merge with the remains of another band from the same school, Anon, to form the progressive rock band Genesis in 1967. The band were formed around May 1965 and consisted of Peter Gabriel (vocals), Tony Banks (keyboards) and Chris Stewart (drums).

== History ==
The band formed in May 1965, although it had its roots back in September 1963 when Tony Banks and Peter Gabriel both entered Charterhouse. Both of them did not like the school for their first year there, and as arriving at the same time, they stuck together throughout the first year. It did not take long for them to discover their common passion of music. Banks and Gabriel would go into the nearby towns and villages and listen to whatever music was playing in the record stores at the time. The two of them were members of the Duckites house at Charterhouse, and there was a piano in the main hall which they used to go and play on. These occasions in the main hall were the first musical collaborations between Banks and Gabriel.

During his time at Charterhouse, Peter Gabriel had been drumming for the bands The Spoken Word and Millords. As a result of his time in this band, Gabriel started songwriting with Banks. The first song Gabriel and Banks wrote together eventually evolved into a track called "She Is Beautiful", and eventually became known as "The Serpent". In 1969, "The Serpent" was released on Genesis' debut album From Genesis to Revelation.

In May 1965, when future Genesis guitarist Anthony Phillips had joined the school, a five-piece band called Anon had come into existence. It was around this time that Gabriel and Banks got together with Phillips' friend Chris Stewart (who was not a member of Anon), and together they formed a three-piece band featuring Gabriel on vocals, Banks on piano, and Stewart on drums. This band named itself Garden Wall. The band went on to play cover songs and new songs that Banks and Gabriel were writing together.

In December 1965, Garden Wall played their only concert, on a stage inside Charterhouse School on a double bill with Anon. Gabriel showered the audience with rose petals that he had spent the afternoon picking.

Garden Wall's fellow band splintered at this point, with two of the members leaving in the summer and a third member leaving towards the end of the year. This left Phillips and Mike Rutherford, the band's two guitarists, who then joined all three of the members of Garden Wall in 1967 to form Genesis.

== Members ==
- Tony Banks - keyboards (May 1965 - January 1967)
- Peter Gabriel - lead vocals (May 1965 - January 1967)
- Chris Stewart - drums (May 1965 - January 1967)
