= Richard Davies (musician) =

Australian-American musician

Richard Davies (born 1964) is an Australian-American musician.

Davies was born in Sydney, Australia.

He first came to prominence in the early 1990s as leader of the Australian band The Moles. Upon moving to the United States, Davies joined with Eric Matthews to form Cardinal, whose debut album, Cardinal, was released by Flydaddy in 1994. He has since released several solo albums including There's Never Been a Crowd Like This (1996), Telegraph (1998), and Barbarians (2000). In 2009, Davies and Guided by Voices front man Robert Pollard, collaborating under the name Cosmos, released an album, Jar of Jam / Ton of Bricks. In 2012, Davies and Matthews reformed Cardinal and released a second album, Hymns.
