= The Silent Sun =

1968 debut single by Genesis

- 2006 reissue sleeve

Single by Genesis

from the album From Genesis to Revelation
- B-side: "That's Me"
- Released: 2 February 1968; July 2006 (reissue)
- Recorded: December 1967
- Genre: Baroque pop
- Length: 2:13
- Label: Decca (UK); Parrot (US)
- Songwriters: Tony Banks; Peter Gabriel; Anthony Phillips; Mike Rutherford
- Producer: Jonathan King

Genesis singles chronology
"The Silent Sun" (1968)	"A Winter's Tale" (1968)
"Carpet Crawlers 1999" (1999)	"The Silent Sun 2006" (2006)

"The Silent Sun" (album title "Silent Sun") is a song by English rock band Genesis. It was written when the band's producer, Jonathan King, first discovered them, before he decided to produce an entire album, a heavy investment. Knowing that King was a fan of the Bee Gees, they wrote the song specifically to capture his attention. The song was released as a mono single in February 1968. A stereo mix of it appears on their debut album, From Genesis to Revelation.

"The Silent Sun" is a fusion of folk rock and pop rock with orchestral strings and romantic lyrics. On both the single and album releases it was credited as being written by "Genesis." As of the single release the group consisted of Tony Banks, Peter Gabriel, Anthony Phillips, Mike Rutherford, and Chris Stewart, though John Silver had replaced Stewart by the time of the album release. In interviews the band has said that "The Silent Sun" was written solely by Gabriel and Banks. Reviewing the single upon its release, Peter Jones of Record Mirror called the it a "rather classy" song from "an unusual sounding group".

The song was reissued in very limited quantities in July 2006 as a CD single under the title "The Silent Sun 2006", with "When the Sour Turns to Sweet 2006" as its B-side, and credited to "Peter Gabriel and Genesis". The versions on this CD-single are remix/remaster versions with overdubbed drums, also available on the 2006 reissue of the band's 1969 debut album. Since this is the last official single release by Genesis, this makes "The Silent Sun" both the debut and the final single released by Genesis.

== Personnel ==
- Tony Banks – piano, backing vocals
- Peter Gabriel – lead vocals
- Anthony Phillips – acoustic guitar, backing vocals
- Mike Rutherford – bass, backing vocals
- Chris Stewart – drums

Additional personnel

- Arthur Greenslade – orchestral arrangements
