= John Mayhew (musician) =

- John Mayhew in Italy, 2006

Background information
- Born: 27 March 1947; Ipswich, Suffolk, England
- Origin: London, England
- Died: 26 March 2009 (aged 61) Glasgow, Scotland
- Genres: Classical, rock, progressive rock
- Instruments: Drums, percussions, backing vocals
- Years active: 1969–1970, 2006
- Formerly of: Genesis

John Mayhew (27 March 1947 – 26 March 2009) was an English musician, best known for his brief tenure as the drummer of the progressive rock band Genesis. He replaced the band's previous drummer, John Silver, in August 1969, and was himself replaced in August 1970 by Phil Collins. Mayhew appears on the album Trespass, as well as the Genesis Archive 1967-75 and Genesis 1970–1975 box sets, and was the first drummer to perform with Genesis in concert.

== Early years ==
Mayhew grew up in Ipswich with his brother Paul who was some ten years older. His parents parted and John, who by then was in his teens, went with his father. After that he saw very little of his brother, who had remained with John's mother. At twelve years old John had some poetry published in a London literary magazine. He inherited his love of music from his mother, and played with bands in the Ipswich area, such as 'The Clique' and 'The Epics'. He moved to the London scene in the late sixties, where he joined another band, 'Milton's Finger', and recorded a few songs, two of which (Jenny's mother / Love of my life) ended up on an acetate 7".

== Genesis ==
Mayhew joined Genesis in the summer of 1969 to replace departing drummer John Silver, who enrolled at Cornell University in the US to study leisure management. Genesis had placed an advert for a drummer in Melody Maker, but though legend says Mayhew was recruited via this advert, Mayhew said in a 2006 interview that Mike Rutherford contacted him after finding his phone number, which Mayhew had been leaving 'all over London'. The band was impressed by Mayhew's long-haired appearance and professionalism, plus the fact he brought his own drums with him. As well as being a professional musician, Mayhew was also a carpenter. He installed proper panelling and seating in the band's transport, a former bread delivery van, as well as building the cabinet for a home-made Leslie speaker that would often grind to a halt during live performances.

Genesis made their live debut at a friend's party in October 1969, with their first professional concert on 4 November, in both cases with Mayhew on drums. He famously earned himself a good-natured rebuke from his bandmates when, upon being offered a wage of £15 per week by new record company Charisma (approximately £142 as of 2016), insisted that £10 was more than enough. Mayhew stayed with Genesis until his dismissal in July 1970. He was replaced by Phil Collins.

Genesis guitarist Anthony Phillips recalled of Mayhew, "He was a good drummer but we were very, very demanding and I think he always felt he came up short. He didn't really, he did a fine job. ... I think, had they found a more prosaic drummer afterwards, then history would speak more kindly about John, but he's cast in a rather dim light, which I always think is rather unfair." In a memorial tribute to Mayhew, Tony Banks wrote, "John was a bit older than us and had played live in [another band] so he had some knowledge of what was expected on stage."

== Post-Genesis ==
Little was known of Mayhew's whereabouts following his departure from Genesis. By the late 1970s he had married a New Zealand girl and bought a house that he was doing up, in Wellington New Zealand, He played drums in a Pub band "Kelly and Friend" which had residency at the Abel Tasman hotel in Willis Street. The marriage was short lived and in 1982, he moved to Australia, where he found work as a carpenter. In 1989, he briefly returned to England to visit his ailing mother.

In 2006, he attended a Genesis convention in London (along with Anthony Phillips and Steve Hackett), and played drums for tribute band ReGenesis's performance of "The Knife". The same year, Genesis's management gave him all the royalties which had accumulated from sales of Trespass during the time when his whereabouts were unknown.

== Death ==
On 26 March 2009, Mayhew died of a heart condition in Glasgow, Scotland on the eve of his 62nd birthday. He had been working as a carpenter for a furniture company at the time of his death.
