= Chris Stewart (author) =

British author based in Spain

- Born: 27 March 1951 (age 75); Crawley, England
- Education: The Abbey School Ashurst Wood, and Charterhouse School
- Occupations: Writer; farmer; musician
- Writing career
- Genres: Autobiography; memoir
- Subjects: Farming life in Andalucia, Spain
- Notable work: Driving Over Lemons: An Optimist in Andalucia (1999)
- Musical career
- Origin: Horsham, Sussex, United Kingdom
- Genre: Progressive rock
- Instruments: Drums, guitar
- Years active: 1965–1969
- Label: Charisma Records
- Formerly of: Genesis; Garden Wall

Christopher Stewart (born 27 March 1951) is a British author who was the original drummer and a founding member of Genesis. When not writing, he runs a farm, where he lives, near Orgiva in Spain.

== Background and musical career ==
Stewart was born in Crawley and grew up in Horsham, Sussex. He attended The Abbey School, Ashurst Wood, then later became a classmate of Tony Banks and Peter Gabriel at Charterhouse in Surrey, and joined them in a school band called the Garden Wall. This was joined by classmates Mike Rutherford and Anthony Phillips to form Anon, which was renamed Genesis in January 1967. Stewart appears on Genesis's first two singles, "The Silent Sun" / "That's Me" and "A Winter's Tale" / "One-Eyed Hound". Although several demos from Stewart's time with the band appear on the Genesis Archive 1967-75 box set, he did not play on any of them. At the recommendation of Jonathan King, Stewart was – rather inelegantly – fired from the band in the summer of 1968 due to his poor technique and was replaced by John Silver.

== Farmer and author ==
After travelling and working throughout Europe, Stewart settled and bought a farm named El Valero in the Alpujarras region of Andalucia, where he lives and works with his wife Ana Exton and daughter Chloë. He ran for the position of local councillor in the 27 May 2007 local elections in Órgiva representing the Green Party, where he received 201 votes (roughly 8 per cent).

He is now known for his autobiographical books, Driving Over Lemons: An Optimist in Andalucia (1999, ISBN 0-9535227-0-9) and the sequels, A Parrot in the Pepper Tree (2002, ISBN 0-9535227-5-X) and The Almond Blossom Appreciation Society (2006, ISBN 0-9548995-0-4), about his life farming in Spain. All three are also available as audiobooks (Lemons ISBN 0-14-180143-3, Parrot ISBN 0-14-180402-5, and Almond ISBN 0-7528-8597-9), narrated by Stewart.

In 2009, Stewart's publisher, Sort of Books, announced plans to release his memoir focused on sailing, entitled Three Ways to Capsize a Boat: An Optimist Afloat. This was fulfilled as ISBN 978-0956003812.

In 2014, Sort of Books published Stewart's book of stories, Last Days of the Bus Club (4 June 2014, ISBN 978-1-908745-43-9), which focuses on his daughter's going to university, and his and Ana's subsequent life alone on the farm. Stewart has also contributed to two books in the Rough Guides series: the Rough Guide to Andalucia and the Rough Guide to China.
