= Orchestral pop =

Pop music with orchestras

- Other names: Symphonic pop; chamber pop
- Stylistic origins: Pop music; symphonic orchestra
- Cultural origins: 1960s, United States and United Kingdom
- Derivative forms: Baroque pop; Shibuya-kei

Other topics
- Chamber pop; easy-listening; pops orchestra; progressive pop; studio orchestra; operatic pop

Orchestral pop is pop music that has been arranged and performed by a symphonic orchestra. It is sometimes used interchangeably with the terms symphonic pop and chamber pop.

== History ==
During the 1960s, pop music on radio and in both American and British film moved away from refined Tin Pan Alley to more eccentric songwriting and incorporated reverb-drenched rock guitar, symphonic strings, and horns played by groups of properly arranged and rehearsed studio musicians. The rapid development of multitrack recording in the mid 1960s also drove the ability of producers to create recordings with ever more complex and sonically sophisticated arrangements. Pop arrangers and producers worked orchestral pop into their artists' releases, including George Martin and his strings arrangements with the Beatles, and John Barry for his scores to the James Bond films. Also in the 1960s, a number of orchestral settings were made for songs written by the Beatles, including symphonic performances of "Yesterday" by orchestras. Some symphonies were specifically founded for playing predominantly popular music, such as the Boston Pops Orchestra. Nick Perito was one of orchestral pop's most accomplished arrangers, composers, and conductors.

According to Chris Nickson, the "vital orchestral pop of 1966" was "challenging, rather than vapid, easy listening". Spin magazine refers to Burt Bacharach and the Beach Boys' Brian Wilson as "gods" of orchestral pop. In Nickson's opinion, the "apex" of orchestral pop lay in singer Scott Walker, explaining that "in his most fertile period, 1967–70, he created a body of work that was, in its own way, as revolutionary as the Beatles'. He took the ideas of [Henry] Mancini and Bacharach to their logical conclusion, essentially redefining the concept of orchestral pop."

In the 21st century, few artists explore the genre, with the most notable being English supergroup The Last Shadow Puppets (formed by Arctic Monkeys frontman, Alex Turner and solo artist Miles Kane), American artist Cody Fry, American artist Amadour and Korean artist IU.

== Ork-pop ==
Ork-pop is a 1990s movement which took its name from orchestral pop. Leading artists of the movement included Yum-Yum, The High Llamas, Richard Davies, Eric Matthews, Spookey Ruben, Witch Hazel, and Liam Hayes (Plush). Matthews, who partnered with Davies for duo Cardinal, was considered a leading figure in the style.

== Bibliography ==
- Hawkins, Stan (2015). Queerness in Pop Music: Aesthetics, Gender Norms, and Temporality. Routledge. ISBN 978-1-317-58972-3.
- Lanza, Joseph; et al. (2008). DJ Spooky That Subliminal Kid (ed.). Sound Unbound:Sampling Digital Music and Culture. MIT Press. ISBN 978-0-262-26646-8.
- Lanza, Joseph (1994). Elevator Music: a Surreal History of Muzak, Easy-Listening, and Other Moodsong. St. Martin's. ISBN 0-312-10540-1.
