= Genesis Archive 1967–75 =

Box set by Genesis
- Released: 22 June 1998
- Recorded: 1967–1975, 1995
- Genres: Progressive rock; art rock; psychedelic rock; psychedelic pop; baroque pop
- Length: 250:43
- Labels: Virgin (UK) CD BOX 6 Atlantic (US)
- Producers: Genesis, Nick Davis, Geoff Callingham

Genesis chronology
Calling All Stations (1997)	Genesis Archive 1967–75 (1998)	Turn It On Again: The Hits (1999)

Professional ratings
Review scores
Source	Rating
AllMusic	4/5 stars
Entertainment Weekly	B
The Rolling Stone Album Guide	3/5 stars

Genesis Archive 1967–75 is a box set by the English progressive rock band Genesis, released on 22 June 1998 on Virgin Records in the United Kingdom and by Atlantic Records in the United States. After the release of their studio album Calling All Stations in 1997, the band assembled recordings from their history for release which involved the participation of former members Peter Gabriel, Anthony Phillips, Steve Hackett, Phil Collins, John Mayhew, and John Silver. The set includes previously unreleased studio, live, and demo tracks, some of which include re-recorded vocal and guitar parts from Gabriel and Hackett, respectively.

Genesis Archive 1967–75 reached No. 35 in the UK.

== Background ==
Discs one and two contain the first official live release of a full concert from the band's 1974–1975 tour of The Lamb Lies Down on Broadway (1974). It was recorded on 24 January 1975 at the Shrine Auditorium in Los Angeles, and the only one of the tour's 102 dates to be recorded in multi-track. Some of the tracks from the concert have newly recorded vocals from Gabriel and guitar parts from Hackett, partly due to Gabriel's more elaborate costumes often muffling his voice. The closing song "It" is a re-worked studio version with new vocals, as the recording used as a source for the release had ended early due to the recorder at the concert having run out of tape. The concert was also recorded by the King Biscuit Flower Hour and was broadcast on the radio in its entirety in 1975. Bootlegs of this recording have been circulating among collectors since that time.

Discs three and four contain previously unreleased live tracks from 1973, demos, single edits, and a BBC radio session from 1970, the latter disc featuring the band's early drummers John Silver and John Mayhew. They also include "Happy the Man", a song which Genesis, after playing it live since at least March 1971, recorded in March 1972 for release as a single only, thinking it could be a hit. (Another song similarly intended to be a non-album single, "Wooden Mask", was recorded during this period, but it was never released and the recording has since been lost.) "Twilight Alehouse" was recorded for the Foxtrot sessions but rejected for that release, later becoming the B-side to "I Know What I Like (In Your Wardrobe)". The set is packaged with an 80-page booklet and extensive liner notes.

To promote the release, Banks, Gabriel, Rutherford, Phillips, Silver, Collins, and Hackett gathered at Heathrow Business Centre on 11 May 1998 for a photograph shoot and interviews. Only original drummer Chris Stewart and Mayhew, Silver's replacement, were missing from the event.

== Track listing ==
All songs written by Tony Banks, Phil Collins, Peter Gabriel, Steve Hackett, and Mike Rutherford, except where noted.

Disc one
No.	Title	Information	Length
1.	"The Lamb Lies Down on Broadway"	All tracks recorded on 24 January 1975 at the Shrine Auditorium, Los Angeles	6:29
2.	"Fly on a Windshield"		2:54
3.	"Broadway Melody of 1974"		2:19
4.	"Cuckoo Cocoon"		2:17
5.	"In the Cage"		7:56
6.	"The Grand Parade of Lifeless Packaging"		4:25
7.	"Back in N.Y.C."		6:19
8.	"Hairless Heart"		2:22
9.	"Counting Out Time"		4:00
10.	"The Carpet Crawlers"		5:45
11.	"The Chamber of 32 Doors"		5:52

Disc two
No.	Title	Information	Length
1.	"Lilywhite Lilith"	All tracks except track 12 recorded on 24 January 1975 at the Shrine Auditorium, Los Angeles	3:04
2.	"The Waiting Room"		6:15
3.	"Anyway"		3:28
4.	"Here Comes the Supernatural Anaesthetist"		3:57
5.	"The Lamia"		7:12
6.	"Silent Sorrow in Empty Boats"		3:15
7.	"The Colony of Slippermen": a. "The Arrival"; b. "A Visit to the Doktor"; c. "The Raven"		8:47
8.	"Ravine"		1:39
9.	"The Light Dies Down on Broadway"		3:37
10.	"Riding the Scree"		4:30
11.	"In the Rapids"		2:25
12.	"it"	New remixed studio version with new re-recorded vocals and guitar	4:20

Disc three
No.	Title	Writer(s)	Information	Length
1.	"Dancing with the Moonlit Knight"		Tracks 1–5 recorded on 20 October 1973 at the Rainbow Theatre, London	7:05
2.	"Firth of Fifth"			8:29
3.	"More Fool Me"			4:01
4.	"Supper's Ready"		Includes new re-recorded vocals and guitar	26:31
5.	"I Know What I Like (In Your Wardrobe)"			5:36
6.	"Stagnation"	Banks, Gabriel, Anthony Phillips, Rutherford	Recorded on 10 May 1971 for the BBC radio show Sounds of the 70s	8:52
7.	"Twilight Alehouse"	Banks, Gabriel, Phillips, Rutherford	B-side to "I Know What I Like (In Your Wardrobe)" single, released February 1974	7:45
8.	"Happy the Man"		A-side single, released May 1972	2:53
9.	"Watcher of the Skies"		A-side single re-recorded with an alternate ending, released February 1973	3:42

Disc four
No.	Title	Writer(s)	Information	Length
1.	"In the Wilderness"	Banks, Gabriel, Phillips, Rutherford	Rough mix without strings, 1968	3:00
2.	"Shepherd"	Banks, Gabriel, Phillips, Rutherford	Recorded on 22 February 1970 for the BBC radio show Night Ride	4:00
3.	"Pacidy"	Banks, Gabriel, Phillips, Rutherford	Recorded on 22 February 1970	5:42
4.	"Let Us Now Make Love"	Banks, Gabriel, Phillips, Rutherford	Recorded on 22 February 1970	6:14
5.	"Going Out to Get You"	Banks, Gabriel, Phillips, Rutherford	20 August 1969 demo at Regent Sound Studio	4:54
6.	"Dusk"	Banks, Gabriel, Phillips, Rutherford	20 August 1969 demo at Regent Sound Studio	6:14
7.	"Build Me a Mountain"	Banks, Gabriel, Phillips, Rutherford	August 1968 rough mix	4:13
8.	"Image Blown Out"	Banks, Gabriel, Phillips, Rutherford	August 1968 rough mix	2:12
9.	"One Day"	Banks, Gabriel, Phillips, Rutherford	August 1968 rough mix	3:08
10.	"Where the Sour Turns to Sweet"	Banks, Gabriel, Phillips, Rutherford	1968 demo	3:14
11.	"In the Beginning"	Banks, Gabriel, Phillips, Rutherford	1968 demo	3:31
12.	"The Magic of Time"	Banks, Gabriel, Phillips, Rutherford	1968 demo	2:01
13.	"Hey!"	Banks, Gabriel, Phillips, Rutherford	13 March 1968 demo	2:28
14.	"Hidden in the World of Dawn"	Banks, Gabriel, Phillips, Rutherford	1968 demo	3:10
15.	"Sea Bee"	Banks, Gabriel, Phillips, Rutherford	1968 demo	3:05
16.	"The Mystery of the Flannan Isle Lighthouse"	Banks, Gabriel, Phillips, Rutherford	1968 demo	2:36
17.	"Hair on the Arms and Legs"	Banks, Gabriel, Phillips, Rutherford	1968 demo	2:42
18.	"She is Beautiful"	Banks, Gabriel, Phillips, Rutherford	1967 demo, became "The Serpent" with different lyrics	3:47
19.	"Try a Little Sadness"	Banks, Gabriel, Phillips, Rutherford	1967 demo	3:21
20.	"Patricia"	Banks, Gabriel, Phillips, Rutherford	1967 demo, became "In Hiding" with lyrics	3:05

== Personnel ==
- Peter Gabriel - lead vocals, backing vocals, flute, percussion, drums ("Patricia")
- Tony Banks - piano, organ, electric piano, Mellotron, synthesizer, 12-string guitar, backing vocals, 2nd lead vocal ("Shepherd")
- Mike Rutherford - bass guitar, 12-string guitar, bass pedals, backing vocals
- Steve Hackett - lead guitar (Discs 1–3)
- Phil Collins - drums, percussion, vocals (Discs 1–3), lead vocals ("More Fool Me")
- Anthony Phillips - guitars, backing vocals (Disc 4), 2nd lead vocal ("Let Us Now Make Love")
- John Mayhew - drums (Disc 4, tracks 3–6)
- John Silver - drums (Disc 4, tracks 1, 7, 8, 12), biscuit tin (Disc 4, track 12)

== Additional musicians ==
- David Thomas - backing vocals (Disc 4, track 12)
- unknown (most likely Richard MacPhail) - drums (Disc 4, track 13)

== Charts ==
Chart (1998)	Peak position
German Albums (Offizielle Top 100)	75
Scottish Albums (Official Charts)	73
UK Albums (Official Charts)	35
