= Genesis Movie Box 1981–2007 =

Genesis The Movie Box 1981–2007

Box set by Genesis
- Released: 16 November 2009 (UK); 23 November 2009 (US)
- Recorded: 1981–2007
- Genres: Progressive rock, pop rock, soft rock
- Labels: Virgin (UK); Atlantic/Rhino (US)
- Producer: various

Genesis chronology
Genesis Live 1973–2007 (2009)	Genesis The Movie Box 1981–2007 (2009)	R-Kive (2014)

Professional ratings
Review scores
Source	Rating
Mojo	3/5 stars

Genesis The Movie Box 1981–2007 is a box set by Genesis which includes the following DVDs:

- Three Sides Live (1981), released before on Betamax, VHS and LaserDisc only;
- The Mama Tour (1984), released before on Betamax, VHS and LaserDisc only; featuring "The Making of the Mama Album", a home video filmed by Phil Collins during the making of Genesis.
- Live at Wembley Stadium (1987);
- The Way We Walk (1992),
- bonus disc containing an updated version of a VH1 Behind The Music documentary about Genesis, which originally aired in 1999, all containing new 2009 5.1 mixes in DTS and Dolby Digital.

The box also has an empty jewel case to hold the discs of When in Rome 2007.

== Contents ==
=== Three Sides Live ===
1. "Behind the Lines"
2. "Duchess"
3. "Misunderstanding"
4. "Dodo/Lurker"
5. "Abacab"
6. "No Reply at All"
7. "Who Dunnit?"
8. "In the Cage Medley" ("In the Cage" / "The Cinema Show" / "The Colony of Slippermen")
9. "Afterglow"
10. "Me and Sarah Jane" (filmed at the Savoy)
11. "Man on the Corner" (filmed at the Savoy)
12. "Turn It On Again"

Audio-only 5.1 full-length versions:

1. "Behind the Lines"
2. "Duchess"
3. "Me and Sarah Jane"
4. "Man on the Corner"
5. "One for the Vine"
6. "Fountain of Salmacis"
7. "Follow You, Follow Me"

=== The Mama Tour ===
1. "Abacab"
2. "That's All"
3. "Mama"
4. "Illegal Alien"
5. "Home by the Sea"
6. "Second Home by the Sea"
7. "Keep It Dark"
8. "It's Gonna Get Better"
9. "In the Cage"/"The Cinema Show"/"...In That Quiet Earth"/"The Colony of Slippermen"
10. "Afterglow"
11. "Drum Duet"
12. "Turn It On Again – Final Medley"

=== Genesis Live at Wembley Stadium ===
1. "Mama"
2. "Abacab"
3. "Domino"
4. "That's All"
5. "The Brazilian"
6. "Land of Confusion"
7. "Tonight, Tonight, Tonight"
8. "Throwing It All Away"
9. "Home by the Sea / Second Home by the Sea"
10. "Invisible Touch"
11. Drum Duet
12. "Los Endos"
13. "Turn It On Again" – medley

=== The Way We Walk ===
Released as a 2-DVD set in 2001, the 2009 edition was reduced to a single disc by removing the multi-angle feature, interviews and galleries present on the original version.

1. "Land of Confusion"
2. "No Son of Mine"
3. "Driving the Last Spike"
4. "Old Medley":
  1. "Dance on a Volcano"
  2. "The Lamb Lies Down on Broadway"
  3. "The Musical Box (closing section)"
  4. "Firth of Fifth"
  5. "I Know What I Like"
5. "Fading Lights"
6. "Jesus He Knows Me"
7. "Dreaming While You Sleep"
8. "Home by the Sea/Second Home by the Sea"
9. "Hold on My Heart"
10. "Domino"
11. "The Drum Thing"
12. "I Can't Dance"
13. "Tonight, Tonight, Tonight"
14. "Invisible Touch"
15. "Turn It On Again"

=== When in Rome 2007 ===
The When in Rome 2007 film is not included in the box, but an empty jewel case, with artwork, is provided for those who had already purchased the DVD to insert it if they so wished. The jewel case can hold only the concert discs; the third DVD (the Come Rain or Shine documentary) can be housed in an empty pocket in the book.
