= Three Sides Live (film) =

1982 film

- Directed by: Stuart Orme
- Release date: June 1982
- Running time: 131 minutes
- Language: English

Three Sides Live is a 1982 concert film featuring the English rock band Genesis. It was released in support of the band's same-titled live double album released in June 1982. Directed by Stuart Orme, the film features live performances from two shows during the band's 1981 tour of Europe and North America in support of their studio album Abacab. The shows are from 28 and 29 November 1981 at The Savoy (now the Hudson Theatre) and Nassau Coliseum, New York, respectively. The film includes interviews footage shot backstage and the group travelling with the crew and families. Some of the featured songs are incomplete due to editing.

Three Sides Live was released in 1982 for Betamax and VHS, followed by a laserdisc release in October 1991. It was released on DVD with 5.1 surround sound in November 2009 as part of the band's concert film box set Genesis Movie Box 1981–2007. It was released on Blu-ray on 4 November 2014 after a duplicate of the original 16mm film was restored.

== Track listing ==
1. "Behind the Lines"
2. "Duchess"
3. "Misunderstanding"
4. "Dodo/Lurker"
5. "Abacab"
6. "No Reply at All"
7. "Who Dunnit?"
8. "In the Cage Medley" ("In the Cage" / "The Cinema Show" / "The Colony of Slippermen")
9. "Afterglow"
10. "Me and Sarah Jane" (filmed at the Savoy)
11. "Man on the Corner" (filmed at the Savoy)
12. "Turn It On Again"

Audio-only 5.1 full-length versions on DVD/BD releases:

1. "Behind the Lines"
2. "Duchess"
3. "Me and Sarah Jane"
4. "Man on the Corner"
5. "One for the Vine"
6. "Fountain of Salmacis"
7. "Follow You, Follow Me"

== Personnel ==
- Tony Banks – keyboards, background vocals
- Mike Rutherford – bass, guitar, background vocals, drums on "Who Dunnit?"
- Phil Collins – lead vocals, drums, percussion

Additional personnel

- Daryl Stuermer – guitar, bass
- Chester Thompson – drums, percussion
