= Paperlate =

Single by Genesis

from the album Three Sides Live
- B-side: "You Might Recall"
- Released: May 1982
- Recorded: May–June 1981
- Genre: Pop rock
- Length: 3:20
- Label: Charisma (UK), Atlantic (US)
- Songwriters: Tony Banks, Phil Collins, Mike Rutherford
- Producer: Genesis

Genesis singles chronology
"Man on the Corner" (1982)	"Paperlate" (1982)	"Mama" (1983)

"Paperlate" is a song by the English rock band Genesis from their second of two EPs. The EP, titled 3×3 (for it featured three tracks and the band comprised three musicians), peaked at No. 10 on the UK Singles Chart in mid-1982. The success of the EP led to an appearance on Top of the Pops. In the U.S. and Europe outside the UK, "Paperlate" was released as a standard single, backed by "You Might Recall". It was also featured on the U.S. version of the band's Three Sides Live album, of which all three tracks from the 3×3 EP are included on side four.

== History ==
The title came from a line in the 1973 Genesis song "Dancing with the Moonlit Knight" ("Paper late, cried a voice in the crowd"), which Genesis rehearsed at a soundcheck, leading to the conception of the song. "Paperlate" is one of two Genesis songs that features the Earth, Wind & Fire horn section, the other being "No Reply at All", also from the Abacab sessions. Phil Collins has often hired the group for other projects, including his debut solo album, Face Value. A music video was also created, utilising the band's 27 May 1982 appearance on Top of the Pops.

== Release and reception ==
"Paperlate" was the lead song from 3x3, released in the United Kingdom by Charisma Records in May 1982. The cover artwork is a homage to the design of The Beatles' 1963 Twist and Shout EP, with both also including liner notes written by Tony Barrow.

"Paperlate" debuted at No. 30 on the UK charts, peaking at No. 10 later on. In the United States, "Paperlate" was released by Atlantic Records. By the week of 4 June 1982, 71 percent of album oriented rock radio stations in the United States reporting to Radio & Records had included the song on their playlists. The song peaked at No. 32 on the Billboard Hot 100 chart and No. 2 on the Top Rock Tracks chart. It also reached No. 36 on the German charts.

Upon its release, Billboard said that Collins' "ripe and thundering vocals" were "straight-forward pop/rock lures" and highlighted the "flashy" horn section. Cash Box noted a resemblance to Collins' solo single "I Missed Again".

Retrospectively, Dave Thompson of AllMusic said that "Paperlate" was 3×3's selling point, and describes the song as "a horn-honking romp with just the ghosts of '60s soul playing around its chorus and a buoyancy that fed readily into the mood of the U.K. charts of the day." Dw. Dunphy of Popdose commented that while catchy and enjoyable, "Paperlate" is "a definite cousin to 'No Reply At All', both songs employing the same tempo, attitude, and the Earth, Wind, and Fire horn section."

== Personnel ==
- Tony Banks – keyboards
- Phil Collins – drums, percussion, vocals
- Mike Rutherford – guitar, bass

Additional musicians

- EWF Horns – horns

== Chart performance ==
Chart (1982)	Peak position
Australia (Kent Music Report)	73
Canada Top Singles (RPM)	25
Netherlands (Single Top 100)	40
UK Singles (Official Charts)	10
US Billboard Hot 100	32
US Mainstream Rock (Billboard)	2
West Germany (GfK)	36
