= 3×3 =

EP by Genesis
- Released: 10 May 1982
- Recorded: May–June 1981
- Genre: Pop rock
- Length: 15:10
- Label: Charisma (UK)
- Producer: Genesis

Genesis chronology
Abacab (1981)	3×3 (1982)	Three Sides Live (1982)

Genesis EP chronology
Spot the Pigeon (1977)	3×3 (1982)

3×3 is the second extended play by the English rock band Genesis, released on 10 May 1982 on Charisma Records. Its three songs were originally written and recorded for their eleventh studio album Abacab (1981), but they were not included on the album's final track selection. 3×3 reached No. 10 on the UK Singles Chart. In the US, its tracks were included on the international edition of the band's live album Three Sides Live (1982). The lead track, "Paperlate", peaked at No. 32 on the US Billboard Hot 100 singles chart and No. 2 on the Billboard Mainstream Rock Tracks chart.

== Production ==
All songs were recorded during the sessions for Abacab. A bootleg demo tape exists of the band playing an entire session of songs for Abacab, with the three songs from this EP also included.

For the song "Paperlate", Collins used the horn section of the band Earth, Wind & Fire. Collins has often used the group for other projects, including Collins' debut solo album, Face Value. A music video was also created utilizing the band's 27 May 1982 appearance on Top of the Pops. According to "Connolly & Company", "You Might Recall" is a song about a lost love. Collins wrote the song "Me and Virgil" in the form of a story (a technique he would return to with the 10-minute epic "Driving the Last Spike" on 1991's We Can't Dance). He has called the song "a dog", and cites "Me and Virgil" as one of his worst ever pieces of writing. According to Collins, the group was trying to do something similar to the work of The Band, but "we couldn't."

Me and Virgil was played live by the band at the first two nights of the Abacab Tour in Barcelona and San Sebastian. Paperlate was played on the 1982 Encore tour in support of the Three Sides Live album. The EWF horns joined Genesis on stage to play Paperlate and No Reply at All in Los Angeles and New York.

== Packaging and artwork ==
Collins stated that the packaging for 3×3 was a throwback to The Beatles' first EP release in 1963, entitled Twist and Shout. The front cover photo is similar to the Beatles' EP cover. The liner notes and design of the back cover were done by the man who was in charge of designing the Beatles' EP, Tony Barrow. "these cheeky chappies from Guildford ... treasure these three audio-visual representations..." are parts that Phil recalls. The title itself is also a nod to The Rolling Stones, who released both an EP titled Five by Five and an LP entitled 12 X 5. Collins recalls that the album's cover and interior text received negative reviews from a reviewer who was not alive when the original Beatles EP was released, thereby misunderstanding the parody.

== Critical reception ==
Professional ratings
Review scores
Source	Rating
AllMusic	3/5 stars

The response to the EP was mixed. Dave Thompson of AllMusic gives it three stars out of five, citing "Paperlate" as the EP's selling point. Thompson describes "Paperlate" as "a horn-honking romp with just the ghosts of '60s soul playing around its chorus and a buoyancy that fed readily into the mood of the UK charts of the day." Thompson called "You Might Recall" and "Me and Virgil" "somewhat calmer", describing "Me and Virgil" as "introspective" and "You Might Recall" as "the latest in the band's long line of bubbly romantic numbers."

Connolly & Company says that "Paperlate" featured a "peppy horn section," and that "You Might Recall" "recalled Mike Rutherford's earlier contributions ("Alone Tonight", "Say It's Alright Joe")." Connolly also says that Three Sides Live was worth buying for just "Paperlate".

Upon its release, 3×3's lead song was "Paperlate", and the EP debuted at No. 30 on the UK charts, peaking at No. 10 later on. Because the EP market never took off in North America, Atlantic Records instead initially decided to release its three songs as part of the fourth side of Three Sides Live, while in the UK that side featured more live music. "Paperlate" peaked at No. 32 on the U.S. Billboard Hot 100, and No. 2 on the Billboard Rock Tracks chart. As of 1994, however, Three Sides Live was remastered and reissued with the extra live material internationally.

== Later releases ==
3×3 never saw a CD release. However, its tracks appeared on the world edition of Three Sides Live. The three tracks, plus the songs "Evidence of Autumn" and "Open Door" (B-sides from the Duke sessions) make up the non-live side 2 of the second LP. In addition, two of its three tracks, "Paperlate" and "You Might Recall", appeared on the box set Genesis Archive 2: 1976-1992 (2000); however, "Me and Virgil" was not added due to Collins' dislike for the song. The track was made available on the bonus CD of the boxed set Genesis 1976-1982, in a modern-day remixed version. The original mix remains out of print. "Paperlate" was also issued as a B-side to the single "Tonight, Tonight, Tonight".

== Track listing ==
All songs by Tony Banks, Phil Collins, and Mike Rutherford.

=== Side A ===
No.	Title	Length
1.	"Paperlate"	3:20
2.	"You Might Recall"	5:30
Total length:		8:50

=== Side B ===
No.	Title	Length
1.	"Me and Virgil"	6:18

== Personnel ==
- Tony Banks – keyboards
- Phil Collins – drums, percussion, vocals
- Mike Rutherford – guitars, bass

Additional musicians

- EWF Horns – horns on "Paperlate"

Additional personnel

- Hugh Padgham – engineer
