= Keep It Dark =

Single by Genesis

from the album Abacab
- B-side: "Naminanu"
- Released: 23 October 1981
- Recorded: 1981
- Studio: The Farm (Chiddingfold, Surrey)
- Genre: Rock; new wave
- Length: 4:32
- Label: Charisma; Phonogram
- Songwriters: Tony Banks; Phil Collins; Mike Rutherford
- Producers: Genesis; Hugh Padgham

Genesis singles chronology
| "No Reply at All" (1981) | "Keep It Dark" (1981) | "Man on the Corner" (1982) |

Music video
- "Keep It Dark" on YouTube

"Keep It Dark" is a song by the English rock band Genesis, released on 23 October 1981 in the UK as the second single from their eleventh studio album Abacab (1981). It peaked at No. 33 on the UK singles chart.

== Song information ==
"Keep It Dark" describes a man who has been to the future and has seen a bright, happy world where everyone is filled with joy, cities are filled with light, with no fear of war, and all exploitation has ceased as all creatures have happier lives. Once he returns, however, he is pressured to lie about the incident. The cover depicts the Japanese pictorial maxim three wise monkeys, embodying the proverbial principle "see no evil, hear no evil, speak no evil".

In the DVD interview accompanying the 2007 re-release of Abacab, the album from which the song comes, composer Tony Banks said that "the idea was that this character had to pretend that he'd just been robbed by people and that's why he'd disappeared for a few weeks, and in fact what had happened [was] he'd been to the future and gone to this fantastic world where everything was wonderful and beautiful and everything... but he couldn't tell anybody that, because no one would believe him and the powers that be kept him silent."

The song's unusual structure (the rhythm is in a 6/4 time signature) kept it from being released as a single in the US.

== Music video ==
A music video supported the single release of the song, featuring Phil Collins, Tony Banks, and Mike Rutherford in two different settings. In the first and second verses and the fade out, the band walks along bleak city streets (in Amsterdam) wearing trench coats and fedoras. When the chorus comes in, it shifts to the band wearing all-white suits and sunglasses, and walking through a field, with the sun shining. In both settings, Banks mimes with a mini Casio keyboard and Rutherford with the neck from a guitar, while Collins keeps the beat of the song with drumsticks, mostly hitting air, or the walls of the Amsterdam houses.

== Credits ==
Genesis

- Tony Banks – keyboards
- Phil Collins – drums, percussion, vocals
- Mike Rutherford – electric guitar, bass pedals
