= Three Sides Live =

Live album by Genesis
- Released: 4 June 1982
- Recorded: 1976–1981 in various locations
- Genres: Progressive rock; art rock; pop rock
- Length: 92:42
- Labels: Charisma; Atlantic
- Producer: Genesis

Genesis chronology
3×3 (1982)	Three Sides Live (1982)	Genesis (1983)

Singles from Three Sides Live
- 1. "Paperlate" Released: May 1982; 2. "Turn It On Again" Released: 1982 (EU)

Three Sides Live is the third live album by the English rock band Genesis, released as a double album on 4 June 1982 on Charisma Records in the United Kingdom. It was released by Atlantic Records in the United States. After touring in support of their studio album Abacab ended in December 1981 the band entered an eight-month break in activity, during which they selected recordings from their previous tours for a live album. Three Sides Live includes recordings between 1976 and 1981; the UK edition contains additional live tracks on the fourth side of the double LP, while the original international edition featured tracks from their 1982 EP 3×3 and B-sides from Duke. Subsequent international reissues have adopted the UK track sequence.

Three Sides Live received a mostly positive critical reception and was a commercial success, peaking at No. 2 on the UK Albums Chart and No. 10 on the US Billboard 200, where it sold 500,000 copies. Its release coincided with the band's Three Sides Live concert film. It was remastered in 1994 and 2009, the latter for their Genesis Live 1973–2007 box set.

== Background ==
In December 1981, Genesis wrapped their four-month tour of Europe and North America to support the release of their eleventh studio album, Abacab (1981). The band then entered an eight-month break in activity, during which they each pursued solo projects and selected recordings from their previous tours for inclusion on a new live album. All editions of Three Sides Live contain recordings from their 1980 and 1981 tours across the first three sides. The fourth side of the UK edition contains additional live tracks from 1976, 1978, and 1980, while the international edition contains tracks from the group's second EP 3×3 (1982) – "Paperlate", "You Might Recall", and "Me and Virgil" and two B-sides recorded during the sessions for Duke (1980) – "Open Door" and "Evidence of Autumn".

== Release ==
Three Sides Live reached No. 2 in the UK and No. 10 in the US. It was certified silver and gold by the British Phonographic Industry (BPI) on 14 June 1982, the latter for 100,000 copies sold. In the United States, the album was certified gold by the Recording Industry Association of America (RIAA) on 4 October 1982 for 500,000 copies sold.

=== Reception ===
Professional ratings
Review scores
Source	Rating
AllMusic	3.5/5 stars
Rolling Stone	3/5 stars
The Rolling Stone Album Guide	3/5 stars

Rolling Stone gave the album a rave review, particularly praising Genesis's advancement to more refined and concise material: "Unlike Seconds Out, where the concert versions of Genesis' songs were shrouded in virtuosic bluster, this album offers incisive, sharply focused performances uncluttered by theatrics or instrumental tedium." AllMusic's retrospective review asserted that the performances were impressive and exciting throughout, delivering nothing but "lean, crisp, and generally bracing accounts of the group's then-current sound."

In a review published in Record Mirror by Robin Smith, the album received a mixed response. The atmosphere he experienced in concert at one of their Wembley Arena gigs in 1981 was absent from the album, which he deemed "hardly a sparkling addition" to the Genesis catalogue. Smith attributed this to the song selection and it being recorded with "less than inspired audiences". He praised the performances of "Dodo/Lurker", "Behind the Lines", "Duchess", but picked the third and fourth side as stand out tracks. Smith concluded that he would be listening to Seconds Out, the band's second live album, "for years to come".

=== Reissues ===
In 1994, Three Sides Live was remastered and reissued with the UK edition worldwide. Four of the five additional studio selections from that out of print release were issued in 2000 on the Genesis Archive 2: 1976–1992 box set (all but "Me And Virgil"), and all five songs have since been included on the bonus disc of the Genesis 1976–1982 box set.

== Track listing ==
Track listing is adapted from the album's 1982 liner notes.

Side one
No.	Title	Writer(s)	Recording date and location	Length
1.	"Turn It On Again"	Tony Banks, Phil Collins, Mike Rutherford	29 November 1981 at Nassau Coliseum, Uniondale, New York	5:16
2.	"Dodo"/"Lurker"	Banks, Collins, Rutherford	23 December 1981 at National Exhibition Centre, Birmingham, England	7:19
3.	"Abacab"	Banks, Collins, Rutherford	23 December 1981	8:47

Side two
No.	Title	Writer(s)	Recording date and location	Length
1.	"Behind the Lines"	Banks, Collins, Rutherford	29 November 1981	5:26
2.	"Duchess"	Banks, Collins, Rutherford	29 November 1981	6:43
3.	"Me & Sarah Jane"	Banks	29 November 1981	5:59
4.	"Follow You Follow Me"	Banks, Collins, Rutherford	7 May 1980 at Lyceum Theatre, London	4:58

Side three
No.	Title	Writer(s)	Recording date and location	Length
1.	"Misunderstanding"	Collins	28 November 1981 at The Savoy in New York City	4:06
2.	"In the Cage (Medley – Cinema Show – Slippermen) (Note: The track is a medley of "In the Cage", "The Cinema Show", "Riding the Scree", and "Raven")"	Banks, Collins, Peter Gabriel, Steve Hackett, Rutherford	23 December 1981	11:53
3.	"Afterglow"	Banks	23 December 1981	5:14

Side four (original UK edition)
No.	Title	Writer(s)	Recording date and location	Length
1.	"One for the Vine"	Banks	5 May 1980 at Theatre Royal, Drury Lane, London	11:04 (Note: On some editions, "One for the Vine" is incorrectly divided into two separate tracks, leaving the second part titled as "The Fountain of Salmacis", while "The Fountain of Salmacis" and "it./Watcher of the Skies" follow as a single track.)
2.	"The Fountain of Salmacis"	Banks, Collins, Gabriel, Hackett, Rutherford	22 October 1978 at The Summit, Houston, Texas	8:37
3.	"it."/"Watcher of the Skies"	Banks, Collins, Gabriel, Hackett, Rutherford	9 July 1976 at Apollo Theatre, Glasgow, Scotland	7:22

Side four (US/Japanese/European editions)
No.	Title	Writer(s)	Source	Length
1.	"Paperlate"	Banks, Collins, Rutherford	3×3 (1982)	3:20
2.	"You Might Recall"	Banks, Collins, Rutherford	3×3	5:31
3.	"Me and Virgil"	Banks, Collins, Rutherford	3×3	6:20
4.	"Evidence of Autumn"	Banks	"Turn It On Again" (US), "Misunderstanding" (UK)	4:57
5.	"Open Door"	Rutherford	"Duchess"	4:06

== Personnel ==
Credits are adapted from the album's 1982 liner notes.

Genesis

- Phil Collins – drums, lead vocals
- Tony Banks – keyboards, backing vocals
- Mike Rutherford – guitar, bass guitar, backing vocals
- Steve Hackett – guitar on "it."/"Watcher of the Skies"

Additional musicians

- Daryl Stuermer – guitar, bass
- Chester Thompson – drums, percussion
- Bill Bruford – drums on "it."/"Watcher of the Skies"

Production

- Genesis – production
- David Hentschel – engineering on "Follow You Follow Me", "One for the Vine", "The Fountain of Salmacis", and "it."/"Watcher of the Skies"
- Geoff Callingham – technical engineer on everything else
- Craig Schertz – sound engineer
- Bill Smith – cover
- Martyn Goddard – photography

== Charts ==
Chart (1982)	Peak position
Australian Albums (Kent Music Report)	53
Canada Top Albums/CDs (RPM)	8
Dutch Albums (Album Top 100)	6
German Albums (Offizielle Top 100)	22
Italian Albums (Musica e dischi)	12
Norwegian Albums (VG-lista)	14
Swedish Albums (Sverigetopplistan)	49
UK Albums (Official Charts)	2
US Billboard 200	10

== Certifications ==
Region	Certification	Certified units/sales
Canada (Music Canada)	Gold	50,000^{^}
United Kingdom (BPI)	Gold	100,000^{^}
United States (RIAA)	Gold	500,000^{^}
^{^} Shipments figures based on certification alone.

== Notes and references ==
Notes

Citations

Interviews

- Reding, Mal (1982). "The Mal Reding Interview Archive - Genesis frontman Phil Collins talks Three Sides Live". Mal Reding.
