= Man on the Corner =

Single by Genesis

from the album Abacab
- B-side: "Submarine"
- Released: 5 March 1982
- Recorded: 1981
- Genre: Synth-pop
- Length: 4:27 (LP version); 3:56 (Special-mix); 3:40 (U.S. single remix/edit); 3:53 (U.K. single remix/edit)
- Label: Charisma(UK); Atlantic (U.S.)
- Songwriter: Phil Collins
- Producers: Genesis, Hugh Padgham

Genesis singles chronology
"Keep It Dark" (1981)	"Man on the Corner" (1982)	"Paperlate" (1982)

"Man on the Corner" is a 1981 song by English rock band Genesis, released as a single on 5 March 1982. The song is from the band's Abacab album, and was written and sung by drummer Phil Collins. It peaked at No. 41 on the UK Singles Chart and No. 40 on the U.S. Billboard Hot 100.

== Lyrics ==
The lyrics describe a man who spends his days on a street corner, shouting at passersby. According to the radio show In the Studio with Redbeard (which spotlighted the making of the Abacab album), the song was composer Collins' first song about the homeless epidemic and society's reluctance to help the homeless or find a resolution. Near the end of the 1980s, Collins would revisit the theme of homelessness in "Another Day in Paradise".

== Music ==
Backed by a simple drum machine beat, the song takes a musically dark tone. This song makes a prominent feature of the Roland TR-808 drum machine at the beginning, then switches to a drum set during the bridge while the drum machine continues to run in the background throughout the entire song.

According to Tony Banks, this song features two tracks of Prophet-5 recorded separately in the studio, with mainly factory voices because Phil wrote the song on a stock, "un-reprogrammed" Prophet-5. The song was reproduced live on a Prophet-10 (basically two Prophet-5's in one) by allocating the different patches on each of the keyboards.

== Reception ==
Record World said that "magical keyboard and percussion sounds back Phil Collins' intense vocal solitude."

== Music video ==
The music video used to promote the song features Collins, Banks, and Rutherford, along with Daryl Stuermer and Chester Thompson playing on stage together, using different colours to illuminate the band. It was filmed during a performance at the Savoy Theatre in New York City, and uses the audio taken from this performance rather than the studio recording. This performance would also be included on the Three Sides Live film. However, when the video was included on the DVD set The Video Show the footage was dubbed over with the studio track.

== Credits ==
- Tony Banks – keyboards
- Phil Collins – lead and backing vocals, drums, Roland TR-808
- Mike Rutherford – bass guitar, guitar fills
