= Abacab =

- One of the album's four colour schemes

Studio album by Genesis
- Released: 18 September 1981
- Recorded: March–June 1981
- Studios: The Farm, Chiddingfold, Surrey
- Genres: Art rock; pop; new wave
- Length: 47:03
- Labels: Charisma UK; Atlantic US; Vertigo Europe/Japan/Australasia
- Producer: Genesis

Genesis chronology
Duke (1980)	Abacab (1981)	3×3 (1982)

Singles from Abacab
- 1. "Abacab" Released: 14 August 1981; 2. "No Reply at All" Released: September 1981; 3. "Keep It Dark" Released: 23 October 1981; 4. "Man on the Corner" Released: 5 March 1982

Abacab is the eleventh studio album by the English rock band Genesis, released on 18 September 1981 by Charisma Records. After their 1980 tour in support of their previous album, Duke (1980), the band took a break before they reconvened in 1981 to write and record a new album. Abacab is the first Genesis album recorded at The Farm, a recording studio bought by the group in Chiddingfold, Surrey. It marked the band's development from their progressive roots into more accessible and pop-oriented songs, and their conscious decision to write songs unlike their previous albums.

Abacab enjoyed a mostly positive reception from critics and was a commercial success for the band, becoming their second No. 1 LP on the UK Albums Chart and their first to reach the top ten of the US Billboard 200, peaking at No. 7. Genesis released four singles from the album, the most successful being "Abacab" and "No Reply at All". The album was certified gold in the UK and double platinum by the Recording Industry Association of America for selling two million copies in the US. The Abacab Tour visited North America and Europe in 1981, recordings from which formed most of their 1982 live album and concert video Three Sides Live. Three tracks left off the album were released on the EP 3×3. The album was reissued with a new stereo and 5.1 surround sound mix in 2007.

== Background ==
In June 1980, the Genesis line-up of drummer/singer Phil Collins, keyboardist Tony Banks and guitarist/bassist Mike Rutherford – working with touring drummer Chester Thompson and guitarist/bassist Daryl Stuermer – wrapped their 1980 tour of the United Kingdom and North America in support of their tenth album, Duke (1980). Following a period of rest, in November 1980 the trio bought Fisher Lane Farm, a farmhouse with an adjoining cowshed near Chiddingfold in Surrey, as their new private rehearsal and recording facility. In the process of remodelling the building into a studio, the trio reconvened in the farmhouse to write and rehearse new material (this initially took place in the living room), and they began recording the album in March 1981 once the studio was operational. The success of Collins's debut solo album Face Value (1981) had gained momentum by the time Abacab reached the stage of being recorded; Banks claimed it did little to alter either the Genesis album's sound or style, or Collins's relationship with him or with Rutherford, for they had been friends for a long time. Abacab was the first Genesis album since A Trick of the Tail (1976) to be recorded in England.

== Recording ==
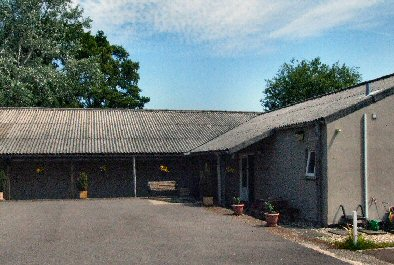
The Farm studio, pictured in 2006. Abacab was the first Genesis album to be recorded there.

Genesis recorded Abacab in 14 weeks, and they typically worked between 12 and 14 hours a day while making it. The new studio environment had a productive effect on the writing process and the band had enough material for a double album, but they shelved one hour of music because they considered the songs were too similar to their past albums. Though the band did not alter the way in which they approached the songwriting for Abacab, Banks said that a conscious effort was made by the group to avoid "Genesis cliches" such as using tambourines during a chorus, reprises, extended solos, lengthy instrumental passages, and keeping melodies simple, which signalled further changes in their direction. Because of this, Banks considered Abacab to be the least technical Genesis album at the time of its release. Rutherford said the omission of songs that were too familiar to what they had done previously was required to avoid Genesis becoming a caricature of itself, and so the change in direction was therefore necessary. He picked the songwriting periods for Duke and Abacab as a "rethink" of Genesis' approach. Collins said the group adopted what they had done for Duke and took it further for Abacab, specifically with group improvisational jams and writing with the aid of electronics such as a drum machine. The home studio allowed the group to stop working on a track if a rehearsal failed to produce any desired results and switch to another, which was not possible at a professional facility due to the limited time available.

The band's shift in direction was also underlined in their production with the departure of producer and engineer David Hentschel, who had worked with them since 1975. He was replaced by Hugh Padgham, who had worked with Collins on Face Value and former Genesis singer Peter Gabriel's third solo album which featured Collins on drums. Gabriel's track "Intruder" features a gated reverb effect on Collins's drums that Banks and Rutherford liked, and wanted Padgham to do the same on Abacab. The album marked the first time Genesis produced an album on their own, with Padgham credited as engineer. The decision to bring the drums to the forefront of a song caused Banks to change his usual approach of writing and playing, which he found exciting. Banks cut down on the block chords used (such chords had been a feature of prior albums such as ...And Then There Were Three... and Wind & Wuthering), allowing the drums more room sonically. The band praised Padgham's fresh approach to recording; Banks recalled the attractive ideas he had for recording drums, and his lack of knowledge in handling keyboards gave Banks the freedom to explore and obtain sounds that interested him. The band considered Abacab an album that closely represented their natural live sound. They produced different mixes of finished songs and selected the one they all liked best.

== Songs ==
Abacab is formed of nine tracks, six of which are group-written with the remaining three solely credited to one of each member: "Me and Sarah Jane" is from Banks, "Man on the Corner" by Collins, and "Like It or Not" by Rutherford. The group decided to have the album consist mostly of collective songs as they thought such tracks became the strongest on Duke.

=== Side one ===
"Abacab" is titled after an early ordering of the sections of music the group had for the song, which at one point spelled "ABACAB". Rutherford said that the final version of the track is not the "ABACAB" order at all, "it's like 'Accaabbaac'." The song developed from a group jam session that had them playing along to a looped electronic drum track until the tape they were using to record on ran out.

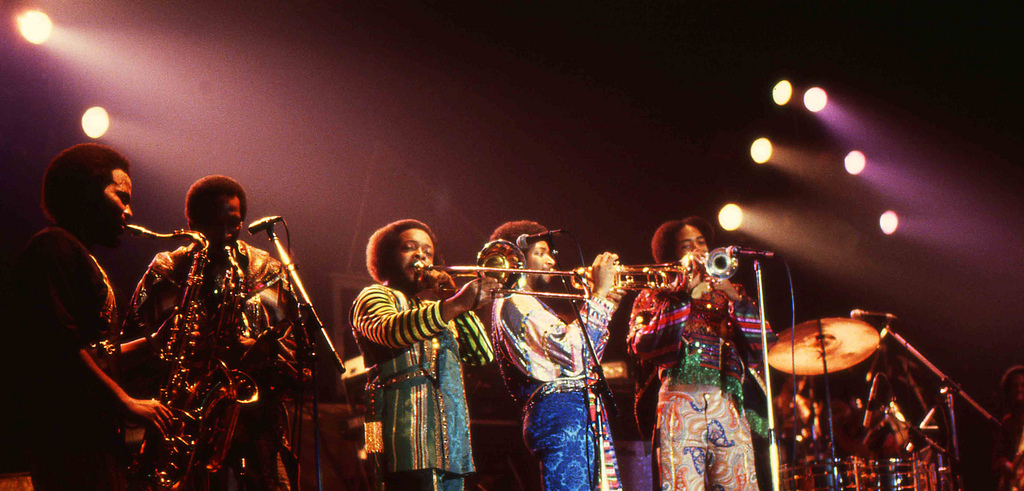
"No Reply at All" features members of the Phenix Horns.

"No Reply At All" is a rhythm-and-blues-style track that features the Phenix Horns of the American band Earth, Wind & Fire. This marked the first instance of Genesis using outside musicians for one of their tracks since a string section was used on their debut album, From Genesis To Revelation (1969). The band wanted to emulate the brass keyboard sound that was used on some parts on Duke; Collins had used the Phenix Horns on Face Value, and suggested to Banks and Rutherford that they use them for the track. Collins thought that using the horns was a good move to "suddenly jar people and take them off automatic pilot" from the preconceived notions they had about Genesis. Their involvement created some initial reservations from Banks, but he grew to enjoy the track by the time it was complete. In rehearsal, Banks played a drum machine while Rutherford and Collins played a guitar and drum part, respectively; the band played until they found ideas and sequences that worked. Collins had the idea of writing a song that the Jackson 5 would have wanted to record, and directed the band in a direction that they had never gone in before. Collins wrote the lyrics.

"Me and Sarah Jane" originated from takes that the group had recorded as early as the second day of recording.

"Keep It Dark" tells the story of a man who gets abducted to a surreal and peaceful alien planet but does not tell anyone as he thinks no one would believe him. Its original working title was "Odd", and became a favourite for Banks. It features the band taking two bars of a drum pattern previously recorded and playing the song on top of it.

=== Side two ===
"Dodo"/"Lurker" features lyrics written by Banks, who included a riddle in "Lurker". In a 1997 interview, he said: "There is no real solution [...] It was a bit of a joke [...] I honestly didn't really have a specific idea in mind." Early arrangements of the song including two songs later released as B-sides – "Naminanu" and "Submarine" – suggest that perhaps "submarines" were a basis for the lyric.

Banks described "Who Dunnit?" as a "real one-off piece". Featuring drums, guitar, and a Prophet-5 analogue synthesiser, he obtained the track's distorted keyboard sound by changing its presets as he played the notes. He pushed Collins and Rutherford to record what ideas he had for the track, to which Collins wrote a lyric. The band improvised on top of the track for 30 minutes, which was cut into a three-minute arrangement. Padgham wanted the drums on the track to sound loud and exciting, and not like typical drum recording sounds of the 1970s. Rutherford played the drums alongside Thompson during live performances of the song on the album's tour. Whilst the group were deciding the final track listing for Abacab, Atlantic Records president Ahmet Ertegun believed "Who Dunnit?" should be included. At one point, Genesis considered releasing "Who Dunnit?" as a single.

=== Additional songs ===
Among the songs that were left off the album were three that were picked for release on Genesis's second EP, 3×3. This contained "Paperlate", "You Might Recall", and "Me and Virgil", which were included on the international edition of their third live album Three Sides Live, both released in 1982. Two other songs, "Naminanu" and "Submarine", originally part of a four-song suite with "Dodo"/"Lurker", were released as B-sides on the album's singles.

== Artwork ==
This four-frame animation shows all four colour schemes used for the album's cover artwork.

The cover was designed by English artist Bill Smith, who recalled that the group were difficult to work with as "they only ever knew what they didn't like". He first presented the band with portfolios from various illustrators, but the group did not find anything that they liked from them. Rutherford took Smith's sketchbook and spotted an abstract design initially made for a book, which featured an arrangement of torn inch-long pieces of paper from a Pantone swatch of colours with squiggly black lines. The band chose it as the cover, and Smith reproduced it in four different colour schemes with an embossed finish. The band liked all four, and thought it would have an effective presentation on shop displays. Three of the designs had a limited print, after which their label Charisma Records selected the original montage to remain in stock. Smith recalled the difficulty in persuading Genesis manager Tony Smith and staff at Charisma that "these tiny scraps of coloured paper" was to be the album's cover, but he was successful from having the group's backing and noted it became "his best paid job ever." Genesis allowed Smith to retain the copyright to his work. In a contrast to previous Genesis albums, the sleeve is absent of lyrics. Banks reasoned this would reduce the emphasis on the words, which he thought had been overdone on previous albums, in order to make them more of a part in the album's overall sound.

== Release ==
Abacab was released on 18 September 1981 in the United Kingdom by Charisma Records and 24 September 1981 in the United States by Atlantic Records. It was simultaneously released in four different colour schemes.

In 2007, Abacab was remastered with a new stereo and 5.1 surround sound mix and bonus features as part of the Genesis 1976–1982 box set.

== Critical reception ==
Professional ratings
Review scores
Source	Rating
AllMusic	4.5/5 stars
Q	2/5 stars
Record Mirror	5/5 stars
Rolling Stone	3/5 stars
The Rolling Stone Album Guide	4/5 stars
Smash Hits	6.5/10

In a review for Melody Maker, reporter Paul Colbert thought the album was the band's least consistent and therefore, least predictable in three years. He recognised a "heavy PC [Phil Collins] twist to the sound" on "Man on the Corner" and "No Reply at All", but "he does not have it all his own way". Colbert, however, thought Genesis had produced "a couple of Frankensteins" such as the latter half of "Abacab", which he deemed "unstructured" and "uninspired" compared to their past instrumentals. He named "Keep It Dark" and "Who Dunnit?" as "the most exciting and innovative music" the band had produced for several years, and concluded with the album is "by far more promising" than Duke or ...And Then There Were Three.... Ken Kubernik of the Los Angeles Times wondered if the success of Collins's solo album Face Value was an influence on the group, to which he replied, "Yes and no." He praised the album for its "thick, resonant instrumental passages, quaint imagery in the lyrics, and superb production", but "beneath the surface are some new wrinkles in the trademark Genesis sound", noting a reduction in harmonies for more simple vocals and Collins's drum sound replacing Banks's keyboards as their "vortex". Kubernik did, however, praise Collins's vocals.

Jim Bohen for Daily Record recognised Abacab had largely taken its direction from Collins's Face Value with its structure based around a "a huge, booming drum sound". He noted the instrumentation is less restrained than previous Genesis albums. "Who Dunnit?" was described as "an Ian Dury like tongue-twister", yet deemed "Dodo/Lurker", "Like It or Not", and "Another Record" as "less noteworthy". Bohen concludes, however, that the album "drags this trio of art-rockers into the 80s at last". A positive review was published in The Pittsburgh Press by Pete Bishop. He named Abacab a "state-of-the-art" album and picked "Abacab" and "No Reply at All" as particularly good tracks despite Collins's vocals not being "the world's strongest". Bishop said "Who Dunnit?" was the album's only "dud", yet believed overall the album would please Genesis fans. An uncredited review in The Coshocton Tribune in Ohio predicted the album would be Genesis's first top ten album in the US due to its similarity to Face Value, but rated it ahead of "the dreary Duke".

David Fricke of Rolling Stone praised the album for shedding the "ivory-tower artistry" of their previous albums, turning to sparse arrangements and "highly rhythmic interplay" and drawing inspiration from popular contemporaries such as XTC and The Police. In his retrospective review for AllMusic, critic Stephen Thomas Erlewine echoed this sentiment with greater emphasis, declaring "Duke showcased a new Genesis... but Abacab was where this new incarnation of the band came into its own." He also argued that although the album is far richer in pop hooks and accessibility than the band's previous works, at its heart Abacab "is truly modern art rock, their last album that could bear that tag comfortably."

== Tour ==
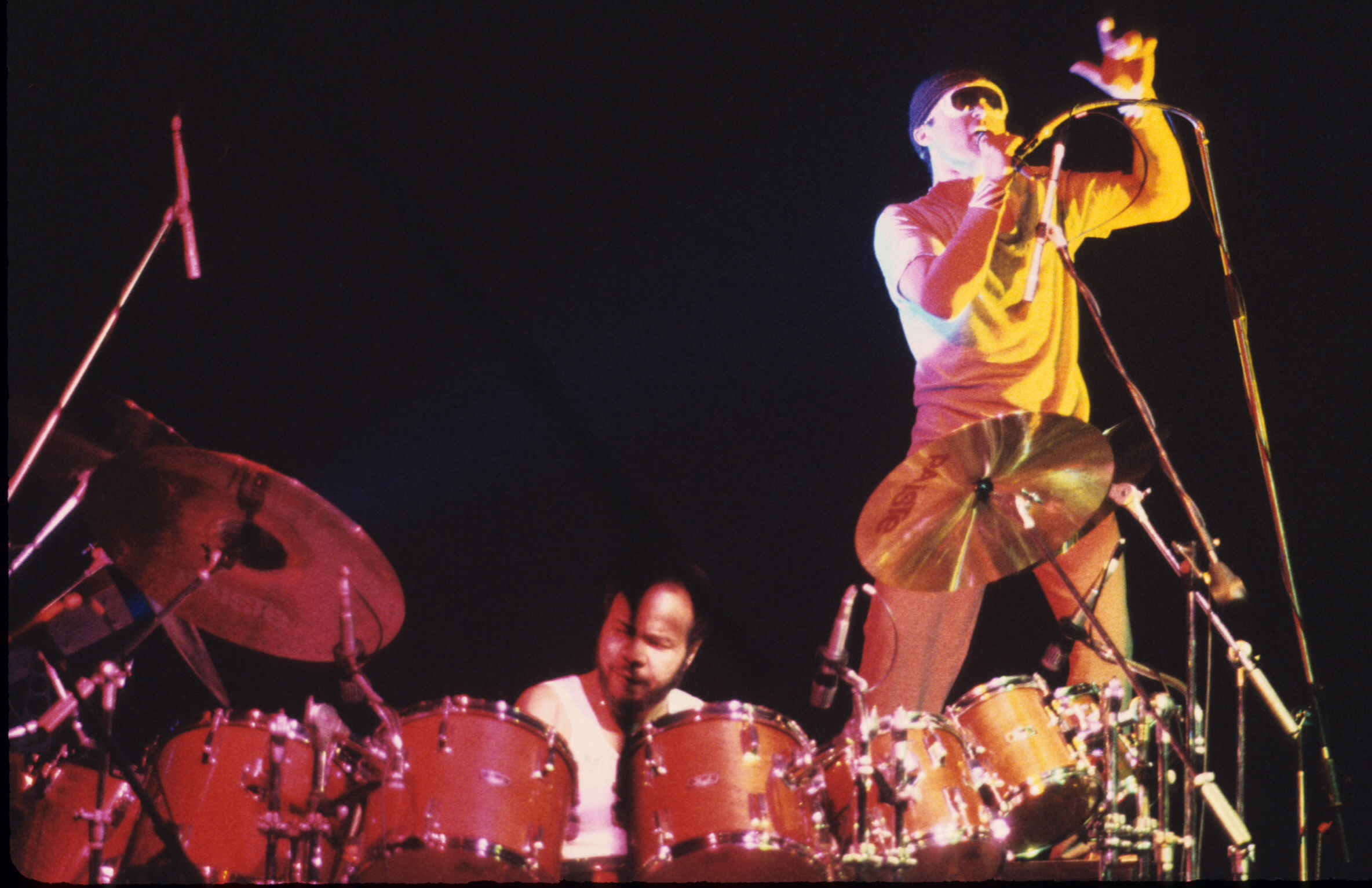
Chester Thompson and Collins on the album's 1981 tour, performing "Who Dunnit?"

Genesis toured Abacab with a European and North American tour between September and December 1981. The tour marked the first appearance of the Vari-Lite automated lighting system in which Genesis invested $1 million towards its development. Recordings from shows in New York City, Uniondale, New York, and Birmingham, England were included in the band's third live album, Three Sides Live, and the same-titled concert video, both released in 1982.

== Track listing ==
All music written by Tony Banks, Phil Collins, and Mike Rutherford, except where noted. All songs arranged and performed by Genesis. Lyricists specified below.

Side one
No.	Title	Lyrics	Music	Length
1.	"Abacab"	Rutherford		6:58
2.	"No Reply at All"	Collins		4:33
3.	"Me and Sarah Jane"	Banks	Banks	6:02
4.	"Keep It Dark"	Banks		4:33
Total length:				22:06

Side two
No.	Title	Lyrics	Music	Length
1.	"Dodo"/"Lurker": "Dodo" (5:09); "Lurker" (2:19)	Banks		7:28
2.	"Who Dunnit?"	Collins		3:22
3.	"Man on the Corner"	Collins	Collins	4:28
4.	"Like It or Not"	Rutherford	Rutherford	4:58
5.	"Another Record"	Rutherford		4:38
Total length:				24:54

=== Additional tracks ===
Additional songs recorded during the Abacab sessions can be found on other releases:

Abacab outtakes
Title	Source
"Naminanu"	"No Reply at All" (EU) "Keep It Dark"
"Submarine"	"Man on the Corner"
"Paperlate"	3×3; Three Sides Live
"You Might Recall"	3×3; Three Sides Live
"Me and Virgil"	3×3; Three Sides Live

== Personnel ==
Credits are adapted from the album's sleeve notes.

Genesis

- Tony Banks – keyboards
- Phil Collins – drums, vocals
- Mike Rutherford – guitars, basses

Additional musicians

- EWF Horns – horns on "No Reply at All"
- Thomas "Tom Tom 84" Washington – horn arrangements on "No Reply at All"

Production

- Genesis – producers
- Hugh Padgham – engineer
- Bill Smith – album cover
- Chris Peyton – sleeve adaptation (for The Redroom)
- Carol Willis – project coordination
- Tony Smith – manager

== Charts ==
=== Weekly charts ===
Weekly chart performance for Abacab
Chart (1981–82)	Peak position
Australian Albums (Kent Music Report)	18
Canada Top Albums/CDs (RPM)	3
Dutch Albums (Album Top 100)	6
Finnish Albums (The Official Finnish Charts)	14
French Albums (SNEP)	1
German Albums (Offizielle Top 100)	6
Italian Albums (Musica e dischi)	2
Japanese Albums (Oricon)	62
New Zealand Albums (RMNZ)	44
Norwegian Albums (VG-lista)	4
Swedish Albums (Sverigetopplistan)	11
UK Albums (Official Charts)	1
US Billboard 200	7

=== Year-end charts ===
Year-end chart performance for Abacab
Chart (1981)	Position
Canada Top Albums/CDs (RPM)	22
Chart (1982)	Position
Canada Top Albums/CDs (RPM)	56
US Billboard 200	12

== Certifications ==
Certifications for Abacab
Region	Certification	Certified units/sales
Australia (ARIA)	Gold	20,000^{^}
France (SNEP)	Gold	100,000^{*}
Germany (BVMI)	Gold	250,000^{^}
Italy (FIMI)	Gold	500,000
Japan (RIAJ)	Gold	100,000^{^}
United Kingdom (BPI)	Gold	100,000^{^}
United States (RIAA)	2× Platinum	2,000,000^{^}
^{*} Sales figures based on certification alone.^{^} Shipments figures based on certification alone.
