= Abacab (song) =

1981 single by Genesis

Single by Genesis

from the album Abacab
- B-side: "Another Record"
- Released: 14 August 1981 (UK): December 1981 (US)
- Recorded: May–June 1981
- Studio: The Farm (Surrey)
- Genre: New wave; progressive rock
- Length: 7:02 (LP version); 4:10 (UK single edit); 3:59 (US single edit)
- Label: Charisma/Phonogram (UK); Atlantic (US)
- Songwriters: Mike Rutherford; Tony Banks; Phil Collins
- Producers: Genesis; Hugh Padgham

Genesis singles chronology
"Misunderstanding" (1980)	"Abacab" (1981)	"No Reply at All" (1981)

"Abacab" is a song by the English rock band Genesis, released on 14 August 1981. It was produced by Genesis and distributed in the United States by Atlantic Records and Warner Music Group. The song, mainly written by Mike Rutherford with Tony Banks and Phil Collins with lyrics by Rutherford, was featured on Genesis' studio album of the same name and was a top 10 hit on the British pop chart, where it peaked at No. 9. The song was the second single from the album in the US, where it peaked at No. 26 on the Billboard Hot 100 chart in early 1982. It stayed in the Top 40 for six weeks.

== Background ==
The title is taken from the structure of an early version of the song. Guitarist Mike Rutherford explained in an interview in 2006:

[There are] three bits of music in "Abacab" and we refer to them as 'bit A', [correcting self] 'Section A', 'Section B', and 'Section C'. And at different times they were in a different order. We'd start with section A and then have section C and then have section [pauses] and at one point in time, it spelt "ABACAB". And you've got the final version where it's not that at all, it's like "ACACACUCUBUBUGA".

== Different versions ==
The track was regularly performed on the band's 1981 Abacab tour, the 1982 Three Sides Live Encore Tour, the 1983/84 Mama Tour and the 1986/87 Invisible Touch tours. On the first two tours, Phil Collins would sing the chorus in a high falsetto while Banks and Rutherford sang the lower harmonies. For the later tours, Collins would sing the chorus in a lower octave while Rutherford sang the higher falsetto harmonies. Genesis rehearsed the song for the 2007 reunion, but it was not included in the final setlist.

The song's LP version features an extended instrumental jam as an outro, while the single version instead repeats the intro of the song after the final chorus then quickly fades out. (The single edit is used for the music video, and is included on their 1999 greatest hits album, Turn It On Again: The Hits.)

== Critical reception ==
Record World said that "sinuous keyboards, pulsating synthesizers and a driving rock beat transport Phil Collins' lead vocal."

== Charts ==
Chart (1981–1982)	Peak position
Australia (Kent Music Report)	35
Belgium (Ultratop 50 Flanders)	36
Canadian RPM Singles Chart	11
Italy (FIMI)	11
Ireland (Irish Singles Chart)	16
Netherlands (Dutch Top 40)	26
Norway (VG-lista)	8
South Africa (Springbok Charts)	3
UK Singles (Official Charts)	9
US Cash BoxTop 100	40
US Billboard Hot 100	26
US Dance Club Songs (Billboard)	43
West Germany (GfK)	28

== Personnel ==
Genesis

- Phil Collins – lead and backing vocals, drums, percussion
- Tony Banks – keyboards
- Mike Rutherford – electric guitar, bass pedals

Additional musicians

- EWF Horns (uncredited) – sped-up horn noises in ending instrumental section
