= No Reply at All =

Single by Genesis

from the album Abacab
- B-side: "Dodo" (US): "Naminanu" (EU)
- Released: September 1981 (US)
- Recorded: 1981
- Genre: Pop rock
- Length: 4:40 (LP version); 4:00 (US promo single edit/music video)
- Label: Vertigo (EU); Atlantic (US)
- Songwriters: Tony Banks; Phil Collins; Mike Rutherford
- Producers: Genesis; Hugh Padgham

Genesis singles chronology
"Abacab" (1981)	"No Reply at All" (1981)	"Keep It Dark" (1981)

Music video
- "No Reply at All" on YouTube

"No Reply at All" is a song by the English rock band Genesis, released as the lead single in the US from their eleventh studio album, Abacab (1981). It was not released in the UK, where "Abacab" was the first single. The US single release edit omits the second verse of the song as it appears on the Abacab album.

== Structure ==
This song, like Phil Collins' solo track "I Missed Again" (recorded at around the same time), makes prominent use of a horn section, arranged by Tom Tom 84 (i.e. Thomas Washington, horn arranger for Earth, Wind & Fire) and played by that band's wind players, credited on the song as "EWF Horns". The song marks a step toward the mainstream pop direction Genesis was taking at the time, yet it still contains elements of their past: complex, melodic bass riffs, and a cross-hand technique on a Prophet-5, similar to the style used for the intro to "The Lamb Lies Down on Broadway", from their 1974 studio album of the same name

The song was released as the first single from Abacab in the US, and reached the US Top 30 in the fall of 1981. "No Reply at All" spent 18 weeks on the Billboard Hot 100, longer than most of their hits which reached the Top 10, including "Invisible Touch", which spent only 17 weeks on the chart in comparison.

Record World praised "Michael Rutherford's playful bass figures and Phil Collins' inventive drumming."

The song was performed live by the American rock band Phish as a tribute to Genesis at the Rock and Roll Hall of Fame's 2010 induction ceremony. Phish also performed "Watcher of the Skies" that night.

== Music video ==
The music video features only the band. Cameras revolve around the band playing their parts in a rehearsal setting. When the horn part is prominent, it cuts to a different shot of the band – wearing hats, sunglasses, and jackets to conceal their identity – playing the trumpet, saxophone and trombone.

== Personnel ==
- Phil Collins – drums, lead and backing vocals
- Tony Banks – Yamaha CP-70 electric grand piano, Prophet-5
- Mike Rutherford – electric guitar, bass guitar
- The Phenix Horns – horns

== Chart performance ==
=== Weekly charts ===
Chart (1981)	Peak position
Canadian RPM Singles Chart	7
U.S. Billboard Hot 100	29
U.S. Top Rock Tracks	2
U.S. Cash Box Top 100	28

=== Year-end charts ===
Chart (1981)	Rank
Canada	44
