= Tony Barrow =

English press officer for the Beatles (1936–2016)

- Born: 11 May 1936; Crosby, Lancashire, England, UK
- Died: 14 May 2016 (aged 80); Lancaster, Lancashire, England, UK
- Education: Durham University
- Occupation: Press officer
- Years active: 1954–2007
- Known for: Work with the Beatles; Coining the phrase "the Fab Four"

Anthony F. J. Barrow (11 May 1936 – 14 May 2016) was an English press officer who worked with the Beatles between 1962 and 1968. He coined the phrase "the Fab Four", first using it in an early press release.

== Life ==
=== Early life ===
In the late 1950s, when teenagers John Lennon and Paul McCartney were putting together their earliest group in one part of Liverpool, Tony Barrow was presenting jazz bands and skiffle-folk groups at local dance halls and clubs across town, in the south Lancashire suburb of Crosby. Educated locally at Merchant Taylors School he later studied languages at Durham University. In 1954, when he was still an 18-year-old sixth-form schoolboy, he landed his first regular freelance writing job as pop-rock record reviewer for the Liverpool Echo, the largest-selling provincial evening newspaper in the UK.

=== Decca ===
At the beginning of the 1960s, while the Beatles worked in the Hamburg clubs, Barrow moved from Crosby to London to work for the Decca Record Company, where he wrote the liner notes that appeared on the back of LP album covers. From his new London base, he continued to contribute his weekly record column to the Liverpool Echo, and when Liverpool record retailer Brian Epstein signed the Beatles to a management deal at the end of 1961, he contacted Barrow for professional advice. In a 1968 interview, Barrow recounted that Epstein asked him to write a column about the band. Barrow then arranged to get the Beatles an audition with Decca, who rejected them. That led to an informal arrangement whereby Barrow became the Beatles' part-time press-publicity consultant, which involved promoting the launch of the new EMI band from behind a desk at rival London record company Decca. His earliest task for Epstein was to co-ordinate a media publicity campaign to surround the release of the group's first UK single, "Love Me Do", on EMI's Parlophone label in October 1962. He was paid a one-off freelance fee of £20 to compile the Beatles' initial press kit.

=== NEMS ===
When Epstein promised to double his Decca salary, Barrow left the record company in May 1963 to join Epstein's new artists' management company, NEMS Enterprises, on a full-time basis. Barrow opened Epstein's first London office and, as head of the Press and Public Relations Division, began to promote the careers of not only the Beatles but also Epstein's other artists, such as Cilla Black, Gerry & The Pacemakers, Billy J Kramer with the Dakotas and The Fourmost. In view of his previous employment as a liner-note writer with Decca, it was taken for granted that he would do the same job for the Beatles and Epstein's other acts.

Barrow saw Beatlemania as beginning with the band's appearance on Sunday Night at the London Palladium on 13 October 1963, at which point he no longer had to contact the press but had the press contacting him instead.

It was Barrow's idea to give out Beatles Christmas greetings to their fan club members. Barrow thought that goodwill gesture might limit the damage done to the group's reputation by delays in replying to an ever-increasing volume of fan mail. The Beatles were three weeks behind in answering membership applications. At the time he said that he thought of how the Queen always sent out Yuletide greetings to her subjects every year on UK radio and TV, and he decided that the Beatles should "follow her fine example but in their own way". All members of the group's official fan club would receive an exclusive flexi-disc containing messages from John, Paul, George and Ringo. What started as a one-off damage limitation job grew into an eagerly anticipated annual event.

In 1965 and 1966's, Barrow travelled around the globe with John Lennon, Paul McCartney, George Harrison and Ringo Starr on the Beatles' biggest, most lucrative and most dangerous international concert tours, conducting their massive daily press conferences wherever they were on the road, accompanying them on their very private "summit of the giants" meeting with Elvis Presley at his home in Bel Air, California, and setting up the Fab Four's media interviews and photo shoots when they returned home. One of Barrow's final tasks as the Beatles' Press Officer was to compile and edit the strip-cartoon story booklet which was part of the "Magical Mystery Tour" recording package at the end of 1967.

=== After the Beatles ===
When the Beatles set up their own self-management operation, Apple Corps, in 1968, the year after Brian Epstein's death, Barrow's job as their publicist became redundant. He left NEMS Enterprises to set up his own independent show business PR consultancy, Tony Barrow International. Headquartered in London's Mayfair district, TBI and its sister company, Tony Barrow Management, represented many of Britain's entertainers and recording artists in the 1970s, including the Kinks, the Bay City Rollers, the New Seekers, Bob Monkhouse, and Hello, as well as handling the European tours of American artists, including David Cassidy, Gladys Knight, David Soul, the Monkees, Tony Bennett, the Jackson Five, Andy Williams, and Neil Sedaka.

In 1980, partly because he disliked the unsavory images portrayed by the era's new wave of punk bands, Tony Barrow quit the PR business to return to freelance journalism, writing various books, including a career guide, Inside The Music Business (co-authored with Julian Newby), and John, Paul, George, Ringo & Me, his memoir of the 1960s.

By 2007, he had become the last surviving professional writer from the Beatles' original inner circle of business aides and associates, and was continuing to take on selected writing and broadcasting assignments, including some directly linked to his years with the Beatles.

Contrary to newspaper reports that Barrow died at his home in Morecambe, Lancashire, he actually died in the Royal Lancaster Infirmary on 14 May 2016, three days after his 80th birthday.

== Books ==
- The Making of the Beatles' Magical Mystery Tour (1999) ISBN 0-7119-7575-2
- John, Paul, George, Ringo and Me: The Real Beatles Story (2006) ISBN 1-56025-882-9
