= Genesis discography =

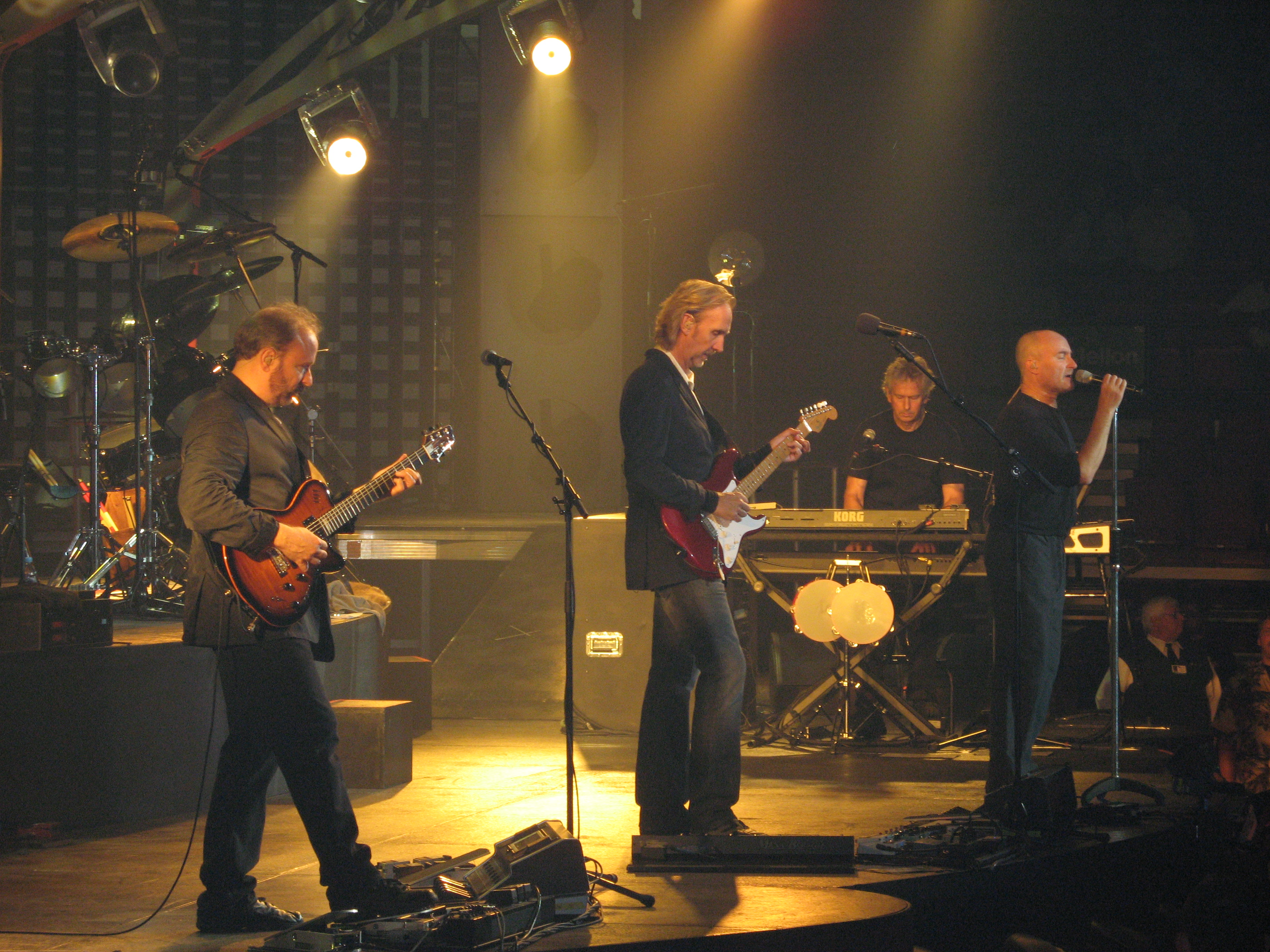
- Genesis live on Turn It On Again: The Tour in 2007
- Studio albums: 15
- Extended plays: 4
- Live albums: 6
- Compilation albums: 4
- Singles: 49
- Video albums: 16
- Music videos: 31
- Box sets: 10

The discography of the English rock band Genesis contains 15 studio albums, six live albums, three compilation albums and 10 box sets. They have sold more than 100 million records worldwide, including about 21.5 million RIAA-certified albums in the United States

Genesis were formed by lead singer Peter Gabriel, keyboardist Tony Banks, bassist / guitarist Mike Rutherford, guitarist Anthony Phillips and drummer Chris Stewart at Charterhouse School, where they drew on contemporary pop, soul, classical and church music influences to write their own songs. They attracted the interest of former pupil Jonathan King, who signed them to a contract in 1967. Following the failure of the first few singles, and an album, From Genesis to Revelation, the group split from King in 1969, signing with Charisma Records the following year. From then to 1974, Genesis released a studio album around once a year. After several line-up changes, the band stabilised in 1971 after drummer Phil Collins and guitarist Steve Hackett joined Gabriel, Banks and Rutherford. The group established commercial success in the UK with Foxtrot (1972) and Selling England by the Pound (1973), with the latter charting at No. 3 and producing their first hit single, "I Know What I Like (In Your Wardrobe)" (1974).

Genesis survived Gabriel's departure in 1975, with Collins taking over as lead singer, releasing the top three album A Trick of the Tail the following year. Hackett left in 1977, reducing the group to a trio of Banks, Rutherford and Collins. They became more commercially successful and began to have further hit singles, with "Follow You Follow Me" (1978) their first UK top ten hit and first US top 40 hit. Beginning with Duke (1980), they had five consecutive studio albums which topped the UK charts, reaching a peak with Invisible Touch (1986) and We Can't Dance (1991). After Collins left in 1996, the band released one more album, Calling All Stations (1997), before disbanding. The trio lineup reformed for Turn It On Again: The Tour in 2007 and a farewell tour, The Last Domino? Tour, from 2021 to 2022.

All of the group's work since signing to Charisma (since acquired by Virgin Records then EMI) was remastered and re-released and is available on various compilation albums such as Turn It On Again: The Hits and Platinum Collection. The sole exception is pre-Charisma album From Genesis to Revelation, whose copyright is owned by King and has been reissued several times independently of the rest of the band's releases.

== Albums ==
=== Studio albums ===
Title	Album details	Peak chart positions										Certifications
Title	Album details	UK	AUS	AUT	GER	IT	NL	NOR	NZ	SWE	US	Certifications
From Genesis to Revelation	Released: 28 March 1969; Label: Decca; Formats: LP	—	—	—	—	—	—	—	—	—	170 (Note: Charted in 1974.)	
Trespass	Released: 23 October 1970; UK label: Charisma; US label: Impulse!; Formats: LP, 8-track	98 (Note: Chart peak upon reissue in 1984.)	—	—	—	—	—	—	—	—	—	
Nursery Cryme	Released: 12 November 1971; Label: Charisma; Formats: LP, 8-track	39 (Note: Chart peak upon reissue in 1974.)	—	—	—	11	—	—	—	—	—	BPI: Silver
Foxtrot	Released: 15 September 1972; Label: Charisma; Formats: LP, MC	12	—	—	45	15	—	—	—	—	—	BPI: Gold
Selling England by the Pound	Released: 5 October 1973; Label: Charisma; Formats: LP, MC, 8-track, reel-to-reel	3	52	—	—	4	—	—	—	—	70	BPI: Gold; FIMI: Gold; RIAA: Gold
The Lamb Lies Down on Broadway	Released: 22 November 1974; UK label: Charisma; US label: Atco/Atlantic; Formats: 2xLP, 2xMC, 2x8-track	10	80	75	11	14	35	—	34	—	41	BPI: Gold; RIAA: Gold
A Trick of the Tail	Released: 13 February 1976; UK label: Charisma; US label: Atco/Atlantic; Formats: LP, MC, 8-track	3	93	—	43	4	7	—	4	17	31	BPI: Gold; RIAA: Gold
Wind & Wuthering	Released: 20 December 1976; UK label: Charisma; US label: Atco/Atlantic; Formats: LP, MC, 8-track	7	57	—	19	7	15	12	18	21	26	BPI: Gold; RIAA: Gold
...And Then There Were Three...	Released: 31 March 1978; UK label: Charisma; US label: Atlantic; Formats: LP, MC, 8-track	3	12	17	2	6	8	7	10	22	14	BPI: Gold; BVMI: Gold; NVPI: Gold; RIAA: Platinum
Duke	Released: 24 March 1980; UK label: Charisma; US label: Atlantic; Formats: LP, MC, 8-track	1	22	14	2	6	12	4	13	9	11	BPI: Platinum; FIMI: Gold; RIAA: Platinum
Abacab	Released: 18 September 1981; UK label: Charisma; US label: Atlantic; Formats: LP, MC, 8-track	1	18	—	6	2	6	4	44	11	7	BPI: Gold; ARIA: Gold; BVMI: Gold; FIMI: Gold; RIAA: 2× Platinum
Genesis	Released: 3 October 1983; UK label: Charisma/Virgin; US label: Atlantic; Formats: LP, MC, 8-track, reel-to-reel	1	41	2	1	4	2	2	2	12	9	BPI: 2× Platinum; BVMI: Platinum; NVPI: Gold; RIAA: 4× Platinum; RMNZ: Platinum
Invisible Touch	Released: 6 June 1986; UK label: Charisma/Virgin; US label: Atlantic; Formats: CD, LP, MC, 8-track	1	3	5	2	6	2	3	1	4	3	BPI: 4× Platinum; ARIA: 3× Platinum; BVMI: Platinum; FIMI: Platinum; RIAA: 6× Platinum; RMNZ: 4× Platinum
We Can't Dance	Released: 11 November 1991; UK label: Virgin; US label: Atlantic; Formats: CD, 2xLP, MC	1	8	1	1	5	1	1	5	4	4	BPI: 5× Platinum; ARIA: 2× Platinum; BVMI: 5× Platinum; GLF: Platinum; IFPI AUT: Platinum; NVPI: Platinum; RIAA: 4× Platinum; RMNZ: 4× Platinum
Calling All Stations	Released: 1 September 1997; UK label: Virgin; US label: Atlantic; Formats: CD, LP, MC, MD	2	—	6	2	7	9	2	—	11	54	BPI: Gold; BVMI: Gold; FIMI: Gold
"—" denotes releases that did not chart or were not released in that territory.

=== Live albums ===
Title	Album details	Peak chart positions										Certifications
Title	Album details	UK	AUS	AUT	GER	IT	NL	NOR	NZ	SWE	US	Certifications
Genesis Live	Released: 20 July 1973; Label: Charisma; Formats: LP, MC, 8-track	9	—	—	—	11	—	—	—	—	105	
Seconds Out	Released: 14 October 1977; UK label: Charisma; US label: Atlantic; Formats: 2xLP, 2xMC, 8-track	4	74	—	17	7	19	—	14	26	47	BPI: Gold; BVMI: Gold
Three Sides Live	Released: 4 June 1982; UK label: Charisma; US label: Atlantic; Formats: 2xLP, MC, 8-track	2	53	—	22	12	6	14	—	49	10	BPI: Gold; RIAA: Gold
The Way We Walk, Volume One: The Shorts	Released: 16 November 1992; UK label: Virgin; US label: Atlantic; Formats: CD, LP, MC	3	37	8	2	24	18	—	2	40	35	BPI: 2× Platinum; BVMI: 3× Gold; NVPI: Gold; RIAA: Gold; RMNZ: Platinum
The Way We Walk, Volume Two: The Longs	Released: 11 January 1993; UK label: Virgin; US label: Atlantic; Formats: CD, LP, MC	1	32	12	2	17	5	17	14	33	20	BPI: Gold
Live over Europe 2007	Released: 20 November 2007; UK label: Virgin; US label: Atlantic; Formats: 2xCD	51	47	47	1	47	70	—	—	—	—	BPI: Silver; BVMI: Gold
"—" denotes releases that did not chart or were not released in that territory.

=== Compilation albums ===
Title	Album details	Peak chart positions										Certifications
Title	Album details	UK	AUS	AUT	GER	IT	NL	NOR	NZ	SWE	US	Certifications
Turn It On Again: Best of '81–'83	Released: 1991; Label: Vertigo; Formats: CD, LP, MC; Not released in the UK	—	—	—	8	—	31	—	—	—	—	
Turn It On Again: The Hits	Released: 25 October 1999; UK label: Virgin; US label: Atlantic; Formats: CD, MC, MD	4	98	6	1	35 (Note: Charted in 2007 after being re-released as Turn It On Again: The Hits – The Tour Edition.)	9	1	15	15	65	BPI: 2× Platinum; BVMI: Platinum; NVPI: Gold; RIAA: Gold; RMNZ: 4× Platinum
Platinum Collection	Released: 29 November 2004; UK label: Virgin; US label: Atlantic/Rhino; Formats: 3xCD	21	—	—	15	52	4	15	24	—	—	BPI: Platinum; BVMI: Gold
The Last Domino?	Released: 17 September 2021; UK label: Virgin/EMI/UME; US label: Atlantic/Rhino; Formats: 2xCD, 4xLP, digital download	9	—	36	8	96	68	—	—	—	—	
"—" denotes releases that did not chart or were not released in that territory.

=== Box sets ===
Title	Album details	Peak chart positions						Certifications
Title	Album details	UK	AUS	AUT	GER	IT	NL	Certifications
Genesis Collection Volume One	Released: 11 April 1975; Label: Charisma; Formats: 2xLP	—	—	—	—	—	—	
Genesis Collection Volume Two	Released: 11 April 1975; Label: Charisma; Formats: 2xLP	—	—	—	—	—	—	
Genesis Archive 1967–75	Released: 22 June 1998; UK label: Virgin; US label: Atlantic; Formats: 4xCD	35	—	—	75	—	—	
Genesis Archive #2 1976–92	Released: 6 November 2000; UK label: Virgin; US label: Atlantic; Formats: 3xCD	103	—	—	—	—	—	
Genesis 1976–1982	Released: 2 April 2007; UK label: Virgin; US label: Atlantic/Rhino; Formats: 6xCD+6xDVD	—	—	—	—	—	—	
Genesis 1983–1998	Released: 1 October 2007; UK label: Virgin; US label: Atlantic/Rhino; Formats: 5xCD+5xDVD	—	—	—	57	—	—	
Genesis 1970–1975	Released: 10 November 2008; UK label: Virgin; US label: Atlantic/Rhino; Formats: 7xCD+6xDVD, 6xLP	151	—	—	22	96	65	
Genesis Live 1973–2007	Released: 21 September 2009; UK label: Virgin; US label: Atlantic/Rhino; Formats: 10xCD+3xDVD	—	—	—	42	—	—	
R-Kive	Released: 22 September 2014; UK label: Virgin/UME; US label: Rhino; Formats: 3xCD, digital download	7	—	—	23	26	12	BPI: Silver
BBC Broadcasts	Released: 3 March 2023; UK label: EMI/UME; US label: Rhino; Formats: 5xCD, 3xLP	23	—	—	3	90	11	
"—" denotes releases that did not chart or were not released in that territory.

== EPs ==
Title	EP details	Peak chart positions		
Title	EP details	UK	IRE	SWE
Nursery Cryme	Released: July 1972; Label: Charisma; Formats: 7"; US-only release	—	—	—
Spot the Pigeon	Released: 20 May 1977; Label: Charisma; Formats: 7", 12"	14	—	9
3×3	Released: 10 May 1982; Label: Charisma; Formats: 7"	10	10	—
Live at Knebworth	Released: 12 June 2021; Label: Mercury; Formats: 12"; Record Store Day release	—	—	—
"—" denotes releases that did not chart or were not released in that territory.

== Singles ==
=== 1960s ===
Single	Year	Album
"The Silent Sun"	1968	From Genesis to Revelation
"A Winter's Tale"	1968	Non-album single
"Where the Sour Turns to Sweet"	1969	From Genesis to Revelation

=== 1970s ===
Single	Year	Peak chart positions										Certifications	Album
Single	Year	UK	AUS	AUT	CAN	GER	IRE	NL	NZ	SWI	US	Certifications	Album
"The Knife"	1971	—	—	—	—	—	—	—	—	—	—		Trespass
"Happy the Man"	1972	—	—	—	—	—	—	—	—	—	—		Non-album single (Note: Despite being a non-album single, its B-side "Seven Stones" was taken from the album Nursery Cryme.)
"Watcher of the Skies" (Note: "Watcher of the Skies" was only released as a single in the US, Germany, Italy and New Zealand.)	1973	—	—	—	—	—	—	—	—	—	—		Foxtrot (Note: The single version of "Watcher of the Skies" was a different recording from the Foxtrot version, so it was technically a non-album single.)
"I Know What I Like (In Your Wardrobe)"	1974	21	—	—	—	—	—	—	—	—	—		Selling England by the Pound
"Counting Out Time"	1974	—	—	—	—	—	—	—	—	—	—		The Lamb Lies Down on Broadway
"In the Beginning" (Note: "In the Beginning" was only released as a single in Italy.)	1974	—	—	—	—	—	—	—	—	—	—		From Genesis to Revelation
"The Lamb Lies Down on Broadway" (Note: "The Lamb Lies Down on Broadway" was only released as a single in the US.)	1975	—	—	—	—	—	—	—	—	—	—		The Lamb Lies Down on Broadway
"The Carpet Crawlers"	1975	—	—	—	—	—	—	—	—	—	—		The Lamb Lies Down on Broadway
"A Trick of the Tail"	1976	—	—	—	—	—	—	—	—	—	—		A Trick of the Tail
"Ripples" (Note: "Ripples" was only released as a single in Italy.)	1976	—	—	—	—	—	—	—	—	—	—		A Trick of the Tail
"Entangled" (Note: "Entangled" was only released as a single in the US, Canada and France.)	1976	—	—	—	—	—	—	—	—	—	—		A Trick of the Tail
"Your Own Special Way"	1977	43	—	—	83	—	—	—	—	—	62		Wind & Wuthering
"Follow You Follow Me"	1978	7	16	15	25	8	10	9	22	6	23	BPI: Silver; RMNZ: Gold	...And Then There Were Three...
"Many Too Many"	1978	43	—	—	—	41	—	—	—	—	—		...And Then There Were Three...
"Go West Young Man (In the Motherlode)" (Note: "Go West Young Man (In the Motherlode)" was only released as a single in the US, Canada and Japan.)	1978	—	—	—	—	—	—	—	—	—	—		...And Then There Were Three...
"—" denotes releases that did not chart or were not released in that territory.

=== 1980s ===
Single	Year	Peak chart positions											Certifications	Albums
Single	Year	UK	AUS	AUT	CAN	GER	IRE	NL	NZ	SWI	US	US Main	Certifications	Albums
"Turn It On Again"	1980	8	—	—	49	66	12	(Note: "Turn It On Again" did not enter the Single Top 100, but peaked at #38 on the Dutch Top 40)	—	—	58	—		Duke
"Duchess"	1980	46	—	—	—	—	—	—	—	—	—	—		Duke
"Misunderstanding"	1980	42	—	—	1	—	—	—	—	—	14	—		Duke
"Abacab"	1981	9	35	—	11	28	16	25	50	—	26	4		Abacab
"No Reply at All" (Note: "No Reply at All" wasn't released as a single in the UK, but was released in numerous other territories.)	1981	—	74	—	7	—	—	—	—	—	29	2		Abacab
"Keep It Dark"	1981	33	—	—	—	—	—	—	—	—	—	—		Abacab
"Man on the Corner"	1982	41	—	—	28	—	—	—	—	—	40	14		Abacab
"Paperlate" (Note: Whilst the EP 3×3 was released in the UK and Ireland, its lead track "Paperlate" was released as a single in various other territories.)	1982	—	73	—	25	36	—	40	—	—	32	2		Three Sides Live
"Turn It On Again" (live) (Note: This live version of "Turn It On Again" was only released as a single in Continental Europe.)	1982	—	—	—	—	—	—	—	—	—	—	—		Three Sides Live
"Mama"	1983	4	45	10	43	4	5	7	27	2	73	5	BPI: Silver; RMNZ: Gold	Genesis
"That's All"	1983	16	62	19	14	27	6	37	—	15	6	2	BPI: Silver; RMNZ: Platinum	Genesis
"Home by the Sea" (Note: "Home by the Sea" was only released as a single in Australasia and the Netherlands.)	1983	—	80	—	—	—	—	—	4	—	—	24	RMNZ: Gold	Genesis
"Illegal Alien"	1984	46	—	—	41	—	21	61	—	—	44	21		Genesis
"Taking It All Too Hard" (Note: "Taking It All Too Hard" was only released as a single in the US and Canada.)	1984	—	—	—	—	—	—	—	—	—	50	41		Genesis
"Invisible Touch"	1986	15	3	—	6	16	7	28	8	13	1	1	BPI: Platinum; RMNZ: Platinum	Invisible Touch
"Throwing It All Away"	1986	22	91	—	12	—	24	37	—	—	4	1		Invisible Touch
"In Too Deep"	1986	19	17	—	15	55	12	—	30	—	3	25		Invisible Touch
"Land of Confusion"	1986	14	21	27	8	7	9	10	9	8	4	11	RMNZ: Gold	Invisible Touch
"Tonight, Tonight, Tonight"	1987	18	93	—	19	23	9	—	42	—	3	9		Invisible Touch
"—" denotes releases that did not chart or were not released in that territory.

=== 1990s ===
Single	Year	Peak chart positions											Certifications	Album
Single	Year	UK	AUS	AUT	CAN	GER	IRE	NL	NZ	SWI	US	US Main	Certifications	Album
"No Son of Mine"	1991	6	29	7	1	3	5	7	36	8	12	3		We Can't Dance
"I Can't Dance"	1991	7	7	2	3	4	7	1	10	8	7	2	RMNZ: Platinum	We Can't Dance
"Hold on My Heart"	1992	16	63	—	1	45	20	13	—	—	12	—		We Can't Dance
"Jesus He Knows Me"	1992	20	56	26	10	13	22	18	35	—	23	24		We Can't Dance
"Never a Time"	1992	—	—	—	9	56	—	—	—	—	21	—		We Can't Dance
"Tell Me Why"	1992	40	110	—	—	51	—	37	—	—	—	—		We Can't Dance
"Invisible Touch" (live)	1992	7	—	—	—	—	22	—	—	—	—	—		The Way We Walk, Volume One: The Shorts
"Congo"	1997	29	—	—	28	31	—	—	—	32	—	25		Calling All Stations
"Shipwrecked"	1997	54	—	—	—	82	—	—	—	—	—			Calling All Stations
"Not About Us"	1998	66	—	—	—	81	—	—	—	—	—	—		Calling All Stations
"The Carpet Crawlers 1999"	1999	—	—	—	—	72	—	—	—	—	—	—		Turn It On Again: The Hits
"—" denotes releases that did not chart or were not released in that territory.

=== 2000s ===
Single	Year	Album
"The Silent Sun 2006"	2006	Non-album single

== Other charted songs ==
Single	Year	Peak chart positions		Album
Single	Year	CAN	US Main	Album
"You Might Recall"	1982	—	40	Three Sides Live
"It's Gonna Get Better"	1983	—	16	Genesis
"Just a Job to Do"	1983	—	10	Genesis
"The Last Domino"	1986	—	29	Invisible Touch
"Anything She Does"	1986	—	40	Invisible Touch
"Driving the Last Spike"	1992	51	25	We Can't Dance
"—" denotes releases that did not chart or were not released in that territory.

== Videos ==
=== Video albums ===
Title	Album details	Notes
Three Sides Live	Released: June 1982; UK label: Wienerworld Presentation; US label: Thorn EMI; Formats: VHS	Filmed live at Nassau Coliseum and The Savoy in November 1981.
The Mama Tour	Released: October 1985; UK label: Virgin Music Video; US label: Atlantic Video; Formats: VHS, Beta	Filmed live at the Birmingham NEC in February 1984.
Visible Touch	Released: July 1987; UK label: Virgin Music Video; US label: Atlantic Video; Formats: VHS, LD, CDV	Music videos from the Invisible Touch album.
Genesis Videos Volume 1	Released: July 1988; UK label: Virgin Music Video; US label: Atlantic Video; Formats: VHS	Compilation of music videos.
Genesis Videos Volume 2	Released: July 1988; UK label: Virgin Music Video; US label: Atlantic Video; Formats: VHS	Compilation of music videos.
Invisible Touch Tour	Released: May 1989; Label: Virgin Music Video; Formats: VHS, LD	Filmed live at Wembley Stadium in July 1987.
Knebworth '90	Released: December 1990; Label: Castle Music Pictures; Formats: VHS	Filmed live at the 1990 Knebworth Festival; Phil Collins' solo set from the same show was released separately.
Genesis: A History	Released: March 1991; UK label: M.C.E.G. Virgin Vision; US label: PolyGram Music Video; Formats: VHS, LD	
The Way We Walk	Released: March 1993; UK label: PolyGram Music Video; US label: Pioneer Artists; Formats: VHS, 2xLD	Filmed live at Earls Court in November 1992.
In Concert 1976	Released: 1994; Label: VAP Video; Formats: VHS, LD	Filmed live at the Apollo Theatre and Bingley Hall in July 1976.
The Genesis Songbook	Released: 23 July 2001; Label: Eagle Vision; Formats: DVD, VHS	
The Way We Walk	Released: 26 November 2001; UK label: Gut Vision; US label: Pioneer Artists; Formats: 2xDVD	Reissue; first time on DVD.
Live at Wembley Stadium	Released: 17 November 2003; UK label: Virgin; US label: Atlantic; Formats: DVD	Reissue of Invisible Touch Tour; first time on DVD.
The Video Show	Released: 29 November 2004; UK label: Virgin; US label: Atlantic/Rhino; Formats: DVD	Compilation of music videos.
When in Rome 2007	Released: 23 May 2008; UK label: Virgin; US label: Atlantic/Rhino; Formats: 2xDVD, 3xDVD	Filmed live at the Circus Maximus in July 2007.
The Movie Box 1981–2007	Released: 16 November 2009; UK label: Virgin; US label: Atlantic/Rhino; Formats: 8xDVD	Box set of Three Sides Live (first time on DVD), The Mama Tour (first time on DVD), Live at Wembley Stadium, The Way We Walk and When in Rome 2007.

=== Music videos ===
All the music videos are included on the 2004 DVD The Video Show, along with a 1982 Top of the Pops performance of "Paperlate".

Title	Year	Director
"Robbery, Assault and Battery"	1976	Bruce Gowers
"A Trick of the Tail"	1976	Bruce Gowers
"Ripples"	1976	Bruce Gowers
"Follow You Follow Me"	1978	B. Rymer
"Many Too Many"	1978	Ken O'Neill
"Turn It On Again"	1980	Stuart Orme
"Duchess"	1980	Stuart Orme
"Misunderstanding"	1980	Stuart Orme
"Abacab"	1981	B. Rymer
"No Reply at All"	1981	Stuart Orme
"Keep It Dark"	1981	Stuart Orme
"Man on the Corner"	1981	Stuart Orme
"Mama"	1983	Stuart Orme
"Illegal Alien"	1983	Stuart Orme
"That's All"	1983	Jim Yukich
"Home by the Sea / Second Home by the Sea"	1984	Jim Yukich
"Invisible Touch"	1986	Jim Yukich
"In Too Deep"	1986	Jim Yukich
"Throwing It All Away"	1986	Jim Yukich
"Land of Confusion"	1986	Jim Yukich, John Lloyd
"Tonight, Tonight, Tonight"	1987	Jim Yukich
"Anything She Does"	1987	Jim Yukich
"No Son of Mine"	1991	Jim Yukich
"I Can't Dance"	1991	Jim Yukich
"Hold on My Heart"	1992	Jim Yukich
"Jesus He Knows Me"	1992	Jim Yukich
"Tell Me Why"	1993	Jim Yukich
"Congo"	1997	Howard Greenhalgh
"Shipwrecked"	1997	Greg Masuak
"Not About Us"	1998	Mike Kaufman
"The Carpet Crawlers 1999"	1999	Tom Baxandall
