= Platinum Collection (Genesis album) =

Compilation album by Genesis
- Released: 29 November 2004 (UK); 13 September 2005 (US)
- Recorded: 1970–1997
- Genres: Progressive rock; pop rock; art rock
- Length: 234.37
- Labels: Virgin (UK); Atlantic/Rhino (US)
- Producers: Genesis; Nick Davis; Hugh Padgham; David Hentschel; John Burns; David Hitchcock; John Anthony

Genesis chronology
Genesis Archive 2: 1976–1992 (2000)	Platinum Collection (2004)	Genesis 1976–1982 (2007)

Professional ratings
Review scores
Source	Rating
AllMusic	4/5 stars

Platinum Collection is a career-spanning compilation album by the English rock band Genesis. It was released on 29 November 2004 in the United Kingdom and 13 September 2005 in the United States.

The set consists of three CDs that serve as an overview of Genesis' career from their early years with Peter Gabriel as lead singer and Anthony Phillips, followed by Steve Hackett, on guitar, continuing through the era with drummer Phil Collins as lead singer, with Hackett departing early in this period, to their most recent recordings with Ray Wilson as lead singer. The collection is mostly sequenced in reverse chronological order except for the most recent track, the title track of the Calling All Stations album, being placed at the end of the first disc. The majority of the tracks were newly remixed by studio collaborator Nick Davis.

Featuring at least one track from every studio album (with the exception of their 1969 debut From Genesis to Revelation) from 1970's Trespass to 1997's Calling All Stations, Platinum Collection stands as the most comprehensive Genesis retrospective available. Upon its release, it reached No. 21 in the UK and No. 100 in the US.

From left to right, the cover features pictures used on the albums We Can't Dance (1991), Nursery Cryme (1971), A Trick of the Tail (1976), Foxtrot (1972), Duke (1980), and Invisible Touch (1986).

The Video Show DVD was released as a companion to the Platinum Collection.

== Track listing ==
All tracks are written by Tony Banks, Phil Collins and Mike Rutherford, except where noted.

Disc one
No.	Title	Writer(s)	Original record	Length
1.	"No Son of Mine"		We Can't Dance (1991)	6:36
2.	"I Can't Dance"		We Can't Dance	4:01
3.	"Jesus He Knows Me"		We Can't Dance	4:18
4.	"Hold on My Heart"		We Can't Dance	4:38
5.	"Invisible Touch"		Invisible Touch (1986)	3:28
6.	"Throwing It All Away"		Invisible Touch	3:50
7.	"Tonight, Tonight, Tonight"		Invisible Touch (edited version first released on Turn It On Again: The Hits (1999))	4:30
8.	"Land of Confusion"		Invisible Touch	4:46
9.	"In Too Deep"		Invisible Touch	4:57
10.	"Mama"		Genesis (1983)	6:49
11.	"That's All"		Genesis	4:25
12.	"Home by the Sea"		Genesis	5:08
13.	"Second Home by the Sea"		Genesis	6:06
14.	"Illegal Alien" (Nick Davis remix)		Genesis	5:17
15.	"Paperlate" (Nick Davis remix)		3×3 (1982)	3:24
16.	"Calling All Stations"	Tony Banks; Mike Rutherford	Calling All Stations (1997)	5:45
Total length:				77:58

Disc two
No.	Title	Writer(s)	Original record	Length
1.	"Abacab" (Nick Davis remix)		Abacab (1981)	6:55
2.	"Keep It Dark" (Nick Davis remix)		Abacab	4:35
3.	"Turn It On Again" (Nick Davis remix)		Duke (1980)	3:51
4.	"Behind the Lines"		Duke	5:43
5.	"Duchess" (Nick Davis remix)		Duke	6:07
6.	"Misunderstanding" (Nick Davis remix)	Phil Collins	Duke	3:14
7.	"Many Too Many" (Nick Davis remix)	Banks	...And Then There Were Three... (1978)	3:35
8.	"Follow You Follow Me" (Nick Davis remix)		...And Then There Were Three...	4:09
9.	"Undertow" (Nick Davis remix)	Banks	...And Then There Were Three...	4:47
10.	"...In That Quiet Earth" (Nick Davis remix)	Banks; Collins; Steve Hackett; Rutherford	Wind & Wuthering (1976)	4:56
11.	"Afterglow" (Nick Davis remix)	Banks	Wind & Wuthering	4:09
12.	"Your Own Special Way"	Rutherford	Wind & Wuthering	6:19
13.	"A Trick of the Tail" (Nick Davis remix)	Banks	A Trick of the Tail (1976)	4:36
14.	"Ripples..." (Nick Davis remix)	Banks; Rutherford	A Trick of the Tail	8:08
15.	"Los Endos" (Nick Davis remix)	Banks; Collins; Hackett; Rutherford	A Trick of the Tail	5:47
Total length:				76:51

Disc three
No.	Title	Writer(s)	Original record	Length
1.	"The Lamb Lies Down on Broadway" (Nick Davis remix)	Banks; Collins; Peter Gabriel; Hackett; Rutherford	The Lamb Lies Down on Broadway (1974)	4:50
2.	"Counting Out Time" (Nick Davis remix)	Banks; Collins; Gabriel; Hackett; Rutherford	The Lamb Lies Down on Broadway	3:36
3.	"The Carpet Crawlers" (Nick Davis remix)	Banks; Collins; Gabriel; Hackett; Rutherford	The Lamb Lies Down on Broadway	5:01
4.	"Firth of Fifth" (Nick Davis remix)	Banks; Collins; Gabriel; Hackett; Rutherford	Selling England by the Pound (1973)	9:29
5.	"The Cinema Show" (Nick Davis remix)	Banks; Collins; Gabriel; Hackett; Rutherford	Selling England by the Pound	10:49
6.	"I Know What I Like (In Your Wardrobe)" (Nick Davis remix)	Banks; Collins; Gabriel; Hackett; Rutherford	Selling England by the Pound	3:54
7.	"Supper's Ready"	Banks; Collins; Gabriel; Hackett; Rutherford	Foxtrot (1972)	22:52
8.	"The Musical Box" (Nick Davis remix)	Banks; Collins; Gabriel; Hackett; Rutherford	Nursery Cryme (1971)	10:24
9.	"The Knife" (Nick Davis remix)	Banks; Gabriel; Anthony Phillips; Rutherford	Trespass (1970)	8:53
Total length:				79:48

== Personnel ==
Genesis

- Tony Banks – keyboards
- Mike Rutherford – guitars, bass
- Phil Collins – drums on all discs except disc 1 track 16 and disc 3 track 9, vocals on disc 1 (except on track 16) and on disc 2, backing vocals on disc 3 (except on track 9)
- Peter Gabriel – lead vocals, flute on disc 3
- Anthony Phillips – guitars on disc 3 track 9
- Steve Hackett – guitars on disc 2 from track 9 and on disc 3 (except on track 9)
- Ray Wilson – vocals on disc 1 track 16
- John Mayhew – drums on disc 3 track 9

Additional personnel

- Nir Zidkyahu – drums on disc 1 track 16
- Brian Eno – Enossifications on disc 3 track 2

== Charts ==
Chart (2004–2005)	Peak position
Belgian Albums (Ultratop Flanders)	40
Belgian Albums (Ultratop Wallonia)	60
Dutch Albums (Album Top 100)	4
German Albums (Offizielle Top 100)	15
Finnish Albums (Suomen virallinen lista)	27
Italian Albums (FIMI)	52
New Zealand Albums (RMNZ)	24
Portuguese Albums (AFP)	16
Scottish Albums (Official Charts)	24
Swiss Albums (Schweizer Hitparade)	72
UK Albums (Official Charts)	21
US Billboard 200	100

== Certifications ==
Region	Certification	Certified units/sales
Germany (BVMI)	Gold	100,000^{^}
United Kingdom (BPI)	Platinum	300,000^{^}
^{^} Shipments figures based on certification alone.
