= Turn It On Again: The Hits =

Greatest hits album by Genesis
- Released: 25 October 1999
- Recorded: 1973–1999 (Original); 1970–1999 (Tour Edition)
- Genres: Progressive rock, art rock, pop rock
- Length: 78:37
- Labels: Virgin; Atlantic (US/Canada)
- Producers: Tony Banks; Phil Collins; Mike Rutherford; David Hentschel; Hugh Padgham; Nick Davis; Peter Gabriel; Steve Hackett; John Burns; Trevor Horn
- Compiler: Geoff Callingham

Genesis chronology
Genesis Archive 1967–75 (1998)	Turn It On Again: The Hits (1999)	Genesis Archive 2: 1976–1992 (2000)

The Tour Edition (2007)

Singles from Turn It On Again: The Hits
- 1. "The Carpet Crawlers 1999" Released: 2 November 1999

Professional ratings
Review scores
Source	Rating
AllMusic	4/5 stars
Sputnikmusic	3.2/5 stars

Turn It On Again: The Hits is a greatest hits album by the English rock band Genesis. The album was originally released as a single album on 25 October 1999 by Virgin Records in the UK and on 26 October 1999 by Atlantic Records in the US.

In 2007, an expanded two-disc edition, subtitled The Tour Edition, was released to promote the Turn It On Again: The Tour reunion. All tracks except "The Carpet Crawlers 1999" were remixed by Nick Davis. Besides the 2-CD version, a 2-CD + DVD version was issued, which included The Video Show DVD.

== Album profile ==
All tracks feature the long-lasting Banks-Collins-Rutherford lineup of Genesis, with the exception of "I Know What I Like (In Your Wardrobe)" and "The Carpet Crawlers 1999", which feature the Banks-Collins-Gabriel-Hackett-Rutherford lineup, and "Congo", which features the Banks-Rutherford-Wilson lineup.

Upon its release, Turn It On Again: The Hits reached No. 4 on the UK Albums Chart and No. 65 on the US Billboard 200, where it achieved gold record status.

In 2007, The Tour Edition was also successful, re-entering the UK charts at No. 14 and the following week climbing to No. 5. The Tour Edition was released in the US on 11 September replacing The Platinum Collection.

The seven letters of the Genesis logo on the cover are parts of the different album cover logos over the years. They are as follows:

- The "G" from ...And Then There Were Three...
- The first "E" from the second "E" on We Can't Dance (the first "E" on that album's cover was reversed)
- The "N" from Calling All Stations (with a different colour scheme; this was reverted on the 2007 re-issue)
- The second "E" from The Lamb Lies Down on Broadway
- The first "S" from Duke
- The "I" from Genesis
- The second "S" from Invisible Touch

The band's official website has taken to using a similar format for its homepage; when the mouse is moved over each letter, the picture changes.

== Track listing ==
All songs composed by Tony Banks, Phil Collins and Mike Rutherford, except where indicated.

=== Original release (1999) ===
No.	Title	Writer(s)	Origin	Length
1.	"Turn It On Again"		Duke (1980)	3:50
2.	"Invisible Touch"		Invisible Touch (1986)	3:27
3.	"Mama" (Radio edit)		Genesis (1983)	5:19
4.	"Land of Confusion"		Invisible Touch	4:45
5.	"I Can't Dance"		We Can't Dance (1991)	4:00
6.	"Follow You Follow Me"		...And Then There Were Three... (1978)	3:59
7.	"Hold on My Heart"		We Can't Dance	4:38
8.	"Abacab" (UK single edit)		Abacab (1981)	4:10
9.	"I Know What I Like (In Your Wardrobe)"	Tony Banks; Phil Collins; Peter Gabriel; Steve Hackett; Mike Rutherford	Selling England by the Pound (1973)	4:05
10.	"No Son of Mine" (Edited version)		We Can't Dance	5:44
11.	"Tonight, Tonight, Tonight" (New edit of single version)		Invisible Touch	4:28
12.	"In Too Deep"		Invisible Touch	4:57
13.	"Congo" (Single version)	Tony Banks; Mike Rutherford	...Calling All Stations... (1997)	4:03
14.	"Jesus He Knows Me" (Single mix)		We Can't Dance	4:16
15.	"That's All"		Genesis	4:25
16.	"Misunderstanding"	Phil Collins	Duke	3:15
17.	"Throwing It All Away"		Invisible Touch	3:49
18.	"The Carpet Crawlers 1999" (newly recorded version with same lineup as original 1974 version)	Tony Banks; Phil Collins; Peter Gabriel; Steve Hackett; Mike Rutherford	The Lamb Lies Down on Broadway (1974)	5:39
Total length:				1:18:37

=== The Tour Edition release (2007) ===
CD one
No.	Title	Writer(s)	Origin	Length
1.	"Turn It On Again"		Duke	3:49
2.	"No Son of Mine" (single edit)		We Can't Dance	5:46
3.	"I Can't Dance"		We Can't Dance	4:00
4.	"Hold on My Heart"		We Can't Dance	4:38
5.	"Jesus He Knows Me" (Single mix)		We Can't Dance	4:16
6.	"Tell Me Why"		We Can't Dance	4:59
7.	"Invisible Touch"		Invisible Touch	3:28
8.	"Land of Confusion"		Invisible Touch	4:46
9.	"Tonight, Tonight, Tonight" (New edit of single version)		Invisible Touch	4:28
10.	"In Too Deep"		Invisible Touch	4:58
11.	"Throwing It All Away"		Invisible Touch	3:50
12.	"Mama" (Radio edit)		Genesis	5:18
13.	"That's All"		Genesis	4:24
14.	"Illegal Alien"		Genesis	5:16
15.	"Abacab" (UK single edit)		Abacab	4:10
16.	"No Reply at All"		Abacab	4:33
17.	"The Carpet Crawlers 1999"	Tony Banks; Phil Collins; Peter Gabriel; Steve Hackett; Mike Rutherford	The Lamb Lies Down on Broadway (1974)	5:40
Total length:				74:58

CD two
No.	Title	Writer(s)	Origin	Length
1.	"Paperlate"		3×3 EP (1982)	3:25
2.	"Keep It Dark"		Abacab	4:32
3.	"Man on the Corner"	Phil Collins	Abacab	4:27
4.	"Duchess" (Single version)		Duke	4:20
5.	"Misunderstanding"	Phil Collins	Duke	3:11
6.	"Follow You, Follow Me"		...And Then There Were Three...	3:59
7.	"Many Too Many"	Tony Banks	...And Then There Were Three...	3:31
8.	"Your Own Special Way"	Mike Rutherford	Wind & Wuthering, 1976	6:18
9.	"Afterglow"	Tony Banks	Wind & Wuthering	4:11
10.	"Pigeons"		Spot the Pigeon EP, 1977	3:15
11.	"Inside and Out"	Tony Banks; Phil Collins; Steve Hackett; Mike Rutherford	Spot the Pigeon EP	6:48
12.	"A Trick of the Tail"	Tony Banks	A Trick of the Tail, 1976	4:34
13.	"Counting Out Time"	Tony Banks; Phil Collins; Peter Gabriel; Steve Hackett; Mike Rutherford	The Lamb Lies Down on Broadway	3:40
14.	"I Know What I Like (In Your Wardrobe)"	Tony Banks; Phil Collins; Peter Gabriel; Steve Hackett; Mike Rutherford	Selling England by the Pound	4:08
15.	"Happy the Man"	Tony Banks; Phil Collins; Peter Gabriel; Steve Hackett; Mike Rutherford	Non-album single (1971)	3:08
16.	"The Knife (Part 1)" (single version)	Tony Banks; Peter Gabriel; Anthony Phillips; Mike Rutherford	Trespass, 1970	3:17
17.	"Congo" (Single version)	Tony Banks; Mike Rutherford	...Calling All Stations...	4:04
Total length:				68:08

=== The Tour Edition 2-CD + DVD (2007) ===
CDs same as 2-CD release

DVD
No.	Title	Length
1.	"The Video Show"

== Personnel ==
- Tony Banks – keyboards, synthesizer, piano and 12-string acoustic guitar, backing vocals
- Mike Rutherford – bass, electric guitar, 12-string acoustic guitar, electric sitar and backing vocals
- Phil Collins – vocals, drums and percussion (except on "Congo" and "The Knife")
- Steve Hackett – lead guitar on "I Know What I Like", "The Carpet Crawlers", "Counting out Time", "Happy the Man", "Your Own Special Way", "Afterglow, "Pigeons", "Inside and Out" and "A Trick of the Tail"
- Peter Gabriel – vocals and flute on "I Know What I Like", "The Carpet Crawlers", "Counting out Time", "Happy the Man" and "The Knife"
- Anthony Phillips – lead guitar on "The Knife"
- John Mayhew – drums on "The Knife"
- Ray Wilson – vocals on "Congo"

Additional personnel

- Nir Zidkyahu – drums on "Congo"
- Phenix Horns – horns on "No Reply At All"

== Charts ==
=== Weekly charts ===
Chart (1999)	Peak position
Australian Albums (ARIA)	98
Austrian Albums (Ö3 Austria)	6
Belgian Albums (Ultratop Flanders)	24
Belgian Albums (Ultratop Wallonia)	26
Canada Top Albums/CDs (RPM)	28
German Albums (Offizielle Top 100)	1
Japanese Albums (Oricon)	92
New Zealand Albums (RMNZ)	15
Norwegian Albums (VG-lista)	1
Scottish Albums (Official Charts)	7
Swedish Albums (Sverigetopplistan)	15
UK Albums (Official Charts)	4
US Billboard 200	65

Chart (2024)	Peak position
Croatian International Albums (HDU)	25
Hungarian Albums (MAHASZ)	23

=== Year-end charts ===
Chart (1999)	Position
German Albums (Offizielle Top 100)	54
UK Albums (OCC)	40

Chart (2007)	Position
German Albums (Offizielle Top 100)	97

== Certifications ==
Sales certifications for Turn It On Again: The Hits
Region	Certification	Certified units/sales
Denmark (IFPI Danmark)	Gold	25,000^{^}
France (SNEP)	Gold	100,000^{*}
Germany (BVMI)	Platinum	300,000^{^}
Netherlands (NVPI)	Gold	50,000^{^}
New Zealand (RMNZ)	Platinum	15,000^{^}
Spain (Promusicae)	Gold	50,000^{^}
Switzerland (IFPI Switzerland)	Gold	25,000^{^}
United Kingdom (BPI)	2× Platinum	600,000^{*}
United States (RIAA)	Gold	500,000^{^}
Summaries
Europe (IFPI)	Platinum	1,000,000^{*}
^{*} Sales figures based on certification alone.^{^} Shipments figures based on certification alone.
