= Genesis Live in London 1980 =

2007 live album

Genesis: Live in London 1980
- Directed by: John Burrowes
- Starring: Genesis
- Music by: Genesis
- Release date: 2007
- Running time: 39 minutes
- Country: UK
- Language: English

Genesis Live in London 1980 is a short concert film by the progressive rock band Genesis. It was filmed by the BBC at the Lyceum Theatre in London on 7 May 1980, but was not released until 2007 (which saw only a partial release). The show features the band performing live during the Duke tour. DVDs of the full show have been widely available for a number of years and are of generally less-than-standard DVD quality and some even have tracks missing, most frequently "The Knife". A 39-minute remastered excerpt from this concert was included on the DVD of the 2007 re-issue of Duke in higher quality and is the only officially released version to date; this re-issue was originally part of the Genesis 1976–1982 box set.

On 3 March 2023, the concert received its first mostly-complete official release as part of the BBC Broadcasts boxset.

== Track list ==
=== 2007 Duke DVD release ===
1. "Behind the Lines" - 5:23
2. "Duchess" - 7:01
3. "Guide Vocal" - 1:26
4. "In the Cage" - 7:32
5. "Afterglow" - 4:39
6. "Dance on a Volcano" - 5:31
7. "Los Endos" - 7:18

=== 2023 CD release ===
1. "Deep in the Motherlode"
2. "Dancing with the Moonlit Knight [Excerpt]"
3. "The Carpet Crawlers"
4. "One for the Vine/The Story of Albert" (from 6 May 1980 show)
5. "Behind the Lines"
6. "Duchess"
7. "Guide Vocal"
8. "Turn It On Again"
9. "Duke's Travels"
10. "Duke's End"
11. "Say It's Alright Joe"
12. "The Lady Lies"
13. "Ripples..."
14. Medley:
  1. "In The Cage"
  2. "The Colony of Slippermen (Part C: The Raven)"
  3. "Afterglow"
15. "Follow You Follow Me"
16. "I Know What I Like (In Your Wardrobe)"
17. "The Knife" [Abridged version]

=== Full concert setlist ===
The full setlist for the concert on 7 May 1980 is as follows:

1. "Deep in the Motherlode"
2. "Dancing with the Moonlit Knight [Excerpt]"
3. "The Carpet Crawlers"
4. "Squonk"
5. "One for the Vine/The Story of Albert" (from 6 May 1980 show)
6. "Behind the Lines"
7. "Duchess"
8. "Guide Vocal"
9. "Turn It On Again"
10. "Duke's Travels"
11. "Duke's End"
12. "Say It's Alright Joe"
13. "The Lady Lies"
14. "Ripples..."
15. Medley:
  1. "In The Cage"
  2. "The Colony of Slippermen (Part C: The Raven)"
  3. "Afterglow"
16. "Follow You Follow Me"
17. "Dance on a Volcano" / "Drum Duet"
18. "Los Endos"
19. "I Know What I Like (In Your Wardrobe)"
20. "The Knife" [Abridged version]

== Personnel ==
Genesis

- Phil Collins – lead vocals, drums, percussion, drum machine
- Mike Rutherford – 12-string rhythm guitar, lead guitar, bass, backing vocals
- Tony Banks – keyboards, synthesisers, backing vocals

with:

- Daryl Stuermer – lead guitar, bass
- Chester Thompson – drums, percussion
