= Genesis 1976–1982 =

2007 compilation album by Genesis

Box set by Genesis
- Released: 2 April 2007 (Europe); 15 May 2007 (North America)
- Recorded: 1975–1982
- Genres: Progressive rock; art rock
- Length: Audio: 5:15:51; Video: 4:42:29
- Labels: Virgin/EMI (Europe & Japan); Atlantic/Rhino (North America)
- Producers: Genesis, David Hentschel

Genesis chronology
Platinum Collection (2004)	Genesis 1976–1982 (2007)	Genesis 1983–1998 (2007)

Professional ratings
Review scores
Source	Rating
AllMusic	4/5 stars

Genesis 1976–1982 is a box set of five studio albums by Genesis. It was released on 2 April 2007 in Europe and Japan by Virgin/EMI and on 15 May 2007 in North America by Atlantic/Rhino. The 6-CD/6-DVD box set includes newly remixed versions of the albums A Trick of the Tail, Wind & Wuthering, ...And Then There Were Three..., Duke, and Abacab. The sixth pair of discs includes B-side songs.

Each CD also has an associated DVD which features audio versions of the albums in 5.1 surround sound, as well as videos for songs from that album or tour, new interviews and photo galleries.

== Audio formats ==
In November 2006 Banks, Rutherford, and Collins announced they were reforming Genesis for the 2007 Turn It On Again Tour. The announcement coincided with the release of three box sets containing digital remasters of the band's studio output across 2007 by EMI Records, containing new stereo and 5.1 surround sound mixes by producer and engineer Nick Davis.

In the European and Japanese releases of this box set, the CDs are hybrid SACD/CDs. The SACD layer is a multichannel surround sound remix.

In the Canadian and U.S. releases of this box set, standard CDs with no SACD layer are included.

In all versions of the box set, the DVDs are DVD-Video format (not DVD-Audio), although they contain both audio and video tracks. These DVDs include three audio mixes: DTS 5.1-channel surround sound, Dolby Digital 5.1-channel surround sound, and Dolby Digital stereo. The DTS surround sound is a slightly compressed version of the surround sound on the SACDs, and the Dolby surround sound is a slightly inferior quality to the DTS.

In November 2012, a 6LP Vinyl Boxset was issued in the United Kingdom. It features the 2007 remasters on 180g platters.

All of the audio tracks on these CDs were remixed in stereo and surround sound by producer Nick Davis, with the sole exception of "Say It's Alright Joe", which was not remixed because the band was unable to locate the multitrack recordings.

== Track listing ==
=== A Trick of the Tail ===
CD

1	"Dance on a Volcano"	5:57
2	"Entangled"	6:28
3	"Squonk"	6:27
4	"Mad Man Moon"	7:35
5	"Robbery, Assault and Battery"	6:19
6	"Ripples"	8:05
7	"A Trick of the Tail"	4:34
8	"Los Endos"	5:52
	Total	51:04

DVD

1	Videos			
	"Robbery, Assault & Battery"	1976	6:19	
	"Ripples"	1976	8:01	
	"A Trick of the Tail"	1976	4:24	
2	Reissues Interview	2007	14:18	
3	Genesis in Concert	1976	42:36	Originally released on VHS in 1977
	"I Know What I Like (In Your Wardrobe)"			
	"Fly on a Windshield (Part 2)"			
	"The Carpet Crawlers"			
	"The Cinema Show (Part 2)"			
	"Entangled"			
	"Supper's Ready (Part 2)"			
	"Los Endos"			
4	White Rocks' Premiere Programme	1977		8-page gallery
	Total		1:15:38	

=== Wind & Wuthering ===
CD

1	"Eleventh Earl of Mar"	7:41
2	"One for the Vine"	10:00
3	"Your Own Special Way"	6:19
4	"Wot Gorilla?"	3:20
5	"All in a Mouse's Night"	6:37
6	"Blood on the Rooftops"	5:27
7	"Unquiet Slumbers for the Sleepers..."	2:23
8	"...In That Quiet Earth"	4:50
9	"Afterglow"	4:12
	Total	50:49

DVD

1	Reissues Interview	2007	14:26	
2	U.S. Television Bootleg Video	1977	8:07	
	"Your Own Special Way"			
	"Afterglow"			
3	Japanese Television Bootleg Video	1977	7:38	
	"Eleventh Earl of Mar"			
	"One for the Vine"			
	"Your Own Special Way"			
4	World Tour Programme	1977		13-page gallery
	Total		30:11	

=== ...And Then There Were Three... ===
CD

1	"Down and Out"	5:25
2	"Undertow"	4:46
3	"Ballad of Big"	4:50
4	"Snowbound"	4:31
5	"Burning Rope"	7:10
6	"Deep in the Motherlode"	5:15
7	"Many Too Many"	3:31
8	"Scenes from a Night's Dream"	3:30
9	"Say It's Alright Joe"	4:21
10	"The Lady Lies"	6:08
11	"Follow You Follow Me"	3:59
	Total	53:27

DVD

1	Videos			
	"Many Too Many"	1978	3:33	
	"Follow You Follow Me"	1978	3:58	
2	Reissues Interview	2007	13:03	
3	Three Dates with Genesis	1978	48:50	BBC documentary
4	Japanese Tour Programme	1978		15-page gallery
5	Knebworth Programme	1978		4-page gallery
6	German Festival Programme	1978		10-page gallery
	Total		1:09:24	

=== Duke ===
CD

1	"Behind the Lines"	5:31
2	"Duchess"	6:26
3	"Guide Vocal"	1:35
4	"Man of Our Times"	5:34
5	"Misunderstanding"	3:13
6	"Heathaze"	4:59
7	"Turn It On Again"	3:50
8	"Alone Tonight"	3:56
9	"Cul-De-Sac"	5:05
10	"Please Don't Ask"	4:01
11	"Duke's Travels"	8:40
12	"Duke's End"	2:08
	Total	54:58

DVD

1	Videos			
	"Duchess"	1980	3:55	
	"Misunderstanding"	1980	3:08	
	"Turn It On Again"	1980	3:47	
2	Reissues Interview	2007	18:46	
3	Live at the Lyceum, London	1980	38:48	
	"Behind the Lines"			
	"Duchess"			
	"Guide Vocal"			
	"In the Cage"			
	"Afterglow"			
	"Dance on a Volcano"			
	"Los Endos"			
4	World Tour Programme	1980		16-page gallery
	Total		1:08:24	

=== Abacab ===
CD

1	"Abacab"	7:02
2	"No Reply at All"	4:40
3	"Me and Sarah Jane"	6:00
4	"Keep It Dark"	4:32
5	"Dodo/Lurker"	7:30
6	"Who Dunnit?"	3:23
7	"Man on the Corner"	4:27
8	"Like it or Not"	4:57
9	"Another Record"	4:29
	Total	47:00

DVD

1	Videos			
	"Abacab"	1981	4:12	
	"No Reply at All"	1981	4:02	
	"Keep it Dark"	1981	4:11	
	"Man on the Corner"	1982	3:39	
2	Reissues Interview	2007	14:49	
3	World Tour Programme	1981		15-page gallery
	Total		30:53	

=== Extra Tracks 1976 to 1982 ===
CD

1	"Paperlate"	1982	3:20	From the 3×3 EP
2	"Evidence of Autumn"	1980	4:58	B-side on the "Misunderstanding" single
3	"Pigeons"	1977	3:12	From the Spot the Pigeon EP
4	"You Might Recall"	1982	5:30	From the 3×3 EP
5	"Naminanu"	1981	3:52	B-side on the "Keep It Dark" single
6	"Inside and Out"	1977	6:45	From the Spot the Pigeon EP
7	"Vancouver"	1978	3:01	B-side on the "Many Too Many" single
8	"Me and Virgil"	1982	6:18	From the 3×3 EP. Also available on some issues of Three Sides Live.
9	"It's Yourself"	1977	6:15	B-side on the "Your Own Special Way" single (modified)
10	"Match of the Day"	1977	3:24	From the Spot the Pigeon EP
11	"Open Door"	1980	4:08	B-side on the "Duchess" single
12	"The Day the Light Went Out"	1978	3:12	B-side on the "Many Too Many" single
13	"Submarine"	1982	4:38	B-side on the "Man on the Corner" single
	Total		58:33	

DVD

1	"Paperlate" video	1982	3:07
2	Reissues Interview	2007	4:52
	Total		7:59

== Personnel ==
- Tony Banks – keyboards, backing vocals
- Phil Collins – drums, percussion, lead and backing vocals
- Mike Rutherford – guitars, bass
- Steve Hackett – guitars on A Trick of the Tail, Wind & Wuthering, and tracks 3, 6, 9, 10 on CD 6

Additional personnel

- David Hentschel – backing vocals on Duke
- EWF Horns – horns on "No Reply at All" and "Paperlate"

== Formats ==
UK/EU Version: CD/SACD hybrid + DVD (PAL)
US/Canadian Version: CD + DVD (NTSC)
Japanese Version: CD/SACD hybrid + DVD (NTSC)
