= The Video Show =

Video by Genesis
- Released: 29 November 2004 (UK); 13 September 2005 (US)
- Genre: Rock, progressive rock
- Length: 156 min
- Label: Virgin
- Producer: various

Genesis chronology
Genesis Live at Wembley Stadium (2003)	The Video Show (2004)	When in Rome 2007 (2008)

Professional ratings
Review scores
Source	Rating
Allmusic	4.5/5 stars
Classic Rock	4/5 stars
News of the World	(favorable)

The Video Show (a.k.a. The Cinema Show: A Video Anthology) is a DVD by British band Genesis. Released on 29 November 2004 in the UK and 13 September 2005 in North America, it compiles all of the band's music videos. The track listing begins at the We Can't Dance (1991) album and goes backwards in time to A Trick of the Tail (1976) - the first album for which Genesis made music videos - before jumping to post-We Can't Dance material, which appears at the end of the track listing going forwards in time.

While the DVD's packaging says "The Video Show", the introduction to the DVD menu says "The Cinema Show: A Video Anthology", indicating that the name was changed after the DVD was finalised.

All the tracks have had their audio replaced with the new 5.1 Surround Sound and Stereo Remixes featured in the SACD/DVD re-releases. Because of this, some of the videos are missing their original sound effects heard during songs like "Land of Confusion" and "I Can't Dance". "Man on the Corner" was originally a live recorded video while the DVD dubs the footage with the studio track.

== Track listing ==
1. "No Son of Mine" (We Can't Dance, 1991)
  - Directed by Jim Yukich, 1991
2. "I Can't Dance" (We Can't Dance, 1991)
  - Directed by Jim Yukich, 1991
3. "Hold on My Heart" (We Can't Dance, 1991)
  - Directed by Jim Yukich, 1992
4. "Jesus He Knows Me" (We Can't Dance, 1991)
  - Directed by Jim Yukich, 1992
5. "Tell Me Why" (We Can't Dance, 1991)
  - Directed by Jim Yukich, 1993
6. "Invisible Touch" (Invisible Touch, 1986)
  - Directed by Jim Yukich, 1986
7. "Throwing It All Away" (Invisible Touch, 1986)
  - Directed by Jim Yukich, 1986
8. "Land of Confusion" (Invisible Touch, 1986)
  - Directed by Jim Yukich and John Lloyd, 1986
9. "Tonight, Tonight, Tonight" (Invisible Touch, 1986)
  - Directed by Jim Yukich, 1987
10. "Anything She Does" (Invisible Touch, 1986)
  - Directed by Jim Yukich, 1987
11. "In Too Deep" (Invisible Touch, 1986)
  - Directed by Jim Yukich, 1986
12. "That's All" (Genesis, 1983)
  - Directed by Jim Yukich, 1983
13. "Mama" (Genesis, 1983)
  - Directed by Stuart Orme, 1983
14. "Illegal Alien" (Genesis, 1983)
  - Directed by Stuart Orme, 1983
15. "Home by the Sea/Second Home by the Sea" (Genesis, 1983)
  - Directed by Jim Yukich, 1983
16. "Paperlate" (3×3, 1982)
  - From Top of the Pops, 1982
17. "Abacab" (Abacab, 1981)
  - Directed by B. Rymer, 1981
18. "Keep It Dark" (Abacab, 1981)
  - Directed by Stuart Orme, 1981
19. "No Reply at All" (Abacab, 1981)
  - Directed by Stuart Orme, 1981
20. "Man on the Corner" (Abacab, 1981)
  - Directed by Stuart Orme, 1981
21. "Turn It On Again" (Duke, 1980)
  - Directed by Stuart Orme, 1980
22. "Duchess" (Duke, 1980)
  - Directed by Stuart Orme, 1980
23. "Misunderstanding" (Duke, 1980)
  - Directed by Stuart Orme, 1980
24. "Follow You Follow Me" (...And Then There Were Three..., 1978)
  - Directed by B. Rymer, 1978
25. "Many Too Many" (...And Then There Were Three..., 1978)
  - Directed by Ken O'Neill, 1978
26. "A Trick of the Tail" (A Trick of the Tail, 1976)
  - Directed by Bruce Gowers, 1976
27. "Ripples" (A Trick of the Tail, 1976)
  - Directed by Bruce Gowers, 1976
28. "Robbery, Assault and Battery" (A Trick of the Tail, 1976)
  - Directed by Bruce Gowers, 1976
29. "Congo" (Calling All Stations, 1997)
  - Directed by Howard Greenhaigh, 1997
30. "Shipwrecked" (Calling All Stations, 1997)
  - Directed by Greg Masuak, 1997
31. "Not About Us" (Calling All Stations, 1997)
  - Directed by Mike Kaufman, 1998
32. "The Carpet Crawlers 1999" (The Lamb Lies Down on Broadway, 1974; re-recorded for Turn It On Again: The Hits, 1999)
  - Directed by Tom Baxandall, 1999

== Certifications ==
Region	Certification	Certified units/sales
Argentina (CAPIF)	Platinum	8,000^{^}
France (SNEP)	Gold	10,000^{*}
Germany (BVMI)	Platinum	50,000^{^}
United Kingdom (BPI)	Gold	25,000^{^}
^{*} Sales figures based on certification alone.^{^} Shipments figures based on certification alone.
