= Face Value (album) =

1981 studio album by Phil Collins

Studio album by Phil Collins
- Released: 13 February 1981
- Recorded: 1979 (demos); August–December 1980 (overdubs and mix)
- Studios: The Town House, London; Old Croft, Shalford, Surrey; The Village Recorder, Los Angeles
- Genres: Pop rock; R&B; art rock; blue-eyed soul
- Length: 47:49
- Label: Virgin
- Producers: Phil Collins; Hugh Padgham

Phil Collins chronology
Face Value (1981)	Hello, I Must Be Going! (1982)

Singles from Face Value
- 1. "In the Air Tonight" Released: January 1981; 2. "I Missed Again" Released: February 1981; 3. "If Leaving Me Is Easy" Released: May 1981; 4. "Thunder and Lightning" Released: November 1981 (Germany)

Face Value is the debut studio album by the English drummer and singer-songwriter Phil Collins, released on 13 February 1981, by Virgin Records in the United Kingdom and Atlantic Records in North America. After separating from his first wife around 1979, Collins began to write songs during a break in activity from Genesis with much of the material concerning his personal life. The album was recorded from mid-1980 to early 1981 with Collins and Hugh Padgham as producers. Additional musicians include the Phenix Horns, Alphonso Johnson, and Eric Clapton.

Face Value was an instant commercial success and reached No. 1 on the UK Albums Chart for three weeks and No. 7 on the US Billboard 200. It has since sold over five million copies in the US and over 1.5 million in the UK. The album received widespread praise from critics and launched Collins' solo career, the commercial success of which would ultimately outstrip that of Genesis. Its lead single "In the Air Tonight", released in January 1981, reached No. 2 on the UK singles chart and became known for its drum arrangement and use of gated reverb. In January 2016, Face Value was reissued with bonus tracks and new artwork.

== Background and writing ==
By 1978, Phil Collins had been a member of English progressive rock band Genesis for almost eight years. After spending the first five as their drummer, he reluctantly accepted the role of frontman of the group in 1975 following the departure of the band's original singer, Peter Gabriel. Three years later, after departure of guitarist Steve Hackett, Genesis' nine-month world tour to promote ...And Then There Were Three... (1978) became problematic for Collins' wife, Andrea, who complained that he was not at home enough and should he commit to the full tour, she would not be there when he returned. Collins maintained that the band were on the cusp of their international breakthrough and the tour would pay dividends for the future. At the end of the tour, Andrea decided to take their two children to her parents in Vancouver, Canada. In an attempt to save his marriage, Collins moved to Vancouver, but the attempt failed. Collins returned to England in April 1979, with Andrea having agreed to return with the children.

With Genesis members Tony Banks and Mike Rutherford working on their solo albums through 1979, Collins used some of his spare time to write songs. He told Modern Drummer early that year:

One ambition is to do my own album which will have a lot of variety. I write songy [sic] stuff, as well as some from the Brand X area. I'm also hip to what [Brian] Eno does – those kind of soundtracks which I've always been interested in – two or three minutes of just mood. The album, when it does come out, will have a lot of different styles on it.

In his home in Shalford, Surrey, named Old Croft, Collins set up a Sequential Prophet-5 synthesiser, piano, Roland CR-78 drum machine, and an 8-track tape machine in his bedroom, and recorded a collection of demos with backing tracks and early lyrics. He was not concerned with the quality of the recordings as what may have lacked in the recordings would have been salvaged with the emotion in the songs. There were numerous times when Collins stopped recording earlier than planned as the ideas were not working in the studio, forcing him to resume the following day. Collins based the majority of Face Value on the divorce he had endured and used a solo album as an outlet for his feelings.

During the conception of the album, Collins had forged a close friendship with John Martyn and played on Grace and Danger (1980), which contained a similar narrative relating to divorce and relationship breakdown. Some of Collins' material that he had written was performed by Genesis on Duke (1980), including "Misunderstanding", the arrangement of which remained unchanged. He had played "In the Air Tonight" and "If Leaving Me is Easy" to the group, but they were left out as Collins said they were "too simple for the band".

Early album titles included Interiors and Exposure. To release the album, Collins signed a solo contract with Virgin Records for UK distribution. He did so to "leave the nest" and to ensure he could maintain full creative control over the music. Collins also felt that releasing the album on Charisma Records, the same label as Genesis, would have harmed its success due to the preconceived notions people have about bands and labels. Collins thought a new label would benefit the casual listener and appeal to a wider audience. Virgin gave Collins a £65,000 advance on the album.

== Production ==
=== Recording ===
Recording sessions for Face Value took place at the Town House in London and the Village Recorder in Los Angeles between August and December 1980. The demos recorded onto 8-track were transferred onto 24-track for overdubs. According to Classic Albums, in what was considered a controversial move at the time, Collins, who grew up listening to American R&B as a child in Chiswick, decided to incorporate an R&B horn section, hiring the Phenix Horns, who played backup for Earth, Wind & Fire. Collins had asked a contact who knew the group if they were interested in playing, and upon their agreement their leader Thomas "Tom Tom 84" Washington met with Collins and asked him to sing the sections where the horns were to be placed into a tape recorder. The group recorded their parts the following day.

Collins produced the album himself with assistance from Hugh Padgham, who would co-produce several of Collins and Genesis's subsequent albums in the 1980s. Initially he considered George Clinton, Maurice White, or Phil Ramone until he realised that he merely wanted someone to endorse his own ideas. Assistant recording engineer Nick Launay was hired after Collins was impressed with his work with Public Image Ltd. Collins was dissatisfied with initial test cuts of the album, describing them like a Queen album, "big, British and upfront". He then listened to several albums by black musicians including ones by the Jacksons and a collection of soul artists in his own collection, and noticed a common link with technician Mike Reese who worked at a Los Angeles mastering lab. Reese prepared a cut which Collins was satisfied with.

=== Songs ===
The simple style of music on Face Value was attributed by Collins to his fondness for Weather Report's simple melodies and for black music. Collins controversially included drum programming rather than just live drum instrumentation despite his reputation as a drummer. Collins said he wanted to experiment with different sounds and was inspired by the work of his former bandmate Peter Gabriel, who had used drum programming on his last album; Collins was part of these sessions. Many of the songs' arrangements were done by Collins and session arranger Thomas "Tom Tom 84" Washington. He incorporated Indian-styled violins, played by L. Shankar, for additional textures.

The last recording session for Face Value was in January 1981, prior to the release of the first single, "In the Air Tonight". Atlantic CEO Ahmet Ertegun advised Collins to perform drums during the verses and opening of the song, whereas the album version does not feature live drumming until the bridge.

The album features songs of different genres. While technically a rock and pop offering, the basis of many of the tracks lies in R&B with light funk influences, especially in "I'm Not Moving", for which Collins sang his backgrounds with a vocoder. "Droned" and "Hand in Hand" are progressive rock instrumentals, with the first featuring an Indian raga sound, while "Hand in Hand" features jazz elements, a black children's choir from Los Angeles humming the music, and improvisational instrumentation by Collins and the Phenix Horns. "The Roof Is Leaking" has Delta blues and country elements. "Behind the Lines" was originally recorded by Genesis on the Duke album as a progressive rock number. Collins worked up a horn-driven R&B/funk-inspired arrangement after speeding up the tape on the Genesis version and thinking that the sped-up version sounded like a Michael Jackson song. The cover of the Beatles' "Tomorrow Never Knows" includes instruments and vocals playing in reverse while Collins provided multi-layered background vocals and sparse drumming. After the song ends, Collins can be heard quietly singing "Over the Rainbow" in reference to the recent murder of John Lennon; this final song is unlisted on most releases of the album (the original US cassette version being an exception), and marks the only time Collins used a hidden track on one of his own releases.

Four songs Collins wrote during the Face Value sessions were ultimately omitted: "Misunderstanding" and "Please Don't Ask" which appeared in the Genesis album Duke, "How Can You Just Sit There" (which evolved into his 1984 single "Against All Odds (Take a Look at Me Now)"), and what would become "Don't Lose My Number", which would not appear until Collins' third album No Jacket Required in 1985. According to Collins "Don't Let Him Steal Your Heart Away" and "Why Can't It Wait 'Til Morning" (from his 1982 follow-up Hello, I Must Be Going!) were written during the Face Value sessions.

=== Packaging ===
Collins regarded Face Value as a highly personal project, which gave rise to the iconic cover art with Collins' face in extreme close-up, originally intended to symbolise the listener "getting into his head"; the reverse side of the sleeve shows the rear of his head, although the CD version of the album placed this image on the insert card instead. To emphasise the personal nature of the album, Collins also hand wrote all of the liner and sleeve notes, even down to the legal statements on the outer circumference of the centre label of the disc itself. Both of the main visual elements of Face Value – the facial close-up, and the handwritten notes – would become a motif of Collins' subsequent albums until 1996's Dance into the Light. When crediting the musicians in the liner notes, rather than write "Phil Collins", Collins simply wrote "Me", although in future albums he would write his initials "PC".

In January 2016, Face Value was reissued with bonus tracks and new photography in the style of the original but featuring a contemporary Collins.

== Release and commercial performance ==
Face Value was released on 13 February 1981, by Virgin Records in the United Kingdom and Atlantic Records in North America.

The album became an immediate success, reaching No. 1 in the UK, Canada, and other European countries, while peaking in the top ten in the US. "In the Air Tonight" became the album's biggest hit, reaching No. 2 in the UK, No. 1 in three other countries, and becoming a top twenty hit in the US. Other songs such as "I Missed Again" found modest success reaching No. 14 in the UK and No. 19 in the US, while the third single, "If Leaving Me Is Easy", reached No. 17 in the UK but was not released in America. Sales of the album reached five million in the US and went five-times platinum in the UK and ten-times platinum in Canada. No solo tour was produced from this album – Collins immediately resumed working with Genesis for the album Abacab upon the album's completion.

== Critical reception ==
Professional ratings
Review scores
Source	Rating
AllMusic	5/5 stars
The Encyclopedia of Popular Music	5/5 stars
Mojo	4/5 stars
PopMatters	9/10
Q	4/5 stars
Record Mirror	5/5 stars
Rolling Stone	3/5 stars
The Rolling Stone Album Guide	3/5 stars
Sounds	4/5 stars
Uncut	7/10

Robin Smith of Record Mirror highlighted the album's emotional restraint, commenting that it plays less like a statement of "raw emotion" and more like a "diary" of Collins' "disappointments, hopes and fantasies". In Sounds, Hugh Fielder said that it effectively captured Collins' "multi-faceted" musicality with songs ranging "from funky beat to melancholic ballads with occasional pop and avant garde twinges." Melody Maker's Allan Jones considered Face Value a compelling stylistic divergence from Collins' work in Genesis, writing that the album "delights in confounding the familiar parameters" of the band's music. Rolling Stone critic Steve Pond was more reserved in his praise. He complimented Collins for forgoing Genesis' "high-blown conceits" for a simpler sound rooted in "basic pop and R&B", but found that "[his] broken heart is too clearly on his sleeve, and musical missteps abound". Pond nonetheless deemed it "unmistakably the most worthy Genesis product" since Peter Gabriel's 1977 debut album.

In 2000, Face Value was voted number 329 in Colin Larkin's All Time Top 1000 Albums. In a retrospective review for AllMusic, Tim Sendra described Face Value as "Collins' most honest, most compelling work", which "stands as his masterpiece and one of the finest moments of the '80s musical landscape." Writing for Ultimate Classic Rock in 2013, Will Levith called it a "now-classic" album, highlighting in particular "In the Air Tonight", "which just about everybody has played air drums to one time or another", but added, "The project's most forgettable moment, however, is the closing track – an absolutely atrocious cover of 'Tomorrow Never Knows' [...] Why Collins thought it was necessary to lay such a giant turd on an otherwise awesome album is beyond us."

Reviewing the album's 2016 reissue, Uncut's Sharon O'Connell said that Face Value established Collins as a "premier-league" pop and soft rock performer, "nursing only a slight prog hangover", and Mojo's Paul Elliott wrote that it remained Collins' best solo record, noting its deeply personal core themes. Dorset Echo writer Joanna Davis said, "Most of the tracks stand the test of time, but some, like 'If Leaving Me is Easy', belong in the forgotten land of 80s ballads preceded by a saxophone introduction." Dorian Lynskey of The Guardian characterised the album in 2016 as "an intriguing debut, wandering between art-rock and soulful MOR... Face Value's most potent quality was its emotional transparency. Like the pensive portrait on the cover, the songs addressed the listener with unflinching directness."

== Track listing ==
=== Original release ===
All tracks are written by Phil Collins, except where noted.

Side one
No.	Title	Writer(s)	Length
1.	"In the Air Tonight"		5:34
2.	"This Must Be Love"		3:55
3.	"Behind the Lines"	Tony Banks; Collins; Mike Rutherford	3:53
4.	"The Roof Is Leaking"		3:16
5.	"Droned"		2:49
6.	"Hand in Hand"		5:20
Total length:			24:47

Side two
No.	Title	Writer(s)	Length
1.	"I Missed Again"		3:41
2.	"You Know What I Mean"		2:33
3.	"Thunder and Lightning"		4:12
4.	"I'm Not Moving"		2:33
5.	"If Leaving Me Is Easy"		4:54
6.	"Tomorrow Never Knows"	Lennon–McCartney	4:15
7.	"Over the Rainbow" (unlisted, except on cassette release WEA 1981)	E. Y. Harburg; Harold Arlen	0:32
Total length:			22:45

Notes

- Several original vinyl copies have "Play Loud" etched into the album's inner groove where the matrix number is typically found. This may be because the record's baked-in volume is relatively low compared to others'.
- The album was re-released using a flat transfer done by Steve Hoffman for the Audio Fidelity label in 2010.
- A 2-disc remastered version of Face Value was released on 29 January 2016 and contains live songs and demos.

=== Deluxe Edition (2016) ===
Extra Values bonus disc (Disc two of 2016 deluxe edition)
No.	Title	Writer(s)	Length
1.	"Misunderstanding" (live 2004)		4:42
2.	"If Leaving Me Is Easy" (live 1985)		7:23
3.	"In the Air Tonight" (live 1997)		7:51
4.	"Behind the Lines" (live 1985)	Banks; Collins; Rutherford	3:39
5.	"The Roof Is Leaking" (demo 1980)		3:12
6.	"Hand in Hand" (live 1997)		9:47
7.	"I Missed Again" (live 2004)		4:22
8.	"...And So to F..." (live 1982)		6:22
9.	"This Must Be Love" (demo 1980)		3:44
10.	"Please Don't Ask" (demo 1980)		4:01
11.	"Misunderstanding" (demo 1980)		2:53
12.	"Against All Odds" (demo 1980)		2:58

== Demos ==
Some songs were written around this time but have not been fully recorded and included on the record:

- "Please Don't Break My Heart" [demo released in mp3 through website in 2011; parts of the demo evolved into I'm Not Moving]
- "How Can You Sit There? (Against All Odds)" [released on 'Face Value' Reissue Bonus CD in 2016]
- "Misunderstanding" [released on Face Value Reissue Bonus CD in 2016 – Ended up on Genesis' Duke record]
- "Please Don't Ask" [released on Face Value Reissue Bonus CD in 2016 – Ended up on Genesis' Duke record]

== Personnel ==
- Phil Collins – vocals, drums, Roland VP-330 vocoder (1, 6, 10), CR-78 drum machine (1, 6, 12), Prophet-5 synthesizer (1, 2, 5–7, 10–12), Fender Rhodes (1, 2, 9, 11), percussion (2, 10), acoustic piano (4–8, 10), handclaps (5, 9), congas (5), marimba (6), acoustic guitar (13)
- Daryl Stuermer – guitars (1–3, 6, 7, 9, 11, 12), banjo (4), 12-string guitar (5)
- Eric Clapton – guitar (11)
- Joe Partridge – slide guitar (4)
- John Giblin – bass (1, 9, 10, 12)
- Alphonso Johnson – bass (2, 3, 6, 7, 11)
- L. Shankar – violin (1, 5, 7, 12), tamboura (5), "voice drums" (5)
- J. Peter Robinson – Prophet-5 (3)
- Stephen Bishop – background vocals (2)
- Arif Mardin – string arrangements (8, 11)
- EWF Horns – horns
  - Don Myrick – tenor saxophone (3, 6, 7, 9, 12), alto saxophone solo (11)
  - Louis Satterfield – trombone (3, 6, 7, 9, 12)
  - Rahmlee Michael Davis and Michael Harris – trumpets (3, 6, 7, 9, 12), flugelhorns (11)
- Ronnie Scott – tenor saxophone solo (7)
- Music preparation – Maurice Spears
- Other background vocals on tracks 6 and 12 by several children's choirs in Los Angeles
- Strings on tracks 8 and 11 conducted by Martyn Ford
  - Violins – Gavyn Wright (leader), Bill Benhem, Bruce Dukov, David Woodcock, Liz Edwards, Irvine Arditti, Ken Sillitoe, Peter Oxen and Richard Studt
  - Violas – Roger Best, Brian Hawkins and Simon Whistler
  - Cellos – Tony Pleeth, Clive Anstee and Nigel Warren-Green
  - Double bassist: Chris Laurence

Production

- Phil Collins – producer
- Hugh Padgham – assistant producer. engineer
- Nick Launay – assistant engineer (London)
- Karen Siegel – assistant engineer (Los Angeles)
- Trevor Key – photography

== Charts ==
=== Weekly charts ===
Chart (1981)	Peak position
Australian Albums (Kent Music Report)	2
Austrian Albums (Ö3 Austria)	3
Canada Top Albums/CDs (RPM)	1
Dutch Albums (Album Top 100)	2
Finland (The Official Finnish Charts)	14
German Albums (Offizielle Top 100)	2
Italian Albums (Musica e Dischi)	8
New Zealand Albums (RMNZ)	4
Norwegian Albums (VG-lista)	5
Spanish Albums (AFE)	7
Swedish Albums (Sverigetopplistan)	1
UK Albums (Official Charts)	1
US Billboard 200	7

Chart (2016)	Peak position
Belgian Albums (Ultratop Flanders)	54
Belgian Albums (Ultratop Wallonia)	79
French Albums (SNEP)	87
Italian Albums (FIMI)	73
Spanish Albums (Promusicae)	45
Swiss Albums (Schweizer Hitparade)	24

Chart (2026)	Peak position
German Pop Albums (Offizielle Top 100)	8
Hungarian Physical Albums (MAHASZ)	13

=== Year-end charts ===
Chart (1981)	Position
Canada Top Albums/CDs (RPM)	1
US Billboard 200	20

== Certifications and sales ==
Region	Certification	Certified units/sales
Argentina (CAPIF)	Platinum	60,000^{^}
Australia (ARIA)	4× Platinum	280,000^{^}
Austria (IFPI Austria)	Platinum	50,000^{*}
Belgium (BRMA)	Platinum	50,000^{*}
Canada (Music Canada)	Diamond	1,000,000^{^}
France (SNEP)	2× Platinum	600,000^{*}
Germany (BVMI)	7× Gold	1,750,000^{^}
Hong Kong (IFPI Hong Kong)	Gold	10,000^{*}
Netherlands (NVPI)	2× Platinum	200,000^{^}
New Zealand (RMNZ)	Gold	7,500^{^}
Spain (Promusicae)	Platinum	100,000^{^}
Switzerland (IFPI Switzerland)	2× Platinum	100,000^{^}
United Kingdom (BPI)	5× Platinum	1,542,095
United States (RIAA)	5× Platinum	5,000,000^{^}
Summaries
Worldwide	—	12,000,000
^{*} Sales figures based on certification alone.^{^} Shipments figures based on certification alone.

== See also ==
- List of best-selling albums in Germany
