= Behind the Lines (Genesis song) =

1980 song by Genesis

Song by Genesis

from the album Duke
- Released: 28 March 1980
- Recorded: October–December 1979
- Genre: Art rock; progressive rock
- Length: 5:31
- Label: Charisma/Phonogram (UK), Atlantic (US)
- Songwriters: Tony Banks, Phil Collins, Mike Rutherford
- Producers: David Hentschel, Genesis

Audio sample
- file; help

"Behind the Lines"

Song by Phil Collins

from the album Face Value
- Released: 13 February 1981
- Recorded: June 1980 – January 1981
- Genre: R&B; disco; funk-pop
- Length: 3:53
- Label: Virgin (UK); Atlantic (US)
- Songwriters: Tony Banks; Phil Collins; Mike Rutherford
- Producers: Phil Collins; Hugh Padgham

"Behind the Lines" is an art-rock song by the English progressive rock band Genesis, which appears as the opening track on their 1980 album Duke. The group's drummer and vocalist Phil Collins released a re-recorded version on his first solo album Face Value in February 1981.

== Different versions ==
Collins revealed on the Classic Albums documentary on Face Value that his solo remake came about after "recording 'Behind the Lines', we ran the tape back at double speed and suddenly this other song appeared". Collins then set out to re-record the song on Face Value as a Michael Jackson Off the Wall-era disco track featuring the Earth, Wind and Fire horn section, the Phenix Horns.

An edited version appeared as the B-side to "Turn It On Again", the lead single from Duke. This version is billed as "Behind the Lines – Part 2", as it edited out the long instrumental introduction to the song, and is in essence the second half of the original recording.

== Tours ==
"Behind the Lines" was performed on the accompanying tour in 1980, and was also played as the show opener during the Abacab tour in 1981. The song was also played in full (in a medley, between "Dance on a Volcano" and "Follow You Follow Me") on the 1982 Encore tour, and a shorter version was included in an old medley ("Eleventh Earl of Mar"/"Behind the Lines"/"Firth of Fifth"/"The Musical Box") during January 1984 for the Mama Tour. The song was rehearsed and considered the show opener for the We Can't Dance '92 tour.

The instrumental intro was used as an opener on the 2007 Turn It On Again tour. Tony Banks wanted to perform the full version, but Mike Rutherford and Phil Collins disagreed with him, opting to blend "Behind The Lines" with "Duke's End" and "Turn It On Again" as "Duke's Intro." Collins performed his solo version on his Hello I Must Be Going '83, No Jacket Required '85, But Seriously '90 and Both Sides '94/'95 tours.

== The Duke Suite ==
"Behind the Lines" was originally part of a long suite by the band including "Duchess", "Guide Vocal", "Turn it on Again" "Duke's Travels" and "Duke's End". However, it was split up before release.

== Personnel ==
- Tony Banks – keyboards
- Phil Collins – drums, percussion, lead and backing vocals
- Mike Rutherford – guitar, bass
