= Misunderstanding (Genesis song) =

Single by Genesis

from the album Duke
- B-side: "Evidence of Autumn" (UK); "Behind the Lines" (U.S.A.); "Open Door" (Germany); "Duchess" (Netherlands)
- Released: May 1980 (US); 29 August 1980 (UK)
- Recorded: 15 June 1979
- Genre: Rock; AOR; pop
- Length: 3:11 (album version); 3:04 (single version/video - sped up); 4:01 (Three Sides Live version)
- Label: Charisma/Phonogram (UK); Atlantic (US)
- Songwriter: Phil Collins
- Producers: David Hentschel and Genesis

Genesis singles chronology
"Duchess" (1980)	"Misunderstanding" (1980)	"Abacab" (1981)

Audio sample
- "Misunderstanding": file; help

Music video
- "Misunderstanding" on YouTube

"Misunderstanding" is a song by the English rock band Genesis, released on their 1980 album Duke. In the United States it reached #9 in Record World magazine but peaked at #14 in both Billboard and Cash Box. It stalled at a disappointing #42 in the United Kingdom. Its highest charting was in Canada, where it reached No.1 and is ranked as the seventh biggest Canadian hit of 1980. It was also featured on the band's 1982 double-album Three Sides Live, where it led off side three.

== History ==
Originally written by Phil Collins during the production of his debut solo album Face Value, the song ended up being donated (along with "Please Don't Ask") for Duke. The original demo without lyrics was later included on the 2016 reissue of that album. According to Collins, the song was modelled after the Beach Boys' "Sail On, Sailor", Sly and the Family Stone's "Hot Fun in the Summertime" and Toto's "Hold the Line". Tony Banks said of the song: "All three of us were fans of the Beach Boys, so when Phil brought the song to the writing sessions, we thought it would be a fun one to work on. It has a California, summertime, surfer vibe to it that was unlike anything else we'd worked on in the past."

== Reception ==
Record World called it "loveable and instantly consumable", describing it as "AOR-pop."

== Music video ==
A music video, directed by Stuart Orme, was made for the song, featuring Tony Banks and Mike Rutherford playing their instruments (piano and electric guitar respectively) on the back of a truck, with a bearded Collins driving a 1950s model Ford convertible making stops at various locations around Los Angeles (the Capitol Records Tower can be seen in the background and street signs for Hollywood Boulevard are present) looking for his girlfriend (played by Max Factor spokesperson Linda Kendall).

Two different cuts of the video exist: one version featured alternate shots of Collins, as well as alternate shots of his girlfriend peppered throughout (including a shot of her at Griffith Park Observatory). This version was not used on any of the Genesis Music Video collections. Filming took place on location in Los Angeles from 24 to 27 May 1980 during concerts for the band's Duke tour there. Further evidence of the filming dates for the video are the billboards seen throughout, advertising The Hollywood Knights and The Nude Bomb, both films released in May 1980.

== Tour information ==
The song was featured on the U.S. leg of the Duke Tour of 1980, and was also featured on tours to promote future albums Abacab and Genesis. Despite its commercial success, it was dropped from the setlists of all the later tours until 2021, but a verse was sung sometimes in the We Can't Dance Tour's "Old Medley." Collins also played the song in its entirety with a horn section in the U.S. during his First Final Farewell Tour in 2004. The song returned to live performance at the opening night of the North American leg of The Last Domino? tour at Chicago's United Center on 15 November 2021.

== Charts ==
=== Weekly charts ===
Chart (1980)	Peak position
Canada RPM Top Singles	1
UK (OCC)	42
US Billboard Hot 100	14
US Adult Contemporary (Billboard)	32
US Cash Box Top 100	14

=== Year-end charts ===
Chart (1980)	Rank
Canada	7
US (Joel Whitburn's Pop Annual)	101
US Cash Box Top 100	99
US Top Pop Singles (Billboard)	71

== Personnel ==
- Phil Collins – vocals, drums, percussion
- Tony Banks – keyboards
- Mike Rutherford – electric guitar, bass guitar
