= A Trick of the Tail =

Studio album by Genesis
- Released: 13 February 1976
- Recorded: October–November 1975
- Studios: Trident, London
- Genre: Progressive rock
- Length: 51:14
- Labels: Charisma, Atco
- Producers: David Hentschel and Genesis

Genesis chronology
The Lamb Lies Down on Broadway (1974)	A Trick of the Tail (1976)	Wind & Wuthering (1976)

Singles from A Trick of the Tail
- 1. "A Trick of the Tail" Released: March 1976 (UK); 2. "Ripples" / "Entangled" Released: March 1976 (US)

A Trick of the Tail is the seventh studio album by the English progressive rock band Genesis. It was released on 13 February 1976 on Charisma Records and was the first album to feature drummer Phil Collins as lead vocalist following the departure of Peter Gabriel. It was a critical and commercial success in the UK and US, reaching No. 3 and No. 31 respectively.

Following Gabriel's decision to leave the band, the remaining members wanted to carry on to show they could still write and record successful material, as keyboardist Tony Banks and bassist/guitarist Mike Rutherford were the band's principal composers. The group wrote and rehearsed new songs during mid-1975, and listened to numerous audition tapes for a replacement frontman. They entered Trident Studios in London in October with producer David Hentschel to record the album without a definitive idea of who was going to perform lead vocals. After the search for a singer proved unfruitful, Collins was persuaded to sing "Squonk", and his performance was so strong that he became the band's new frontman.

Upon release, critics were impressed by the improved sound quality and the group's ability to survive the loss of Gabriel without sacrificing the quality of the music. The group toured the album with former Yes and King Crimson drummer Bill Bruford, and the resulting performances in the US raised their profile there. The album has been reissued on CD several times, including a deluxe package with bonus videos in 2007.

== Background ==
Founding member and lead singer Peter Gabriel decided in late 1974, early in the tour for the album The Lamb Lies Down on Broadway, to leave Genesis when the tour was over. His bandmates hoped he would reconsider, for they were still in debt and felt his departure could destroy the band's future, but ultimately accepted that he would leave. The remaining members wanted to continue to collaborate musically, and show journalists and critics they were primarily a songwriting team that could still produce good music. Banks had been close to Gabriel personally, and did not want the band to split up on top of seeing less of one of his best friends. He had written a number of songs for a possible solo project before deciding they should be used on the new Genesis album.

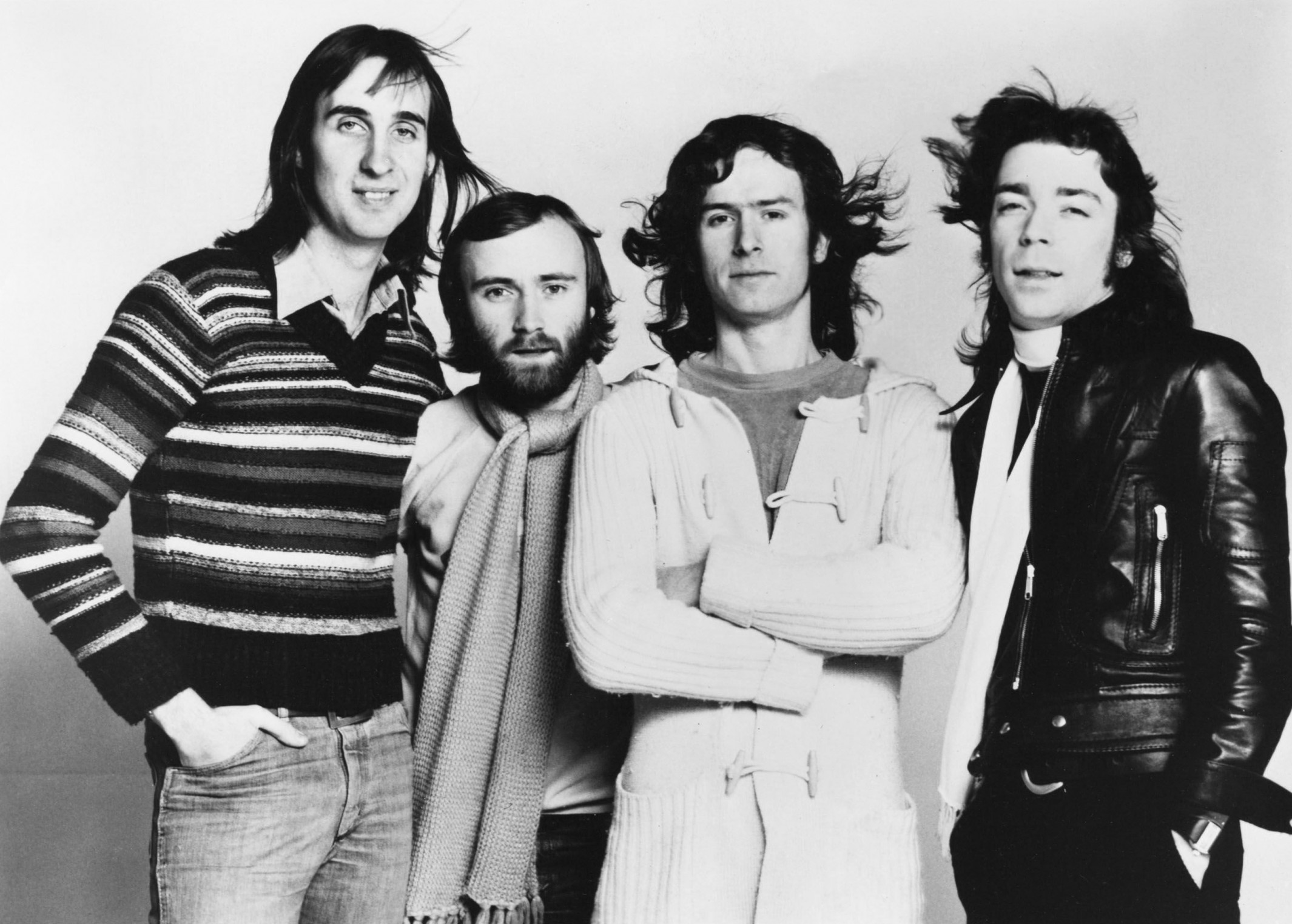
Genesis in a promo for the album. Drummer Phil Collins (middle left) became their lead vocalist following founding member Peter Gabriel's departure the year prior.

Following the end of the tour, guitarist Steve Hackett recorded a solo album, Voyage of the Acolyte, with guitarist/bassist Mike Rutherford and drummer Phil Collins, feeling unsure that Genesis would survive. He reconvened with the remaining group members in July 1975. Banks and Rutherford were particularly keen to write and record new material so that critics and fans would accept Gabriel's departure. The group began rehearsals in a basement studio in Acton, London, and quickly wrote material they were happy with, but had not yet found a replacement lead singer. They placed an anonymous advertisement in the music paper Melody Maker for "a singer for a Genesis-type group", which received around 400 replies. Some applicants sent photographs of themselves in costume and wearing masks, as Gabriel had done on stage. A few weeks into rehearsals, Melody Maker managed to find out about Gabriel leaving the band, and their story made the front page of the 16 August issue, in which journalist Chris Welch declared Genesis dead. The group spoke to the music papers to deny that they were splitting up, and explained they had a new album written and waiting to be recorded.

== Recording and production ==
"I didn't want to not be the drummer ... this is what I did. This is my territory."

— Phil Collins recalling the choice of a new lead singer to replace Peter Gabriel

Recording began in Trident Studios in October 1975 with producer David Hentschel. On previous Genesis albums Hentschel had served as tape op and engineer; Collins had become a fan of his album Startling Music, a re-recording of Ringo Starr's album Ringo on an ARP 2500 synthesizer. Collins thought the group could carry on as an instrumental act, but the others felt that the music would suffer without vocals. The group had still not decided on a replacement singer, so they decided to begin recording backing tracks and to audition singers as they went along. Gabriel visited the band in the studio and listened to the album, and thought they had succeeded in proving to others that they still were "a whole, strong band without me". He knew that the group could write strong material, but the little effort it took them surprised him the most.

Some songs, such as "Ripples...", were written specifically for Collins to sing (and he had previously sung lead on "For Absent Friends" from Nursery Cryme and "More Fool Me" from Selling England by the Pound), but he did not want to take over as a permanent replacement, opting instead to teach potential lead singers the songs. The group still wanted a regular frontman for live performances, as they thought Collins would not be able to handle all the material and it would be problematic trying to sing Gabriel's vocal parts while drumming on tour. One of the auditionees, Mick Strickland, was invited into the studio to sing, but the backing tracks were in a key signature outside of his natural voice range and the band decided not to work with him. With the band's recruitment efforts having failed to produce a suitable vocalist, Collins reluctantly went in the studio to sing "Squonk". His performance was well received by the band, and they decided that he should be their new lead singer. Hentschel stayed on as co-producer for future Genesis albums up to 1980's Duke.

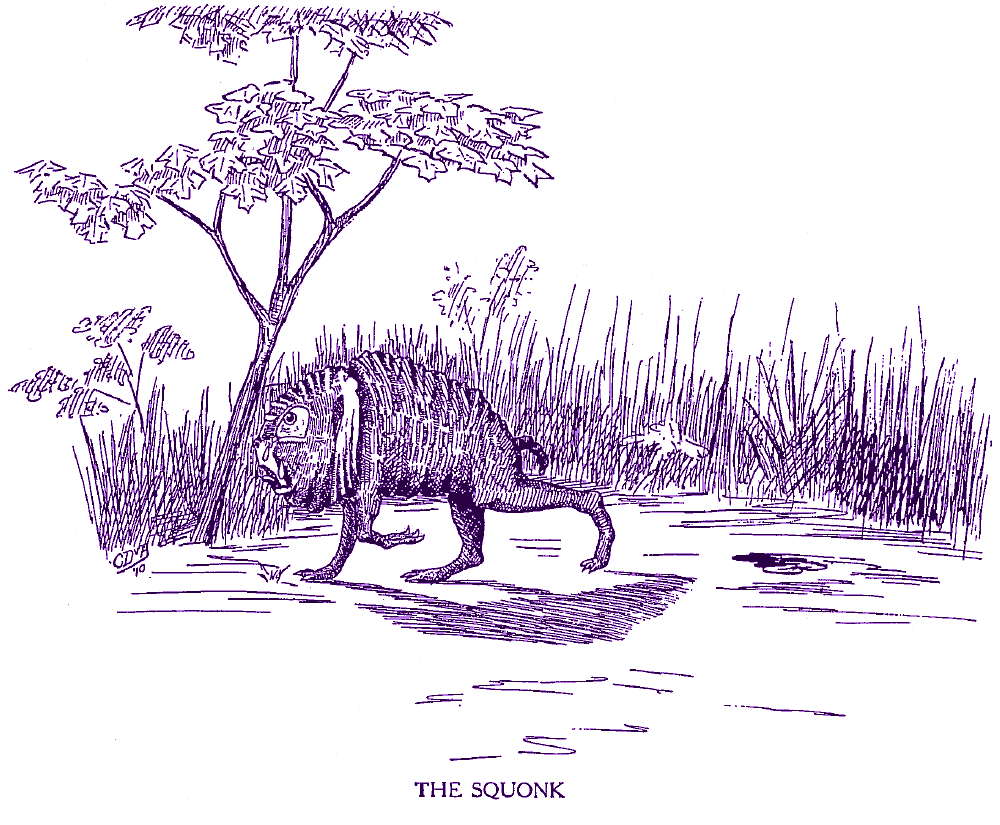
"Squonk" is based on the mythical creature from the US as illustrated here from Fearsome Creatures of the Lumberwoods, With a Few Desert and Mountain Beasts (1910).

== Composition and music ==
The opening track, "Dance on a Volcano", was the first song written for the album. Rutherford felt that, in contrast to the material on The Lamb..., it was easy to write, and was intended to show how Genesis would move forward.

"Entangled" originated from a piece by Hackett that Banks particularly liked, and the latter went on to write the chorus and closing synthesiser solo for the song. Hackett also wrote the lyrics which Collins thought had a Mary Poppins feel to them. Rutherford recalled that Hackett "started writing verses which were very airy-fairy and then he came down with a bang".

"Squonk" is based on the North American myth of the Squonk which, when captured, dissolves into a pool of tears. The song combines a main theme written by Rutherford with a middle section written by Banks, and was designed to resemble Led Zeppelin's "Kashmir".

"Robbery, Assault and Battery" was mostly written by Banks, in an attempt to replicate the humour in some of Gabriel's lyrics. Collins, who also contributed to the writing, sang the song in character, inspired by his role as the Artful Dodger in the original London production of the musical Oliver!.

"Ripples..." was a combination of a twelve-string guitar piece composed by Rutherford and a piano-led middle section written by Banks. The song includes a guitar solo by Hackett featuring an EMS Synthi Hi-Fli guitar synthesiser.

Banks's track "A Trick of the Tail" took form as a song some years before the band recorded it. He was inspired from reading the novel The Inheritors by William Golding and "Getting Better" by the Beatles, and wrote about an alien visiting Earth. When it came to selecting tracks for the album, he wanted to include "something lighter and more quirky."

The closing song, "Los Endos", was written by the whole band. Collins came up with the basic rhythmic structure, inspired by his work in side project Brand X and "Promise of a Fisherman" by Santana, wanting to take the looser playing style into Genesis. Banks and Hackett wrote the main themes, including reprises of sections of "Dance on a Volcano" and "Squonk"; Collins sang a few lines from "Supper's Ready" on the fade-out as a tribute and final goodbye to Gabriel. The opening section of "Los Endos" was recorded for a completely different song, "It's Yourself", which was later released as a B-side. "Los Endos" became a live favourite, and continued to be played through to the band's 2007 Turn It On Again tour. In 2014, Hackett played "Los Endos" on his Genesis Revisited II solo tour.

== Packaging and artwork ==
In an interview in July 2026 Steve Hackett claims that while working on an album cover for A Trick of the Tail, Hipgnosis presented them with the album cover that ended up being that of Led Zeppelin's Presence, and that Genesis rejected it, preferring an illustration over a photograph.

== Critical reception ==
Professional ratings
Review scores
Source	Rating
AllMusic	4.5/5 stars
Q	2/5 stars
Uncut	3/5 stars
The Rolling Stone Album Guide	4/5 stars
The Music Box	3.5/5 stars

A Trick of the Tail had a positive reception from music critics, who were impressed that the group could survive the loss of Gabriel without their music suffering. The sound quality had improved from previous albums as a result of Hentschel's production skills. The album reached No. 3 in the UK and No. 31 in the US It was certified Gold in the UK by the British Phonographic Industry in June and in the US by the RIAA in March 1990. The album remained in the UK charts for 39 weeks and recouped a significant amount of the $400,000 worth of debt they had accumulated by the time Gabriel left.

For the first time in their career, Genesis filmed promotional videos for their songs. The first to be filmed was the title track, which features the band playing to the song together around a piano, including composite shots of a miniature Collins hopping around on a piano and a guitar. The group also produced promotional films of "Ripples..." and "Robbery, Assault and Battery".

It was very satisfying for us to show that we could carry on ... It was great not to have to involve another person too.

— Tony Banks discussing the positive critical reception to the album

== Tour ==
Genesis with touring drummer Bill Bruford (seated middle left behind Collins)

Even after the album had been completed, Collins was unhappy about leaving the drumkit to sing lead, and the band were unsure he would be comfortable as frontman on tour. The group decided to try anyway, and needed someone to drum while Collins was singing. Collins insisted on choosing the touring drummer himself; he selected former Yes and King Crimson drummer Bill Bruford, with whom he had already worked in Brand X. Collins continued to drum during instrumental sections.

The new line-up rehearsed in Dallas for a North American tour, which began in London, Ontario. Collins was nervous about what to say to the audience between songs, so Rutherford and Hackett helped with some announcements. Unlike Gabriel's theatrical approach, Collins developed a humorous rapport with the audience, which was immediately successful. Audiences were happy to hear Collins sing old material such as "Supper's Ready" in concert, and the resulting tour raised Genesis' profile in the US, where they had previously been relatively unknown.

== Track listing ==
A Trick of the Tail was the first Genesis album to credit songwriters individually, as opposed to the band as a whole.

Side one
No.	Title	Writer(s)	Length
1.	"Dance on a Volcano"	Mike Rutherford, Tony Banks, Steve Hackett, Phil Collins	5:56
2.	"Entangled"	Hackett, Banks	6:27
3.	"Squonk"	Rutherford, Banks	6:30
4.	"Mad Man Moon"	Banks	7:34
Total length:			26:27

Side two
No.	Title	Writer(s)	Length
5.	"Robbery, Assault and Battery"	Banks, Collins	6:17
6.	"Ripples..."	Rutherford, Banks	8:07
7.	"A Trick of the Tail"	Banks	4:35
8.	"Los Endos"	Collins, Hackett, Rutherford, Banks	5:48
Total length:			24:47

=== 2007 SACD/CD/DVD release ===
A new version of A Trick of the Tail was released in the UK/Europe/Japan by Virgin/EMI & in the US by Atlantic/Rhino in 2007 as part of the Genesis 1976–1982 box set. This includes the entire album in remixed stereo, surround sound, and related video tracks. A further DVD release includes audio and video tracks, including an interview with the band, the promotional videos, and the film Genesis: In Concert, filmed during the 1976 tour promoting the album.

== Personnel ==
Genesis

- Phil Collins – drums, percussion, lead and backing vocals
- Steve Hackett – electric guitar, twelve-string acoustic guitar
- Mike Rutherford – twelve-string acoustic guitar, bass guitar, bass pedals
- Tony Banks – piano, synthesizers, Hammond organ, Mellotron, twelve-string acoustic guitar, backing vocals

Production

- Genesis – production
- David Hentschel – production, engineering
- Nick "Haddock" Bradford – engineering
- Tex and Jeff – equipment
- Neal, John and Terry – liquid sustenance
- Hipgnosis – sleeve design
- Colin Elgie – sleeve design
- Special thanks to Tony Smith, Alex Sim and Regis
- Recorded at Trident Studios, London

== Charts ==
=== Weekly charts ===
Chart (1976)	Peak position
Australian Albums (Kent Music Report)	93
Canada Top Albums/CDs (RPM)	12
Dutch Albums (Album Top 100)	7
Finnish Albums (The Official Finnish Charts)	17
French Albums (SNEP)	1
German Albums (Offizielle Top 100)	43
Italian Albums (Musica e dischi)	4
New Zealand Albums (RMNZ)	4
Swedish Albums (Sverigetopplistan)	17
UK Albums (Official Charts)	3
US Billboard 200	31

Chart (2014–24)	Peak position
Hungarian Physical Albums (MAHASZ)	21
UK Rock & Metal Albums (Official Charts)	13

=== Year-end charts ===
Chart (1976)	Position
Dutch Albums (Album Top 100)	47
New Zealand Albums (RMNZ)	27
UK Albums (OCC)	32

== Certifications ==
Region	Certification	Certified units/sales
Canada (Music Canada)	Platinum	100,000^{^}
France (SNEP)	Gold	100,000^{*}
United Kingdom (BPI)	Gold	100,000^{^}
United States (RIAA)	Gold	500,000^{^}
^{*} Sales figures based on certification alone.^{^} Shipments figures based on certification alone.

== Sources ==
- Bowler, Dave; Dray, Bryan (1992). Genesis: A Biography. Sidgwick & Jackson. ISBN 978-0-283-06132-5.
- Rutherford, Mike (2014). The Living Years. Hachette UK. ISBN 978-1-472-11035-0.
- Giammetti, Mario (2021). Genesis 1975 to 2021 – The Phil Collins Years. Kingmaker UK. ISBN 978-1-8384918-0-2.
