= Turn It On Again =

1980 single by Genesis

Single by Genesis

from the album Duke
- B-side: "Behind the Lines" (Edit) (UK); "Evidence of Autumn" (US)
- Released: 3 March 1980 (UK); August 1980 (US)
- Recorded: October – December 1979
- Genre: Arena rock; pop rock
- Length: 3:50 (album version); 3:44 (UK single remix); 3:27 (US single remix edit)
- Label: Charisma Records; Atlantic (U.S., Canada)
- Songwriters: Tony Banks, Phil Collins, Mike Rutherford
- Producers: Genesis, David Hentschel

Genesis singles chronology
"Deep in the Motherlode" (1978)	"Turn It On Again" (1980)	"Duchess" (1980)

Official video
- "Turn It On Again" on YouTube

"Turn It On Again" is a song by the English rock band Genesis, which features on their 1980 album Duke. When released as a single, the song reached number 8 on the UK singles chart, becoming the band's second top-10 hit. The lyric, by Mike Rutherford, concerns a man who does nothing more than watch television and listen to radio. He becomes obsessed with the people he watches on it, believing them to be his friends, in an example of parasocial interaction.

== Background ==
"Turn It On Again" was built from leftovers from projects by each member: The musical bit used as the chorus was conceived by Tony Banks for A Curious Feeling: "We kind of put [Rutherford's riff] – the bit he didn't use on Smallcreep's Day, curiously enough – with the bit I didn't use on A Curious Feeling, and put these two together. We made it much more rocky; both bits became much more rocky. My bit was a bit more epic, and Mike's bit was a bit slower and a bit more heavy metal. And then Phil gave it a much more straightforward drum part; perhaps neither of us would have thought that we would want that on that bit [...] We put on one or two other bits, too, that ended up from there".

The song's verse/chorus sections alternate time signatures, 6/4 to 7/4 (13/4), while the intro and bridge sections are in 4/4 and 5/4 (9/4). The riff written by Rutherford on which the song was largely based was originally much slower, but it was transformed with help from Phil Collins. Rutherford explains on the Songbook DVD: "I had this riff [plays lead riff on guitar], but at the time I was playing it like this: [plays slower]. And Phil said, 'Why don't you try it in a faster speed?' and then he said to me, 'Do you realize it is in 13/8?' and I said, 'What do you mean, it's in 13? It's in 4/4, isn't it?' 'No, it's 13.'"

Collins confirms: "You can't dance to it. You see people trying to dance to it every now and again. They get on the off beat but they don't know why". Tony Banks adds: "You can't dance or clap along to it because of that time signature. When we play it live, you can always see the audience getting caught out." Peter Gabriel played drums when he reunited with his former bandmates at 1982's Six of the Best show. Banks said that Gabriel found himself baffled by its time signatures. Banks said the song "does funny things – it's truly a Genesis song."

Banks also recalls the use of a duck call on the track to trigger brass hits from a Yamaha CS-80 synthesizer: "…oh Phil had a duck… A trumpet or it may just have been a duck call that he used to trigger the sample to trigger the CS80 to get the sound".

"Turn It On Again" was originally a section of a long suite that was split up into individual songs. At the time, it was just an interlude between sections of the informally titled "The Duke Suite".

"Turn It On Again" has been a favourite at Genesis's shows. Consequently, the group's 1999 compilation Turn It On Again: The Hits and its 2007 expanded reissue, subtitled The Tour Edition, were named after it, as was the band's 2007 Turn It On Again: The Tour reunion tour. In the 1980s, the band would attach a medley of 1960s pop songs (referred to by the band as the "Blues Brothers" medley, as the first song was "Everybody Needs Somebody to Love"). The song was returned to its album form for the We Can't Dance tour and the band later regarded the medley as a poor decision.

Originally written and recorded in the key of B Major, it was transposed down to A for the 2007 tour and further down to G for the 2021 tour to compensate for Collins' changing vocal range.

== Chart performance ==
"Turn It On Again" was a moderate hit in North America, but failed to reach the Top 40 except in regional markets such as Chicago (No. 31 on WLS-AM). However, it was a bigger hit in Europe, particularly in the UK, where it reached No. 8.

Chart (1980)	Peak position
Canadian RPM Top Singles	49
France	32
Ireland (IRMA)	12
Italy	8
Netherlands	38
UK Singles Chart	8
US Billboard Hot 100	58
US Cash Box Top 100	55

== Personnel ==
- Phil Collins – drums, percussion, lead and backing vocals, duck call
- Tony Banks – keyboards, backing vocals
- Mike Rutherford – guitars, bass pedals
