= A Trick of the Tail (song) =

1976 song by Genesis

Single by Genesis

from the album A Trick of the Tail
- B-side: "Ripples"
- Released: 12 March 1976
- Recorded: 1975; Trident Studios, London
- Genre: Progressive rock; art rock
- Length: 4:35
- Label: Charisma/Phonogram (UK); Atco (US)
- Songwriter: Tony Banks
- Producers: David Hentschel; Genesis

Genesis singles chronology
"The Carpet Crawlers" (1975)	"A Trick of the Tail" (1976)	"Entangled" (1976)

"A Trick of the Tail" is a song by the progressive rock band Genesis, taken from the 1976 album of the same title. It was written by the band's keyboard player Tony Banks.

== History ==
The song was released as a single, with "Ripples" as the B-side, but failed to make any significant chart impact. The majority of the song was written in 1972 and was originally intended for the Foxtrot album. The song's rhythm, according to Banks, is partly influenced by The Beatles' "Getting Better".

The lyrics are inspired by the 1955 novel The Inheritors by British author William Golding. Like much of the album A Trick of the Tail, the song's lyrics focus on a specific character: the "Beast" who leaves his own kingdom and enters the world of humans. He is captured and put on display in a freak show after his captors refuse to believe in his kingdom. The Beast laments his decision to leave his home, describing it as a paradise covered in gold. His captors then release him in exchange for leading them to his world. However, just as they see what appears to be a "spire of gold", they find that the Beast has vanished, though they do hear his voice.

== Music video ==
"A Trick of the Tail" was the third Genesis song to be accompanied by a promotional video, and the first single featuring Phil Collins as the band's lead vocalist. The video, directed by Bruce Gowers, features the band gathered around an upright piano, with the front panels removed, performing the song.

Special effects (including chroma key) make Collins, in miniature size, appear to walk and dance inside the piano, as well as on Steve Hackett's guitar. The video concludes with all four of the band miniaturized on the piano keyboard. In a 1994 interview with VH1 for the "Phil Collins One on One" episode, Collins called the video the most embarrassing and cringe-worthy of his entire career.

== Personnel ==
- Mike Rutherford – bass guitar, bass pedals
- Tony Banks – piano
- Phil Collins – drums, lead and backing vocals
- Steve Hackett – electric guitar
