= Duchess (Genesis song) =

Single by Genesis

from the album Duke
- B-side: "Open Door"
- Released: 9 May 1980
- Recorded: October–December 1979
- Studio: Polar Studios
- Length: 6:40 (album version); 4:21 (single version); 3:57 (music video)
- Label: Charisma/Virgin (UK); Atlantic (US)
- Songwriters: Tony Banks, Phil Collins, Mike Rutherford
- Producers: David Hentschel and Genesis

Genesis singles chronology
"Turn It On Again" (1980)	"Duchess" (1980)	"Misunderstanding" (1980)

Audio sample
- "Duchess": file; help

"Duchess" is a song by the English rock band Genesis, appearing as the second track on their 1980 album, Duke. It peaked at number 46 in the UK singles chart. The song is a part of the album's "hidden suite", which included "Behind the Lines", "Duchess", "Guide Vocal", "Turn It On Again", "Duke's Travels", and "Duke's End". It was the first Genesis song to use a rhythm machine and a drum box.

The lyrics tell the story of the rise and fall of an ambitious singer. At the start of her career, she dreams of singing to large crowds, but cares more about her music than the prospect of fame. As her success increases, her dream comes true and she becomes a superstar, adored by ecstatic audiences. After several years at the top, she struggles to stay relevant. By caring too much about what her audience wants, the quality of her music is negatively impacted. Unable to stay in the spotlight, she chooses to end her music career and fondly remembers her former superstardom.

The video for the song shows Phil Collins, Tony Banks and Mike Rutherford playing at various points around the Liverpool Empire Theatre. The drum machine used in the song, a Roland CR-78, is shown at the beginning of the video.

In a 2023 interview, Banks said, "The song that both Phil and I always rate as perhaps our favorite Genesis song is 'Duchess' from Duke. I like it because it has a simple lyric — the rise and fall of a female rock star. [...] I think it has an incredible atmosphere. I always thought it could have been a hit. We did release it as a single at one point, but it didn't get far ... So I'd rate that as very underrated."

== Personnel ==
- Tony Banks – keyboards, backing vocals
- Phil Collins – vocals, drums, Roland CR-78
- Mike Rutherford – guitars, bass pedals, backing vocals
