= Duke (album) =

Studio album by Genesis
- Released: 24 March 1980
- Recorded: November–December 1979; January 1980 (mixing)
- Studios: Polar, Stockholm, Sweden
- Genres: Progressive rock; art rock; pop
- Length: 55:06
- Labels: Charisma; Atlantic
- Producers: David Hentschel; Genesis

Genesis chronology
...And Then There Were Three... (1978)	Duke (1980)	Abacab (1981)

Singles from Duke
- 1. "Turn It On Again" Released: 3 March 1980; 2. "Duchess" Released: 9 May 1980 (UK); 3. "Misunderstanding" Released: May 1980 (US)

Duke is the tenth studio album by the English rock band Genesis, released in the USA on 24 March 1980 and in the UK on 28 March by Charisma Records.

The album followed a period of inactivity for the band in early 1979. Phil Collins moved to Vancouver, Canada, in an effort to salvage his failing first marriage, while Tony Banks and Mike Rutherford recorded solo albums. Collins returned to the UK after his marriage ended and wrote a significant amount of material, some of which was used for Duke and some was later reworked for his first solo album, Face Value. Duke contained a mix of individually written songs and tracks that evolved from jam sessions in mid-1979, while recording took place at the end of the year. The break in activity rejuvenated the band, and they found the album an easy one to work on.

Duke was positively received by music critics, who praised the album for bridging the band's progressive rock-oriented past, such as the closing ten-minute "Duke's Travels"/"Duke's End" suite, with their more pop rock-oriented, commercially accessible direction, as displayed on the hit singles "Turn It On Again", "Duchess", and "Misunderstanding". It reached No. 11 in the US, and became their first album to reach No. 1 in the UK. It has since been certified Platinum in both countries.

== Background ==
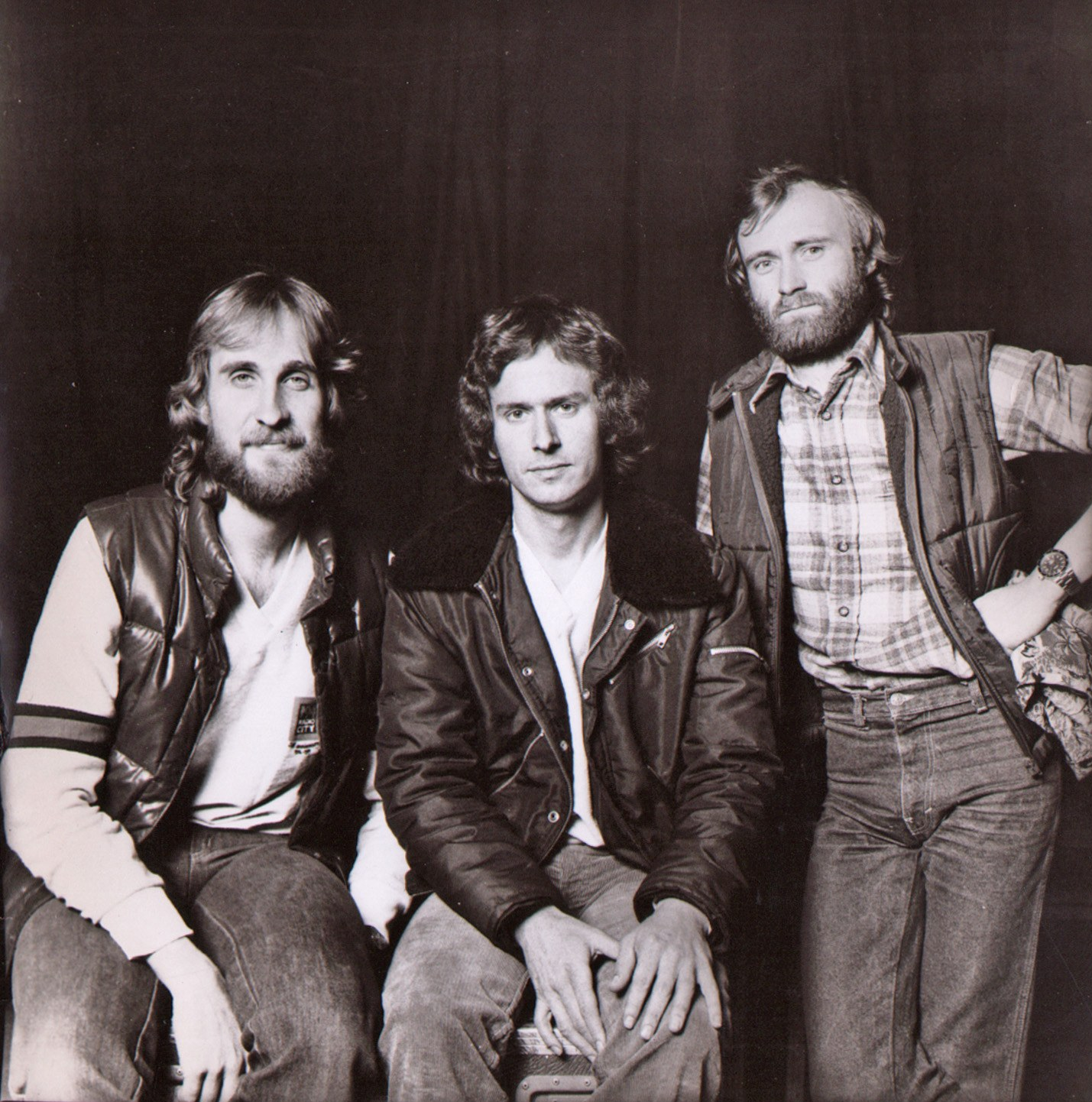
Genesis in a promotional photo for the album. From left: Mike Rutherford, Tony Banks, Phil Collins

By 1978, Genesis were a trio of lead singer and drummer Phil Collins, keyboardist Tony Banks and guitarist/bassist Mike Rutherford. They had survived the departure of original frontman Peter Gabriel and guitarist Steve Hackett and released the album ...And Then There Were Three..., which included the top ten single "Follow You Follow Me". The group were still touring successfully, and enjoyed the songwriting collaborations among the three of them. They decided to take a break before writing and recording a new album, which would be largely group-written in a rehearsal room, without many pre-conceived ideas.

The group's touring schedule had put particular pressure on Collins, whose marriage was at risk of collapse due to him being away from home frequently. His wife, Andrea, had warned him that if he committed himself to the full ...And Then There Were Three... Tour, she would not be there when he returned. Collins, however, was convinced that Genesis were on the verge of an international breakthrough and that his work with the band would pay dividends in the future. By the end of 1978, Andrea had decided to move to Vancouver with their children. Realising that his marriage was more important than the band, Collins held a meeting with Banks, Rutherford and manager Tony Smith. He said he was moving to Vancouver to try to rebuild his family, and that the group would have to accommodate this. In an interview for Sounds, Collins said, "I went off for two months to try to sort things out ... I was never going to leave the band. It was just that if I was going to be living in Vancouver then we'd have had to organise ourselves differently." He also noted that the individual members of his side project Brand X were geographically dispersed.

Banks and Rutherford suggested the band take an extended hiatus, hoping Collins would save his marriage and that the band could work with him in Vancouver. Banks recorded his solo album A Curious Feeling at Polar Studios in Stockholm with Genesis touring drummer Chester Thompson and singer Kim Beacon, while Rutherford also recorded his first solo album, Smallcreep's Day, at the same studio. In April 1979, Collins returned to the UK after the attempt to salvage his marriage failed. With time to spare before working on the next Genesis album, he gigged with Brand X, and began work on demo tracks for what became his first solo album Face Value at his home in Shalford, Surrey. As well as playing piano and synthesizers, he had recently picked up a Roland CR-78 drum machine and become interested in the possibilities of electronic drums. (Note: Collins later said he had approached Pete Townshend, asking if he could replace Keith Moon, who had died a few months earlier, in the Who, but the group had already recruited Kenney Jones.)

== Writing and recording ==
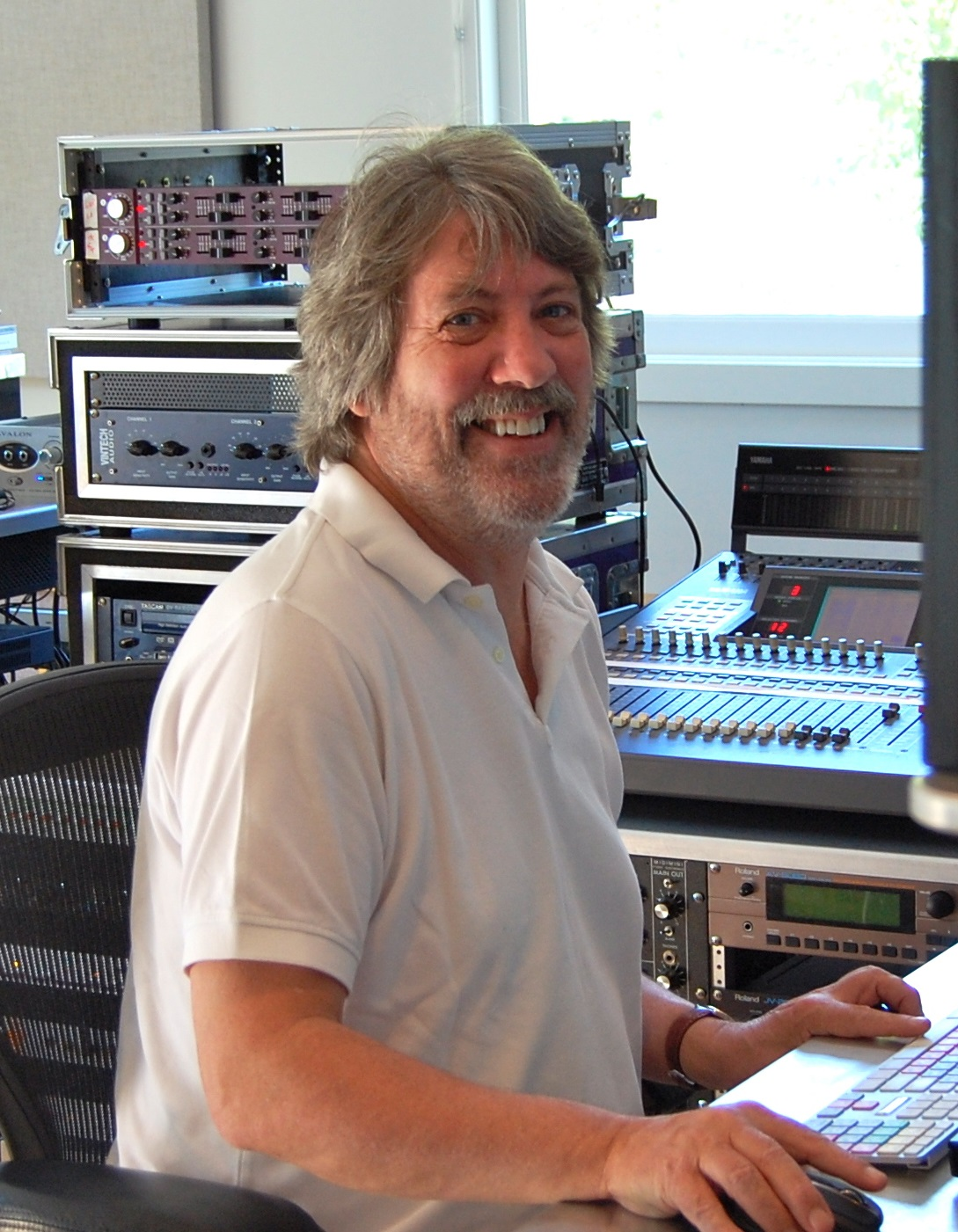
Duke was the last Genesis album to be co-produced by David Hentschel.

In autumn 1979, Banks and Rutherford moved in with Collins in Shalford to begin rehearsals on Duke. Collins had written a large number of songs, but he felt many of them would not suit Genesis – while Banks and Rutherford were short of material, having just recorded their solo albums. The three decided each member should contribute two of their own songs for the band to work on. Banks put forward "Heathaze" and "Cul-de-Sac", Rutherford used "Man of Our Times" and "Alone Tonight", and Collins had "Misunderstanding" and "Please Don't Ask". The remainder of the songs were written together in rehearsals. Banks later regretted not choosing Collins's "In the Air Tonight" for the album. His track "Cul-de-Sac" became a problem for Collins to get into as its overall style and lyrical content no longer interested him, and Collins said Banks realised that he should have kept the song for his solo output. "Please Don't Ask" is a song Collins wrote during his divorce from his first wife. Biographer Ray Coleman said the song is "a searing mixture of a love letter and a lament for the loss of his children". Collins recalled that Banks and Rutherford chose to include the song "Misunderstanding" owing to its Beach Boys feel.

The group found the writing process easier and more enjoyable than ...And Then There Were Three..., which was primarily songs written in advance individually by the members. Rutherford summarised his time writing songs for Duke as "getting back to the basic stage of ideas being worked on jointly". Banks reasoned that much of the band's refreshed attitude was down to not having worked together in a while, which resulted in good ideas being put forward – something which he said had not happened for some time. Collins felt the band interacted "as a group much better ... there's definitely a side to us coming out which wasn't on the last album; the playing side". Rutherford would later describe the writing process for the album, alongside the one for Abacab, as a "rethink" of Genesis' approach, refocusing their output to group writing and improvisation. In contrast to earlier Genesis albums, most tracks are short – with the exception of the ten-minute "Duke's Travels"/"Duke's End" suite that closes the album. The group went to Polar Studios to record the album, starting on 12 November 1979, and continued recording up to the end of the year. As with several earlier albums, production duties were shared by the band and regular co-producer David Hentschel. Collins used the Roland CR-78 drum machine for "Duchess" – the first time he used one on a Genesis song.

The cover art was drawn by French illustrator Lionel Koechlin and taken from his book L'Alphabet d'Albert, published in 1979. The band liked his work and decided to use it as the cover; but Collins maintained that the character depicted is neither the album's titular character nor related to any song on it.

=== The "Duke Suite" ===
"Behind the Lines" was the first song arranged for the album and "Duchess" came about from rhythms that Collins had played on his set of drum pads. In its original form, "Behind the Lines", "Duchess", "Guide Vocal", "Turn It On Again", "Duke's Travels", and "Duke's End" were one 30-minute track that told a story of a fictional character named Albert which had a working title of "Duke". The group chose this name because the fanfare melodies on "Behind the Lines" and "Duke's End" conjured an image of royalty. The band decided against sequencing the tracks this way on the album, partly to avoid comparisons to their 23-minute track "Supper's Ready" from Foxtrot, but also to have certain segments of the suite, such as "Duchess" and "Turn It On Again", released as singles. The six tracks were performed live on the album's supporting tour with Collins introducing it as "The Story of Albert".

"Turn It On Again" was originally a short connecting piece in the middle of this medley, but the band enjoyed playing it so much, they decided to double its length and make it more of a standout track. It came from a piece that Rutherford discarded from Smallcreep's Day and a separate piece from Banks that they joined together. The group considered placing the band-written songs on side one and the individually written tracks on the other, but this was rejected. Rutherford described the final running order as "a very balanced album".

== Release ==
Duke was released in the US on 24 March 1980 and in the UK on 28 March. It was the band's greatest commercial success at the time of its release; it spent two weeks at No. 1 on the UK Albums Chart and peaked at No. 11 on the US Billboard 200. The album spawned three singles; "Turn It On Again" reached No. 8 in the UK and No. 58 in the US; "Duchess" reached No. 46 in the UK; "Misunderstanding" reached No. 42 in the UK and No. 14 in the US. Duke was certified Platinum by the British Phonographic Industry on 3 July 1980 and by the Recording Industry Association of America on 11 March 1988.

=== Critical reception ===
Professional ratings
Review scores
Source	Rating
AllMusic	4/5 stars
Encyclopedia of Popular Music	4/5 stars
The Great Rock Discography	6/10
Pitchfork	8.0/10
Q	3/5 stars
Record Mirror	5/5 stars
The Rolling Stone Album Guide	4/5 stars
Smash Hits	6/10
Sounds	4/5 stars

Duke received a mostly positive reception from music critics. In his review for Rolling Stone, David Fricke said that "Turn It On Again" is "vibrant rock & roll" and thought that "Man of Our Times", "Duchess", "Duke's Travels", and "Duke's End" "possess a refreshing urgency". Fricke points out the band's losses without Gabriel and Hackett in the line-up, yet summarised Duke as "comforting: a reassurance that Genesis aren't for an exodus yet." Sounds' Hugh Fielder gave the album four stars out of five, enjoying the opening of "Behind the Lines" and considering Collins's vocals to be "more convincing than ... before". He felt the first side was better than the second, and criticised some lyrics, but concluded "no Genesis fan could be disappointed". The Los Angeles Times's Steve Pond described the album's music as "identifiably Genesis, but it is toned-down" and "a more confident and successful album than ...And Then There Were Three...". He criticised the album as inconsistent with a lack of "melodic invention" on side one, but thought "Duke's Travels" and "Duke's End" were "one of the best and most consistent pieces of music that band has made in some time".

In a retrospective review, AllMusic's Stephen Thomas Erlewine felt Duke was the Genesis album that "leaped into the fray" of pop music but retained "a heavy dose" of progressive rock with the "Duke" suite. Erlewine thought the album comes off "a little bombastic" at times, with "Misunderstanding" and "Turn It On Again" being the two tracks that "showcase the new version of Genesis at its absolute best".

=== Tour ===
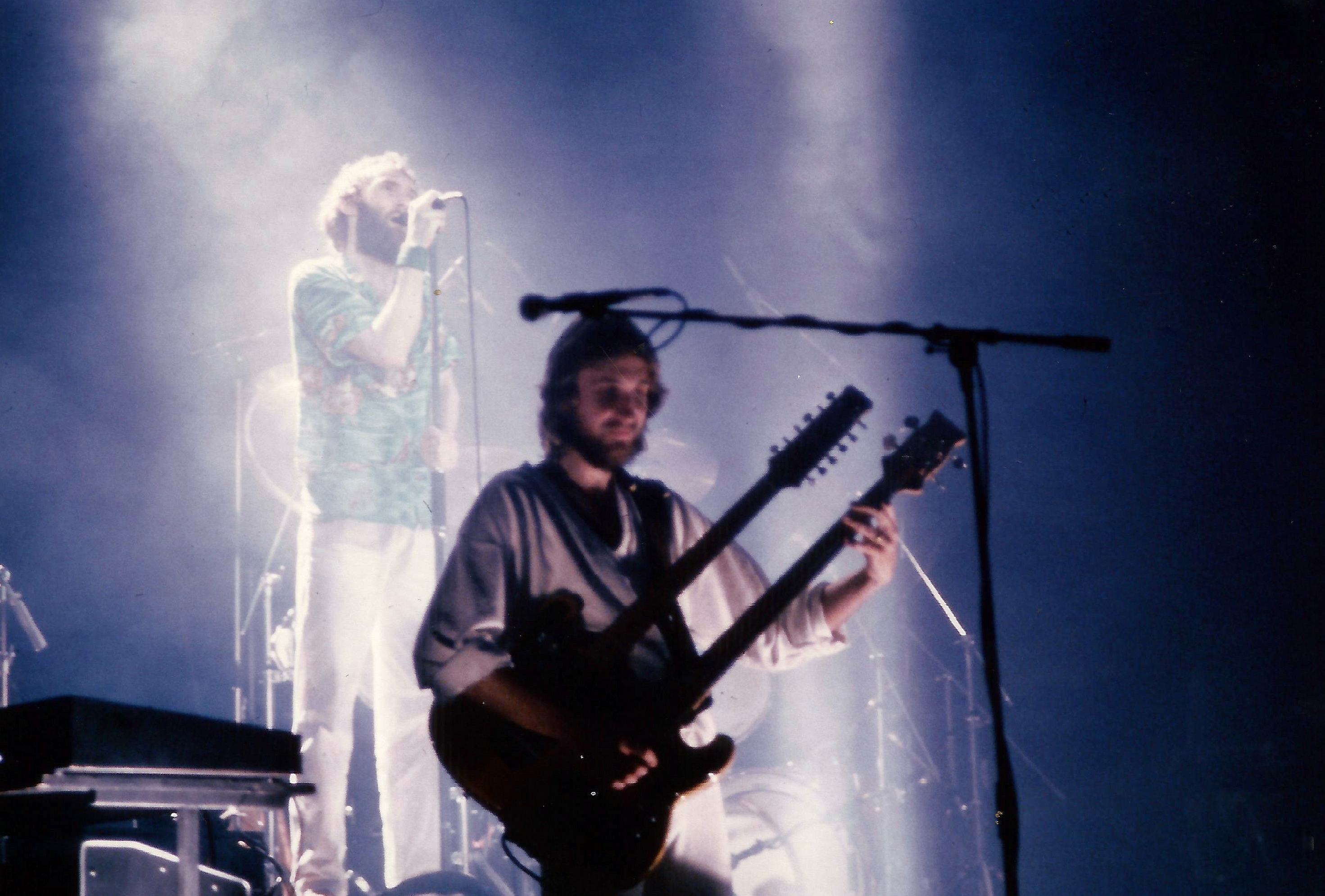
Collins and Rutherford on the Duke tour, 1980

Genesis supported the album with a 78-date tour across Europe and North America, between 17 March to 30 June 1980. They were joined by drummer Chester Thompson and guitarist Daryl Stuermer. As the group had not embarked on a full scale UK tour since 1977, the tour began with a 40-date trek across the country, which saw all 108,000 available tickets sold within hours of going on sale. A 40-minute excerpt from the performance at the Lyceum Ballroom in London was broadcast on The Old Grey Whistle Test and released as a bonus feature on the 2007 reissue of Duke. Recordings from the tour were released on Three Sides Live (1982), Genesis Archive 2: 1976–1992 (2000), and BBC Broadcasts (2023).

=== Reissues ===
A digitally remastered version of Duke was released on CD in 1994 on Virgin in Europe and Atlantic in the US and Canada. The CD included the album's original booklet, artwork and lyrics. It was reissued again in 2007 as part of the Genesis 1976–1982 box set, which included a new stereo and 5.1 surround sound mix and a DVD of bonus features including band interviews, music videos, live performances and tour programs.

== Track listing ==
All songs written by Tony Banks, Phil Collins and Mike Rutherford except where noted.

Side one
No.	Title	Writer(s)	Length
1.	"Behind the Lines"		5:31
2.	"Duchess"		6:40
3.	"Guide Vocal"	Banks	1:18
4.	"Man of Our Times"	Rutherford	5:35
5.	"Misunderstanding"	Collins	3:11
6.	"Heathaze"	Banks	5:00
Total length:			27:15

Side two
No.	Title	Writer(s)	Length
1.	"Turn It On Again"		3:50
2.	"Alone Tonight"	Rutherford	3:54
3.	"Cul-de-sac"	Banks	5:02
4.	"Please Don't Ask"	Collins	4:00
5.	"Duke's Travels"		8:41
6.	"Duke's End" (instrumental)		2:04
Total length:			27:31

=== Additional tracks ===
Additional songs recorded during the Duke sessions:

Title	Source
"Evidence of Autumn"	"Misunderstanding" (UK) "Turn it on Again" (US); Three Sides Live (non-UK editions)
"Open Door"	"Duchess"; Three Sides Live (non-UK editions)

== Personnel ==
Genesis

- Tony Banks – keyboards, backing vocals, 12-string guitar, duck (Note: According to later interviews, the "duck" was a duck call used to trigger a sound on a Yamaha CS-80 synthesizer.)
- Mike Rutherford – guitars, bass guitar, bass pedals; ARP Avatar & Roland GR-500 guitar synthesizers, backing vocals
- Phil Collins – lead vocals, drums, drum machine, percussion, duck

Production

- David Hentschel – production, audio engineering, backing vocals
- Genesis – production
- Dave Bascombe – assistant engineering
- Ray Staff – mastering
- Lionel Koechlin – cover
- Bill Smith – art direction
- Recorded at Polar Studios, Sweden
- Mixed at Maison Rouge, London
- Mastered at Trident Studios, London

== Charts ==
=== Weekly charts ===
Weekly chart performance for Duke
Chart (1980)	Peak position
Australian Albums (Kent Music Report)	22
Austrian Albums (Ö3 Austria)	14
Canada Top Albums/CDs (RPM)	1
Finnish Albums (The Official Finnish Charts)	14
French Albums (SNEP)	4
Dutch Albums (Album Top 100)	12
German Albums (Offizielle Top 100)	2
Italian Albums (Musica e dischi)	6
New Zealand Albums (RMNZ)	13
Norwegian Albums (VG-lista)	4
Spanish Albums (AFYVE)	8
Swedish Albums (Sverigetopplistan)	9
UK Albums (Official Charts)	1
US Billboard 200	11

=== Year-end charts ===
Year-end chart performance for Duke
Chart (1980)	Position
Canada Top Albums/CDs (RPM)	5
German Albums (Offizielle Top 100)	33
Italian Albums (Musica e dischi)	15
US Billboard 200	44

== Certifications ==
Certifications for Duke
Region	Certification	Certified units/sales
France (SNEP)	Gold	100,000^{*}
United Kingdom (BPI)	Platinum	300,000^{^}
United States (RIAA)	Platinum	1,000,000^{^}
^{*} Sales figures based on certification alone.^{^} Shipments figures based on certification alone.
