= Follow You Follow Me =

1978 single by Genesis

Single by Genesis

from the album ...And Then There Were Three...
- B-side: "Ballad of Big" (UK); "Inside and Out" (US)
- Released: 24 February 1978
- Recorded: September–October 1977
- Genre: Soft rock; pop rock
- Length: 3:59 (album version); 3:19 (US remix)
- Label: Charisma (UK); Atlantic (US)
- Songwriters: Tony Banks; Phil Collins; Mike Rutherford
- Producers: David Hentschel; Genesis

Genesis singles chronology
"Your Own Special Way" (1977)	"Follow You Follow Me" (1978)	"Many Too Many" (1978)

Official video
- "Follow You Follow Me" on YouTube

"Follow You Follow Me" is a love song written and recorded by the English rock band Genesis. It was released in February 1978 as the first single from their ninth studio album, ...And Then There Were Three... (1978). The music was composed by the band, and the lyrics were written by bassist and guitarist Mike Rutherford. The single became Genesis' first top 10 hit in the UK and first top 40 hit in the US, reaching No. 7 and No. 23 respectively.

== Background ==
Like much of the rest of the album, the slower, sentimental "Follow You Follow Me" was a departure from most of their previous work as a progressive rock band, featuring a simple melody, romantic lyrics and a verse-chorus structure. Although previous albums contained love ballads, such as Selling England by the Pound's "More Fool Me" and "Your Own Special Way" from Wind & Wuthering (1976), "Follow You Follow Me" was the first worldwide pop success by the group. The band felt that their music was attracting mainly male audiences, so this song was written specifically to redress the imbalance.

== Composition ==
The song started from a guitar riff by Rutherford, who also said he wrote the lyrics in about ten minutes. At the time, the band usually wrote songs individually. Keyboardist Tony Banks was quoted:

It was our only truly group-written number. Mike played the riff, then I started playing a chord sequence and melody line on it, which Phil then centralized around. It worked so well as a very simple thing; it was enough as it stood. I'd just written a simple love lyric for "Many Too Many", and I think Mike was keen to try the same thing. Maybe "Follow You Follow Me" was almost too banal, but I got used to it. I think we find it much easier to write long stories than simple love songs.

Drummer and vocalist Phil Collins described it as "a great rhythm track" but said it "was not intended to be a hit single".

== Reception ==
Record World called it an "engaging song" that has a "light, flowing sound."

== Chart performance ==
At the time of release, "Follow You Follow Me" became the band's most successful single, spending 4 weeks in the top 10 on the UK Singles chart, peaking at #7 for two weeks. The song also peaked at #23 on the U.S. Billboard Hot 100, #23 on the U.S. Cashbox Top 100 chart and #21 on the Adult Contemporary chart, #16 on the Australian singles charts, and #22 on the NZ singles charts. The song is included in the 2005 book, Rock Song Index: The 7500 Most Important Songs for the Rock and Roll Era, which states "the formerly progressive Genesis begins to proceed without impediment toward the Top 10".

== Music video ==
The music video for the song was a mimed live performance of the band filmed at Shepperton Studios. It later appeared on their DVD The Video Show (2004). In the video, the main scene has Collins using a shaker-type instrument while singing, but he was also separately filmed playing the drums.

== Live performances ==
"Follow You Follow Me" was played live during the …And Then There Were Three…, Duke, Three Sides Live Encore tour, Genesis, Invisible Touch (1986 set only), Calling All Stations (with Ray Wilson on vocals), and Turn It On Again tours. An excerpt of the song was also played on the We Can't Dance Tour, as part of an "Old Medley" of Genesis songs. The band would include the song as the last song in their acoustic set for The Last Domino? Tour, following "That's All" and "The Lamb Lies Down on Broadway".

During the Turn It On Again Tour, Collins performed on the drums as well as the vocals (making it one of very few songs in which he performs both simultaneously), while animated line art of a selection of the band's album art played in the background video screens. The first and last scenes in the animated sequence show the "father" character from the We Can't Dance album cover, raising his hand. A bright white spotlight (on Collins) lights up at the beginning of the song, and turns itself off at the end.

The song was also performed live on Collins' solo Not Dead Yet Tour, as well as by Mike + the Mechanics (with Tim Howar on vocals) during their Out of the Blue tour and on Ray Wilson's solo tours.

== Personnel ==
- Phil Collins – vocals, drums, percussion
- Tony Banks – keyboards
- Mike Rutherford – guitar, bass guitar

== Certifications ==
Certifications for "Follow You Follow Me"
Region	Certification	Certified units/sales
United Kingdom (BPI)	Silver	250,000^{^}
^{^} Shipments figures based on certification alone.
