= David Hentschel =

British recording engineer (born 1952)

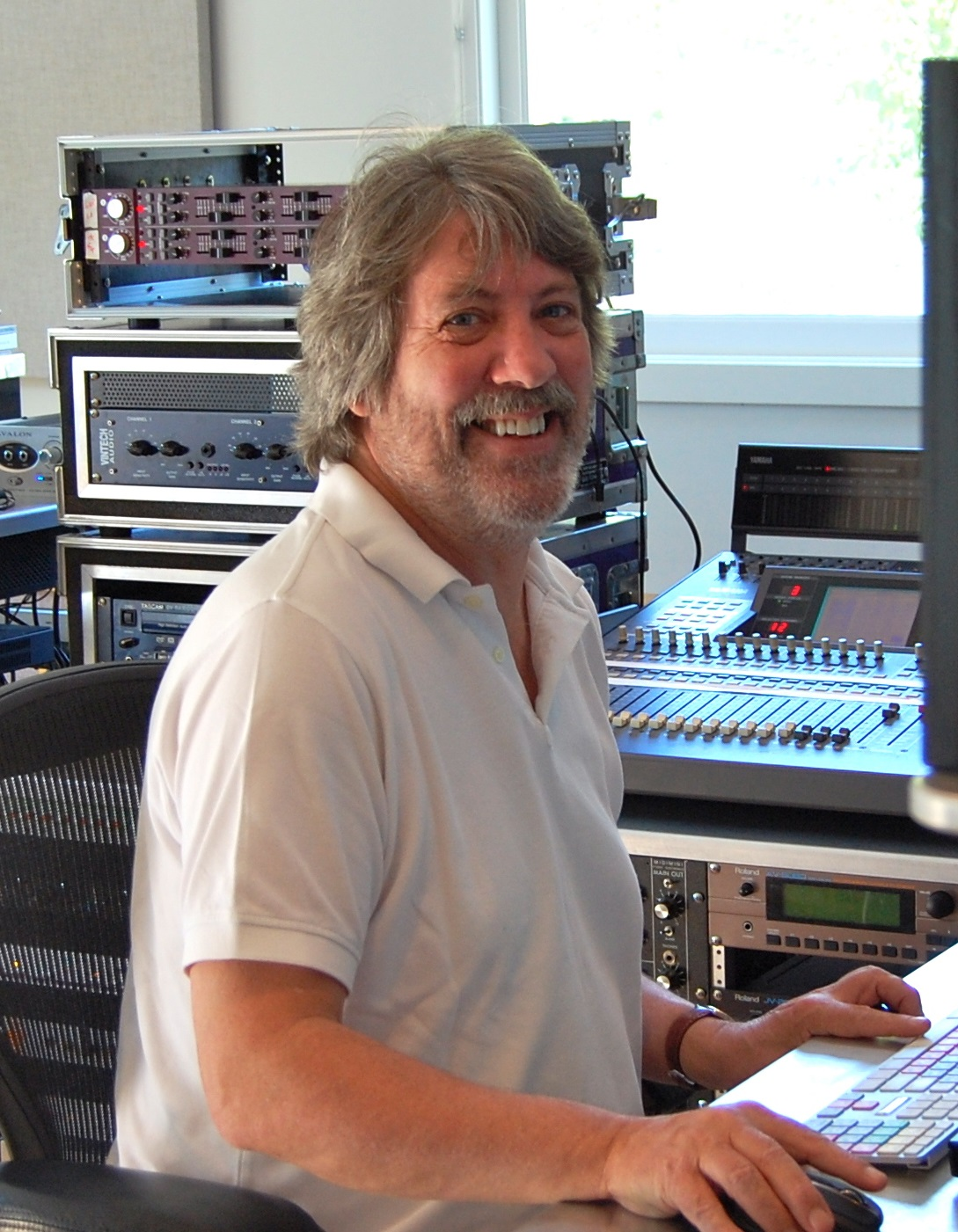
- David Hentschel at Scott Frankfurt Studio, Woodland Hills, California

Background information
- Born: 18 December 1952 (age 73); Sussex, England
- Occupations: Recording engineer, film composer, music producer
- Instrument: Keyboards

David Hentschel (born 18 December 1952) is a retired English recording engineer, film score composer and music producer who engineered on George Harrison's All Things Must Pass and Elton John's Goodbye Yellow Brick Road, as well as working with such artists as Genesis, Tony Banks, Ringo Starr, Queen, Nazareth, Marti Webb, Andy Summers, Mike Oldfield, Renaissance, Peter Hammill and Ronnie Caryl.

== Biography ==
Hentschel was born in Sussex. His career began at Trident Studios in London where he was initially an assistant before rising to become one of the in-house producers. In addition to engineering and production credits, Hentschel also played early synthesizers with a diverse range of bands including Nazareth, Pilot and Byzantium. He played synthesizer on several high-profile recordings, including Elton John's "Rocket Man" and "Funeral for a Friend" from the Goodbye Yellow Brick Road album. "Funeral for a Friend" featured an early analogue synthesizer, the ARP 2500, to create tonal feeling and effect.

After leaving Trident in 1974, he produced his own album Startling Music for Ringo Starr's short-lived record label, Ring O' Records, consisting of a song-by-song, instrumental cover of Starr's album Ringo and featuring performances by Phil Collins, David Cole, Ronnie Caryl, John Gilbert (the son of Lewis Gilbert) and Starr. He then began a successful collaboration with the band Genesis which resulted in four albums beginning with A Trick of the Tail in 1976 and continuing through to Duke in 1980.

In 1975, he recorded 'Oh My My', an instrumental/keyboard version of Ringo Starr's 1973 song.

In 1980, Hentschel worked closely with Mike Oldfield on his album QE2, with a writing credit for the title track as well as album credits for synthesizers, drums, vocals, and horn arrangement. QE2 would become the best-selling album of 1981 in Germany.

In 1982, Hentschel collaborated with lyricist Don Black on a song cycle album for Marti Webb to follow her success with Tell Me on a Sunday. I'm Not That Kind of Girl was released in 1983. Despite including the talent of Phil Collins on drums and Kiki Dee on backing vocals, it failed to chart and was Webb's last album for Polydor.

In 1988, Hentschel produced and engineered the Grammy Award-winning album Politics, by the jazz fusion band Yellowjackets.

In the 1980s and 1990s, Hentschel coproduced, engineered, and/or played keyboards and synthesizers on five albums by Police guitarist Andy Summers: the rock vocal album XYZ (MCA Records, 1987) and the primarily instrumental albums Mysterious Barricades (just Summers and Hentschel, Private Music, 1988), The Golden Wire (Private Music, 1989), Charming Snakes (Private Music, 1990), and Synaesthesia (CMP Records, 1995).

Hentschel composed scores for The Squeeze (1977) along with the Lewis Gilbert films Operation Daybreak (1975), Seven Nights in Japan (1976) and Educating Rita (1983).

Relocating to Los Angeles in 1985, Hentschel established one of the first dedicated MIDI studios and worked with Ensoniq on developing instruments and custom sounds. He eventually moved back to Great Britain and continued to produce, compose and arrange on both sides of the Atlantic.

Hentschel also worked as an engineer, musician, producer and arranger for a number of Contemporary Christian music artists including Out of Eden, Jennifer Knapp, Point of Grace and P.O.D. Hentschel has recently produced prog/harp band Art in America which was recorded in Los Angeles. He was heavily involved in developing new artists.

== Discography ==
- 1975 – Startling Music – Starring Phil Collins on drums and percussions, David Cole also on drums, Ronnie Caryl on acoustic and electric guitars, Jack D. Glenliver and Richard Starkey on Finger Clicks and David Hentschel on piano and keyboards.
- 1983 : Educating Rita (Original Motion Picture Soundtrack)
