= BBC Broadcasts =

Live album by Genesis

- LP edition cover art

Box set by Genesis
- Released: 3 March 2023
- Recorded: 1970–1998
- Genres: Progressive rock; pop rock; soft rock
- Length: 349:43 (CD); 144:01 (LP)
- Label: EMI
- Producers: Genesis; Nick Davis

Genesis chronology
The Last Domino? – The Hits (2021)	BBC Broadcasts (2023)

BBC Broadcasts is a box set by the English rock band Genesis. It was released on 3 March 2023 by EMI Records.

== Background ==
BBC Broadcasts was announced on 12 January 2023. The set was curated by keyboardist Tony Banks and their longtime engineer and producer Nick Davis, who had also remastered the band's back catalogue for the Genesis 1970–1975, Genesis 1976–1982, and Genesis 1983–1998 box sets in 2007 and 2008.

The album was released in two formats:

- 5-CD edition featuring performances ranging from their 1970 lineup of Banks/Gabriel/Mayhew/Phillips/Rutherford to the 1998 tour with Ray Wilson as vocalist.
- A 3-LP edition collecting highlights from the full set.

The album marks the first release of the band's 1980 Lyceum Theatre (which includes the entire "Duke Suite") in an audio-only format; it had previously received a release in video format.

"Duke's Travels" and "Duke's End" had been released on Archive 2: 1976–1992, while "Follow You Follow Me" is the same performance as on the original Three Sides Live album. Two more songs from the same show have been previously available on rather obscure releases: "Turn It On Again" on a US 12" promo and "The Lady Lies" on a UK flexidisc. The Genesis Archive versions of the latter song and "Ripples" were recorded on May 6, while "Deep in the Motherlode" and "One For The Vine" come from May 5 at Drury Lane.

The concert movie from Wembley Stadium 1987, later also included in The Movie Box 1981–2007, was filmed on July 2 and 3, whereas the broadcast in this set was recorded on July 4.

Additionally, it includes the first officially released live performances from Ray Wilson's tenure with the band (aside from the three acoustic performances on the "Not About Us" single).

"Shepherd", "Pacidy", and "Let Us Now Make Love" were previously released on Extra Tracks 1970–1975. Those three tracks plus "Stagnation" had first appeared on Archive 1967–75.

== Track listing ==
=== CD edition ===
Disc one
No.	Title	Writer(s)	Source	Length
1.	"Shepherd^{[*]}"	Tony Banks; Peter Gabriel; Anthony Phillips; Mike Rutherford	Night Ride, February 1970	4:02
2.	"Pacidy^{[*]}"	Banks; Gabriel; Phillips; Rutherford	Night Ride, February 1970	5:45
3.	"Let Us Now Make Love"	Banks; Gabriel; Phillips; Rutherford	Night Ride, February 1970	6:13
4.	"The Fountain of Salmacis"	Banks; Phil Collins; Gabriel; Steve Hackett; Rutherford	In Concert, March 1972	7:50
5.	"The Musical Box"	Banks; Collins; Gabriel; Hackett; Rutherford	In Concert, March 1972	10:32
6.	"Stagnation"	Banks; Gabriel; Phillips; Rutherford	Sounds of the 70s, May 1971	8:55
7.	"Harlequin"	Banks; Collins; Gabriel; Hackett; Rutherford	Sounds of the 70s, January 1972	2:47
8.	"Get 'Em Out by Friday"	Banks; Collins; Gabriel; Hackett; Rutherford	Top Gear, September 1972	8:47
9.	"Harold the Barrel"	Banks; Collins; Gabriel; Hackett; Rutherford	Sounds of the 70s, January 1972	2:58
10.	"Twilight Alehouse"	Banks; Gabriel; Phillips; Rutherford	Top Gear, September 1972	8:04
11.	"Watcher of the Skies"	Banks; Collins; Gabriel; Hackett; Rutherford	In Concert, April 1975	7:47

Notes

- * On the US edition on Rhino, the first two tracks are swapped, but the packaging does not reflect this, so the two tracks are mislabeled. The European edition on UMC does not have this problem.
- Tracks 1–3 recorded at Studio 4 of Maida Vale Studios in Maida Vale, London on 22 February 1970.
- Track 2 is erroneously co-credited to Phil Collins, who had not joined the band at that point
- Tracks 4–5 recorded live at the Paris Studios in London on 2 March 1972 during the Nursery Cryme tour.
- Tracks 6–10 recorded at Studio T1 of the Kensington House in Shepherd's Bush, London.
  - Track 6 recorded 10 May 1971 during the Trespass tour.
  - Tracks 7 and 9 recorded 9 January 1972 during the Nursery Cryme tour.
  - Tracks 8 and 10 recorded 25 September 1972 during the Foxtrot tour.
- Track 11 recorded live at the Empire Pool in Wembley, London on 15 April 1975 during The Lamb Lies Down on Broadway tour.

Disc two
No.	Title	Writer(s)	Source	Length
1.	"Squonk"	Banks; Rutherford	Knebworth Festival, June 1978	7:21
2.	"Burning Rope"	Banks	Knebworth Festival, June 1978	7:27
3.	"Dance on a Volcano"	Banks; Collins; Hackett; Rutherford	Knebworth Festival, June 1978	4:25
4.	"Drum Duet"	Collins; Chester Thompson	Knebworth Festival, June 1978	1:18
5.	"Los Endos"	Banks; Collins; Hackett; Rutherford	Knebworth Festival, June 1978	5:56
6.	"Deep in the Motherlode"	Rutherford	Lyceum Theatre, May 1980	6:00
7.	"Dancing with the Moonlit Knight (Opening Section)"	Banks; Collins; Gabriel; Hackett; Rutherford	Lyceum Theatre, May 1980	1:52
8.	"The Carpet Crawlers"	Banks; Collins; Gabriel; Hackett; Rutherford	Lyceum Theatre, May 1980	5:31
9.	"One for the Vine"	Banks	Lyceum Theatre, May 1980	11:10
10.	"Behind the Lines"	Banks; Collins; Rutherford	Lyceum Theatre, May 1980	5:39
11.	"Duchess"	Banks; Collins; Rutherford	Lyceum Theatre, May 1980	6:56
12.	"Guide Vocal"	Banks	Lyceum Theatre, May 1980	1:28
13.	"Turn It On Again"	Banks; Collins; Rutherford	Lyceum Theatre, May 1980	4:47
14.	"Duke's Travels"	Banks; Collins; Rutherford	Lyceum Theatre, May 1980	7:18
15.	"Duke's End"	Banks; Collins; Rutherford	Lyceum Theatre, May 1980	2:14

Notes

- Tracks 1–5 recorded live on 24 June 1978 during the And Then There Were Three tour.
- Tracks 6–8, 10-15 recorded live on 7 May 1980, and Track 9 recorded on 6 May 1980, during the Duke tour.

Disc three
No.	Title	Writer(s)	Source	Length
1.	"Say It's Alright Joe"	Rutherford	Lyceum Theatre, May 1980	7:58
2.	"The Lady Lies"	Banks	Lyceum Theatre, May 1980	6:22
3.	"Ripples..."	Banks; Rutherford	Lyceum Theatre, May 1980	10:05
4.	"In the Cage"	Banks; Collins; Gabriel; Hackett; Rutherford	Lyceum Theatre, May 1980	7:35
5.	"The Colony of Slippermen: The Raven"	Banks; Collins; Gabriel; Hackett; Rutherford	Lyceum Theatre, May 1980	1:07
6.	"Afterglow"	Banks	Lyceum Theatre, May 1980	4:35
7.	"Follow You Follow Me"	Banks; Collins; Rutherford	Lyceum Theatre, May 1980	4:39
8.	"I Know What I Like (In Your Wardrobe)"	Banks; Collins; Gabriel; Hackett; Rutherford	Lyceum Theatre, May 1980	9:35
9.	"The Knife"	Banks; Gabriel; Phillips; Rutherford	Lyceum Theatre, May 1980	3:52
10.	"Mama"	Banks; Collins; Rutherford	Wembley Stadium, July 1987	6:30
11.	"Domino"; I. "In the Glow of the Night"; II. "The Last Domino"	Banks; Collins; Rutherford	Wembley Stadium, July 1987	11:09

Notes

- Tracks 1–9 recorded live on 7 May 1980 during the Duke tour.
- Tracks 10–11 recorded live on 4 July 1987 during the Invisible Touch tour.

Disc four
No.	Title	Writer(s)	Source	Length
1.	"That's All"	Banks; Collins; Rutherford	Wembley Stadium, July 1987	4:59
2.	"The Brazilian"	Banks; Collins; Rutherford	Wembley Stadium, July 1987	5:17
3.	"Throwing It All Away"	Banks; Collins; Rutherford	Wembley Stadium, July 1987	6:48
4.	"Home by the Sea"	Banks; Collins; Rutherford	Wembley Stadium, July 1987	5:19
5.	"Second Home by the Sea"	Banks; Collins; Rutherford	Wembley Stadium, July 1987	6:38
6.	"Invisible Touch"	Banks; Collins; Rutherford	Wembley Stadium, July 1987	5:14
7.	"Drum Duet"	Collins; Thompson	Wembley Stadium, July 1987	5:54
8.	"Los Endos"	Banks; Collins; Hackett; Rutherford	Wembley Stadium, July 1987	7:00
9.	"Not About Us"	Banks; Rutherford; Ray Wilson	NEC Arena, February 1998	3:08
10.	"The Dividing Line"	Banks; Rutherford	NEC Arena, February 1998	10:11

Notes

- Tracks 1–8 recorded live on 4 July 1987 during the Invisible Touch tour.
- Tracks 9–10 recorded live on 25 and 26 February 1998 during the Calling All Stations tour.

Disc five
No.	Title	Writer(s)	Source	Length
1.	"No Son of Mine"	Banks; Collins; Rutherford	Knebworth Festival, August 1992	7:12
2.	"Driving the Last Spike"	Banks; Collins; Rutherford	Knebworth Festival, August 1992	10:27
3.	"Old Medley"; I. "Dance on a Volcano"; II. "The Lamb Lies Down on Broadway"; III. "The Musical Box"; IV. "Firth of Fifth"; V. "I Know What I Like (In Your Wardrobe); VI. "That's All"; VII. "Illegal Alien"; VIII. "Follow You, Follow Me""	Banks; Collins; Gabriel; Hackett; Rutherford	Knebworth Festival, August 1992	19:56
4.	"Fading Lights"	Banks; Collins; Rutherford	Knebworth Festival, August 1992	10:54
5.	"Hold on My Heart"	Banks; Collins; Rutherford	Knebworth Festival, August 1992	6:03
6.	"I Can't Dance"	Banks; Collins; Rutherford	Knebworth Festival, August 1992	8:14

Notes

- All tracks recorded live on 2 August 1992 during the We Can't Dance tour.

=== LP edition ===
Side one
No.	Title	Writer(s)	Source	Length
1.	"The Musical Box"	Banks; Collins; Gabriel; Hackett; Rutherford	In Concert, March 1972	10:32
2.	"Stagnation"	Banks; Gabriel; Phillips; Rutherford	Sounds of the 70s, May 1971	8:55
3.	"Harlequin"	Banks; Collins; Gabriel; Hackett; Rutherford	Sounds of the 70s, January 1972	2:47
4.	"Harold the Barrel"	Banks; Collins; Gabriel; Hackett; Rutherford	Sounds of the 70s, January 1972	2:58
Total length:				23:12

Notes

- Track 1 recorded live at the Paris Studios in London on 2 March 1972 during the Nursery Cryme tour.
- Track 2–4 recorded at Studio T1 of the Kensington House in Shepherd's Bush, London.
  - Track 2 recorded 10 May 1971 during the Trespass tour.
  - Track 3 and 4 recorded 9 January 1972 during the Nursery Cryme tour.

Side two
No.	Title	Writer(s)	Source	Length
1.	"Get 'Em Out by Friday"	Banks; Collins; Gabriel; Hackett; Rutherford	Top Gear, September 1972	8:47
2.	"Watcher of the Skies"	Banks; Collins; Gabriel; Hackett; Rutherford	In Concert, April 1975	7:47
3.	"Dancing with the Moonlit Knight (Opening Section)"	Banks; Collins; Gabriel; Hackett; Rutherford	Lyceum Theatre, May 1980	1:52
4.	"The Carpet Crawlers"	Banks; Collins; Gabriel; Hackett; Rutherford	Lyceum Theatre, May 1980	5:31
Total length:				22:57

Notes

- Track 1 recorded at Studio T1 of the Kensington House in Shepherd's Bush, London on 25 September 1972 during the Foxtrot tour.
- Track 2 recorded live at the Empire Pool in Wembley, London on 15 April 1975 during The Lamb Lies Down on Broadway tour.
- Track 3 and 4 recorded live on 7 May 1980 during the Duke tour.

Side three
No.	Title	Writer(s)	Source	Length
1.	"Behind the Lines"	Banks; Collins; Rutherford	Lyceum Theatre, May 1980	5:39
2.	"Duchess"	Banks; Collins; Rutherford	Lyceum Theatre, May 1980	6:56
3.	"Guide Vocal"	Banks; Collins; Rutherford	Lyceum Theatre, May 1980	1:28
4.	"Duke's Travels"	Banks; Collins; Rutherford	Lyceum Theatre, May 1980	7:18
5.	"Duke's End"	Banks; Collins; Rutherford	Lyceum Theatre, May 1980	2:14
Total length:				23:34

Notes

- All tracks recorded live on 7 May 1980 during the Duke tour.

Side four
No.	Title	Writer(s)	Source	Length
1.	"Say It's Alright Joe"	Rutherford	Lyceum Theatre, May 1980	7:58
2.	"The Lady Lies"	Banks	Lyceum Theatre, May 1980	6:22
3.	"I Know What I Like (In Your Wardrobe)"	Banks; Collins; Gabriel; Hackett; Rutherford	Lyceum Theatre, May 1980	9:35
Total length:				23:55

Notes

- All tracks recorded live on 7 May 1980 during the Duke tour.

Side five
No.	Title	Writer(s)	Source	Length
1.	"Mama"	Banks; Collins; Rutherford	Wembley Stadium, July 1987	6:30
2.	"That's All"	Banks; Collins; Rutherford	Wembley Stadium, July 1987	4:59
3.	"Home by the Sea"	Banks; Collins; Rutherford	Wembley Stadium, July 1987	5:19
4.	"Second Home by the Sea"	Banks; Collins; Rutherford	Wembley Stadium, July 1987	6:38
Total length:				23:26

Notes

- All tracks recorded live on 4 July 1987 during the Invisible Touch tour.

Side six
No.	Title	Writer(s)	Source	Length
1.	"Throwing It All Away"	Banks; Collins; Rutherford	Wembley Stadium, July 1987	6:48
2.	"No Son of Mine"	Banks; Collins; Rutherford	Knebworth Festival, August 1992	7:12
3.	"Driving the Last Spike"	Banks; Collins; Rutherford	Knebworth Festival, August 1992	10:27
Total length:				24:27

Notes

- Track 1 recorded live on 4 July 1987 during the Invisible Touch tour.
- Track 2 and 3 recorded live on 2 August 1992 during the We Can't Dance tour.

== Personnel ==
- Tony Banks – keyboards, backing vocals (all tracks), co-lead vocals (disc 1, track 1)
- Mike Rutherford – bass, guitars, backing vocals (all tracks)
- Phil Collins – lead vocals (disc 2, 3, 5: all tracks, disc 4: tracks 1–8), drums, percussion (disc 1: tracks 4–11, disc 2: tracks 4–5, 9, 14–15, disc 4: tracks 2, 7–8), backing vocals (disc 1: tracks 4–11)
- Peter Gabriel – lead vocals, flute (disc 1: all tracks)
- Steve Hackett – guitars (disc 1: tracks 4–11)
- Daryl Stuermer – guitars, bass (disc 2, 3, 5: all tracks, disc 4: tracks 1–8)
- Chester Thompson – drums, percussion (disc 2, 3, 5: all tracks, disc 4: tracks 1–8)
- Anthony Phillips – guitars, backing vocals (disc 1: tracks 1–3)
- John Mayhew – drums, percussion (disc 1: tracks 1–3)
- Ray Wilson – lead vocals (disc 4: tracks 9–10)
- Nir Zidkyahu – drums, percussion (disc 4: tracks 9–10)
- Anthony Drennan – bass, guitars (disc 4: tracks 9–10)

== Charts ==
Chart performance for BBC Broadcasts
Chart (2023)	Peak position
Austrian Albums (Ö3 Austria)	47
Belgian Albums (Ultratop Flanders)	32
Belgian Albums (Ultratop Wallonia)	18
Dutch Albums (Album Top 100)	11
French Albums (SNEP)	71
German Albums (Offizielle Top 100)	3
Italian Albums (FIMI)	90
Japanese Hot Albums (Billboard Japan)	71
Portuguese Albums (AFP)	20
Scottish Albums (Official Charts)	8
Swiss Albums (Schweizer Hitparade)	14
UK Albums (Official Charts)	23
UK Rock & Metal Albums (Official Charts)	1
