= We Can't Dance Tour =

1992 concert tour by Genesis

- Tour by Genesis
- Location: Europe; North America
- Associated album: We Can't Dance
- Start date: 8 May 1992
- End date: 17 November 1992
- Legs: 3
- No. of shows: 71

Genesis concert chronology
- Invisible Touch Tour (1986–87); We Can't Dance Tour (1992); Calling All Stations Tour (1997–98)

Following the release of We Can't Dance, Genesis spent 13 weeks performing 55 concerts between May and July 1992, with a 16-date UK tour in October/November.

== Background ==
The popular worldwide tour sold out arenas and stadiums (where they played on the U.S. leg of the tour). This proved to be Collins's last tour with Genesis until the band reunited in 2007. The album was re-released as a SACD/DVD double disc set (including new 5.1 and Stereo mixes) in October 2007. During the recording of We Can't Dance a 40-minute documentary called No Admittance was produced and broadcast on the Disney Channel. It has since been included in the bonus DVD released in 2007.

The "We Can't Dance" tour featured shows in large arenas and stadiums throughout North America and Europe. It would be the band's final full-length tour until the 2007 Turn It On Again reunion tour. The tour is captured live on the albums The Way We Walk, Volume One: The Shorts, The Way We Walk, Volume Two: The Longs and the concert video The Way We Walk - Live in Concert.

== Set list ==
This set list is an average for the tour and it contains every song that they played on the tour. Songs that were only played occasionally are noted down.

1. "Land of Confusion"
2. "No Son of Mine"
3. "Driving the Last Spike"
4. "Old Medley" (also including short excerpts/teasers from "That's All", "Illegal Alien", "Your Own Special Way" or "Misunderstanding", "Follow You Follow Me", "Stagnation")
  1. "Dance on a Volcano"
  2. "The Lamb Lies Down On Broadway"
  3. "The Musical Box" (closing section)
  4. "Firth of Fifth" (instrumental bridge)
  5. "I Know What I Like (In Your Wardrobe)"
5. "Throwing It All Away" (eliminated after August 2, but was performed twice on the third and final leg of the tour)
6. "Fading Lights"
7. "Jesus He Knows Me"
8. "The Carpet Crawlers" (only performed on October 23)
9. "Dreaming While You Sleep" (only performed from May 8 - June 25 and October 28 - November 15)
10. "Home by the Sea"/"Second Home by the Sea"
11. "Hold on My Heart"
12. "Mama" (dropped after May 28)
13. "Domino"
14. "Drum Duet"
15. "I Can't Dance"

Encore

1. "Tonight, Tonight, Tonight"
2. "Invisible Touch"
3. "Turn It On Again"

== Tour dates ==
List of 1992 concerts
Date	City	Country	Venue	Attendance	Box Office
7 May 1992 (Note: The 7 May 1992 concert in Irving was a dress rehearsal.)	Irving	United States	Texas Stadium	—N/a	—N/a
8 May 1992	Irving	United States	Texas Stadium	—N/a	—N/a
9 May 1992	Houston	United States	Astrodome	—N/a	—N/a
16 May 1992	Miami Gardens	United States	Joe Robbie Stadium	42,117 / 49,700	$1,087,515
17 May 1992	Tampa	United States	Tampa Stadium	—	—
19 May 1992	Washington, D.C.	United States	Robert F. Kennedy Memorial Stadium	—N/a	—N/a
21 May 1992	Indianapolis	United States	Hoosier Dome	—N/a	—N/a
22 May 1992	Columbus	United States	Ohio Stadium	71,550 / 71,550	$1,788,750
24 May 1992	Pontiac	United States	Pontiac Silverdome	36,169 / 45,000	$904,225
25 May 1992	Cleveland	United States	Cleveland Stadium	49,184 / 53,000	$1,229,600
26 May 1992	Pittsburgh	United States	Three Rivers Stadium	42,790 / 45,000	$1,047,668
28 May 1992	Foxborough	United States	Foxboro Stadium	40,982 / 40,982	$1,033,290
29 May 1992	Montreal	Canada	Olympic Stadium	53,000 / 53,000	$1,505,394
31 May 1992	Philadelphia	United States	Veterans Stadium	97,774 / 97,774	$1,518,080
1 June 1992	Philadelphia	United States	Veterans Stadium	97,774 / 97,774	$1,518,080
2 June 1992	East Rutherford	United States	Giants Stadium	97,311 / 108,000	$2,396,000
3 June 1992	East Rutherford	United States	Giants Stadium	97,311 / 108,000	$2,396,000
5 June 1992	Syracuse	United States	Carrier Dome	63,636 / 76,704 (Note: The score data is combined from the shows held at Carrier Dome from 5 and 7 June 1992 respectively.)	$1,483,106
6 June 1992	Toronto	Canada	SkyDome	55,770 / 55,770	$1,466,794
7 June 1992	Syracuse	United States	Carrier Dome	—	—
9 June 1992	Madison	United States	Camp Randall Stadium	48,015 / 52,000	$1,146,600
10 June 1992	Minneapolis	United States	Hubert H. Humphrey Metrodome	—N/a	—N/a
12 June 1992	Edmonton	Canada	Commonwealth Stadium	—N/a	—N/a
14 June 1992	Vancouver	Canada	BC Place Stadium	—N/a	—N/a
15 June 1992	Tacoma	United States	Tacoma Dome	17,601 / 22,835	$484,028
18 June 1992	Los Angeles	United States	Dodger Stadium	—N/a	—N/a
19 June 1992	Sacramento	United States	Hornet Stadium	—N/a	—N/a
20 June 1992 (Note: The 20 June 1992 concert in Oakland was part of Day on the Green.)	Oakland	United States	Oakland–Alameda County Coliseum	41,236 / 45,500	$1,175,226
23 June 1992	Ames	United States	Cyclone Stadium	32,090 / 37,500	$802,250
24 June 1992	Tinley Park	United States	World Music Theatre	47,692 / 56,000	$1,312,022
25 June 1992	Tinley Park	United States	World Music Theatre	47,692 / 56,000	$1,312,022
28 June 1992 (Note: The 28 June 1992 concert in Werchter was part of Rock Werchter.)	Werchter	Belgium	Werchter festival ground	—N/a	—N/a
30 June 1992	Lyon	France	Stade de Gerland	—N/a	—N/a
2 July 1992 (Note: The 1 July 1992 concert in Paris was cancelled due to French truck drivers strike.)	Paris	France	Hippodrome de Vincennes	—N/a	—N/a
3 July 1992	Gelsenkirchen	Germany	Parkstadion	—N/a	—N/a
4 July 1992	Hockenheim	Germany	Hockenheimring	—N/a	—N/a
8 July 1992 (Note: The 7 July 1992 concert in Gothenburg was cancelled due to French lorry drivers strike.)	Gothenburg	Sweden	Ullevi	—N/a	—N/a
10 July 1992	Hanover	Germany	Niedersachsenstadion	—N/a	—N/a
11 July 1992	Hanover	Germany	Niedersachsenstadion	—N/a	—N/a
12 July 1992	Berlin	Germany	Maifeld	—N/a	—N/a
13 July 1992	Hanover	Germany	Niedersachsenstadion	—N/a	—N/a
15 July 1992	Mannheim	Germany	Maimarktgelände	—N/a	—N/a
16 July 1992	Vienna	Austria	Praterstadion	—N/a	—N/a
17 July 1992 (Note: The 17 July 1992 concert in Munich was originally scheduled to take place on 5 July 1992.)	Munich	Germany	Olympiastadion	—N/a	—N/a
19 July 1992	Nice	France	Stade Charles-Ehrmann	—N/a	—N/a
20 July 1992	Montpellier	France	Espace de Grammont	—N/a	—N/a
22 July 1992	Lisbon	Portugal	Estádio José Alvalade	—N/a	—N/a
26 July 1992	Basel	Switzerland	St. Jakob Stadium	—N/a	—N/a
27 July 1992	Cologne	Germany	Müngersdorfer Stadion	—N/a	—N/a
28 July 1992	Rotterdam	Netherlands	Stadion Feijenoord	—N/a	—N/a
29 July 1992	Kiel	Germany	Nordmarksportfeld	—N/a	—N/a
31 July 1992	Leeds	England	Roundhay Park	—N/a	—N/a
2 August 1992 (Note: The 2 August 1992 concert in Stevenage was part of Knebworth Festival.)	Stevenage	England	Knebworth Park	—N/a	—N/a
23 October 1992	Southampton	England	Mayflower Theatre	—N/a	—N/a
28 October 1992	Newcastle	England	Newcastle City Hall	—N/a	—N/a
29 October 1992	Edinburgh	Scotland	Edinburgh Playhouse	—N/a	—N/a
30 October 1992	Manchester	England	Manchester Apollo	—N/a	—N/a
2 November 1992	London	England	Earls Court Exhibition Centre	—N/a	—N/a
3 November 1992	London	England	Earls Court Exhibition Centre	—N/a	—N/a
4 November 1992	London	England	Earls Court Exhibition Centre	—N/a	—N/a
6 November 1992	London	England	Earls Court Exhibition Centre	—N/a	—N/a
7 November 1992	London	England	Earls Court Exhibition Centre	—N/a	—N/a
8 November 1992	London	England	Earls Court Exhibition Centre	—N/a	—N/a
10 November 1992	Paignton	England	Torbay Leisure Centre	—N/a	—N/a
11 November 1992 (Note: The 11 November 1992 concert in Newport was originally scheduled to take place on 25 October 1992.)	Newport	Wales	Newport Leisure Centre	—N/a	—N/a
13 November 1992	Nottingham	England	Nottingham Royal Concert Hall	—N/a	—N/a
15 November 1992	Brighton	England	Brighton Centre	—N/a	—N/a
16 November 1992 (Note: The 16 November 1992 concert in London was a charity show in aid of The Prince's Trust)	London	England	Royal Albert Hall	—N/a	—N/a
17 November 1992 (Note: The 17 November 1992 concert in Wolverhampton was originally scheduled to take place on 26 October 1992.)	Wolverhampton	England	Wolverhampton Civic Hall	—N/a	—N/a
Total				826,917 / 910,315 (91%)	$20,380,548 ($37,595,937 in 2020)

== Personnel ==
Genesis

- Phil Collins – lead vocals, drums, percussion
- Tony Banks – keyboards, backing vocals
- Mike Rutherford – guitars, bass, backing vocals

Additional Musicians

- Daryl Stuermer – bass, guitar, backing vocals
- Chester Thompson – drums, percussion
