= The Last Domino? – The Hits =

Greatest hits album by Genesis
- Released: 17 September 2021
- Recorded: 1973–1991
- Genre: Progressive rock
- Length: 76:57 (Disc 1); 77:36 (Disc 2)
- Label: Virgin
- Producer: Tony Banks; Phil Collins; Mike Rutherford; David Hentschel; Hugh Padgham; Nick Davis; Peter Gabriel; Steve Hackett; John Burns

Genesis chronology
R-Kive (2014)	The Last Domino? – The Hits (2021)	BBC Broadcasts (2023)

The Last Domino? – The Hits is a greatest hits album by the English rock band Genesis, released on 17 September 2021 by Virgin Records. The set coincides with The Last Domino? Tour, staged following the announcement of their reunion after a 13-year hiatus. It features songs originally released between Selling England by the Pound (1973) and We Can't Dance (1991).

== Track listing ==
All songs written by Tony Banks, Phil Collins and Mike Rutherford, except where noted.

Disc one
No.	Title	Writer(s)	Origin	Length
1.	"Duke's End"		Duke (1980)	2:06
2.	"Turn It On Again"		Duke	3:51
3.	"Mama"		Genesis (1983)	6:50
4.	"Land of Confusion"		Invisible Touch (1986)	4:45
5.	"Home by the Sea"		Genesis	5:07
6.	"Second Home by the Sea"		Genesis	6:06
7.	"Fading Lights"		We Can't Dance (1991)	10:18
8.	"The Cinema Show"	Tony Banks; Phil Collins; Peter Gabriel; Steve Hackett; Mike Rutherford	Selling England by the Pound (1973)	10:48
9.	"Afterglow"	Tony Banks	Wind & Wuthering (1976)	4:18
10.	"Hold on My Heart"		We Can't Dance	4:37
11.	"Jesus He Knows Me"		We Can't Dance (1991)	4:13
12.	"That's All"		Genesis	4:24
13.	"The Lamb Lies Down on Broadway"	Tony Banks; Phil Collins; Peter Gabriel; Steve Hackett; Mike Rutherford	The Lamb Lies Down on Broadway (1974)	4:53
14.	"In Too Deep"		Invisible Touch	5:02

Disc two
No.	Title	Writer(s)	Origin	Length
1.	"Follow You Follow Me"		...And Then There Were Three... (1978)	3:59
2.	"Duchess"		Duke	6:37
3.	"No Son of Mine"		We Can't Dance	6:39
4.	"Firth of Fifth"	Tony Banks; Phil Collins; Peter Gabriel; Steve Hackett; Mike Rutherford	Selling England by the Pound	9:30
5.	"I Know What I Like (In Your Wardrobe)"	Tony Banks; Phil Collins; Peter Gabriel; Steve Hackett; Mike Rutherford	Selling England by the Pound	4:08
6.	"Domino"		Invisible Touch	10:44
7.	"Throwing It All Away"		Invisible Touch	3:49
8.	"Tonight, Tonight, Tonight"		Invisible Touch	8:51
9.	"Invisible Touch"		Invisible Touch	3:28
10.	"I Can't Dance"		We Can't Dance	3:59
11.	"Dancing with the Moonlit Knight"	Tony Banks; Phil Collins; Peter Gabriel; Steve Hackett; Mike Rutherford	Selling England by the Pound	8:00
12.	"The Carpet Crawlers"	Tony Banks; Phil Collins; Peter Gabriel; Steve Hackett; Mike Rutherford	The Lamb Lies Down on Broadway	5:14
13.	"Abacab" (edit)		Abacab, 1981	4:09

== Personnel ==
- Tony Banks – keyboards, 12 string guitar
- Mike Rutherford – lead guitar (except below), bass guitar, 12 string guitar
- Phil Collins – drums, lead vocals (except below)
- Steve Hackett – guitar on "The Cinema Show", "The Lamb Lies Down on Broadway", "Firth of Fifth", "I Know What I Like (In Your Wardrobe)", "Dancing with the Moonlit Knight", "The Carpet Crawlers", "Afterglow"
- Peter Gabriel – lead vocals, flute on "The Cinema Show", "The Lamb Lies Down on Broadway", "Firth of Fifth", "I Know What I Like (In Your Wardrobe)", "Dancing with the Moonlit Knight", "The Carpet Crawlers"

== Charts ==
Chart performance for The Last Domino? – The Hits
Chart (2021)	Peak position
Austrian Albums (Ö3 Austria)	36
Belgian Albums (Ultratop Flanders)	41
Belgian Albums (Ultratop Wallonia)	27
Canadian Albums (Billboard)	100
German Albums (Offizielle Top 100)	8
Scottish Albums (OCC)	2
Swiss Albums (Schweizer Hitparade)	14
UK Albums (OCC)	9
UK Rock & Metal Albums (OCC)	1
