= Genesis 1983–1998 =

Box set by Genesis
- Released: 1 October 2007 (Europe); 20 November 2007 (North America)
- Recorded: 1983–1998
- Genres: Pop rock; art rock
- Length: Audio: 4:36:59; Video: 7:17:24
- Labels: Virgin/EMI (Europe & Japan); Atlantic/Rhino (North America)
- Producers: Genesis, Hugh Padgham, Nick Davis

Genesis chronology
Genesis 1976–1982 (2007)	Genesis 1983–1998 (2007)	Live over Europe 2007 (2007)

Professional ratings
Review scores
Source	Rating
AllMusic	3.5/5 stars

Genesis 1983–1998 is a box set of four studio albums by Genesis. It was released on 1 October 2007 in Europe & Japan by Virgin/EMI and on 20 November 2007 in North America by Atlantic/Rhino. The 5-CD/5-DVD box set includes newly remixed versions of the albums Genesis, Invisible Touch, We Can't Dance, and ...Calling All Stations.... The fifth pair of discs includes B-side songs. Each bonus DVD features audio versions of the albums in 5.1 surround sound, as well as videos for songs from that album and its corresponding tour, new interviews, and photo galleries.

== Audio formats ==
In the European and Japanese releases of this box set, the CDs are hybrid SACD/CDs. The SACD layer is a multichannel surround sound remix.

In the Canadian and U.S. releases of this box set, standard CDs with no SACD layer are included.

In all versions of the box set, the DVDs are DVD-Video format (not DVD-Audio), although they contain both audio and video tracks. These DVDs include three audio mixes: DTS 5.1-channel surround sound, Dolby Digital 5.1-channel surround sound, and Dolby Digital stereo. The DTS surround sound is a slightly compressed version of the surround sound on the SACDs, and the Dolby surround sound is a slightly inferior quality to the DTS.

All of the audio tracks on these CDs were remixed in stereo and surround sound by producer Nick Davis.

The seven letters on the "Genesis" logo contain the album art from the following albums:

- The "G" is from We Can't Dance.
- The first "E" is from Genesis.
- The "N" is from ...Calling All Stations....
- The second "E" is from Invisible Touch.
- The first "S" is from We Can't Dance.
- The "I" is from ...Calling All Stations....
- The second "S" is from Invisible Touch.

== Track listing ==
=== Genesis ===
CD

1	"Mama"	6:53
2	"That's All"	4:26
3	"Home by the Sea"	5:07
4	"Second Home by the Sea"	6:07
5	"Illegal Alien"	5:00
6	"Taking It All Too Hard"	3:58
7	"Just a Job to Do"	4:47
8	"Silver Rainbow"	4:31
9	"It's Gonna Get Better"	5:00
	Total	45:49

DVD

1	Videos			
	"Mama"	1983	5:15	
	"That's All"	1983	4:23	
	"Home by the Sea/Second Home by the Sea"	1983	11:11	
	"Illegal Alien"	1984	4:37	
2	Reissues Interview	2007	17:07	
3	Mama Tour Rehearsal	1983	58:11	
	"Dodo/Lurker"			
	"The Carpet Crawlers"			
	"That's All"			
	"Mama"			
	"Illegal Alien"			
	"Eleventh Earl of Mar/Ripples/Squonk/Firth of Fifth"			
	"Man on the Corner"			
	Who Dunnit?			
4	Genesis Tour Programme	1982		13-page gallery
5	Mama Tour Programme	1983-1984		18-page gallery
6	Six of the Best Programme	1982		10-page gallery
	Total		1:40:44	

=== Invisible Touch ===
CD

1	"Invisible Touch"	3:29
2	"Tonight, Tonight, Tonight"	8:53
3	"Land of Confusion"	4:47
4	"In Too Deep"	5:03
5	"Anything She Does"	4:20
6	"Domino"	10:45
7	"Throwing it All Away"	3:52
8	"The Brazilian"	4:57
	Total	46:06

DVD

1	Videos			
	"Invisible Touch"	1986	4:07	
	"Tonight, Tonight, Tonight"	1987	6:19	
	"Land of Confusion"	1986	5:30	
	"In Too Deep"	1987	4:40	
	"Anything She Does"	1987	6:02	
2	Reissues Interview	2007	19:06	
3	Visible Touch	1986	16:32	Tour documentary
4	Behind the Scenes: Land of Confusion	1986	8:43	
5	OGWT: Rock Around the Clock	1986	25:17	
6	Tour Programme	1986		23-page gallery
	Total		1:36:16	

=== We Can't Dance ===
CD

1	"No Son of Mine"	6:39
2	"Jesus He Knows Me"	4:16
3	"Driving the Last Spike"	10:09
4	"I Can't Dance"	4:01
5	"Never a Time"	3:50
6	"Dreaming While You Sleep"	7:17
7	"Tell Me Why"	4:59
8	"Living Forever"	5:41
9	"Hold on My Heart"	4:38
10	"Way of the World"	5:40
11	"Since I Lost You"	4:10
12	"Fading Lights"	10:20
	Total	1:11:40

DVD

1	Videos			
	"No Son of Mine"	1991	6:38	
	"Jesus He Knows Me"	1992	5:16	
	"I Can't Dance"	1991	4:52	
	"Tell Me Why"	1993	5:02	
	"Hold on My Heart"	1992	4:39	
2	Reissues Interview	2007	15:11	
3	No Admittance	1991	46:02	Studio documentary
4	UK Tour Programme	1992		24-page gallery
	Total		1:27:40	

=== Calling All Stations ===
CD

1	"Calling All Stations"	5:45
2	"Congo"	4:52
3	"Shipwrecked"	4:24
4	"Alien Afternoon"	7:54
5	"Not About Us"	4:40
6	"If That's What You Need"	5:13
7	"The Dividing Line"	7:45
8	"Uncertain Weather"	5:30
9	"Small Talk"	5:02
10	"There Must Be Some Other Way"	7:55
11	"One Man's Fool"	8:54
	Total	1:07:54

DVD

1	Videos			
	"Congo"	1997	3:43	
	"Shipwrecked"	1997	4:26	
	"Not About Us"	1998	4:20	
2	Reissues Interview	2007	18:05	
3	Calling All Stations EPK	1997	10:32	
4	Rock Im Park, Germany	1998	6:50	
	"Calling All Stations"			
5	Polish Television	1998	20:53	
	"There Must Be Some Other Way"			
	"The Dividing Line"			
6	Tour Programme	1998		13-page gallery
	Total		1:08:49	

=== Extra Tracks 1983 to 1998 ===
CD

1	"On the Shoreline"	1991	4:49	B-side on the "I Can't Dance" single
2	"Hearts on Fire"	1992	5:17	B-side on the "Jesus He Knows Me" single
3	"Do the Neurotic"	1986	7:07	B-side on the "In Too Deep" single
4	"Feeding the Fire"	1986	5:54	B-side on the "Land of Confusion" single
5	"I'd Rather Be You"	1986	4:04	B-side on the "Throwing it All Away" single
6	"Anything Now"	1998	7:03	B-side on the "Not About Us" single
7	"Sign Your Life Away"	1998	4:45	B-side on the "Not About Us" single
8	"Run Out of Time"	1998	6:31	B-side on the "Not About Us" single
	Total		45:30	

DVD

1	Reissues Interview	2007	3:21
2	Archive 2: '76 to '92 EPK	2000	18:55
3	Knebworth	1992	40:58
	"Old Medley"		
	"Home by the Sea"		
	"Domino (I. In the Glow of the Night/II. The Last Domino)"		
4	MMF Awards Ceremony	2000	20:41
	"Invisible Touch"		
	"Follow You Follow Me"		
	"I Can't Dance"		
	"Turn It On Again"		
	Total		1:23:55

The Extra Tracks disc omits several songs from the Calling All Stations era: "Papa He Said" and "Banjo Man" (from the "Congo" single), instrumental tracks "Phret" and "7/8" (from the "Shipwrecked" single), and the unreleased "Nowhere Else to Turn".

== Personnel ==
- Tony Banks – keyboards, background vocals
- Mike Rutherford – guitars, bass
- Phil Collins – drums, percussion, lead and backing vocals (except on Calling All Stations and tracks 6–8 of Extra Tracks 1983 To 1998)
- Ray Wilson – lead vocals, backing vocals (on Calling All Stations and tracks 6–8 of Extra Tracks 1983 To 1998)

Additional personnel

- Nir Zidkyahu – drums on all tracks of Calling All Stations except for tracks 4 (first half), 6, 8 and 9; drums on tracks 6–8 of Extra Tracks 1983 to 1998
- Nick D'Virgilio – drums on Calling All Stations tracks 4 (first half), 6, 8 and 9

== Charts ==
Chart (2007)	Peak position
German Albums (Offizielle Top 100)	57

== Formats ==
UK/EU Version: CD/SACD hybrid + DVD (PAL)
US/Canadian Version: CD + DVD (NTSC)
Japanese Version: CD/SACD hybrid + DVD (NTSC)
