= The Way We Walk =

The Way We Walk – Live in Concert

Video by Genesis
- Released: 29th March 1993
- Recorded: November 1992
- Genre: Rock, progressive rock
- Length: 135 min.
- Label: Virgin
- Producer: Various

Genesis chronology
The Way We Walk – Live in Concert (1993)	Genesis Live at Wembley Stadium (2003)

Professional ratings
Review scores
Source	Rating
Allmusic	3/5 stars

The Way We Walk – Live in Concert is a 1992 live video from the We Can't Dance tour by Genesis. The footage was videotaped on 6th, 7 and 8 November 1992 at Earls Court in London, and first released on VHS on the 29th March 1993 as Genesis Live – The Way We Walk – In Concert. It was also available on PAL format LaserDisc. On November 26, 2001, the video was reissued on DVD.

The songs on both the 1993 and 2001 releases are identical, although the concert on the 2001 DVD is split in half to accommodate the extra features. These include interviews, a feature-length commentary by the three band members (Tony Banks, Phil Collins and Mike Rutherford), multi-angle viewing options, and photo galleries.

The set list features eight hit singles, from "Turn It On Again" to "Jesus He Knows Me", next to longer album tracks such as "Fading Lights" and "Domino". Seven songs from We Can't Dance are performed. The "Old Medley" comprises excerpts from "Dance on a Volcano", "The Lamb Lies Down on Broadway", "The Musical Box", "Firth of Fifth" and "I Know What I Like (In Your Wardrobe)", and snippets of "That's All", "Illegal Alien", "Misunderstanding" and "Follow You Follow Me."

While the two live albums issued prior to this video separated the shorter songs from the longer ones, The Way We Walk – Live in Concert offered a chance to see them in their original context. The only songs included on The Way We Walk, Volume One: The Shorts but absent from the video are "Throwing It All Away", "Mama", "That's All" and "In Too Deep" (the final three having been recorded on the Invisible Touch tour); conversely, the tracks on The Way We Walk, Volume Two: The Longs all appear on the DVD. The only songs that appear on the video but not on either of the two live albums are "Turn It On Again" (though it was included as a B-side of one of the "Tell Me Why" CD singles in early 1993) and "Dreaming While You Sleep", which appears on Genesis Archive 2: 1976-1992.

== Track listing ==
Disc One

1. "Land of Confusion"
2. "No Son of Mine"
3. "Driving the Last Spike"
4. "Old Medley: (Dance on a Volcano / The Lamb Lies Down on Broadway / The Musical Box / Firth of Fifth / I Know What I Like (In Your Wardrobe) / That's All / Illegal Alien / Misunderstanding / Follow You, Follow Me / Stagnation / I Know What I Like (Reprise)
5. "Fading Lights"
6. "Jesus He Knows Me"

Disc Two

1. "Dreaming While You Sleep"
2. "Home by the Sea / Second Home by the Sea"
3. "Hold on My Heart"
4. "Domino"
5. "The Drum Thing"
6. "I Can't Dance"
7. "Tonight, Tonight, Tonight"
8. "Invisible Touch"
9. "Turn It On Again"

DVD extras:

- Interviews – with Collins, Rutherford, and Banks.
- Camera Angles – Sixteen camera angles are used throughout the disc.
- Slide Show – Still images captured from the tour and set to music.
- Original Tour Programme.
- Commentary with Collins, Banks, and Rutherford.

LaserDisc extras:

- "No Son of Mine" (video)
- "I Can't Dance" (video)
- "Hold on My Heart" (video)
- "Jesus He Knows Me" (video)

The DVD was reissued in November 2009 with a new 5.1 mix by Nick Davis as part of the Genesis Movie Box 1981–2007 DVD set. The new version reduced to a single DVD and did not include the multi-angle feature or the extras.

== Notes ==
- The versions of "Old Medley" on The Longs and on the video can be distinguished by the song titles Phil Collins intones during "I Know What I Like"; "Your Own Special Way" on the former and "Misunderstanding" on the latter.
- Unlike the previous two tours, "Turn It On Again" was performed in its original form, except for a brief crowd appreciation for the musicians on stage.
- During "Turn It On Again" Collins humorously references "All I Need Is a Miracle" and "Silent Running" during his introduction of Mike Rutherford. This was a substantial hit for his band Mike + the Mechanics in 1985.
- An instrumental version of "Way of the World" is used over the end credits.
- The remixed version of "I Can't Dance" used at the beginning of the DVD made by Howard and Trevor Gray, also appeared on the "I Can't Dance" single in 1991 and later on the 2000 compilation Genesis Archive No.2 1976–1992.

== Band ==
- Tony Banks – keyboards, background vocals
- Mike Rutherford – guitars, bass, background vocals
- Phil Collins – lead vocals, drums, percussion
- Daryl Stuermer – guitar, bass, background vocals
- Chester Thompson – drums, percussion
