= The Way We Walk, Volume Two: The Longs =

Live album by Genesis
- Released: 11 January 1993
- Recorded: 10 and 13 July 1992
- Genre: Progressive rock
- Length: 70:25
- Labels: Virgin, Atlantic
- Producers: Nick Davis, Robert Colby and Genesis

Genesis chronology
The Way We Walk, Volume One: The Shorts (1992)	The Way We Walk, Volume Two: The Longs (1993)	Calling All Stations (1997)

Professional ratings
Review scores
Source	Rating
AllMusic	3/5 stars
Entertainment Weekly	D
The Rolling Stone Album Guide	2.5/5 stars
Select	2/5 medals

Live – The Way We Walk, Volume Two: The Longs is the fifth live album by British band Genesis and was released on 11 January 1993, having been recorded during their 1992 tour for We Can't Dance.

While its companion piece, the preceding The Way We Walk, Volume One: The Shorts consisted of the band's pop hits from 1983 to then-present, The Way We Walk, Volume Two: The Longs focused on the longer songs performed during this period. For the 1992 tour, Genesis performed a "new" medley of their old songs—"Dance on a Volcano/The Lamb Lies Down on Broadway/The Musical Box/Firth of Fifth/I Know What I Like (In Your Wardrobe)"—which replaced the "In the Cage" medley. The "Old Medley" appeared on both this album and (in a very slightly different version) on the DVD of the Earls Court concert. The DVD version of "Old Medley" contains a very small snippet of "Misunderstanding" in place of the CD version's brief snippet of "Your Own Special Way".

The Way We Walk, Volume Two: The Longs reached No. 1 in the UK where it remained in the charts for 9 weeks, and No. 20 in the U.S. It remains the band's last No. 1 album.

== Track listing ==
No.	Title	Recording date and location	Length
1.	"Old Medley": "Dance on a Volcano"; "The Lamb Lies Down on Broadway"; "The Musical Box"; "Firth of Fifth"; "I Know What I Like (In Your Wardrobe) (Note: Also contains snippets of "That's All", "Illegal Alien", "Your Own Special Way", "Follow You Follow Me", and "Stagnation")"	10 July 1992 at Niedersachsenstadion, Hannover, Germany	19:32
2.	"Driving the Last Spike"	13 July 1992 at Niedersachsenstadion, Hannover, Germany	10:18
3.	"Domino": Part I—"In the Glow of the Night"; Part II—"The Last Domino"	10 July 1992	11:21
4.	"Fading Lights"	13 July 1992	10:55
5.	"Home by the Sea"/"Second Home by the Sea"	10 July 1992	12:14
6.	"Drum Duet"	10 July 1992	6:06

Note: "Drum Duet" was not included on the vinyl release.

== Personnel ==
Genesis

- Phil Collins – lead vocals, drums, percussion
- Tony Banks – keyboards, backing vocals
- Mike Rutherford – lead, rhythm & 12 string guitars, bass, bass pedals, backing vocals

Additional musicians

- Daryl Stuermer – lead guitar, bass, bass pedals, backing vocals
- Chester Thompson – drums, percussion

== Charts ==
=== Weekly charts ===
Weekly chart performance for The Way We Walk, Volume Two: The Longs
Chart (1993)	Peak position
Australian Albums (ARIA)	32
Austrian Albums (Ö3 Austria)	12
Canada Top Albums/CDs (RPM)	23
Dutch Albums (Album Top 100)	5
European Albums (European Top 100 Albums)	2
German Albums (Offizielle Top 100)	2
Japanese Albums (Oricon)	62
New Zealand Albums (RMNZ)	14
Norwegian Albums (VG-lista)	17
Portuguese Albums (AFP)	1
Swedish Albums (Sverigetopplistan)	33
Swiss Albums (Schweizer Hitparade)	3
UK Albums (Official Charts)	1
US Billboard 200	20

=== Year-end charts ===
1993 year-end chart performance for The Way We Walk, Volume Two: The Longs
Chart (1993)	Position
European Albums (European Top 100 Albums)	21
German Albums (Offizielle Top 100)	34
Swiss Albums (Schweizer Hitparade)	33
UK Albums (OCC)	64

== Certifications ==
Region	Certification	Certified units/sales
Argentina (CAPIF)	Gold	30,000^{^}
France (SNEP)	Gold	100,000^{*}
Spain (Promusicae)	Platinum	100,000^{^}
United Kingdom (BPI)	Gold	100,000^{^}
^{*} Sales figures based on certification alone.^{^} Shipments figures based on certification alone.
