= List of Genesis medleys =

The following is a list of Genesis medleys performed through the years of the band's career after Peter Gabriel's departure in 1975. Performers include Phil Collins, Tony Banks, Mike Rutherford, Steve Hackett, Bill Bruford, Chester Thompson, Daryl Stuermer, Ray Wilson, Nir Zidkyahu, and Anthony Drennan.

== List of Medleys ==
=== 1976 ===
- Lamb Stew/Casserole/Cutlet: "The Lamb Lies Down on Broadway" – "Fly on a Windshield (Instrumental)" – "Broadway Melody of 1974 (Instrumental)" – "The Carpet Crawlers" (1976)
- "it." – "Watcher of the Skies" (1976)
- "I Know What I Like (In Your Wardrobe)" – "Stagnation (Teaser)" – "I Know What I Like (In Your Wardrobe) (Reprise)" (1976–2022; not played on every tour, sometimes sliced into larger medleys such as "Old Medley" (see below))

=== 1977 ===
- "Lilywhite Lilith" – "The Waiting Room" – "Wot Gorilla?" – only played on one concert (01.01.1977, The Rainbow Theatre, London)
- "The Lamb Lies Down on Broadway" – "The Musical Box (Closing section)" (1977–1978)
- "I Know What I Like (In Your Wardrobe)" – "Dancing with the Moonlit Knight (Teaser)" - "Blood on the Rooftops (Teaser)" - "Visions of Angels (Teaser)" - "Stagnation (Teaser)" – "I Know What I Like (In Your Wardrobe) (Reprise)"

=== 1978 ===
- "The Cinema Show" – "...In That Quiet Earth" – "Afterglow" (1978)
- "Dancing with the Moonlit Knight" – "The Musical Box (Closing section) – only played on two concerts (13.10.1978, and 14.10.1978, Uptown Theatre, Chicago, Illinois)

=== 1980 ===
- "Dancing with the Moonlit Knight" – "The Carpet Crawlers" (1980, 1982 (Six of the Best) and 2021-2022 (The Last Domino? Tour))
- (Duke's "Hidden Suite") – "Behind the Lines" – "Duchess" – "Guide Vocal" – "Turn It On Again" – "Duke's Travels" – "Duke's End" (1980)
- "In the Cage" – "The Colony of Slippermen (c) Raven" – "Afterglow" (1980)

=== 1981–1982 ===
- "Behind the Lines" – "Duchess" – "The Lamb Lies Down on Broadway" (1981)
- "In the Cage" – "The Cinema Show" – "Riding the Scree (Teaser)" – "The Cinema Show (Reprise)" – "The Colony of Slippermen (c) Raven" – "Afterglow" (1981–1982)
- "The Lamb Lies Down on Broadway" – "Watcher of the Skies" (1982)
- "Dance on a Volcano" – "Behind the Lines" – Follow You Follow Me (1982)
- "Fly on a Windshield" – "Broadway Melody of 1974" – "In the Cage" (1982)

=== 1983–1984 ===
- "Turn It On Again" – "Everybody Needs Somebody to Love" – "(I Can't Get No) Satisfaction" – "The Last Time" – "All Day and All of the Night" – "In the Midnight Hour" – "Turn It On Again (Reprise)" (1983)
- "Turn It On Again" – "Everybody Needs Somebody to Love" – "(I Can't Get No) Satisfaction" – "Twist and Shout" – "All Day and All of the Night" – "Baby Let Me Take You Home" – "Karma Chameleon" – "Every Breath You Take" – "Pinball Wizard" – "In the Midnight Hour" – "Turn It On Again (Reprise)" (February 26th - 29th, 1984)
- "In the Cage" – "The Cinema Show" –"Riding the Scree" "...In That Quiet Earth" – "The Colony of Slippermen (c) Raven" – "Afterglow" (1983–1984)
- Old Medley: "Eleventh Earl of Mar" – "Ripples" – "Squonk" – "Firth of Fifth" (November 8th - 10th, 1983)
- Old Medley: "Eleventh Earl of Mar" – "Squonk" – "Firth of Fifth" (November 11th, 1983 - January 13th, 1984)
- Old Medley: "Eleventh Earl of Mar" – "Behind the Lines" – "Firth of Fifth" – "The Musical Box (Closing section)" (January 14th - 21st, 1984)
- Old Medley: "Eleventh Earl of Mar" – "The Lamb Lies Down on Broadway" – "Firth of Fifth" – "The Musical Box (Closing section)" (January 29th, 1984 - February 29th, 1984)

=== 1986–1990 ===
- "In the Cage" – "...In That Quiet Earth" – "Apocalypse in 9/8 (Co-Starring the Delicious Talents of Gabble Ratchet)" – "As Sure As Eggs Is Eggs (Aching Men's Feet)" (1986)
- "Turn It On Again" – "Everybody Needs Somebody to Love" – "(I Can't Get No) Satisfaction" – "Twist and Shout" – "All Day and All of the Night" – "You've Lost That Lovin' Feelin'" – "Pinball Wizard" – "In the Midnight Hour" – "Turn It On Again (Reprise)" (1986)
- "Turn It On Again" – "Everybody Needs Somebody to Love" – "(I Can't Get No) Satisfaction" – "Twist and Shout" – "Reach Out (I'll Be There)" – "You've Lost That Lovin' Feelin'" – "Pinball Wizard" – "In the Midnight Hour" – "Turn It On Again (Reprise)" (1986–1987,1990)
- "In the Cage" – "...In That Quiet Earth" – "Afterglow" (1987)
- "Turn It On Again" – "Land of Confusion" – "Misunderstanding" – "Throwing It All Away" – "You Can't Hurry Love" – "Shortcut to Somewhere" – "All I Need Is a Miracle" – "That's All" – "Tonight, Tonight, Tonight" – "Invisible Touch" – "Turn It On Again (Reprise)" (1988)

=== 1992 ===
- Old Medley #1: "Dance on a Volcano" – "The Lamb Lies Down on Broadway" – "The Musical Box" – "Firth of Fifth" – "I Know What I Like (In Your Wardrobe)" – "That's All (Teaser)" – "Illegal Alien (Teaser)" – "Your Own Special Way (Teaser)" – "Follow You Follow Me (Teaser)" – "Stagnation (Teaser)" – "I Know What I Like (In Your Wardrobe) (Reprise)" (1992) (from The Way We Walk, Volume Two: The Longs)
- Old Medley #2: "Dance on a Volcano" – "The Lamb Lies Down on Broadway" – "The Musical Box" – "Firth of Fifth" – "I Know What I Like (In Your Wardrobe)" – "That's All (Teaser)" – "Illegal Alien (Teaser)" – "Misunderstanding (Teaser)" – "Follow You Follow Me (Teaser)" – "Stagnation (teaser)" – "I Know What I Like (In Your Wardrobe) (Reprise)" (1992) (from The Way We Walk – Live in Concert DVD)

=== 1998 ===
- Acoustic Medley or Campfire Music: "Dancing With the Moonlit Knight (Intro)" – "Follow You Follow Me" – "Lover's Leap" (1998)

=== 2007 ===
- Duke's Intro: "Behind the Lines" – "Duke's End" (2007)
- "In the Cage" – "The Cinema Show (Instrumental section)" – "Riding The Scree (Teaser)" – "Duke's Travels (teaser)" – "Afterglow" (2007)
- "Firth of Fifth" – "I Know What I Like (In Your Wardrobe)" – "Stagnation (Teaser)" (2007)

=== 2021–2022 ===
- Duke's Intro: "Behind the Lines" – "Duke's End" (2021–2022)
- "Fading Lights (First two verses)" – "The Cinema Show (Instrumental section)" – "Riding The Scree (Teaser)" – "...In That Quiet Earth (Teaser)" – "Afterglow" (2021–2022)
- "Firth of Fifth (Instrumental section)" – "I Know What I Like (In Your Wardrobe)" – "Stagnation (Teaser)" (2021–2022)

== Notes ==
The versions of "Old Medley" on The Way We Walk, Volume Two: The Longs and on the video can be distinguished by the song titles Phil Collins intones during "I Know What I Like (In Your Wardrobe)"; "Your Own Special Way" on The Way We Walk, Volume Two: The Longs and "Misunderstanding" on The Way We Walk – Live in Concert DVD, but aside from this one line they are identical.
