= When in Rome 2007 =

Video by Genesis
- Released: 23 May 2008
- Recorded: 14 July 2007
- Venue: Circus Maximus (Rome)
- Genres: Pop rock, progressive rock
- Length: Concert: 157 min Bonus Material: 185 min.
- Label: Virgin
- Producer: Dione Orrom

Genesis chronology
The Video Show (2004)	When in Rome 2007 (2008)	Sum of the Parts (2014)

When in Rome 2007 is a live DVD by British rock band Genesis recorded at Circus Maximus, Rome, Italy, on 14 July 2007, during the Turn It On Again Tour. The concert was directed by David Mallet. The collection was released on 26 May 2008 in most of the world and 10 June 2008 in North America. During its initial release in the United States, it was available exclusively via the band's website, or through Walmart and Sam's Club retail and online stores. Since November 2009, it has been available in regular outlets and online stores in the United States.

A hi-definition release on Blu-ray and HD DVD was announced initially on the release of the corresponding CD Live over Europe 2007. An HD DVD release did not happen due to the demise of the format, and the record company decided there was not a sufficient market for a Blu-ray release.

The DVD was not included in the Genesis Movie Box 1981–2007 due to Nick Davis convincing the record company that fans were displeased with the prospect of buying When in Rome 2007 twice. Therefore, the box set contains an empty jewel case into which two of the three DVDs from When in Rome 2007 can be inserted to complete the box, the third DVD (the Come Rain or Shine documentary) can be housed in an empty slot in the bonus wallet.

The DVD includes a 28-page booklet. Audio options are DTS (24bit/96k) 5.1 surround sound, Dolby Digital (24bit/48k) 5.1 surround sound & Dolby Digital (24bit/48k) 2.0 stereo.

The estimated attendance for the concert was 500,000.

== Track listing ==
=== DVD 1 ===
1	When in Rome, Part 1	1:19:22	
	Duke's Intro: "Behind the Lines/Duke's End"		
	"Turn It On Again"		
	"No Son of Mine"		
	"Land of Confusion"		
	"In the Cage"		
	"The Cinema Show" [excerpt]		
	"Duke's Travels" [excerpt]		
	"Afterglow"		
	"Hold on My Heart"		
	"Home by the Sea"		
	"Second Home by the Sea"		
	"Follow You Follow Me"		
	"Firth of Fifth" [excerpt]		
	"I Know What I Like"		
2	Tour Programme		Gallery
3	Concert Extras		
	How Does "Duke's End" End?	3:23	
	We're Gonna Take It Up a Little Bit	2:45	
	Plugged In. Turned On. On the Edge	1:33	
	Minimal Confusion	2:19	
	Tony Changed His Mind	2:30	
	We Need More Lights	2:26	
	Counting the Bars to 'Heart'	4:34	
	Working On 'Home'	1:49	
	Mike Wants Phil's 'Feel' On Drums	5:15	
	From 'G' to 'G' on 'Firth'	3:38	
	Time to Dance	3:46	
	Total	1:53:20	

=== DVD 2 ===
1	When in Rome, Part 2	1:17:49	
	"Mama"		
	"Ripples..."		
	"Throwing It All Away"		
	"Domino"		
	"Conversations With 2 Stools"		
	"Los Endos"		
	"Tonight Tonight Tonight"		
	"Invisible Touch"		
	"I Can't Dance"		
	"Carpet Crawlers"		
	"Fading Lights" (studio recording - played during closing credits)		
2	Photo Gallery		Gallery
3	Concert Extras		
	Bring the Pitch Down Like Elton	7:34	
	Acoustic 'Ripples'	4:46	
	'Throwing It All' Down	2:09	
	Tony Talks About His Inspiration	2:12	
	The Drum Duet	8:58	
	Not a Period Piece	3:21	
	Invisible Key	2:37	
	Phil, Tony & Mike, and Phil & Mike?	2:39	
	Singing Along	4:23	
4	Deleted Scenes: Did You Do Your Homework?	2:12	
	Total	1:58:40	

=== DVD 3 ===
1	Come Rain or Shine	1:50:18	Tour documentary

== Credits ==
- Phil Collins – lead vocals, drums, percussion, stool
- Mike Rutherford – 6 and 12-string guitars, bass, bass pedals, backing vocals
- Tony Banks – keyboards, backing vocals

with

- Daryl Stuermer – guitars, bass, bass pedals, backing vocals
- Chester Thompson – drums, percussion, stool

== Charts ==
=== Weekly charts ===
Chart performance for When in Rome 2007
Chart (2008)	Peak position
Austrian Music DVD (Ö3 Austria)	1
Belgian Music DVD (Ultratop Flanders)	1
Belgian Music DVD (Ultratop Wallonia)	1
Danish Music DVD (Hitlisten)	2
Dutch Music DVD (MegaCharts)	1
French Music DVD (SNEP)	17
Hungarian Music DVD (MAHASZ)	13
Irish Music DVD (IRMA)	8
Italian Music DVD (FIMI)	1
Portuguese Music DVD (AFP)	9
Spanish Music DVD (Promusicae)	9
Swedish Music DVD (Sverigetopplistan)	1
Swiss Music DVD (Schweizer Hitparade)	1
US Music Videos (Billboard)	2

== Certifications and sales ==
Certifications and sales for When in Rome 2007
Region	Certification	Certified units/sales
Argentina (CAPIF)	Platinum	8,000^{^}
France (SNEP)	Platinum	20,867
Germany (BVMI)	Platinum	50,000^{^}
Italy	—	15,000
United Kingdom (BPI)	Platinum	50,000^{^}
^{^} Shipments figures based on certification alone.

== Release history ==
Country	Date
Germany	23 May 2008
Netherlands	23 May 2008
United Kingdom	10 June 2008
United States	10 June 2008
