= Billboard Top Hits: 1992 =

Compilation album by various artists
- Released: April 25, 2000
- Recorded: 1992
- Genres: Pop; rock
- Length: 38:32
- Label: Rhino

Billboard Top Hits chronology
Billboard Top Hits: 1991 (2000)	Billboard Top Hits: 1992 (2000)	Billboard Top Hits: 1993 (2000)

Professional ratings
Review scores
Source	Rating
AllMusic	3/5 stars

Billboard Top Hits: 1992 is a compilation album released by Rhino Records in 2000, featuring ten hit recordings from 1992.

The track lineup includes five songs that reached the top of the Billboard Hot 100 chart. The remaining songs all reached the top ten of the Hot 100.

== Track listing ==
No.	Title	Writer(s)	Artist	Length
1.	"Just Another Day"	Jon Secada; Miguel A. Morejon	Jon Secada	4:21
2.	"To Be With You"	Eric Martin; David Grahame	Mister Big	3:27
3.	"Live and Learn"	Dwight Wyatt; Jake Carter; Joe Sayles; Kevin Scott; Nathan Sayles	Joe Public	3:54
4.	"I Can't Dance"	Tony Banks; Phil Collins; Mike Rutherford	Genesis	3:59
5.	"Baby Got Back"	Anthony Ray	Sir Mix-a-Lot	4:23
6.	"How Do You Talk to an Angel" (lead vocals by Jamie Walters)	Steve Tyrell; Barry Coffing; Stephanie Tyrell	The Heights	3:45
7.	"Jump"	Jermaine Dupri; Berry Gordy; Freddie Perren; Alphonzo Mizell; Deke Richards; Leroy "Sugarfoot" Bonner; Marshall Jones; Ralph Middlebrooks; Walter Morrison; Norman Napier; Andrew Noland; Marvin Pierce; Gregory Webster; Roy Hammond	Kris Kross	3:16
8.	"Masterpiece"	Kenny Nolan	Atlantic Starr	4:19
9.	"Tell Me What You Want Me to Do"	Narada Michael Walden; Tevin Campbell; Sally Jo Dakota	Tevin Campbell	4:17
10.	"I'm Too Sexy"	Fred Fairbrass; Richard Fairbrass; Rob Manzoli	Right Said Fred	2:51
Total length:				38:32

- Track information and credits were taken from the album's liner notes.
