= Billboard Top Hits: 1995 =

Compilation album by various artists
- Released: August 15, 2000
- Recorded: 1995
- Genres: Pop; rock
- Length: 39:10
- Label: Rhino

Billboard Top Hits chronology
Billboard Top Hits: 1994 (2000)	Billboard Top Hits: 1995 (2000)

Professional ratings
Review scores
Source	Rating
AllMusic	3/5 stars

Billboard Top Hits: 1995 is a compilation album released by Rhino Records in 2000, featuring ten hit recordings from 1995.

No songs that reached No. 1 on the Billboard Hot 100 are included in this collection. The highest-charting song from that chart to appear on this album is "Run Away" by Real McCoy, which peaked at No. 3. Each song did peak in the top five of a Billboard chart, such as the dance, adult contemporary and R&B charts.

== Track listing ==
No.	Title	Writer(s)	Artist	Length
1.	"I Know"	Milton Davis; William DuVall	Dionne Farris	3:47
2.	"The Rhythm of the Night"	Francesco Bontempi; Annerley Emma Gordon; Giorgio Spagna; Pete Glenister; Michael Gaffey	Corona	4:11
3.	"I Believe"	Eliot Sloan	Blessid Union of Souls	4:39
4.	"I Got 5 on It"	Anthony Gillmour; Claydes Smith; Dennis Thomas; Denzil Foster; Donald Boyce; Garrick Husbands; George Brown; Jay King; Jerold Ellis; Rick Westfield; Robert Bell; Robert Mickens; Ronald Bell; Thomas McElroy	Luniz	4:07
5.	"Only Wanna Be With You"	Mark Bryan; Bob Dylan; Dean Felber; Darius Rucker; Jim Sonefeld	Hootie & the Blowfish	3:47
6.	"Run Away"	Juergen Wind; Frank Hassas; Olaf Jeglitza	Real McCoy	4:05
7.	"You Remind Me of Something"	Robert Kelly	R. Kelly	4:11
8.	"I'll Be There for You"	Phil Solem; Danny Wilde; David Crane; Marta Kauffman; Michael Skloff; Allee Willis	The Rembrandts	3:09
9.	"Back for Good"	Gary Barlow	Take That	4:03
10.	"Cotton Eye Joe"	Traditional	Rednex	3:11
Total length:				39:10

Billboard Top Hits: 1996 does not exist

- Track information and credits were taken from the CD liner notes.
