= Billboard Top Hits: 1994 =

Compilation album by various artists
- Released: August 15, 2000
- Recorded: 1994
- Genres: Pop; rock
- Length: 39:38
- Label: Rhino

Billboard Top Hits chronology
Billboard Top Hits: 1993 (2000)	Billboard Top Hits: 1994 (2000)	Billboard Top Hits: 1995 (2000)

Professional ratings
Review scores
Source	Rating
AllMusic	3/5 stars

Billboard Top Hits: 1994 is a compilation album released by Rhino Records in 2000, featuring ten hit recordings from 1994.

The track lineup includes three songs that reached the top of the Billboard Hot 100 chart, including the No. 1 song of 1994, "The Sign" by Ace of Base. The remaining songs all reached the top ten of the Hot 100.

== Track listing ==
No.	Title	Writer(s)	Artist	Length
1.	"Here Comes the Hotstepper"	Ini Kamoze; Chris Kenner; Kenton Nix; Salaam Remi	Ini Kamoze	4:10
2.	"Baby, I Love Your Way"	Peter Frampton	Big Mountain	4:35
3.	"Can We Talk"	Kenneth Brian Edmonds; Daryl Simmons	Tevin Campbell	4:21
4.	"The Sign"	Jonas Berggren	Ace of Base	3:08
5.	"Bump N' Grind"	Robert Kelly	R. Kelly	4:16
6.	"Now and Forever"	Richard Marx	Richard Marx	3:35
7.	"Regulate"	Nathaniel Dwayne Hale; Warren Griffin III	Warren G	4:11
8.	"Mmm Mmm Mmm Mmm"	Brad Roberts	Crash Test Dummies	3:54
9.	"If You Go"	Jon Secada; Miguel Morejon	Jon Secada	3:47
10.	"Cantaloop (Flip Fantasia)"	Herbie Hancock; Rahsaan Kelly; Geoff Wilkinson; Mel Simpson	Us3	3:41
Total length:				39:38

- Track information and credits were taken from the album's liner notes.
