= Billboard Top Hits: 1993 =

Compilation album by various artists
- Released: April 25, 2000
- Recorded: 1993
- Genres: Pop; rock
- Length: 41:28
- Label: Rhino

Billboard Top Hits chronology
Billboard Top Hits: 1992 (2000)	Billboard Top Hits: 1993 (2000)	Billboard Top Hits: 1994 (2000)

Professional ratings
Review scores
Source	Rating
AllMusic	3/5 stars

Billboard Top Hits: 1993 is a compilation album released by Rhino Records in 2000, featuring ten hit recordings from 1993.

The track lineup includes one song that reached the top of the Billboard Hot 100 chart — "Informer" by Snow. The remaining songs all reached the top ten of the Hot 100.

== Track listing ==
No.	Title	Writer(s)	Artist	Length
1.	"Rhythm Is a Dancer"	Michael Münzing; Luca Anzilotti; Thea Austin	Snap!	3:53
2.	"I'm Gonna Be (500 Miles)"	Charlie Reid; Craig Reid	Proclaimers	3:37
3.	"Bad Boys (Theme from 'Cops')"	Ian Lewis	Inner Circle	3:49
4.	"Ditty"	Mitchell Johnson; Aaron Clark; Dave Ferguson; John Ferguson; Roger Troutman; Larry Troutman	Paperboy	4:02
5.	"All That She Wants"	Jonas Berggren; Ulf Ekberg	Ace of Base	3:31
6.	"Mr. Wendal"	Todd Thomas; Sylvester Stewart	Arrested Development	4:09
7.	"Ordinary World"	Simon Le Bon; John Taylor; James Bates; Warren Cuccurullo	Duran Duran	5:41
8.	"Informer"	Edmond Leary; Darrin O'Brien; Shawn Moltke; Terri Moltke; Jeffrey Silva	Snow	4:05
9.	"Show Me Love"	Allan George; Fred McFarlane	Robin S.	4:13
10.	"Whoomp! (There It Is)"	Stephen Gibson; Cecil Glenn	Tag Team	4:28
Total length:				41:28

- Track information and credits were taken from the CD liner notes.
