= Never a Time =

1992 single by Genesis

Single by Genesis

from the album We Can't Dance
- Released: 19 October 1992
- Length: 3:53
- Label: Atlantic; Virgin
- Songwriters: Tony Banks; Phil Collins; Mike Rutherford
- Producers: Nick Davis; Genesis

Genesis singles chronology
"Jesus He Knows Me" (1992)	"Never a Time" (1992)	"Tell Me Why" (1992)

"Never a Time" is the fifth track from English rock band Genesis's 14th studio album, We Can't Dance (1991). This song, a ballad, was released as the fifth single from the album, and peaked at No. 4 on the US Billboard Hot Adult Contemporary Tracks chart, No. 21 on the Billboard Hot 100, and No. 9 in Canada.

Despite charting in several countries, this song has never been included on any Genesis compilation.

== Personnel ==
- Tony Banks – keyboards
- Phil Collins – vocals, drums, percussion
- Mike Rutherford – electric guitars, bass guitar

== Charts ==
=== Weekly charts ===
Chart (1992–1993)	Peak position
Canada Top Singles (RPM)	9
Canada Adult Contemporary (RPM)	5
Germany (GfK)	56
US Billboard Hot 100	21
US Adult Contemporary (Billboard)	4
US Pop Airplay (Billboard)	12
US Cash Box Top 100	19

=== Year-end charts ===
Chart (1993)	Position
Canada Top Singles (RPM)	70
Canada Adult Contemporary (RPM)	30
US Adult Contemporary (Billboard)	19

== Release history ==
Region	Date	Format(s)	Label(s)	Ref.
United States	19 October 1992	—N/a	Atlantic	
Japan	28 December 1992	CD	Virgin	
