= Genesis Archive 2: 1976–1992 =

Genesis Archive #2: 1976–1992

Box set by Genesis
- Released: 6 November 2000
- Recorded: 1975–1992
- Genres: Progressive rock; pop rock; art rock
- Length: 206:18
- Labels: Virgin (UK); Atlantic (US)
- Producers: Genesis; Hugh Padgham; David Hentschel; Nick Davis

Genesis chronology
Turn It on Again: The Hits (1999)	Genesis Archive #2: 1976–1992 (2000)	Platinum Collection (2004)

Genesis Archive #2: 1976–1992 is the second box set by English rock band Genesis. It was released on 6 November 2000 on Virgin and Atlantic Records as the follow-up to their previous retrospective box set, Genesis Archive 1967–75 (1998). This set covers the band's history post 1975, when drummer Phil Collins replaced original lead singer Peter Gabriel.

== Contents ==
The three discs consist of live recordings (mostly previously unreleased, with a few that had been B-sides), 12" remixes, a "work-in-progress" jam, non-album B-sides, and tracks from the Spot the Pigeon and 3×3 EPs. There was minor backlash from fans as "Match of the Day" and "Me and Virgil" were left off the set (although both had been released on CD before) due to Tony Banks and Mike Rutherford disliking the former track, while Phil Collins disliked the latter one. However, the band later changed their minds about the songs, and they were re-released on the Genesis 1976–1982 box set. Additionally, "Submarine" and "It's Yourself", neither of which had been released on CD before, were both edited—the former due to damage to the master tape, and the latter due to the band's preference. "Submarine" was later re-released in its original unedited form on the Genesis 1976–1982 box set. Although the artwork features an outline of the ripples on the cover of Calling All Stations, no material from that album's sessions is included.

== Release ==
Professional ratings
Review scores
Source	Rating
AllMusic	2.5/5 stars
Entertainment Weekly	C
The Rolling Stone Album Guide	2/5 stars

Genesis Archive 2: 1976–1992 reached No. 103 in the UK.

== Track listing ==
All tracks written by Tony Banks, Phil Collins and Mike Rutherford, except where noted.

Disc one
No.	Title	Writer(s)	Source	Length
1.	"On the Shoreline"		B-side of "I Can't Dance", December 1991	4:47
2.	"Hearts on Fire"		B-side of "Jesus He Knows Me", July 1992	5:14
3.	"You Might Recall"		3×3 EP, 1982	5:30
4.	"Paperlate"		3×3 EP, 1982	3:20
5.	"Evidence of Autumn"	Tony Banks	B-side of "Misunderstanding", August 1980	4:58
6.	"Do the Neurotic"		B-side of "In Too Deep", August 1986	7:07
7.	"I'd Rather Be You"		B-side of "Throwing It All Away", July 1987	3:57
8.	"Naminanu"		B-side of "Keep It Dark", October 1981	3:52
9.	"Inside and Out"	Banks; Phil Collins; Steve Hackett; Mike Rutherford	Spot the Pigeon EP, May 1977	6:43
10.	"Feeding the Fire"		B-side of "Land of Confusion", November 1986	5:49
11.	"I Can't Dance" (12" remix (aka "Sex Mix")			7:00
12.	"Submarine" (New edited version)		B-side of "Man on the Corner", March 1982	5:13

Disc two
No.	Title	Writer(s)	Source	Length
1.	"Illegal Alien" (Live at the Forum, Los Angeles, on 14 January 1984)			5:31
2.	"Dreaming While You Sleep" (Live at Earls Court Exhibition Centre, London, in November 1992)		B-side of "Tell Me Why", 1992	7:48
3.	"It's Gonna Get Better" (Live at the Forum, Los Angeles, on 14 January 1984)			7:31
4.	"Deep in the Motherlode" (Live at Theatre Royal, Drury Lane, London, on 5 May 1980)	Mike Rutherford		5:54
5.	"Ripples" (Live at the Lyceum Theatre, London, on 7 May 1980)	Banks; Rutherford		9:54
6.	"The Brazilian" (Live at Wembley Stadium, London, on 3 July 1987)		B-side of "Invisible Touch (Live)", 1992	5:18
7.	"Your Own Special Way" (Live at the Sydney Entertainment Centre in December 1986)	Rutherford	B-side of "Hold on My Heart", 1991	6:51
8.	"Burning Rope" (Live at the Hofheinz Pavilion, Houston, on 22 October 1978)	Banks		7:29
9.	"Entangled" (Live at Bingley Hall, Staffordshire, on 10 July 1976)	Banks; Hackett		6:57
10.	"Duke's Travels/Duke's End" (Live at the Lyceum Theatre, London, on 7 May 1980)			9:32

Disc three
No.	Title	Writer(s)	Source	Length
1.	"Invisible Touch" (12" remix)			5:58
2.	"Land of Confusion" (12" remix)			6:59
3.	"Tonight, Tonight, Tonight" (12" remix)			11:46
4.	"No Reply at All" (live at the Savoy Theatre, New York City, on 28 November 1981)			4:56
5.	"Man on the Corner" (live at the Savoy Theatre, New York City, on 28 November 1981)	Collins		4:04
6.	"The Lady Lies" (live at the Lyceum Theatre, London, on 7 May 1980)	Banks		6:07
7.	"Open Door"	Rutherford	b-side of "Duchess", May 1980	4:08
8.	"The Day the Light Went Out"	Banks	double b-side of "Many Too Many", June 1978	3:12
9.	"Vancouver"	Collins; Rutherford	double b-side of "Many Too Many", June 1978	3:01
10.	"Pigeons"		Spot the Pigeon EP, May 1977	3:12
11.	"It's Yourself" (new edited version)	Banks; Collins; Hackett; Rutherford	b-side of "Your Own Special Way", February 1977	5:26
12.	"Mama" (work in progress)		early demo version recorded in 1983 during the Genesis sessions	10:43

== Personnel ==
- Tony Banks - keyboards, background vocals
- Phil Collins - drums, percussion, vocals
- Mike Rutherford - guitars, bass, background vocals
- Steve Hackett - guitars on Disc 1, Track 9; Disc 2, Track 9; and Disc 3; Tracks 10 and 11

Additional personnel

- Daryl Stuermer - bass, guitar on Disc 2 (except "Entangled") and on Disc 3, Tracks 4, 5 and 6
- Chester Thompson - percussion, drums on Disc 2 (except "Entangled") and on Disc 3, Tracks 4, 5 and 6
- Bill Bruford - percussion on Disc 2, Track 9
- Peter Robinson - string arrangement on Disc 2, Track 7
