= Tell Me Why (Genesis song) =

1992 single by Genesis

Single by Genesis

from the album We Can't Dance
- B-side: "Dreaming While You Sleep" (live); "Turn It On Again" (live)"; "Tonight, Tonight, Tonight" (live); "Invisible Touch" (live)
- Released: 1992
- Length: 5:00
- Label: Virgin
- Songwriters: Tony Banks; Phil Collins; Mike Rutherford
- Producers: Genesis; Nick Davis

Genesis singles chronology
"Never a Time" (1992)	"Tell Me Why" (1992)	"Invisible Touch" (live) (1992)

Music video
- "Tell Me Why" on YouTube

"Tell Me Why" is a song by English rock band Genesis, appearing as the seventh track on their 14th studio album, We Can't Dance (1991). It was issued as a single in Europe and Australia in 1992 and was released in the United Kingdom early the following year. It was the last Genesis single featuring Phil Collins on vocals before leaving the group in March 1996.

== Background ==
A royalty from the single was donated to the Bosnian Save the Children and Red Cross charities. This was in keeping with the lyric of the song, which expressed disdain for hypocrisy about food and shelter ("You say there's nothing you can do / Is there one rule for them and one for you?").

Reflecting the emerging trend for CD singles, "Tell Me Why" was issued as two separate discs in the UK. Both editions came in digipaks with identical artwork, and were backed by a live version of "Dreaming While You Sleep." The first CD featured a 1992 version of "Turn It On Again" as an exclusive track, while the second included a full performance of "Tonight, Tonight, Tonight" from the 1987 Invisible Touch tour.

In Europe the live B-sides were "Mama", "The Brazilian" (both from the Invisible Touch tour) and the single version of "Invisible Touch."

Unlike its four predecessors, the single was not a commercial success, barely breaching the UK Top 40.

The working title of "Tell Me Why" was originally "Rickenbacker" after the 12-string Rickenbacker guitar used by Mike Rutherford on the song. Rickenbackers are known for their distinct "ringing" sound.

== Track listings ==
- CD single
1. "Tell Me Why" – 4:58
2. "Dreaming While You Sleep" (live) – 7:55
3. "Tonight, Tonight, Tonight" (full version live – Wembley, 3 July 1987) – 9:33
- 7-inch single
1. "Tell Me Why" – 4:58
2. "Invisible Touch" (live) – 5:18

== Personnel ==
- Tony Banks – keyboards
- Phil Collins – vocals, drums, percussion
- Mike Rutherford – 12-string guitar, electric guitar, bass guitar

== Charts ==
Chart (1992–1993)	Peak position
Australia (ARIA)	110
France (SNEP)	27
Germany (GfK)	51
Netherlands (Dutch Top 40)	36
Netherlands (Single Top 100)	37
UK Singles (OCC)	40
UK Airplay (Music Week)	32

== Release history ==
Region	Date	Format(s)	Label(s)	Ref.
Europe	1992	7-inch vinyl	Virgin	
Australia	30 November 1992	CD; cassette	Virgin	
United Kingdom	8 February 1993	7-inch vinyl; CD1; cassette	Virgin	
United Kingdom	15 February 1993	CD2	Virgin	
