= We Can't Dance =

Studio album by Genesis
- Released: 11 November 1991
- Recorded: March–September 1991
- Studios: The Farm, Chiddingfold, Surrey
- Length: 71:30
- Labels: Atlantic; Virgin
- Producers: Genesis; Nick Davis

Genesis chronology
Invisible Touch (1986)	We Can't Dance (1991)	The Way We Walk, Volume One: The Shorts (1992)

Singles from We Can't Dance
- 1. "No Son of Mine" Released: 21 October 1991; 2. "I Can't Dance" Released: 30 December 1991; 3. "Hold on My Heart" Released: 6 April 1992; 4. "Jesus He Knows Me" Released: 13 July 1992; 5. "Never a Time" Released: 19 October 1992; 6. "Tell Me Why" Released: 8 February 1993 (Note: Released in Europe in 1992.)

We Can't Dance is the fourteenth studio album by the English rock band Genesis, released on 11 November 1991 by Virgin Records in the UK and a day later by Atlantic Records in the US. It was the last Genesis album recorded with the drummer and singer Phil Collins before his departure in 1996 to pursue solo projects full time. It was Genesis's first album after touring their previous album, Invisible Touch (1986).

We Can't Dance was Genesis's fifth consecutive No. 1 album in the UK. It reached No. 4 in the US, where it sold over four million copies. Between 1991 and 1993, six tracks were released as singles, including "I Can't Dance", which was nominated for the Grammy Award for Best Pop Performance by a Duo or Group With Vocals in 1993. Genesis toured in support of We Can't Dance from May to November 1992, playing large stadiums and arenas across North America and Europe.

== Background ==
In July 1987, the Genesis line-up of drummer and singer Phil Collins, keyboardist Tony Banks, and bassist and guitarist Mike Rutherford wrapped their 1986–1987 world tour in support of their thirteenth studio album, Invisible Touch (1986). The 112-date tour, attended by an estimated 3.5 million people, was taxing, particularly for Rutherford following his father's death and almost losing his son Harry due to a difficult birth. The band entered a three-and-a-half-year period of inactivity, during which each member continued with solo projects. Collins achieved further worldwide success following the release of his solo album ...But Seriously (1989), while Rutherford's band, Mike and the Mechanics, also had hits. Banks and Rutherford expected Collins to leave the band, but he stayed on to record another Genesis studio album with them. The band had initially agreed to enter production in 1990, but it was pushed to 1991 because of Collins' lengthy solo tour. The album's title derived mostly from the popularity of dance music and its presence in the charts at the time.

== Recording ==
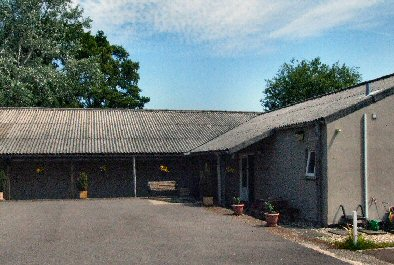
The Farm, where We Can't Dance was written and recorded

Genesis recorded We Can't Dance from March to September 1991 at their private recording studio named the Farm in Chiddingfold, Surrey. The trio were keen to work together after such an extensive break, and after two-and-a-half months of what Collins described as "chopping away, fine-tuning, and honing down all these ideas", they had completed some fifteen tracks. They originally considered releasing a double album, but realised most people would be listening to their work on CD which gave them the additional time they wanted to present more of their musical ideas. As with Genesis (1983) and Invisible Touch, none of the material on We Can't Dance was conceived beforehand, and the band instead developed songs through lengthy improvisational jams in the studio. This was a deciding factor for Collins to remain in the band despite his solo success as he enjoyed writing songs with his Genesis bandmates. A typical session would involve Banks and Rutherford playing chords, with Collins devising a drum pattern with a drum machine, which allowed him to sing notes and placeholder lyrics. The words he sang were used to form a lyric or help create atmosphere.

Genesis authorised the filming of some recording sessions for the first time for their No Admittance documentary, which aired on national television. Banks later admitted that the band avoided "any creative work" with the film crew present because they found it difficult, adding: "As soon as they were there, we shut off". Collins supported his view and pointed out a change in the atmosphere of working when someone from the filming crew entered the room.

In a departure from their previous albums, Rutherford avoided playing a guitar synthesiser and only plays a Fender Stratocaster and two Steinbergers, one of them a GM series model that was new for the time, but on the song "Tell Me Why", he is playing a Rickenbacker 12-string electric guitar. He had asked the manufacturer to customise one with a larger body to suit his tall frame but they declined, leaving him to use a cardboard cutout of a body he wished for and sending it to luthier Roger Giffin to make it. He played all his guitar parts with a Groove Tubes amplifier that was suggested to him by his roadie and technician Geoff Banks.

For recording, Genesis enlisted then 28-year-old Nick Davis as co-producer and engineer, who had previously worked with Banks and Rutherford on their solo projects, with the band also handling production. This marked the end of their association with Hugh Padgham, which had begun with Abacab (1981). Rutherford said the group decided to switch producers before work on the album had begun, and insisted they were pleased with Padgham's contributions, but felt it was the right time for a change after having done three albums with him (Padgham had also produced Collins's four solo albums throughout the 1980s). Davis was keen to feature Rutherford's guitar more prominently as an instrument than previous Genesis albums, and felt his approach was successful on some of the tracks on We Can't Dance. Banks took a liking to some of Davis's strong opinions towards certain aspects of recording and instruments which presented him the challenge of finding other ways of recording.

Following a six-week break during the summer of 1991 the band reconvened and completed the mixing in late September, selecting a final 12-track running order that spanned 71 minutes. Banks said that compared to the more direct nature of Invisible Touch, the style of We Can't Dance offered more of a sense of mystery with effort put into each track having its own "individual quality", yet have an atmosphere that runs through the entire album.

== Songs ==
In a similar way to the writing of Invisible Touch, the band initially allocated roughly one third of the album to each member, who was then responsible for the lyrics to their collection of songs. Banks said having one person work on a set of lyrics was a better way of carrying an idea through. In the end, We Can't Dance saw Collins contribute a greater amount of lyrics than before; his efforts praised by Rutherford who considered his words for its songs among his best in Genesis history. Collins went further and rated his lyrics on We Can't Dance as some of the best of his career and said, "Obviously, the music stimulated me". In a week during which Banks and Rutherford left the studio for promotional work, Collins started to write lyrical ideas; according to Rutherford "he just couldn't stop himself after that. He found he had dead time on his hands."

Several songs deal with serious matters and social issues. "No Son of Mine" tackles the subject of the domestic abuse of a 15-year-old boy, which originated with Collins repeating the phrase "no son of mine" as a dummy lyric during the writing sessions, rather than a song concerning social commentary. The ten-minute "Driving The Last Spike" is about 19th-century Irish navvies who helped built the railways in the UK, and the poor and unsafe working conditions they had to endure. Collins wrote it after being given a book on the subject by a correspondent who sought to produce a television show about it. Banks used a Hammond organ patch, which referenced his prominent use of the instrument early in Genesis' career. "Dreaming While You Sleep" concerns a hit-and-run driver and his guilt after failing to stop at the scene of the accident. The former contains a sample of a sound that Rutherford achieved as he was "messing about bending two notes" that Banks had recorded from a microphone on his E-mu Emulator which he then sampled and slowed down, creating a noise he compared to an elephant's trumpeting. "Tell Me Why" criticises the Gulf War and the plight of the Kurdish people in its aftermath. Collins got the idea from a television news report while he was having dinner with his wife and daughter. "So I just mixed my feelings with previous thoughts about Bangladesh and Ethiopia". Its original working title was "Rickenbacker" after the 12-string Rickenbacker guitar used by Rutherford on the song and known for their distinct "ringing" sound. "Since I Lost You" was written by Collins for his friend Eric Clapton, following the death of the guitarist's son Conor, on 20 March 1991. Banks and Rutherford were the only members in the studio that day, and played what music they had written to Collins the following day. Collins said, "Straight away, I was singing the things you hear on the record", and wrote a set of lyrics based on the incident, not revealing what they were about to his bandmates until he had finished them. Some lines were from a real-life conversation Collins had with Clapton following the incident. The other long track, "Fading Lights", came out of group improvisation.

The serious material was balanced by shorter and lighter songs. "Jesus He Knows Me" was a barbed parody of the televangelist movement in the US, which the band members had seen while touring. "I Can't Dance" was a criticism of models who appeared in jeans adverts popular at the time, and built around a heavy Rutherford guitar riff. Banks noted his electric piano part was one of the most minimal riffs he has played on record and had thought of a style heard on the 1968 song "Feelin' Alright?" by Traffic. "Living Forever" deals with a cynical view of society's obsession with modern diets and lifestyles. Its original working title was "Hip-Hop Brushes" after Collins acquired new drum disks for his E-mu SP-1200 drum machine and devised a hip-hop oriented drum pattern using its brush sound, as he recalled, in around ten minutes which the group then played from and developed the song from it. Two songs, "On the Shoreline" and "Hearts on Fire", were cut from the album due to time constraints; instead, both songs were released as B-sides for the singles "I Can't Dance" and "Jesus He Knows Me" respectively, as well as appearing in the Genesis Archive 2: 1976–1992 and Genesis 1983–1998 box sets. Among the keyboards Banks plays on the album are the Korg 01/W Music Workstation, Korg Wavestation, Ensoniq VFX, Roland JD-800, Roland Rhodes VK-1000, and E-mu Emulator III; the latter enabled Banks to create samples in stereo.

== Release ==
We Can't Dance was released worldwide on 11 November 1991 on Virgin Records and on 12 November 1991 by Atlantic Records in the United States. The album was a success in the charts, going to number one on the UK Albums Chart for two non-consecutive weeks beginning 23 November 1991 and 22 August 1992. In the United States, it debuted the Billboard 200 chart at number four, the week of 30 November 1991. It stayed at its peak for one week during its 72-week stay on the chart. The album also spawned several hit singles, including "No Son of Mine", "Hold on My Heart", "I Can't Dance" and "Jesus He Knows Me", the latter two supported by humorous videos.

On 1 December 1991, the album was certified double Platinum by the British Phonographic Industry (BPI) for shipment of 600,000 copies. A year later, sales grew to reach quadruple platinum, signifying 1.2 million copies sold. The album reached quintuple platinum status in March 1997, for 1.5 million copies sold. In the United States, We Can't Dance shipped 1 million copies by 27 December 1991. Five years later, the album was certified quadruple platinum by the Recording Industry Association of America (RIAA) for four million copies sold.

We Can't Dance was re-released in 2007 as a SACD/DVD set with new stereo and 5.1 surround sound mixes by Davis. It was also included as part of the band's Genesis 1983–1998 box set.

== Critical reception ==
Professional ratings
Review scores
Source	Rating
AllMusic	3/5 stars
The Baltimore Sun	(favourable)
Calgary Herald	C
Entertainment Weekly	C
NME	1/10
Rolling Stone	3/5 stars
The Rolling Stone Album Guide	4/5 stars
The Windsor Star	B+

Rolling Stone chiefly commented on the album's lyrics. They criticised "Tell Me Why" and "Way of the World" for being soulless and impersonal social commentaries, but regarded most of the songs as outstanding, and summarised "Although We Can't Dance doesn't quite achieve the vulnerable grace of Duke or the exuberance of Abacab, Genesis has nevertheless delivered an elegantly spare – and even adventurous – album." David Browne of Entertainment Weekly wrote: "At a time when everything is uncertain ... you almost have to admire a record like We Can't Dance. ... You know there will be a couple of fleeting moments when the band breaks out of its torpor – for instance, on the very polite primal stomp of 'I Can't Dance' – and that such moments will just as quickly be subsumed by the rest of the musical quicksand."

In a retrospective assessment, AllMusic criticised the lyrics of "Tell Me Why" and "Way of the World", calling them "paeans for world understanding that sound miles away from any immediacy". However, they praised the album for returning to a less pop-oriented direction, and especially complimented the grittiness of "No Son of Mine", "Jesus He Knows Me", and "I Can't Dance". Jim Allen of Ultimate Classic Rock ranked We Can't Dance as the 14th-best album by Genesis, stating "Collins' final album with Genesis is full of obnoxious, overproduced pop pap; most of the tracks sound like castoffs from one of his solo albums. When the meager charms of a song like 'I Can't Dance' are a highlight, you're in big trouble." Stevie Chick of The Guardian dismissed it as "blandness" in a 2014 countdown of ten of the best Genesis songs.

The album garnered Genesis an American Music Award for Favorite Pop/Rock Band, Duo, or Group and two further nominations for Favorite Adult Contemporary Album and Favorite Adult Contemporary Artist. At the Brit Awards in 1993, the album was nominated for British Album while Phil Collins was nominated as British Male Artist for his contribution to the album.

== Tour ==
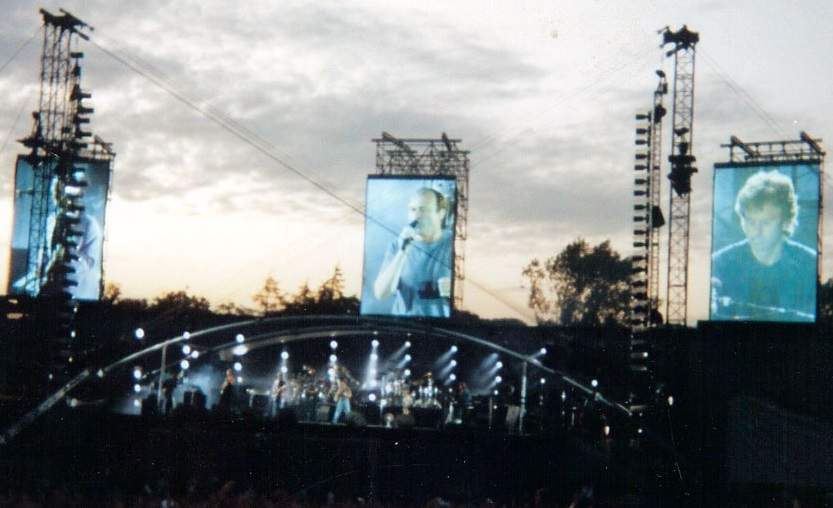
Genesis performing at the 1992 Knebworth Festival

Genesis supported the album with the 68-date We Can't Dance Tour across the United States and Europe from 8 May to 17 November 1992, with their longtime touring musicians Chester Thompson on drums and Daryl Stuermer on bass and lead guitars. It also marked the 25th anniversary of the band, and featured a 20-minute medley of their older material recorded in the 1970s. For the first time since 1978, the setlist did not include "In the Cage" from The Lamb Lies Down on Broadway (1974).

Booking agent Mike Farrell said Genesis spent millions of their own earnings to put the tour together. Designed specifically for stadiums, the set featured a 200 ft-long (60.9 m) stage designed by Marc Brickman and built to the band's specifications with 80 ft (24.3 m) sound towers and three 20 x 26 ft (6 x 7.9 m) moveable Sony Jumbotron screens that alone cost $5 million, all needing 42 lorries to transport. The advantages of these was that images from videos or artwork was projected on them to illustrate some songs, while live camera footage of the band gave everyone in the arena a front row view. Collins sang with an in-ear monitoring system which he credited to singing more in tune and more effortlessly than before as he felt he was always "fighting" with the band's sound. It also reduced his worry about the condition of his voice on tour. Collins would not tour with Genesis again until he returned in 2007 for their Turn It On Again: The Tour.

Recordings from several dates were released on the live albums The Way We Walk, Volume One: The Shorts (1992) and The Way We Walk, Volume Two: The Longs (1993). The dates at Earl's Court in London were filmed and released as The Way We Walk - Live in Concert.

== Track listing ==
All music written by Tony Banks, Phil Collins, and Mike Rutherford. Lyricists specified below.

Side one
No.	Title	Lyrics	Length
1.	"No Son of Mine"	Collins	6:39
2.	"Jesus He Knows Me"	Collins	4:16
3.	"Driving the Last Spike"	Collins	10:08
Total length:			21:03

Side two
No.	Title	Lyrics	Length
1.	"I Can't Dance"	Collins	4:01
2.	"Never a Time"	Rutherford	3:50
3.	"Dreaming While You Sleep"	Rutherford	7:16
Total length:			15:07

Side three
No.	Title	Lyrics	Length
1.	"Tell Me Why"	Collins	4:58
2.	"Living Forever"	Banks	5:41
3.	"Hold on My Heart"	Collins	4:38
Total length:			15:17

Side four
No.	Title	Lyrics	Length
1.	"Way of the World"	Rutherford	5:38
2.	"Since I Lost You"	Collins	4:09
3.	"Fading Lights"	Banks	10:16
Total length:			20:03

=== B-sides ===
No.	Title	Single A-side	Length
1.	"On the Shoreline"	"I Can't Dance"	4:45
2.	"Hearts on Fire"	"Jesus He Knows Me"	5:15
Total length:			10:00

== Personnel ==
Credits are adapted from the album's 1991 sleeve notes. Genesis

- Tony Banks – keyboards
- Phil Collins – drums, percussion, vocals, drum machines
- Mike Rutherford – guitars, bass guitar

Production

- Genesis – production
- Nick Davis – production, engineering
- Mark Robinson – production and engineering assistant
- Geoff Callingham – technical assistance
- Mike Bowen – technical assistance
- David Scheinmann/Icon Photography – cover and art direction
- Felicity Roma Bowers – illustrations

== Charts ==
=== Weekly charts ===
Chart performance for We Can't Dance
Chart (1991–1993)	Peak position
Australian Albums (ARIA)	8
Austrian Albums (Ö3 Austria)	1
Belgian Albums (IFPI)	1
Canada Top Albums/CDs (RPM)	5
Danish Albums (Hitlisten)	2
Dutch Albums (Album Top 100)	1
European Albums (IFPI)	1
Finnish Albums (Suomen virallinen lista)	2
French Albums (IFOP)	2
German Albums (Offizielle Top 100)	1
Greek Albums (IFPI)	4
Hungarian Albums (MAHASZ)	7
Irish Albums (IRMA)	5
Italian Albums (FIMI)	2
Japanese Albums (Oricon)	8
New Zealand Albums (RMNZ)	5
Norwegian Albums (VG-lista)	1
Portuguese Albums (AFP)	6
Spanish Albums (AFYVE)	8
Swedish Albums (Sverigetopplistan)	4
Swiss Albums (Schweizer Hitparade)	1
UK Albums (Official Charts)	1
US Billboard 200	4

=== Year-end charts ===
1991 year-end chart performance for We Can't Dance
Chart (1991)	Position
Dutch Albums (Album Top 100)	89
Japanese Albums (Oricon)	92
Spanish Albums (AFYVE)	76
UK Albums (OCC)	13

1992 year-end chart performance for We Can't Dance
Chart (1992)	Position
Argentina Foreign Albums (CAPIF)	9
Australian Albums (ARIA)	26
Austrian Albums (Ö3 Austria)	1
Canadian Albums (RPM)	15
Dutch Albums (Album Top 100)	4
European Albums (IFPI)	2
German Albums (Offizielle Top 100)	1
Japanese Albums (Oricon)	34
New Zealand Albums (RMNZ)	17
Norwegian Albums (VG-lista)	21
Spanish Albums (AFYVE)	11
Swiss Albums (Schweizer Hitparade)	2
UK Albums (OCC)	9
US Billboard 200	13

== Certifications ==
Sales certifications for We Can't Dance
Region	Certification	Certified units/sales
Australia (ARIA)	2× Platinum	140,000^{^}
Austria (IFPI Austria)	Platinum	50,000^{*}
Canada (Music Canada)	4× Platinum	400,000^{^}
Denmark (IFPI Danmark)	Platinum	80,000^{^}
France (SNEP)	2× Platinum	600,000^{*}
Germany (BVMI)	5× Platinum	2,500,000^{^}
Italy (FIMI)	Platinum	200,000
Japan (RIAJ)	Gold	250,000
Netherlands (NVPI)	Platinum	100,000^{^}
New Zealand (RMNZ)	4× Platinum	60,000^{^}
Norway (IFPI Norway)	Platinum	50,000^{*}
Spain (Promusicae)	Platinum	100,000^{^}
Sweden (GLF)	Platinum	100,000^{^}
Switzerland (IFPI Switzerland)	4× Platinum	200,000^{^}
United Kingdom (BPI)	5× Platinum	1,500,000^{^}
United States (RIAA)	4× Platinum	4,000,000^{^}
Summaries
Europe (IFPI)	6× Platinum	6,000,000^{*}
^{*} Sales figures based on certification alone.^{^} Shipments figures based on certification alone.
