= Fading Lights =

1991 song by Genesis

Song by Genesis

from the album We Can't Dance
- Released: November 11, 1991
- Recorded: March – September 1991
- Genre: Progressive rock
- Length: 10:16
- Label: Virgin (UK); Atlantic (US)
- Composers: Tony Banks; Phil Collins; Mike Rutherford
- Lyricist: Tony Banks
- Producers: Nick Davis; Genesis

"Fading Lights" is the twelfth and final song on the album We Can't Dance by Genesis. The song was written by Tony Banks, Phil Collins, and Mike Rutherford, with lyrics by Tony Banks. At ten minutes and sixteen seconds, it is the longest song on the album.

The melody of the chorus' first line is reminiscent of that of their earlier track "Ripples" from A Trick of the Tail, and the song has a similar theme of relinquishing the past.

The drum machine loop at the beginning of the song was sampled and used on the song "I Love You...I'll Kill You" by the musical project Enigma on their second album, The Cross of Changes (as they also sampled drums from the We Can't Dance deep cut "Dreaming While You Sleep" for another song off the same album, "The Eyes of Truth").

The song was played live during the band's 1992 The Way We Walk tour and during The Last Domino? Tour. It also appears on their DVD The Way We Walk – Live in Concert.

"Fading Lights" was one of three songs on We Can't Dance (along with "Never a Time" and "Living Forever") in which the music was completely finished before any lyrics had been written.

AllMusic praised the song for its "outstanding" instrumental bridge.

== Versions ==
During the band's 2007 reunion tour the song was played as they left the stage at the conclusion of their performance. This can be seen on the When In Rome concert DVD.

A remixed version of the song was released on the We Can't Dance album featured in the SACD/DVD re-releases.

The song was included in the band's The Last Domino? Tour as the opening section of a medley with "The Cinema Show" and "Afterglow".

== Personnel ==
- Tony Banks – keyboards
- Phil Collins – vocals, drums, drum machine
- Mike Rutherford – electric guitars, bass guitar, bass pedals
