= Driving the Last Spike =

1991 song by Genesis

Song by Genesis

from the album We Can't Dance
- Released: 11 November 1991
- Recorded: 1991
- Studio: The Farm, Chiddingfold, Surrey
- Genre: Progressive rock
- Length: 10:08
- Label: Atlantic
- Composers: Tony Banks; Phil Collins; Mike Rutherford
- Lyricist: Phil Collins
- Producers: Nick Davis; Genesis

"Driving the Last Spike" is the third track on the Genesis album We Can't Dance, released in 1991.

The song's lyrics by Phil Collins are about the Navvies: railway workers of the 19th century, many of whom died constructing Britain's railways. The song narrates the thoughts and feelings of an unnamed railway worker in the form of a soliloquy or internal monologue. The title is a phrase meaning the completion of a major railway project—placing the "last spike" is often a momentous occasion. The original idea came from the book ‘The Railway Navvies’ by Terry Coleman that actor Dennis Waterman gave to Collins.

Despite not being released as a single, "Driving the Last Spike" charted in Canada and the United States, peaking at number 51 on the Canadian RPM Top Singles chart and number 25 on the US Billboard Album Rock Tracks chart.

== Live performances ==
"Driving the Last Spike" was performed live on the band's 1992 The Way We Walk Tour and was featured on the live album The Way We Walk, Volume Two: The Longs, and the live DVD The Way We Walk - Live in Concert.

== Personnel ==
- Tony Banks – keyboards
- Phil Collins – vocals, drums, drum machine
- Mike Rutherford – electric guitars, bass guitar

== Charts ==
Chart (1992)	Peak position
Canada Top Singles (RPM)	51
US Mainstream Rock (Billboard)	25

== See also ==
- List of train songs
