= No Son of Mine =

1991 single by Genesis

Single by Genesis

from the album We Can't Dance
- B-side: "Living Forever"
- Released: 21 October 1991
- Studio: The Farm (Surrey, England)
- Genre: Pop rock
- Length: 6:41 (album version); 4:41 (radio edit)
- Label: Virgin; Atlantic
- Composers: Tony Banks; Phil Collins; Mike Rutherford
- Lyricist: Phil Collins
- Producers: Genesis; Nick Davis; Robert Colby

Genesis singles chronology
"Throwing It All Away" (1987)	"No Son of Mine" (1991)	"I Can't Dance" (1991)

"No Son of Mine" is a song by the English rock group Genesis, released in October 1991 by Atlantic and Virgin Records as the lead single from their 14th album, We Can't Dance (1991). It reached No. 6 on the UK singles chart and No. 12 and 6 on the US Billboard Hot 100 and Cash Box Top 100. It was also a top-10 hit in several European countries and peaked atop Canada's RPM 100 Hit Tracks chart for five weeks.

== Music ==
The lyrics tell the story of a boy who runs away from his abusive home, and—after some reconsideration—attempts to return, only to be rejected by his father. In interviews, Phil Collins said that the lyrics are deliberately vague as to whether the narrator or his mother is the victim of the abuse.

The song has a distinctive sound heard during the intro and before the second verse. Referred to by the band as "elephantus", the sound was created by Tony Banks recording Mike Rutherford's guitar with a sampler and then playing three notes on the bottom register of the keyboard, greatly lowering the pitch. The working title of "No Son of Mine" was "Elephantus". The sound is also featured in the opening of the "I Can't Dance" single B-side "On the Shoreline". A similar sound is heard in former Genesis member Peter Gabriel's song "I Grieve", which was released a few years later, on the soundtrack to City of Angels.

The single included the eighth track from We Can't Dance, "Living Forever", as the B-side. The radio edit fades out the song's extended outro a minute in advance and deletes part of the second chorus. The music video makes use of the complete album version.

== Music video ==
The music video for "No Son of Mine" is melancholic, illustrating the scene in sepia tone. The video depicts what is discussed in the song, which is a conversation between a son and his father. During the last chorus, snowflakes begin appearing flying around the house; eventually, at the end, the scene pulls out to reveal that the scenes of confrontation have taken place in a snow globe that the son is holding. It was done by FYI (director Jim Yukich and producer Paul Flattery).

== Live performances ==
A live version appears on the albums The Way We Walk, Volume One: The Shorts, and Live Over Europe 2007, as well as on their DVDs The Way We Walk - Live in Concert and When in Rome 2007.

== Track listings ==
- 7-inch and cassette single
1. "No Son of Mine"
2. "Living Forever"
- 12-inch and CD single
1. "No Son of Mine"
2. "Living Forever"
3. "Invisible Touch" (live)

== Personnel ==
- Phil Collins – drums, lead and backing vocals
- Tony Banks – keyboards
- Mike Rutherford – lead, rhythm and bass guitars

== Charts ==
=== Weekly charts ===
Weekly chart performance for "No Son of Mine"
Chart (1991–1992)	Peak position
Australia (ARIA)	29
Austria (Ö3 Austria Top 40)	7
Belgium (Ultratop 50 Flanders)	12
Canada Top Singles (RPM)	1
Canada Adult Contemporary (RPM)	4
Denmark (IFPI)	4
Europe (Eurochart Hot 100)	4
Europe (European Hit Radio)	1
Finland (Suomen virallinen lista)	20
France (SNEP)	13
Germany (GfK)	3
Greece (IFPI)	9
Ireland (IRMA)	5
Italy (Musica e dischi)	2
Luxembourg (Radio Luxembourg)	2
Netherlands (Dutch Top 40)	8
Netherlands (Single Top 100)	7
New Zealand (Recorded Music NZ)	36
Norway (VG-lista)	4
Portugal (AFP)	2
Sweden (Sverigetopplistan)	13
Switzerland (Schweizer Hitparade)	8
UK Singles (Official Charts)	6
UK Airplay (Music Week)	1
US Billboard Hot 100	12
US Adult Contemporary (Billboard)	8
US Mainstream Rock (Billboard)	3
US Cash Box Top 100	6
Zimbabwe (ZIMA)	11

=== Year-end charts ===
1991 year-end chart performance for "No Son of Mine"
Chart (1991)	Position
Canada Top Singles (RPM)	50
Europe (European Hit Radio)	75
Italy (Musica e dischi)	56
Netherlands (Dutch Top 40)	93
Sweden (Topplistan)	74

1992 year-end chart performance for "No Son of Mine"
Chart (1992)	Position
Canada Top Singles (RPM)	64
Canada Adult Contemporary (RPM)	50
Germany (Media Control)	28
Italy (Musica e dischi)	58
US Billboard Hot 100	68
US Adult Contemporary (Billboard)	39
US Cash Box Top 100	44

== Release history ==
Release dates and formats for "No Son of Mine"
Region	Date	Format(s)	Label(s)	Ref.
United Kingdom	21 October 1991	7-inch vinyl; 12-inch vinyl; CD; cassette	Virgin	
Japan	7 November 1991	Mini-CD	Virgin	
Australia	11 November 1991	7-inch vinyl; 12-inch vinyl; cassette	Virgin	
Australia	18 November 1991	CD	Virgin	
Japan	21 November 1991	CD	Virgin	
