= Jesus He Knows Me =

1992 single by Genesis

Single by Genesis

from the album We Can't Dance
- B-side: "Hearts on Fire"
- Released: 13 July 1992
- Studio: The Farm (Surrey, England)
- Genre: Rock; progressive pop; new wave
- Length: 4:18 (single mix)
- Label: Atlantic; Virgin
- Songwriters: Tony Banks; Phil Collins; Mike Rutherford
- Producers: Genesis; Nick Davis

Genesis singles chronology
"Hold on My Heart" (1992)	"Jesus He Knows Me" (1992)	"Never a Time" (1992)

Music video
- "Jesus He Knows Me" on YouTube

"Jesus He Knows Me" is a song by the English rock band Genesis from their fourteenth studio album, We Can't Dance (1991), released in July 1992 by Atlantic and Virgin Records as the album's fourth single. The song, written by Tony Banks, Phil Collins and Mike Rutherford, is a satire of televangelism, released in a period when several televangelists such as Jimmy Swaggart, Robert Tilton and Jim Bakker were under investigation for promising financial success to their listeners, provided they sent money to them. The accompanying music video featured Collins as an unscrupulous televangelist and received a nomination for British Video of the Year at the 1993 Brit Award. The song reached No. 10 in Canada, No. 20 in the United Kingdom and No. 23 in the United States.

== Background ==
Before the lyrics were added, the song's title was "Do The New Thing", possibly referencing Tony Banks' opening keyboard notes, which are heard again in the bridge. According to the behind-the-scenes documentary Genesis: No Admittance, the first lyric Phil Collins wrote out of improvisation was the chorus line "Jesus, he knows me, and he knows I'm right". Following up that lyric logically took him to the idea of manic/fanatic Christians who believe that they are 'in touch' with the Almighty, which was best personified by televangelists, many of whom finance their lavish lifestyles by conning believers out of charitable donations. Banks commented that while he likes the song, it's a bit more cynical than Collins's usual style of songwriting.

== Release ==
Like all the singles from We Can't Dance, "Jesus He Knows Me" was released on two CDs as well as on vinyl editions. All formats featured the non-album track "Hearts on Fire" (later included on Genesis Archive 2: 1976–1992) as the primary B-side, while both CDs included an exclusive track.

The first CD contains "The Other Mix" of "I Can't Dance" (a remix by Ben Liebrand) and the second includes the rehearsal version of "Land of Confusion". "The Other Mix" is named as such because another version, the "Sex Mix," had been released some months before on the "I Can't Dance" CD single. The second CD was the fifth disc in "The Invisible Series," a collection of Genesis CDs which featured live recordings as extra tracks. The single mix of "Jesus He Knows Me" has a louder chorus than the album version, making it more suitable for radio play.

"Jesus He Knows Me" was awarded one of BMI's Pop Awards in 1993, honoring the songwriters, composers and music publishers of the song.

== Critical reception ==
Geoff Orens from AllMusic viewed the song as "surprisingly gritty". Larry Flick from Billboard magazine wrote, "Once again, venerable band digs into its double-platinum We Can't Dance opus and pulls out an instantly familiar, yet totally pleasing rock cut, tailor-made for play at several formats. Interesting twists come via a reggae-vibed break in the middle of the song and cutting lyrics. Be sure to check out the inventive music videoclip." Randy Clark from Cashbox felt the song "is a more hard-drivin' Genesis, this time with a send up on television evangelists, in contrast to the current hit ballad, 'Hold on My Heart'. Phil serves up either vocal style with equal ability and likeability." The Daily Vault's Christopher Thelen described it as "a slap in the face against television evangelists who are more concerned about fleecing their flocks than shepherding them, and contains some very sharp jabs against the more hypocritical ones." Kara Manning from Rolling Stone viewed "Jesus He Knows Me" as "a sharp indictment of televangelical piety."

== Music video ==
The music video for "Jesus He Knows Me" features Phil Collins as an unscrupulous televangelist who uses donations from his followers to support his luxurious lifestyle. Collins has admitted that he was specifically parodying Ernest Angley in the video. According to Collins on the BBC show Room 101, Angley was flattered by the parody and did not realize that his very occupation was being skewered. The opening monologue, which has been mistaken for a fictional scenario for the video clip, is based on an actual story Angley had told earlier in his career and which he recounted again in 2013. The comedic video also features band members Tony Banks and Mike Rutherford dressed as fellow evangelists. Collins, outfitted in an orange suit, portrays the leader of the "Oasis of Faith" television ministry and claims that the Lord wants him to raise $18 million from his viewers before the coming weekend. During the final chorus, cash rains down over the broadcast studio and stagehands collect more from the audience in baskets and wheelbarrows, meeting the goal. As the song fades out, Collins continues to preach before being dragged off the set by Rutherford and Banks, a reference to the ending of the video for "I Can't Dance".

Near the 1:40 mark, people can be seen holding a sign reading "Genesis 3:25," referring not to the Bible's Book of Genesis but to the fact that the band had been together for 25 years at that point and had three members for most of its existence. The third chapter of Genesis, in reality, only has 24 verses.

In the original version of the video, the "toll-free number" referred to in the lyrics was shown as 1-555-GEN-ESIS. This was covered up by a scroll bar in later edits of the video. (The 555 area code actually does not prefix any known toll-free telephone numbers.)

At the Brit Awards in 1993 the video was nominated for British Video of the Year.

== Live performances ==
The song was performed live on the 1992 We Can't Dance tour, although it was originally not going to be played because the band thought the live visuals were mocking religion. The band eventually decided to perform "Jesus He Knows Me" instead of "Living Forever," which was in the setlist at the time. Touring guitarist Daryl Stuermer played lead guitar, including a solo towards the end, while Mike Rutherford played bass.

== Track listings ==
- 7-inch and cassette single
1. "Jesus He Knows Me" (single mix)
2. "Hearts on Fire"
- UK CD1 and Australian CD single
1. "Jesus He Knows Me" (single mix)
2. "Hearts on Fire"
3. "I Can't Dance" (the other mix)
- UK CD2
1. "Jesus He Knows Me" (single mix)
2. "Hearts on Fire"
3. "Land of Confusion (rehearsal version)

== Personnel ==
- Tony Banks – keyboards
- Phil Collins – drums, vocals
- Mike Rutherford – electric guitars, bass guitar

== Charts ==
=== Weekly charts ===
Chart (1992)	Peak position
Australia (ARIA)	56
Austria (Ö3 Austria Top 40)	26
Belgium (Ultratop 50 Flanders)	18
Canada Top Singles (RPM)	10
Canada Adult Contemporary (RPM)	22
Europe (Eurochart Hot 100)	28
France (SNEP)	27
Germany (GfK)	13
Ireland (IRMA)	22
Netherlands (Dutch Top 40)	11
Netherlands (Single Top 100)	18
New Zealand (Recorded Music NZ)	35
Sweden (Sverigetopplistan)	38
UK Singles (Official Charts)	20
UK Airplay (Music Week)	4
US Billboard Hot 100	23
US Adult Contemporary (Billboard)	27
US Mainstream Rock (Billboard)	24
US Pop Airplay (Billboard)	12
US Cash Box Top 100	16

Chart (2025)	Peak position
Poland (Polish Airplay Top 100)	45

=== Year-end charts ===
Chart (1992)	Position
Canada Top Singles (RPM)	89
Europe (European Hit Radio)	10
Germany (Media Control)	74
UK Airplay (Music Week)	32

== Release history ==
Region	Date	Format(s)	Label(s)	Ref.
United Kingdom	13 July 1992	7-inch vinyl; CD; cassette	Virgin	
Australia	10 August 1992	CD; cassette	Virgin	
Japan	30 September 1992	CD	Virgin	

== Cover versions ==
In 2023, Swedish rock band Ghost released a cover of the song as the lead single for their EP Phantomime.

== Use in media ==
"Jesus He Knows Me" was featured in the 1996 Belgian film Le huitième jour by Jaco Van Dormael. The song was originally intended to be used in the 1995 The Simpsons episode "Bart Sells His Soul", but as the producers could not obtain the rights to use it, "In-A-Gadda-Da-Vida" by Iron Butterfly was used instead.
