= Hold on My Heart =

1992 single by Genesis

Single by Genesis

from the album We Can't Dance
- B-side: "Way of the World"
- Released: 6 April 1992
- Studio: The Farm (Surrey, England)
- Genre: Soft rock
- Length: 4:38
- Label: Virgin
- Songwriters: Tony Banks; Phil Collins; Mike Rutherford
- Producers: Genesis; Nick Davis; Robert Colby

Genesis singles chronology
"I Can't Dance" (1991)	"Hold on My Heart" (1992)	"Jesus He Knows Me" (1992)

"Hold on My Heart" is a song by English rock band Genesis from their 14th studio album, We Can't Dance (1991). The ballad was released as the album's third single on 6 April 1992 by Virgin Records. The song reached number one on the Canadian RPM 100 Hit Tracks chart, the RPM Adult Contemporary chart, and the US Billboard Adult Contemporary chart, as well as number 12 on the Billboard Hot 100. In the band's home country, the song peaked at number 16 on the UK Singles Chart.

== Music video ==
The music video for "Hold on My Heart" shows the band playing at an empty night club, similar to Collins' 1985 video for "One More Night". To create the visual effect seen in the music video, the music on the recording of the video was played fast and the "singing" was mimed fast. When the music was slowed down to normal speed, the members of the band appear to be moving in slow motion, similar to the video for "Wrapped Around Your Finger" by the Police.

== Live performances ==
The song was played live during The Way We Walk, Calling All Stations (with Ray Wilson on vocals, though rarely played in a low key to accommodate Wilson's voice), and Turn It On Again: The Tour tours. A live version appears on their albums The Way We Walk, Volume One: The Shorts, and Live over Europe 2007, as well as on their DVDs The Way We Walk — Live in Concert and When in Rome 2007.

== Track listings ==
- 7-inch and cassette single
1. "Hold on My Heart"
2. "Way of the World"
- UK CD single
1. "Hold on My Heart"
2. "Way of the World"
3. "Your Own Special Way" (live)
- Australian and Japanese CD single
1. "Hold on My Heart"
2. "Way of the World"
3. "Home by the Sea" (live)
4. "Your Own Special Way" (live)

== Personnel ==
- Tony Banks – keyboards
- Phil Collins – vocals, drum machine, toms, cymbals
- Mike Rutherford – electric guitar, bass guitar

== Charts ==
=== Weekly charts ===
Chart (1992)	Peak position
Australia (ARIA)	63
Belgium (Ultratop 50 Flanders)	16
Canada Top Singles (RPM)	1
Canada Adult Contemporary (RPM)	1
Denmark (IFPI)	4
Europe (Eurochart Hot 100)	32
France (SNEP)	19
Germany (GfK)	45
Ireland (IRMA)	20
Netherlands (Dutch Top 40)	11
Netherlands (Single Top 100)	13
UK Singles (Official Charts)	16
UK Airplay (Music Week)	8
US Billboard Hot 100	12
US Adult Contemporary (Billboard)	1
US Cash Box Top 100	11

=== Year-end charts ===
Chart (1992)	Position
Brazil (Crowley)	47
Canada Top Singles (RPM)	16
Canada Adult Contemporary (RPM)	7
Europe (European Hit Radio)	40
US Billboard Hot 100	62
US Adult Contemporary (Billboard)	2

== Release history ==
Region	Date	Format(s)	Label(s)	Ref(s).
United Kingdom	6 April 1992	7-inch vinyl; CD; cassette	Virgin	
Australia	20 April 1992	CD; cassette	Virgin	
Japan	21 May 1992	Mini-CD; CD	Virgin	
