= I Can't Dance =

1991 single by Genesis

Single by Genesis

from the album We Can't Dance
- B-side: "On the Shoreline"
- Released: 30 December 1991
- Studio: The Farm (Surrey, England)
- Genre: Blues rock
- Length: 4:04
- Label: Virgin
- Songwriters: Tony Banks; Phil Collins; Mike Rutherford
- Lyricist: Phil Collins
- Producers: Genesis; Nick Davis

Genesis singles chronology
"No Son of Mine" (1991)	"I Can't Dance" (1991)	"Hold on My Heart" (1992)

Music video
- "I Can't Dance" on YouTube

"I Can't Dance" is the fourth track from English rock band Genesis' 14th studio album, We Can't Dance (1991). It was released in December 1991 by Virgin Records as the second single from the record. The lyrics were written by drummer Phil Collins with music composed collectively by the band. The song peaked at number seven on both the US Billboard Hot 100 and the UK Singles Chart, and number three on the US Cash Box Top 100. It also received a Grammy Award nomination for Best Pop Performance by a Duo or Group With Vocals at 1993. In Europe, the song reached number one in Belgium and the Netherlands while peaking within the top five in Austria, Germany and Portugal. The accompanying music video for "I Can't Dance" was directed by Paul Flattery and Jim Yukich.

== Background ==
During one recording session, Mike Rutherford first created the main riff of the song he called "Heavy A Flat", to which Collins suddenly improvised the basic concept for "I Can't Dance". The riff was actually inspired by a Levi Strauss & Co. television commercial (in the studio, the song was created under the working title "Blue Jeans") that used the Clash song "Should I Stay or Should I Go". Originally, the band did not think of it as anything more than a joke recording that would be discarded quickly, because the song was too simple, too bluesy, and unlike Genesis' style. Tony Banks said in an interview: "It was one of those bits you thought was going to go nowhere. It sounded fun but wasn't really special".

It was not until Banks decided to add keyboard sound effects to complement Rutherford's playing that "I Can't Dance" took on a different feeling. The band came to appreciate the sly humour inherent in the song and chose to not only record it properly, but to put it on the album as a single.

Banks also said in an interview the recording of a song that featured minimal production indicated a direction Genesis could have gone to make themselves stand out better against the rising popularity of alternative rock: "Opposite to what Genesis has done as general practice, which is taking an idea and turning it into a long or complex composition, it was just taking an idea and leaving it alone".

== Critical reception ==
The Daily Vault's Christopher Thelen found that "I Can't Dance" is "a goofy number that features Genesis mocking themselves for being un-hip. (Best line from this song: 'Ooh, she's got a body under that shirt'—dirty old man alert!)" He added, "If you ever get a chance to view the video, watch it; it's hysterical." Sally Margaret Joy from Melody Maker wrote, "Phunny Phil, the Maker's Phavourite Phella, grinds and huffs his good self over one of those minimal, stab, crunch, plink, rock numbers. It seems to be a bit of a dig at those jeans ads that feature divine male bimbos." A reviewer from People Magazine described it as a "melodically fetching, radio-ready track", and "a simple slammer with an arrangement that shows off the group’s remarkable facility for aural atmospherics." Kara Manning from Rolling Stone named it "a gritty, tongue-in-cheek anthem for the average guy." Adam Higginbotham from Select viewed it as "provocatively smug". Ted Shaw from The Windsor Star wrote that "I Can't Dance", "with its bluesy melody and metallic effects, is unlike anything the band has ever done, and it's a wonderful pop creation."

== Music video ==
The music video for "I Can't Dance" (made by frequent collaborators Paul Flattery and Jim Yukich) illustrates the artifice and false glamour of television advertisements. Collins commented that the video was designed to poke fun at the models in jeans commercials and each verse refers to things models in these commercials do. During the first verse, he portrays a hitchhiker on a remote desert road in Hi Vista, California. A woman speeds past in a Porsche 911, then backs up to pick up a lizard at Collins' feet before driving off, leaving him stranded. Collins is seen on a beach in the second verse, trying to pull his jeans away from a sunbather's angry dog and for the third, he loses them in a pool game at a bar.

These scenes are intercut with footage of the band and film crew members setting up the areas as if to shoot a series of commercials. The video ends with a parody of the video for the Michael Jackson song "Black or White," in which Collins imitates Jackson's erratic dancing. Banks and Rutherford eventually arrive to escort Collins off the set, at which point he goes limp and they have to drag him away.

The song created the "'I Can't Dance' dance" (a series of stiff, stylised motions). Collins explained in an interview that when he was at stage school, he would see kids that would always use the same hand and the same foot when they were tap dancing, meaning they could not coordinate. He then copied their movements and the 'dance' was born.

Collins told Rolling Stone the music video and the song were a joke about male models in jeans commercials who could not dance or talk but could only walk in their jeans. He also said the audience was confused and could not figure out the joke because clearly Phil Collins can dance as he dances at the end of the video.

== Release ==
Single releases contained an extended remix entitled "Sex Mix". This was later released on the Genesis Archive 2: 1976–1992 box set retitled as the "12" Mix". The remixers were brothers Howard Gray and Trevor Gray of Apollo 440.

The B-side, "On the Shoreline", was also included on Genesis Archive 2: 1976–1992. The song features a sample of guitarist Mike Rutherford's guitar playing that was captured by Tony Banks during a jam session. The peculiar sound (dubbed "elephantus" by the band) was also used in the song "No Son of Mine." Several chord passages also appeared in "Living Forever." Rolling Stone commented that "On the Shoreline" is "enjoyable in an un-ironic way. Here, as usual, Phil Collins sounds most comfortable at the raspy apex of his vocal range, pushing his voice to the breaking point as Tony Banks' synths drift through like mists."

The "Jesus He Knows Me" CD single also included a version titled "I Can't Dance (the other mix)" with a running length of 5:59.

== Live performances ==
"I Can't Dance" was played live during The Way We Walk, Calling All Stations (with Ray Wilson on vocals), Turn It On Again and The Last Domino? tours. On the band's Turn It On Again Tour and The Last Domino? Tour, it was included as an encore. During live performances, the song was transposed to a lower key to accommodate Collins' deepening voice.

A live version appears on their albums The Way We Walk, Volume One: The Shorts, and Live over Europe 2007, as well as on their DVDs The Way We Walk - Live in Concert and When in Rome 2007

Rutherford and Daryl Stuermer accompanied Collins doing the walk across the stage.

Ray Wilson continued to cover the song on his solo live album after his departure from Genesis. His version is a bluesier rendition, closer to the original.

== Track listings ==
- 7-inch and cassette single
1. "I Can't Dance"
2. "On the Shoreline"
- 12-inch and CD single
1. "I Can't Dance"
2. "On the Shoreline"
3. "I Can't Dance" (sex mix)
- Australian CD single and Japanese mini-album
1. "I Can't Dance"
2. "On the Shoreline"
3. "In Too Deep" (live)
4. "That's All" (live)
- US CD single and Japanese mini-CD single
1. "I Can't Dance" (LP version) – 4:00
2. "I Can't Dance" (sex mix) – 6:59 (7:02 in Japan)
- US maxi-CD single
1. "I Can't Dance" (LP version) – 4:00
2. "On the Shoreline" – 4:45
3. "In Too Deep" (live) – 5:28
4. "That's All" (live) – 4:54
5. "I Can't Dance" (sex mix) – 6:59

== Personnel ==
- Tony Banks – keyboards
- Phil Collins – vocals, drums
- Mike Rutherford – electric guitars, bass guitar

== Charts ==
=== Weekly charts ===
Chart (1992)	Peak position
Australia (ARIA)	7
Austria (Ö3 Austria Top 40)	2
Belgium (Ultratop 50 Flanders)	1
Canada Top Singles (RPM)	3
Europe (Eurochart Hot 100)	8
Europe (European Dance Radio)	24
Europe (European Hit Radio)	1
France (SNEP)	9
Germany (GfK)	4
Ireland (IRMA)	7
Italy (Musica e dischi)	10
Netherlands (Dutch Top 40)	1
Netherlands (Single Top 100)	1
New Zealand (Recorded Music NZ)	10
Portugal (AFP)	3
Sweden (Sverigetopplistan)	13
Switzerland (Schweizer Hitparade)	8
UK Singles (Official Charts)	7
UK Airplay (Music Week)	1
US Billboard Hot 100	7
US Adult Contemporary (Billboard)	26
US Mainstream Rock (Billboard)	2
US Cash Box Top 100	3

=== Year-end charts ===
Chart (1992)	Position
Australia (ARIA)	67
Austria (Ö3 Austria Top 40)	14
Belgium (Ultratop)	12
Canada Top Singles (RPM)	27
Europe (Eurochart Hot 100)	20
Europe (European Hit Radio)	26
Germany (Media Control)	24
Netherlands (Dutch Top 40)	16
Netherlands (Single Top 100)	20
Sweden (Topplistan)	95
Switzerland (Schweizer Hitparade)	32
UK Singles (OCC)	74
UK Airplay (Music Week)	37
US Billboard Hot 100	55
US Album Rock Tracks (Billboard)	6
US Cash Box Top 100	31
US (Joel Whitburn's Pop Annual)	54

== Certifications ==
Region	Certification	Certified units/sales
Austria (IFPI Austria)	Gold	25,000^{*}
New Zealand (RMNZ)	Platinum	30,000^{‡}
^{*} Sales figures based on certification alone.^{‡} Sales+streaming figures based on certification alone.

== Release history ==
Region	Date	Format(s)	Label(s)	Ref(s).
United Kingdom	30 December 1991	CD; cassette	Virgin	
Australia	27 January 1992	CD; cassette	Virgin	
Japan	21 February 1992	Mini-CD; mini-album	Virgin	

== Covers ==
In the 1990s, "Weird Al" Yankovic created a parody of the video for "I Can't Dance" for his series Al TV, in which he appeared alongside the band. He added shots of himself to several of the band shots.

In 2007, German death metal group Debauchery recorded "I Can't Dance" and released it on their fourth album, Back in Blood.

In 2014, Finnish metal band Sonata Arctica released a cover of "I Can't Dance" as a bonus track on their album Ecliptica: Revisited; 15th Anniversary Edition. The band made a promotional video which features all of the band members dancing in cities that they visited during their Pariah's Child tour.

In 2019, Tuff singer Stevie Rachelle released a cover of "I Can't Dance" on his "Best sTuff" solo album on RLS Records.

In 2025, Blues singer Steve Marriner released a cover of "I Can't Dance" on his "Hear My Heart" album.
