= The Lamb Lies Down on Broadway (song) =

1974 song by Genesis

Single by Genesis

from the album The Lamb Lies Down on Broadway
- B-side: "Counting Out Time"
- Released: 1974 (US)
- Recorded: August–October 1974
- Genre: Progressive rock
- Length: 5:03 (album version); 3:15 (single version)
- Label: Atco Records/Atlantic (U.S.)
- Songwriters: Tony Banks, Phil Collins, Peter Gabriel, Steve Hackett, Mike Rutherford
- Producers: John Burns and Genesis

"The Lamb Lies Down on Broadway" is the first song from Genesis's 1974 album of the same name. The song was released as a single in the United States. Although it did not chart, it was frequently played on American FM radio stations.

The end of the song features the words "They say the neon lights are bright on Broadway. They say there's always magic in the air" from The Drifters' song "On Broadway". The studio recording features a variation on the former lyric ("They say the lights are always bright on Broadway"), but subsequent live recordings feature the original.

The bass-playing on the song by Mike Rutherford has been described as having "connotations of aggressive energy" that fits in well with the concept album's angry and defiant character Rael.

Record World called it "a theatrical rock event with a haunting plotline."

After Gabriel's departure, the Phil Collins-fronted incarnation of the band performed the song often during their first few tours, usually segueing into the closing section of "The Musical Box". A live version appears on Seconds Out from 1977 as well as part of the "Old Medley" on The Way We Walk, Volume Two: The Longs from 1993. The song was also played in full during the 1998 Calling All Stations tour, with Ray Wilson on vocals. For the 2021 The Last Domino? Tour they play a stripped-back, acoustic version of the song as part of a short acoustic section of the show which also included "That's All" and "Follow You, Follow Me". Gabriel also performed the song on some of his solo tours in 1977 and 1978. For his first two tours as a solo artist, Peter Gabriel often played the song during the encore.

== Personnel ==
- Peter Gabriel – lead vocals
- Phil Collins – drums, bell-tree, glockenspiel, triangle, wind chimes, tambourine, timbales, backing vocals
- Tony Banks – piano, RMI Electra Piano
- Mike Rutherford – fuzz bass
- Steve Hackett – electric guitars
