= I Know What I Like (In Your Wardrobe) =

1974 song by Genesis

Single by Genesis

from the album Selling England by the Pound
- B-side: "Twilight Alehouse"
- Released: February 1974
- Recorded: August 1973
- Genre: Progressive rock; psychedelic rock
- Length: 4:06
- Label: Charisma, Atlantic
- Songwriters: Tony Banks; Phil Collins; Peter Gabriel; Steve Hackett; Mike Rutherford
- Producers: John Burns; Genesis

Genesis singles chronology
"Watcher of the Skies" / "Willow Farm" (1972)	"I Know What I Like (In Your Wardrobe)" (1974)	"Counting Out Time" (1974)

Official audio
- "I Know What I Like (In Your Wardrobe)" on YouTube

"I Know What I Like (In Your Wardrobe)"

"I Know What I Like (In Your Wardrobe)" was the first charting single by English rock band Genesis. It was drawn from their 1973 album Selling England by the Pound. The single was released in the UK in February 1974, and became a minor hit in April 1974, when it reached number 21 in the UK singles chart.

== Writing and recording ==
The song's lyrics concern a young man, Jacob, who is employed as a groundsman and who says that he does not want to grow up and do great things, being perfectly happy where he is, pushing a lawn mower. Betty Swanwick's painting The Dream, which was used for the Selling England by the Pound album cover, inspired the lyrics; Swanwick added the mower to the original painting at the band's request.

The song, inspired by the Beatles, has a psychedelic rock sound, using hand percussion rhythms and a riff from Steve Hackett that originated from a jam between Hackett and Phil Collins. Keyboardist Tony Banks used a note played on the low end of the ARP synthesizer during the intro and ending to imitate the sound of a lawn mower. Banks wrote the vocal melody to the chorus. Most of the vocals were layered with both Peter Gabriel and Phil Collins singing the same lines in order to make the sound stronger.

Reviewing the song in The Guardian in 2014, Stevie Chick said "Clocking in at a shade over four minutes, 'I Know What I Like' rises with a heat-haze shimmer, before locking into a groove akin to Traffic's 'Hole in My Shoe', a hippy reverie that fits the song's slacker vibe like a pair of tailored bell-bottoms. The song's anti-hero is a misfit, like all the others in the Gabriel-era songbook, a drop-out happy with his lawnmowing life, despite the disapproving whispers of his suburban neighbours. His rebellion is soundtracked by a nagging, lazy sitar lick, a woozy singalong chorus, and a flute solo that Pan's People doubtless interpreted through the medium of dance when the song appeared on Top Of The Pops after reaching No 21 in the charts."

== Release and reception ==
Released by Charisma in the UK in February 1974, "I Know What I Like" was the band's only pop hit of their early years. At a time when progressive rock bands largely avoided the singles market, Genesis were openly fond of the pop song format, and even wrote two songs ("Happy the Man" and the unreleased "Wooden Mask") specifically with the intent of being non-album singles.

The B-side was the non-album track "Twilight Alehouse", also credited to the whole band. Its lyrics portray a lonely man who finds solace in the local tavern. The song had been in Genesis' live set since 1970, but was not recorded in the studio until 1972 during the Foxtrot sessions, and it was left off Foxtrot because the band members felt it did not hold up to their newer material. "Twilight Alehouse" was later released on Genesis Archive 1967–75, now accurately credited to Banks-Gabriel-Phillips-Rutherford (Phillips being Anthony Phillips, Genesis's original guitarist).

== Live performance ==
The song was performed live during the Selling England by the Pound Tour between 1973 and 1974, Peter Gabriel put a helmet and two leaves of wheat in his mouth while pretending to use a lawnmower at the beginning and end of the song. Gabriel used to tell stories at the beginning of songs, and he spoke about a man who sees everyone wasting time on insignificant things, while he entertains himself while mowing the grass. A recording of the song during a concert at the Rainbow Theatre in London can be heard on the Genesis Archive 1967–75 compilation album.

Later live versions of this song (such as the one on Seconds Out) feature an extended instrumental section which includes snippets of various other Genesis songs – such as "Visions of Angels", "Blood on the Rooftops", "Dancing with the Moonlit Knight" and "Stagnation" – and songs by other artists, such as "Don't Let Me Be Misunderstood". In the version on "The Way We Walk", snippets include "Follow You Follow Me", "That's All", "Illegal Alien" and "Your Own Special Way". Phil Collins performed a dance during these instrumentals, using a tambourine in a tight, rhythmic fashion against his hands, elbows, knees, feet, buttocks and head; this can be seen in the Genesis: In Concert film from 1977, as well as the live DVDs The Way We Walk – Live in Concert (1992) and When in Rome 2007. In his memoir Not Dead Yet, Collins describes the dance as "a cross between morris dancing and John Cleese's The Ministry of Silly Walks".

For The Way We Walk and Turn It On Again tours, this song was played as part of a medley of old Genesis songs, and starting with the A Trick of the Tail tour in 1976 was often performed with excerpts of "Stagnation", from the album Trespass (1970). During the Turn It On Again tour shows, images from the band's history cycled by in the background.

== Cover versions ==
In 1993, Marillion's ex-frontman Fish did a cover version on his Songs from the Mirror album. Fish said his decision to cover the song was to prove to his critics that he could interpret a song differently from Gabriel, having been previously dismissed in his career as a Gabriel clone.

== Personnel ==
- Peter Gabriel – lead vocal, flute, percussion
- Tony Banks – Hammond organ, ARP Pro Soloist synthesizer, Mellotron
- Steve Hackett – electric guitar
- Mike Rutherford – bass guitar, electric sitar
- Phil Collins – drums, assorted percussion, harmony vocals

== Cultural references ==
The presenters of Top Gear and The Grand Tour have mixed views on the song, particularly Jeremy Clarkson and Richard Hammond, with Clarkson being a fan of Genesis and Hammond expressing a dislike of the group's music. The song subsequently became a recurring gag during the show following the "Middle East Special", in which Clarkson modified the stereo in Hammond's car to play the track on a loop. In Top Gear's "India Special", Clarkson played the song through a megaphone attachment on his car to annoy Hammond and played the song in an unsuccessful attempt to get Hammond out of the way whilst racing towards the finishing point in "Top Gear: African Special".
