= Firth of Fifth =

Song by Genesis

from the album Selling England by the Pound
- Released: 28 September 1973
- Genre: Progressive rock
- Length: 9:40
- Label: Charisma; Atlantic
- Songwriters: Tony Banks; Phil Collins; Peter Gabriel; Steve Hackett; Mike Rutherford
- Producers: John Burns; Genesis

"Firth of Fifth" is a song by the English progressive rock band Genesis. It first appeared as the third track on their 1973 album Selling England by the Pound, and was performed as a live piece either in whole or in part throughout the band's career.

== Composition ==
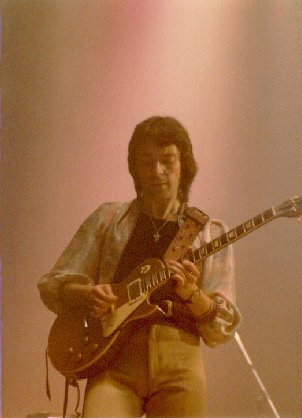
Steve Hackett's guitar solo on "Firth of Fifth" has become a favourite among Genesis fans.

The title is a pun on the Firth of Forth, the estuary of the River Forth in Scotland. The song theme relates to the "river of constant change", as quoted in the closing line. Though the song is credited to the entire band, most of the music was composed by keyboardist Tony Banks, with a prominent solo by guitarist Steve Hackett based on the flute melody composed by Banks. Banks had written the bulk of the song by 1972, presenting it as a candidate for the album Foxtrot (1972), but it was rejected. He redesigned the piece, which the group accepted as a candidate for Selling England by the Pound. Banks, who worked on the lyrics with Mike Rutherford, later dismissed them, saying they were "one of the worst sets of lyrics [I have] been involved with".

The song has three distinct musical parts. It starts out with a classical-style grand piano introduction played by Banks in the key of B flat. That section is rhythmically complex, with certain bars in the rare time signatures of 13/16 and 15/16, alternating with bars of 2/4. The section changes tempo and segues into the first verse (of three) of the song, accompanied by Phil Collins on drums and a chord progression between Hammond organ (Banks), bass (Rutherford) and guitar (Hackett).

After the first two verses, a short bridge leads into an instrumental section that starts with a flute melody played by Peter Gabriel, followed by a synth-driven section which restates the opening piano theme. Hackett then restates the flute melody using violin-like guitar tones. Peter Gabriel sings the third verse of lyrics and a closing line before Banks concludes the song on piano, restating a motif from the opening section before fading out.

== Live performances ==
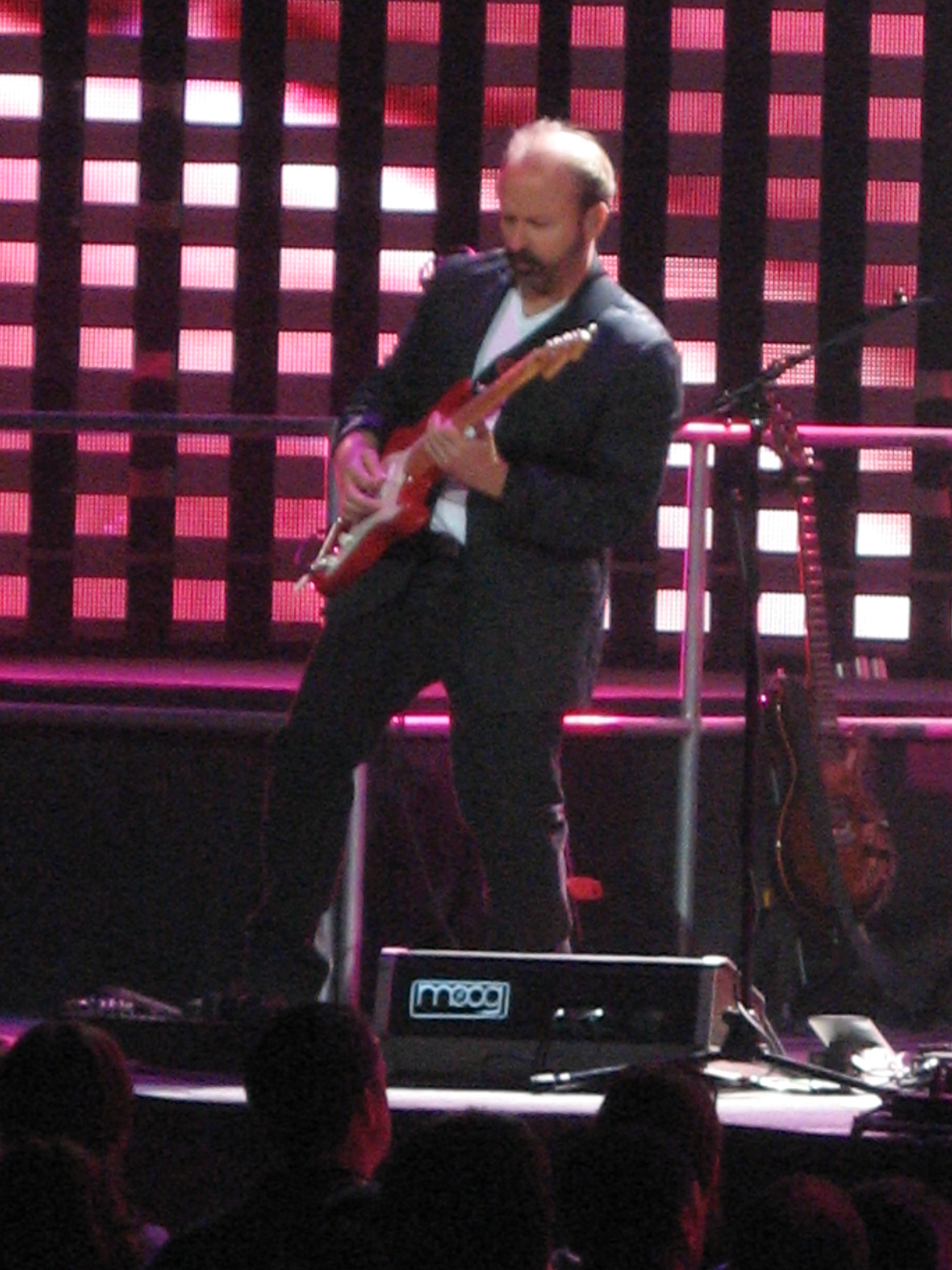
Daryl Stuermer playing the guitar solo in "Firth of Fifth" live with Genesis in 2007

From autumn 1973 onwards, the song's piano intro was omitted during live performances. Tony Banks felt he could not play the introduction live effectively, because he used an RMI electric piano on stage, which was not touch-sensitive. During one concert, Banks accidentally played one of the initial piano notes wrongly, which caused Phil Collins to have to start his drums to fix the mistake by starting Peter Gabriel's verses early. The error led to the introduction being deleted in later concerts.

The song survived the departure of Peter Gabriel in 1975, with Phil Collins taking over to sing lead. A live recording of the song at the Palais des Sports in Paris was included on the live album Seconds Out.

The song was removed from the group's 1978 tour following the departure of Steve Hackett in 1977. It was reinstated for the 1981 tour, and performed for the Six of the Best reunion show in 1982.

A 1981 live recording from the Savoy in New York was included as the B side of the UK release of the 12" single of "That's All".

The instrumental section of the song, featuring the guitar solo, was resurrected for the Mama Tour in 1983–84, as well as the We Can't Dance tour in 1992, with touring member Daryl Stuermer playing Hackett's guitar parts. That section of the song featured on the Calling All Stations tour in 1998, with Anthony Drennan playing guitar. It was resurrected for the 2007's Turn It On Again: The Tour and in 2021–22 during the Last Domino? Tour, again featuring Stuermer, with Collins's son Nic playing drums during the latter tour. The instrumental segues directly into "I Know What I Like (In Your Wardrobe)" in the 1992, 2007 and 2021–22 versions.

Hackett has continued to play the song live since leaving Genesis. It appears on his solo album of re-worked Genesis songs, Watcher of the Skies: Genesis Revisited (1996) and The Tokyo Tapes (1998), with John Wetton singing and playing bass on both versions. The song was also included as an encore on his Genesis Revisited tour (2013–2014), featured on the live album Genesis Revisited: Live at Hammersmith (2013) and also on Selling England By The Pound & Spectral Mornings: Live At Hammersmith (2020).

== Reception ==
The song has had a strongly positive critical response as one of the best examples of progressive rock. Particular highlights of the track include Banks' piano introduction and Hackett's guitar solo. Rock author Edward Macan describes "Firth of Fifth" as "one of the finest nine and half minutes of music that Genesis ever put down". Genesis biographers Dave Bowler and Bryan Dray describe Hackett's solo as "the crowning moment of Hackett's time with the band."

Hackett has spoken favourably about his contributions to the song, saying, "It'll always be twinned with me, and I still enjoy playing it. It's a great melody for guitar."
