= Nick Davis (music producer) =

Sound engineer and record producer

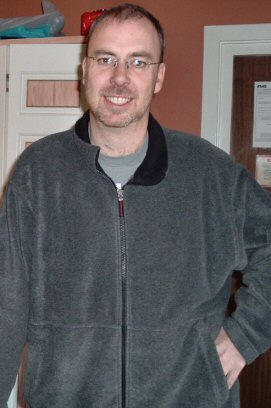
Nick Davis.

Nick Davis is a sound engineer and record producer who is best known for his work with the English rock band Genesis. He has also produced solo albums for several members of Genesis and other bands. In 2010 Davis was nominated for a Grammy for his work on album Genesis 1970–1975.

== Discography ==
=== Record producer ===
Davis has produced or served as a sound engineer for the following albums:

- Marillion: Seasons End (1989), Marillion.com (1999) (mixer)
- Genesis: We Can't Dance (1991), Calling All Stations (1997), Genesis Archive 1967-75 (1998), Genesis Archive 2: 1976-1992 (2000)
- Tony Banks: Still (1991), Strictly Inc (1995), Seven: A Suite For Orchestra (2004), Six (2012), Five (2018)
- XTC: Wasp Star (Apple Venus Volume 2) (2000)
- Mike + the Mechanics: Word of Mouth (1991), Beggar on a Beach of Gold (1995), Hits (1996), Mike & The Mechanics (1999) (aka M6), Rewired (2004)
- Sound of Contact: Dimensionaut (2013)

=== Surround-sound mixer ===
On the following albums and DVDs, Davis remixed the stereo audio, and mixed the 5.1-channel surround sound audio:

- Genesis: The Way We Walk – Live in Concert DVD, Live at Wembley Stadium DVD, The Video Show DVD, Platinum Collection, Genesis 1976-1982

SACD/DVD box sets (new 5.1-channel surround sound and stereo mixes) of all Genesis studio albums were created by Davis:

- Genesis: Genesis 1970–1975, Genesis 1976–1982, Genesis 1983–1998

Davis sound-recorded and mixed Marillion's Live from Loreley.
