= ...And Then There Were Three... Tour =

1978 concert tour by Genesis

- Tour by Genesis
- Location: Europe; Japan; North America
- Associated album: ...And Then There Were Three...
- Start date: 28 March 1978
- End date: 3 December 1978
- No. of shows: 97 (98 scheduled)

Genesis concert chronology
- Wind & Wuthering Tour (1977); ...And Then There Were Three... Tour (1978); Duke Tour (1980)

The ...And Then There Were Three... Tour (also known as the Mirrors Tour) was a concert tour by the English rock band Genesis to promote their ninth studio album ...And Then There Were Three... released in 1978. The tour began on 28 March 1978 in Binghamton, New York in the United States and concluded on 3 December 1978 in Tokyo, Japan. It was the first tour without guitarist Steve Hackett, who would be replaced by Daryl Stuermer.

== Background ==
Because of Steve Hackett's departure, the events following Genesis' live album Seconds Out saw them searching for a new member who could play both bass and guitar parts, as Mike Rutherford wanted to play lead guitar for the band's new material, while playing twelve-string and bass elsewhere. The band initially auditioned Pat Thrall and Elliot Randall, and then trying Alphonso Johnson from Weather Report.

Partly due to differences in Johnson's playing style which he felt did not match that of the other band members and being unable to comfortably perform Hackett's guitar parts, he then pointed them to Daryl Stuermer, who had been performing with French jazz-fusion artist and violinist Jean-Luc Ponty. In New York, Stuermer auditioned for the role and was then hired by Rutherford after successful sessions of performing lead guitar on "Squonk" and bass guitar on "Down and Out". The band also added the Nursery Cryme track "The Fountain of Salmacis" to the running setlist, with the goal of allowing Stuermer to add his own style to a song with a distinct Hackett solo on it. The tour is sometimes known as the "Mirrors Tour" due to the expensive staging for the tour that in addition to lights and lasers, also included six computer-controlled mirrors. This setup cost the band £2 million (equivalent to almost £15 million in 2026).

The tour was marred by Phil Collins having a falling out with his then-wife, with the frontman and drummer having to frequent trips to Vancouver. During their divorce, the band's final stop on the tour was in Japan, in which Collins constantly drank. Of the row of Japanese shows, Collins recalled: "I went to Japan, and spent ten days drunk. I hated every minute of it. I couldn't sing and everyone was concerned about my welfare although there was nothing anyone could do about it."

After the attempt to salvage his marriage failed, the band would take a break and a period of inactivity ensued. Both Tony Banks and Rutherford released their debut solo albums (A Curious Feeling and Smallcreep's Day respectively), while the events of Collins' divorce influenced the sessions that would result in his own debut solo album, Face Value. In addition to his own work, Collins also used this period of inactivity to play drums for former bandmate Peter Gabriel on his third self-titled solo album, as well as rejoining jazz fusion band Brand X in the sessions for their fourth album Product.

== Recordings ==
There is no officially endorsed live album of the tour, but two tracks, "Burning Rope" and "The Fountain of Salmacis" were later released on either live albums or compilations by the band. Both songs were recorded at The Summit in Houston, the former being featured on the band's Archive 2 collection, while the latter was featured on the original UK pressing of the 1982 live album Three Sides Live.

== Set list ==
A typical set list included:

1. "Eleventh Earl of Mar"
2. "In the Cage"
3. "Burning Rope"
4. "Ripples"
5. "Deep in the Motherlode"
6. "The Fountain of Salmacis" (Note: Was a mainstay in the tour setlist until 6 September 1978, after which it was dropped. It was performed one final time in Houston on 22 October 1978, which is the version that would be multi-tracked and used on the Three Sides Live album in the UK. Releases outside of the British Isles excluded it in favour of including non-album singles as well as tracks from the band's 3×3 EP.)
7. "One for the Vine"
8. "Squonk"
9. "Say It's Alright Joe"
10. "The Lady Lies"
11. "The Cinema Show"
12. "Afterglow"
13. "Follow You, Follow Me"
14. "Dance on a Volcano"
15. Drum Duet / "Los Endos"
  Encore
16. "I Know What I Like (In Your Wardrobe)"

=== Other songs performed ===
- "Down and Out" (Eliminated after 13 July 1978) (Note: Was a mainstay in the setlist until June 1978, in which it was alternated with Ballad of Big. The song's last known performance is 13 July 1978 in Montreal, Canada, with no known recordings that indicate the song was ever performed again.)
- "Ballad of Big" (Added on 1 June 1978, and eliminated after 6 September 1978) (Note: Was introduced on the band's first European leg and would be alternated with "Down and Out" until both were eventually eliminated from the setlist.)
- "Supper's Ready" (Performed on 28 March, 27 May, and 9 September 1978 only) (Note: "Apocalypse in 9/8" and "As Sure as Eggs is Eggs" sections only. The song was performed as a second encore after "I Know What I Like (In Your Wardrobe)".)
- "The Lamb Lies Down on Broadway" (As a part of a medley with The Musical Box; Performed on 28 August 1978 only) (Note: Performed as a second encore alongside "The Musical Box" after "I Know What I Like (In Your Wardrobe)".)
- "The Musical Box" (closing section) (Performed on 28 August, 13 October, 14 October 1978 only) (Note: The version on 28 August is performed alongside "The Lamb Lies Down on Broadway" in the same manner it was performed as an encore during the Wind & Wuthering Tour, while on the 13th and 14th October dates it was extended to include part of the instrumental section before the song's closing section as a segue from "Dancing with the Moonlit Knight".)
- "Dancing with the Moonlit Knight" (Performed on 13 and 14 October 1978 only) (Note: The version of "Dancing with the Moonlit Knight" performed on the two Chicago dates is an abridged version that ditches the song's outro in favour of segueing into "The Musical Box".)

== Tour dates ==
| Date | City | Country | Venue |
North America
| 28 March 1978 | Binghamton | United States | Broome County Arena |
| 29 March 1978 | Buffalo | United States | Buffalo Memorial Auditorium |
| 30 March 1978 | Rochester | United States | Rochester Community War Memorial |
| 31 March 1978 | Philadelphia | United States | Philadelphia Spectrum |
| 1 April 1978 | Viola (Note: Labelled as Rockland in promotional material) | United States | Rockland Community College Fieldhouse |
| 2 April 1978 | State College | United States | Rec Hall |
| 3 April 1978 | Bloomington | United States | Met Center |
| 4 April 1978 | Kalamazoo | United States | Wings Stadium |
| 5 April 1978 | Normal | United States | Horton Fieldhouse |
| 6 April 1978 | Chicago | United States | Chicago Stadium |
| 7 April 1978 | Richfield Township | United States | Richfield Coliseum |
| 8 April 1978 | Trotwood (Note: Labelled as Dayton in promotional material) | United States | Hara Arena |
| 9 April 1978 | Bloomington | United States | Assembly Hall |
| 10 April 1978 | St. Louis | United States | Kiel Auditorium |
| 14 April 1978 | Oakland | United States | Oakland Coliseum |
| 15 April 1978 | San Diego | United States | San Diego Sports Arena |
| 17 April 1978 | Inglewood (Note: Labelled as Los Angeles in promotional material) | United States | The Forum |
| 22 April 1978 | Montréal | Canada | Montréal Forum |
Europe
| 14 May 1978 | Cologne | West Germany | Sporthalle |
| 15 May 1978 | Frankfurt | West Germany | Festhalle |
| 16 May 1978 | Munich | West Germany | Olympiahalle |
| 17 May 1978 | Mannheim | West Germany | Eisstadion am Friedrichspark |
| 18 May 1978 | Cologne | West Germany | Sporthalle |
| 20 May 1978 | Leiden | Netherlands | Groenoordhallen |
| 21 May 1978 | Brussels | Belgium | Forest National |
| 22 May 1978 | Brussels | Belgium | Forest National |
| 24 May 1978 | Nantes | France | Palais de la Beaujoire |
| 26 May 1978 | Paris | France | Palais des Sports |
| 27 May 1978 | Paris | France | Palais des Sports |
| 28 May 1978 | Paris | France | Palais des Sports |
| 29 May 1978 | Paris | France | Palais des Sports |
| 30 May 1978 | Poitiers | France | PdS Poitiers |
| 1 June 1978 | Lyon | France | PdS Gerland |
| 2 June 1978 | Saint-Étienne | France | Palais des Congrès |
| 3 June 1978 | Dijon | France | PdS Jean-Michel Geoffroy |
| 4 June 1978 | Zürich | Switzerland | Hallenstadion |
| 6 June 1978 | Malmö | Sweden | Malmö Isstadion |
| 7 June 1978 | Gothenburg | Sweden | Scandinavium |
| 8 June 1978 | Oslo | Norway | Ekeberghallen |
| 9 June 1978 | Helsinki | Finland | Helsinki Ice Hall |
| 11 June 1978 | West Berlin | West Germany | Deutschlandhalle |
| 12 June 1978 | Bremen | West Germany | Stadthalle |
| 13 June 1978 | Hamburg | West Germany | Ernst-Merck-Halle |
| 14 June 1978 | Dortmund | West Germany | Westfalenhalle |
| 24 June 1978 | Stevenage (Note: Labelled as Knebworth in promotional material) | England | Knebworth House |
North America
| 3 July 1978 | Toronto | Canada | Maple Leaf Gardens |
| 10 July 1978 | Toronto | Canada | CNE Exhibition Place |
| 12 July 1978 | Montréal | Canada | Montréal Forum |
| 13 July 1978 | Montréal | Canada | Montréal Forum |
| 14 July 1978 | Independence Township (Note: Labelled as Clarkston in promotional material) | United States | Pine Knob Music Theatre |
| 15 July 1978 | Detroit | United States | Cobo Arena |
| 16 July 1978 | Detroit | United States | Cobo Arena |
| 17 July 1978 | Milwaukee | United States | Summerfest Grounds |
| 18 July 1978 | Milwaukee | United States | Summerfest Grounds |
| 19 July 1978 | Milwaukee | United States | Summerfest Grounds |
| 21 July 1978 | Cincinnati | United States | Riverfront Coliseum |
| 22 July 1978 | Pittsburgh | United States | Pittsburgh Civic Arena |
| 23 July 1978 | Syracuse | United States | Onondaga County War Memorial |
| 25 July 1978 | Columbia | United States | Merriweather Post Pavilion |
| 26 July 1978 | Columbia | United States | Merriweather Post Pavilion |
| 27 July 1978 | Norfolk | United States | Norfolk Scope |
| 28 July 1978 | Hampton | United States | Hampton Coliseum |
| 29 July 1978 | New York City | United States | Madison Square Garden |
| 30 July 1978 | Providence | United States | Providence Civic Center |
| 31 July 1978 | Saratoga Springs | United States | Saratoga Performing Arts Center |
Europe
| 26 August 1978 | Ulm | West Germany | Friedrich-Festplatz |
| 28 August 1978 | Vienna | Austria | Wiener Stadthalle |
| 30 August 1978 | Hanover | West Germany | Messegelände Hannover |
| 1 September 1978 | Cologne | West Germany | Radrennbahn |
| 3 September 1978 | Saarbrücken | West Germany | Ludwigsparkstadion |
| 4 September 1978 | Maastricht | Netherlands | Eurohal Maastricht |
| 5 September 1978 | Arnhem | Netherlands | Rijnhal |
| 6 September 1978 | Rotterdam | Netherlands | Ahoy Rotterdam |
| 9 September 1978 | La Courneuve | France | Parc de La Courneuve |
North America
| 29 September 1978 | Pembroke Pines | United States | Hollywood Sportatorium |
| 30 September 1978 | Lakeland | United States | Lakeland Civic Center |
| 4 October 1978 | Atlanta | United States | Omni Coliseum |
| 5 October 1978 | ~~Birmingham~~ | United States | ~~Boutwell Memorial Auditorium~~ |
| 6 October 1978 | Baton Rouge | United States | Riverside Centroplex |
| 8 October 1978 | Nashville | United States | Municipal Auditorium |
| 10 October 1978 | Columbus | United States | St. John Arena |
| 11 October 1978 | East Lansing | United States | Jenison Fieldhouse |
| 12 October 1978 | Champaign | United States | Champaign Assembly Hall |
| 13 October 1978 | Chicago | United States | Uptown Theatre |
| 14 October 1978 | Chicago | United States | Uptown Theatre |
| 16 October 1978 | Springfield | United States | Hammons Student Center |
| 17 October 1978 | Kansas City | United States | Kemper Arena |
| 18 October 1978 | Norman | United States | Lloyd Noble Center |
| 20 October 1978 | Austin | United States | Austin Municipal Auditorium |
| 21 October 1978 | Dallas | United States | Reunion Arena |
| 22 October 1978 | Houston | United States | The Summit |
Japan
| 27 November 1978 | Tokyo | Japan | Tokyo Koseinenkin Hall |
| 28 November 1978 | Tokyo | Japan | Nakano Sunplaza |
| 29 November 1978 | Tokyo | Japan | Nakano Sunplaza |
| 30 November 1978 | Osaka | Japan | Osaka Koseinenkin Hall |
| 2 December 1978 | Tokyo | Japan | Nakano Sunplaza |
| 3 December 1978 | Tokyo | Japan | Tokyo Koseinenkin Hall |

== Personnel ==
Genesis

- Phil Collins – lead vocals, drums, percussion
- Tony Banks – Hammond T-102 Organ, Mellotron M400, Yamaha CP-70 Electric Grand Piano, ARP 2600, Polymoog, 12-string guitar, backing vocals
- Mike Rutherford – 6 & 12-string guitars, bass, Moog Taurus bass pedals, backing vocals

Additional musicians

- Daryl Stuermer – bass, guitar, backing vocals
- Chester Thompson – drums, percussion
