= Your Own Special Way =

Single by Genesis

from the album Wind & Wuthering
- B-side: "It's Yourself" (UK) "...In That Quiet Earth" (US)
- Released: 4 February 1977
- Studio: Relight Studios (Hilvarenbeek, Netherlands)
- Genre: Progressive pop
- Length: 6:19; 3:49 (UK single edit); 3:03 (US single edit)
- Label: Charisma
- Songwriter: Mike Rutherford
- Producers: David Hentschel; Genesis

Genesis singles chronology
"Ripples…" (1976)	"Your Own Special Way" (1977)	"Follow You Follow Me" (1978)

"Your Own Special Way" is a song by the English progressive rock band Genesis. The song was written by the band's bassist and guitarist Mike Rutherford. Released (in edited form) as the first and only single from their eighth studio album Wind & Wuthering, it became the band's first song to chart on the Billboard Hot 100, peaking at number 62. The laid-back nature of the song stood in stark contrast to much of the band's earlier material and foreshadowed many of the band's later hits, such as "Follow You Follow Me" on their next album.

"Your Own Special Way" was the last single Genesis released with guitarist Steve Hackett, until the band's 1999 re-recording of "The Carpet Crawlers" (which also included original lead vocalist Peter Gabriel).

== Background ==
"Your Own Special Way" was written solely by Rutherford and is the third track on Wind & Wuthering. It was written and performed with an open guitar tuning. The main body of the song was merged with an unrelated piece of music, performed on a Fender Rhodes electric piano, to create the final track.

In keeping with the theme of literary references common throughout the album, there is a reference in the song to the title of Christina Rossetti's poem "Who Has Seen the Wind?".

== Release ==
"Your Own Special Way" was released as a single on 4 February 1977 (backed with the non-album track "It's Yourself" in the UK). It became Genesis' greatest success in the US up to that time, peaking at number 62 and becoming their first song to chart in that country.

The song was the band's second to chart in their native UK (after the number 21 hit "I Know What I Like (In Your Wardrobe)", peaking at number 43. The success of the song, alongside Genesis' increasing profile, made Wind & Wuthering their most successful album in the US at the time, reaching number 26 and becoming their first top-30 album.

== Live performances ==
"Your Own Special Way" was a mainstay in the Wind & Wuthering Tour, from its beginning on 1st January 1977 until 3rd April 1977 at the end of The North American Leg of the tour. From 10th May onwards it was dropped in favor of "Inside and Out".

The song was revived during the band's visit to Australia in 1986 for The Invisible Touch Tour, where it was performed with a string section. A version of the song, performed at the Sydney Entertainment Centre in December 1986, was included on Genesis Archive 2: 1976-1992 as well as being included in some CD Single releases of Hold on My Heart.

== Reception ==
In a contemporary review of the single, Record World said that it "should assure some degree of single success" and that "Phil Collins' vocal could set the spark". Cashbox highlighted the song's "majestic and memorable melodies", saying that its "cathedral harmonies and layered synthesizers add[ed] further dimension to the sound." They also expressed their belief that the single "could be the one to prove that Genesis' depth of songwriting talent need not to be confined to album-oriented airplay.

== Legacy ==
The song has been included on numerous compilations, including Turn it on Again: The Hits (The Tour Edition) and Platinum Collection.

== Charts ==
Chart (1977)	Peak position
Canada Top Singles (RPM)	83
UK Singles (OCC)	43
US Billboard Hot 100	62
