= Wind & Wuthering Tour =

1977 concert tour by Genesis

- Tour by Genesis
- Location: Europe; North America; South America
- Associated album: Wind & Wuthering; Spot the Pigeon
- Start date: 1 January 1977
- End date: 3 July 1977
- No. of shows: 97

Genesis concert chronology
- A Trick of the Tail Tour (1976); Wind & Wuthering Tour (1977); ...And Then There Were Three... Tour (1978)

The Wind & Wuthering Tour was a concert tour by the English rock band Genesis.

Their last tour with guitarist Steve Hackett prior to his departure, and the first with Chester Thompson as their touring drummer, the tour was staged in support of their 1976 album Wind & Wuthering and their 1977 extended play Spot the Pigeon, visiting theatres and arenas from January to July 1977. The band used improved sound and stage lighting systems than before, including a set of Boeing aircraft landing lights. The tour featured Genesis' first South American dates, playing eight shows in three Brazilian cities, drawing large crowds and an enthusiastic response from fans and the press. Recordings from the tour's dates in Paris were used for the band's second live album Seconds Out, released in 1977.

== Set list ==
A typical set list included:

Set list from 1 January 1977 – 8 January 1977

1. "Eleventh Earl of Mar"
2. "The Carpet Crawlers"
3. "Firth of Fifth"
4. "Your Own Special Way"
5. "Robbery, Assault and Battery"
6. "... In That Quiet Earth"
7. "Afterglow"
8. Medley: (first night only)
  1. "Liliywhite Lilith"
  2. "The Waiting Room"
  3. "Wot Gorilla?"
9. "One for the Vine"
10. "Squonk"
11. "All in a Mouse's Night"
12. "Supper's Ready"
13. "I Know What I Like (In Your Wardrobe)"
14. "Dance on a Volcano"
15. Drum Duet / "Los Endos"

Encore

1. "The Lamb Lies Down on Broadway" / "The Musical Box" (closing section)

Set list from 9 January 1977 onwards

1. "Squonk"
2. "One for the Vine"
3. "Robbery, Assault and Battery"
4. "Your Own Special Way" (dropped after 3 April 1977)
5. "Inside and Out" (after 3 April 1977)
6. "Firth of Fifth"
7. "The Carpet Crawlers"
8. "...In That Quiet Earth"
9. "Afterglow"
10. "I Know What I Like (In Your Wardrobe)"
11. "Eleventh Earl of Mar"
12. "All in a Mouse's Night" (dropped after 23 January 1977)
13. "Supper's Ready"
14. "Dance on a Volcano"
15. Drum Duet / " Los Endos"

Encore

1. "The Lamb Lies Down on Broadway" / "The Musical Box" (closing section)
2. "The Knife" (performed on 18–22 May in São Paulo and 23–25 June in London)

== Tour dates ==
List of 1977 concerts
Date	City	Country	Venue
1 January 1977	London	England	Rainbow Theatre
2 January 1977	London	England	Rainbow Theatre
3 January 1977	London	England	Rainbow Theatre
7 January 1977	Birmingham	England	Birmingham Odeon
8 January 1977	Birmingham	England	Birmingham Odeon
9 January 1977; 2 Shows	Liverpool	England	Liverpool Empire Theatre
10 January 1977	Manchester	England	Free Trade Hall
11 January 1977	Manchester	England	Free Trade Hall
13 January 1977	Dundee	Scotland	Caird Hall
14 January 1977; 2 Shows	Edinburgh	Scotland	Edinburgh Playhouse
15 January 1977	Edinburgh	Scotland	Edinburgh Playhouse
16 January 1977	Newcastle upon Tyne	England	Newcastle City Hall
17 January 1977	Newcastle upon Tyne	England	Newcastle City Hall
19 January 1977	Southampton	England	Gaumont Theatre
20 January 1977	Southampton	England	Gaumont Theatre
21 January 1977	Leicester	England	De Montfort Hall
22 January 1977	Leicester	England	De Montfort Hall
23 January 1977	Bristol	England	Bristol Hippodrome
2 February 1977	Boulder	United States	Macky Auditorium
4 February 1977	Tulsa	United States	Tulsa Municipal Theater
5 February 1977	Kansas City	United States	Municipal Auditorium
6 February 1977	St. Louis	United States	Kiel Auditorium
8 February 1977	Minneapolis	United States	Orpheum Theatre
9 February 1977	Madison	United States	Dane County Coliseum
10 February 1977	Milwaukee	United States	Milwaukee Auditorium
12 February 1977	Detroit	United States	Detroit Masonic Temple
13 February 1977	Kalamazoo	United States	Wings Stadium
15 February 1977	Chicago	United States	Auditorium Theatre
16 February 1977	Chicago	United States	Auditorium Theatre
17 February 1977	Chicago	United States	Auditorium Theatre
19 February 1977	Winnipeg	Canada	Winnipeg Auditorium
20 February 1977	Kitchener	Canada	Kitchener Memorial Auditorium Complex
22 February 1977	New York City	United States	Madison Square Garden
23 February 1977	Boston	United States	Boston Garden
24 February 1977	Springfield	United States	Springfield Civic Center
25 February 1977	Hartford	United States	Bushnell Auditorium
26 February 1977	Syracuse	United States	Onondaga County War Memorial
27 February 1977	Richfield	United States	Richfield Coliseum
28 February 1977	Buffalo	United States	Buffalo Memorial Auditorium
2 March 1977	Montreal	Canada	Montreal Forum
3 March 1977	Quebec City	Canada	Colisée de Québec
5 March 1977	Ottawa	Canada	Ottawa Civic Centre
6 March 1977	Toronto	Canada	Maple Leaf Gardens
8 March 1977	Philadelphia	United States	The Spectrum
9 March 1977	Baltimore	United States	Baltimore Civic Center
10 March 1977	Pittsburgh	United States	Civic Arena
12 March 1977	Nashville	United States	Vanderbilt University
13 March 1977	Atlanta	United States	Fox Theatre
14 March 1977	Atlanta	United States	Fox Theatre
16 March 1977	New Orleans	United States	Municipal Auditorium
17 March 1977	Houston	United States	Sam Houston Coliseum
~~18 March 1977~~	~~Arlington~~	United States	~~Texas Hall~~
19 March 1977	Dallas	United States	Moody Coliseum
21 March 1977	Austin	United States	Municipal Auditorium
24 March 1977	Inglewood	United States	The Forum
25 March 1977	San Francisco	United States	Winterland Ballroom
26 March 1977	San Francisco	United States	Winterland Ballroom
27 March 1977	San Diego	United States	San Diego Sports Arena
29 March 1977	Phoenix	United States	Civic Plaza Assembly Hall
1 April 1977	Portland	United States	Paramount Theatre
2 April 1977	Vancouver	Canada	Pacific Coliseum
3 April 1977	Seattle	United States	Paramount Theatre
10 May 1977	Porto Alegre	Brazil	Ginásio Gigantinho
11 May 1977	Porto Alegre	Brazil	Ginásio Gigantinho
14 May 1977; 2 Shows	Rio de Janeiro	Brazil	Ginásio do Maracanãzinho
15 May 1977; 2 Shows	Rio de Janeiro	Brazil	Ginásio do Maracanãzinho
18 May 1977	São Paulo	Brazil	Anhembi Convention Center
19 May 1977	São Paulo	Brazil	Anhembi Convention Center
21 May 1977; 2 Shows	São Paulo	Brazil	Ginásio do Ibirapuera
22 May 1977; 2 Shows	São Paulo	Brazil	Ginásio do Ibirapuera
2 June 1977	Munich	West Germany	Olympiahalle
4 June 1977	Stockholm	Sweden	Johanneshovs Isstadion
6 June 1977	West Berlin	West Germany	Deutschlandhalle
7 June 1977	Stockholm	Sweden	Johanneshovs Isstadion
11 June 1977	Paris	France	Palais des Sports de Paris
12 June 1977	Paris	France	Palais des Sports de Paris
13 June 1977	Paris	France	Palais des Sports de Paris
14 June 1977	Paris	France	Palais des Sports de Paris
17 June 1977	Cologne	West Germany	Müngersdorfer Stadion
19 June 1977	Offenbach am Main	West Germany	Stadion am Bieberer Berg
20 June 1977	Bremen	West Germany	Stadthalle Bremen
23 June 1977	London	England	Earl's Court
24 June 1977	London	England	Earl's Court
25 June 1977	London	England	Earl's Court
28 June 1977; 2 Shows	Brussels	Belgium	Forest National
29 June 1977	Rotterdam	Netherlands	Sportpaleis
1 July 1977	Colmar	France	Théâtre du Parc des Expositions
2 July 1977	Zürich	Switzerland	Hallenstadion
3 July 1977	Munich	West Germany	Olympiahalle

== Box office score data ==
List of box office score data with date, city, venue, attendance, gross, references
Date (1977)	City	Venue	Attendance	Gross	Ref(s)
2 February	Boulder, United States	Macky Auditorium	2,068	$13,131	
4 February	Tulsa, United States	Tulsa Municipal Theater	2,077	$13,042	
5 February	Kansas City, United States	Municipal Auditorium	5,669	$34,014	
6 February	St. Louis, United States	Kiel Auditorium	6,540	$42,478	
26 February	Syracuse, United States	Onondaga County War Memorial	6,574	$41,030	
24 March	Inglewood, United States	The Forum	13,524	$108,583	
25 March	San Francisco, United States	Winterland Ballroom	9,927	$56,707	
26 March	San Francisco, United States	Winterland Ballroom	9,927	$56,707	
3 April	Seattle, United States	Paramount Theatre	2,779	$17,209	

== Personnel ==
Genesis

- Phil Collins – lead vocals, percussion, drums
- Tony Banks – Hammond T-102 organ, Mellotron M-400, RMI 368x Electra Piano and Harpsichord; ARP Pro Soloist synthesizer, 12-string guitar, backing vocals
- Steve Hackett – electric guitar, 12-string guitar
- Mike Rutherford – bass, Moog Taurus bass pedals, 12-string & electric guitars, backing vocals

with

- Chester Thompson – drums, percussion
