= Many Too Many =

Single by Genesis

from the album ...And Then There Were Three...
- B-side: "The Day the Light Went Out"; "Vancouver"
- Released: 16 June 1978
- Length: 3:31
- Label: Charisma/Phonogram (UK); Atlantic (U.S.)
- Songwriter: Tony Banks
- Producers: David Hentschel and Genesis

Genesis singles chronology
"Follow You Follow Me" (1978)	"Many Too Many" (1978)	"Deep in the Motherlode" (1978)

Audio sample
- "Many Too Many": file; help

"Many Too Many" is a love song recorded by English rock band Genesis.

== Background ==
"Many Too Many" was released as a single from the album ...And Then There Were Three... in 1978 and written by the band's keyboardist, Tony Banks, who described it as "a simple love lyric". The single reached No. 43 on the UK Singles Chart, following the band's successful breakthrough into the Top Ten with "Follow You Follow Me". Its B-side had two non-album songs, "Vancouver" and "The Day the Light Went Out", both released on compact disc on the Genesis Archive 2: 1976–1992 box set. An official music video was filmed for the song.

== Track listing ==
No.	Title	Writer(s)	Length
1.	"Many Too Many"	Tony Banks	3:31
2.	"The Day the Light Went Out"	Banks	3:14
3.	"Vancouver"	Phil Collins, Mike Rutherford	3:00

== Personnel ==
- Phil Collins – vocals, drums
- Tony Banks – piano, Mellotron, Roland RS-202
- Mike Rutherford – electric guitar, bass guitar

== Chart performance ==
Chart (1978)	Peak position
Germany (GfK)	41
UK Singles (OCC)	43
