= Deep in the Motherlode =

Single by Genesis

from the album ...And Then There Were Three...
- B-side: "Scenes from a Night's Dream"
- Released: July 1978 (US)
- Recorded: September – October 1977
- Genre: Progressive rock; art rock
- Length: 5:15 (album version); 3:35 (U.S. single edit)
- Label: Atlantic Records (US)
- Songwriter: Mike Rutherford
- Producers: David Hentschel and Genesis

Genesis singles chronology
"Many Too Many" (1978)	"Deep in the Motherlode" (1978)	"Turn It On Again" (1980)

Audio sample
- "Deep in the Motherlode": file; help

"Deep in the Motherlode", also titled "Go West Young Man (In the Motherlode)", is a song performed and recorded by English rock band Genesis, with lyrics and music by Mike Rutherford. It was released as the sixth track on the group's 1978 album ...And Then There Were Three... under the title "Deep in the Motherlode".

The song tells a fictional story of a man's travels during the Nevada gold rush and his family's urging for him to get as much gold as he can.

A mother lode is a rich vein of valuable metal in a mine. The lyric "Go West, young man" is a reference to a famous phrase by Horace Greeley, who, in a 13 July 1865 editorial, advised: "Go West, young man, go West and grow up with the country."

The song was performed live by Genesis on their 1978 tour and was used as a frequent opening number on their 1980 tour, but the song was not performed live thereafter. In Japan and North America it was released as a single, but re-titled as "Go West Young Man (In the Motherlode)".
