= Spot the Pigeon =

EP by Genesis
- Released: 20 May 1977
- Recorded: September–October 1976
- Studios: Relight (Hilvarenbeek, Netherlands)
- Genres: Progressive rock; art rock; pop rock
- Length: 13:22
- Label: Charisma
- Producers: David Hentschel; Genesis

Genesis chronology
Wind & Wuthering (1976)	Spot the Pigeon (1977)	Seconds Out (1977)

Genesis EP chronology
Spot the Pigeon (1977)	3×3 (1982)

Spot the Pigeon is the first EP by the English progressive rock band Genesis, released on 20 May 1977. Its three songs were originally written for the group's eighth studio album, Wind & Wuthering (1976), but were not included in its final track selection. It was the final studio release to feature guitarist Steve Hackett prior to his departure from Genesis.

Spot the Pigeon was not released in the United States, where there was a weak market for EPs. However, a Canadian release was issued by Atlantic Records (the band's overseas distributor) and was imported into the US; it was easily available at shops that sold imports. Spot the Pigeon reached No. 14 on the UK singles chart. It was released on CD in 1988 but has not been reissued since; "Pigeons" and "Inside and Out" were included in the Genesis Archive 2: 1976–1992 (2000) and Turn It On Again: The Hits – The Tour Edition (2007) sets, and "Match of the Day" on Genesis 1976–1982 (2007) and on the label sampler Refugees: A Charisma Records Anthology 1969–1978 (2009).

== Background ==
The title is a variation on the football-themed spot the ball (the cover resembles a spot the ball competition photo), replacing the word "ball" with "pigeon" so that the title links the themes of the first two songs. The EP title is also a reference to "Stop the Pigeon", the theme song to Dastardly and Muttley, a children's cartoon programme popular in the UK in the 1970s.

Drummer/singer Phil Collins expressed his disdain for "Match of the Day" in 2004, saying: "It was also not our finest hour looking back at it now. I wrote the embarrassing lyrics and the track featured an attempt to bring some of the hipper grooves of the day into Genesis, with very suspect results."

The lightweight "Pigeons" is driven by a one-note banjolele line that parodies English musician George Formby. Steve Hackett commented in 2009 that "the thing about ‘Pigeons’ was that it was possible for the band to play a whole note for a whole thing: ding-ding-ding-ding. And that was unvarying whilst the keyboard changed and [Banks] tried to do as many different chords as possible."

According to bassist/guitarist Mike Rutherford, the band felt that the omission of both songs from the Wind & Wuthering LP (released in December 1976) was detrimental, which led to attempts at making songs with shorter lengths on their next album, ...And Then There Were Three....

"Inside and Out" combines images of folk and progressive pop for what would be the last time in the band's career with Hackett as an active member. After its 1977 release, Hackett remained adamant that the song exemplified the band's multi-layered sound and ought to have been included on Wind & Wuthering. "I think it is one of the stronger tracks that didn't make it onto the album," he told Vintage Rock in 2017. "I think it should have been because it has a very beautiful sound to it. Right from the word ‘go,’ it's got that Genesis multi-jangle thing where it sounds like one guitar, but it's a whole bunch of guitars all playing the same thing." In the same year, he celebrated the fortieth anniversary of Wind & Wuthering by playing a selection of its songs on tour, including "Inside and Out" (documented on his live album Wuthering Nights: Live in Birmingham). Genesis had performed the song several times on the Wind & Wuthering tour in 1977. The first section, "Inside", concerns a man who is wrongfully imprisoned for rape. The second section "Out", is an instrumental passage that represents the man's freedom.

== Critical reception ==
Professional ratings
Review scores
Source	Rating
AllMusic	3/5 stars

AllMusic's retrospective review praised the songwriting on the EP for returning to the sound of early Genesis album Trespass, but concluded its review thus: "Spot the Pigeon has never been a popular or even very accessible release in the U.S. Of course, there's a reason for this: It simply isn't very exciting."

== Reissues ==
The EP was reissued on vinyl for Record Store Day 2012 by Audio Fidelity, again on blue vinyl, playing at 33 1/3 rpm on Side A and 45 rpm on Side B.

== Track listing ==
Side One
No.	Title	Writer(s)	Length
1.	"Match of the Day"	Banks, Collins, Rutherford	3:24
2.	"Pigeons"	Banks, Collins, Rutherford	3:12

Side two
No.	Title	Writer(s)	Length
1.	"Inside and Out"	Banks, Collins, Hackett, Rutherford	6:45

== Personnel ==
Genesis

- Tony Banks – keyboards
- Phil Collins – drums, percussion, vocals
- Steve Hackett – guitars
- Mike Rutherford – guitars, bass guitar
