= ...And Then There Were Three... =

... And Then There Were Three...

Studio album by Genesis
- Released: 31 March 1978
- Recorded: September–October 1977
- Studios: Relight (Hilvarenbeek, Netherlands)
- Genres: Progressive rock; art rock; pop rock
- Length: 53:35
- Labels: Charisma; Atlantic
- Producers: David Hentschel; Genesis

Genesis chronology
Seconds Out (1977)	... And Then There Were Three... (1978)	Duke (1980)

Singles from ...And Then There Were Three...
- 1. "Follow You Follow Me" Released: 24 February 1978; 2. "Many Too Many" Released: 16 June 1978; 3. "Deep in the Motherlode" Released: July 1978

...And Then There Were Three... (stylised in all lowercase) is the ninth studio album by the English rock band Genesis. It was released on 31 March 1978 by Charisma Records in the UK and by Atlantic Records in the US. The album marks a major turning point in the band's history, following the departure of guitarist Steve Hackett. This reduced the line-up to a core trio of drummer and vocalist Phil Collins, keyboardist Tony Banks, and bassist/guitarist Mike Rutherford. Faced with the loss of a primary songwriter, the remaining members deliberately shifted away from the sprawling, epic progressive rock structures that defined their previous work, opting instead for shorter, tighter, and more direct song formats.

The album was recorded in the Netherlands and mixed at Trident Studios in London, under the direction of the band and producer David Hentschel. With Hackett gone, Rutherford took on all studio guitar duties, which significantly simplified the group's arrangements. The new songwriting approach yielded the band's first major global hit single, "Follow You Follow Me", which became their highest charting at that point, reaching No. 7 in the UK and No. 23 in the US. The single broadened their demographic appeal and helped bridge the gap between their traditional fan base and mainstream pop audiences.

Upon release, ...And Then There Were Three... received mixed reviews from critics. Traditionalists lamented the loss of complex progressive textures, while others praised the group's newfound pop accessibility. Despite the critical divide, the album achieved substantial commercial success, peaking at No. 3 in the UK and became the band's highest-charting album in the US at the time, reaching No. 14 and earning a platinum certification for selling one million copies. The subsequent 1978 world tour was their first with live guitarist Daryl Stuermer, and cemented their status as a major arena act, establishing the commercial blueprint that would define their massive stadium success throughout the 1980s. The album was reissued in 2007 with a new stereo and 5.1 surround sound mix and bonus material as part of the Genesis 1976–1982 box set.

== Production ==
=== Background ===
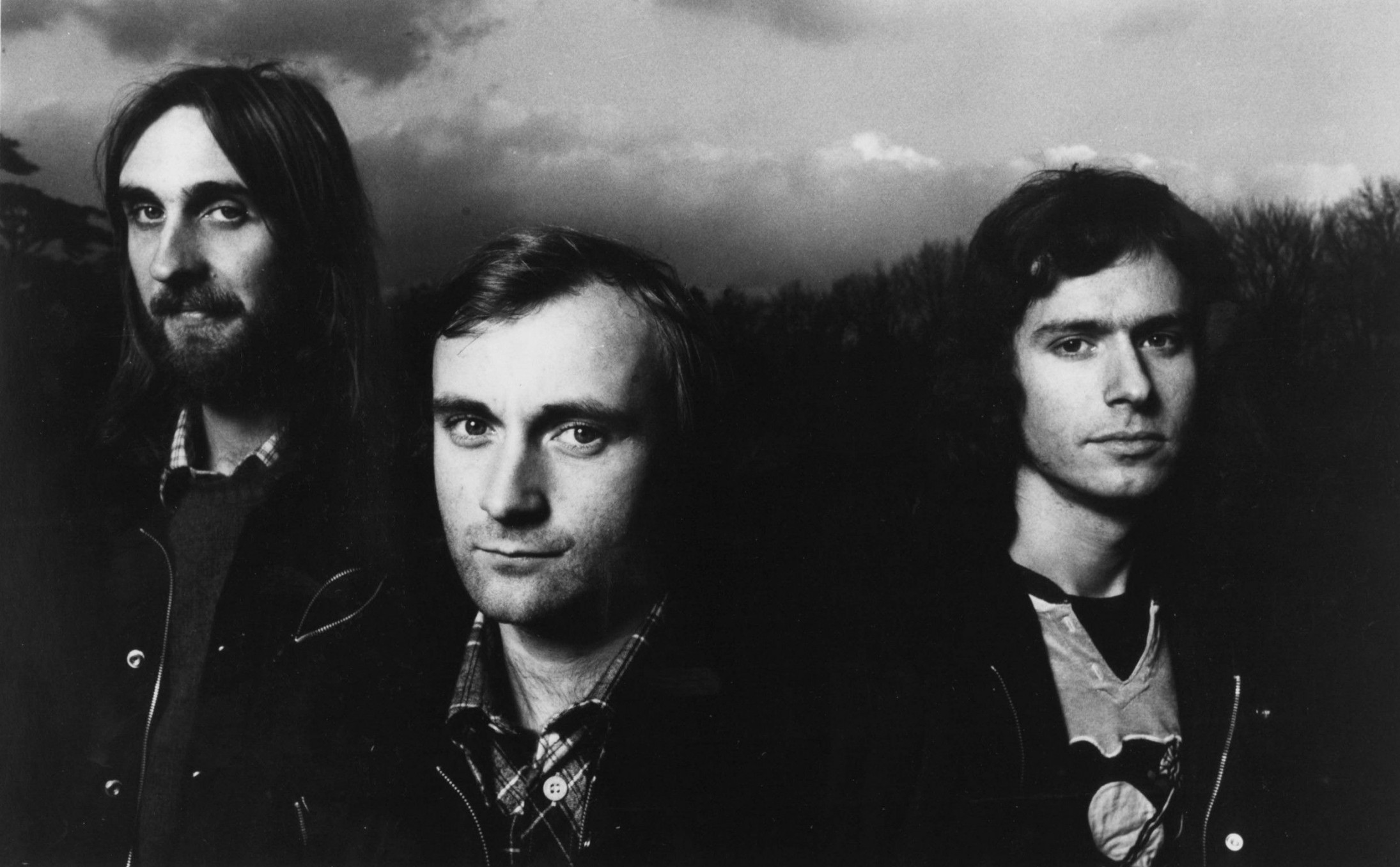
Genesis in 1978, after guitarist Steve Hackett's departure. From left: Mike Rutherford, Phil Collins, and Tony Banks. This lineup would become the band's longest-lasting and most commercially successful.

In July 1977, the Genesis line-up of drummer and vocalist Phil Collins, keyboardist Tony Banks, bassist Mike Rutherford, guitarist Steve Hackett, and touring drummer Chester Thompson completed their tour in support of their eighth studio album, Wind & Wuthering. The band proceeded to edit and mix their second live album, Seconds Out, in August 1977, during which time Hackett left the band to pursue a solo career. Already having released one solo album in 1975, Voyage of the Acolyte, Hackett had become increasingly frustrated by the band's lack of interest in his ideas. Further, since Genesis had recently performed at Madison Square Garden, Hackett felt the group had reached its pinnacle and thus he had no reason to continue performing with them. His departure was not made public until 8 October, when Collins, Banks, and Rutherford were promoting Seconds Out. The trio were confident they could carry on, as they had formed the backbone of several Genesis classics, including the "Apocalypse in 9/8" section of "Supper's Ready", the instrumental part of "The Cinema Show" and the basics of A Trick of the Tail (written while Hackett was working on his first solo album). They also agreed not to hire a replacement for Hackett, choosing instead to perform all instrumental work on their albums themselves going forward.

=== Writing and recording ===
Rehearsals began at Shepperton Studios and lasted for around six weeks. In September 1977, the remaining three members returned to Relight Studios in Hilvarenbeek, Netherlands to write and record their new album, the same venue as used for the Wind & Wuthering album. The group wished to record in a new location, but they could not find a studio that fit their needs and did not wish to travel too far from England. Rutherford wished to remain in London, but noted recording abroad was their "one tax concession". Joining the group was audio engineer and co-producer David Hentschel who had worked on the band's past two albums. Genesis also shared production duties and are credited on the album's sleeve. According to Rutherford, the material was recorded in two weeks. The band considered auditioning for a new guitarist or utilising a studio guitarist for the album, but Rutherford felt confident enough in his skills to take on the lead guitar parts himself, feeling he would enjoy the challenge of doing so. Banks noticed recording as a three-member band was an easier and more pleasurable experience than before as each member had a clearly defined role, which reduced the risk of personnel clashes along the way. Rutherford became aware that with three members, the basic tracks came across as sparse and not so easy to understand until the overdubs were recorded on top of them. Following the recording, the group mixed the album at Trident Studios in London.

Banks (four songs) and Rutherford (three songs) remained the dominant songwriters, with the remaining songs being one from Banks and Collins, and three tracks written by all three members. Collins had settled down with his wife and two children in South Ealing, and did not find much time to bring new songs to the sessions. Rutherford later said he was impressed the group wrote "Follow You Follow Me", as they had had difficulty in the past writing songs that worked within a four minute framework. The majority of the album was formed of pre-written songs, not ones developed from jams and improvisations. Collins later thought the album lacked "rich, jazzy pieces" like "Los Endos" from A Trick of the Tail with its merging of rhythm and melody, but he could not contribute such ideas as it was difficult to play the drums in his flat in Ealing with his wife and two children. The group were still growing in popularity in the United States and despite "Follow You, Follow Me", did not have a hit single, which Banks later admitted was a struggling point for them. The original album track order swapped "Undertow" with "Many Too Many" and "Scenes from a Night's Dream", before it was changed as the band felt it flowed better.

=== Sleeve design ===
As with their past three studio albums, the album cover and packaging was designed by Storm Thorgerson and Aubrey Powell of Hipgnosis. Thorgerson later said the cover was "trying to tell a story by the traces left by the light trails". Models were used for the cover shot, not the members of the band. The photograph was shot using time-lapse to represent the "comings and goings" in the album's lyrics, and over the change in personnel.

== Writing ==
The album marked a change in the band's sound, moving from their progressive rock roots towards shorter, more concise songs. The motivation for this was to enable more musical ideas to be put on a single album, and to act as a response to the newly emerging punk rock and new wave scenes, where short and concise songs were standard. Collins recognised how this decision gave the impression that Genesis was aiming to become "a singles band" that prioritised commercial success over artistic credibility, but maintained that the new material remained "fundamentally the same". Rutherford in particular wanted to forge his own style and not copy Hackett's distinctive guitar tones, so the album was more dominated by Banks' keyboards, with sparser and simpler guitar parts.

=== Side one ===
"Down and Out", one of the three tracks written collectively, was created during the band's rehearsals. Thompson found its more complex time signature difficult to reproduce on stage at first as Collins could not explain the riff and rhythm which Rutherford noted merely "added to the confusion". Collins wrote the lyrics, which concern American record labels who drop artists when they are no longer in fashion; the chorus is spoken from the artists's view and the verses from the label.

The band had originally planned to develop and arrange Banks's song "Undertow" further, but its basic track of guitar, drums and piano, coupled with its simple chorus, was strong enough to remain intact. Banks plays a Yamaha electric grand piano on the track which also incorporates voice loops made by the band that were kept "low-key and subtle" in the final mix. Banks had written a two-minute introduction to the song, but recalled disagreement from the other members as there were enough keyboard parts on the album. The unused section was reworked and later used as the theme for the film "The Shout" and released as "From The Undertow", the opening track on Banks's first solo album A Curious Feeling (1979).

The lyrics to "Ballad of Big" were written by Collins. The introduction contains a wobbly guitar effect created by Rutherford whereby he rubbed his guitar strings with pieces of metal, giving it a "slightly Eastern strain". The end of the track has Banks and himself duelling between the Yamaha electric piano and his Roland guitar synthesiser.

For "Snowbound", Collins originally recorded his drum part at a considerably faster pace before the group decided to slow it down in order to fit the style of the song. Collins and Rutherford described it as a romantic song, with its lyrics about a man who wears a snowman outfit to hide from people but while inside, becomes paranoid and finds he cannot get out.

While Banks was writing "Burning Rope", he decided to shorten the track rather than stretch its arrangements into an extended piece as he wished to avoid repeating himself and drawing comparisons to his ten-minute "One for the Vine" from Wind & Wuthering. It features a lead guitar solo that Rutherford found was a challenge to produce in the wake of Hackett's departure; he was pleased with the final result and called it his best on the album.

=== Side two ===
The original title to "Deep in the Motherlode" was "Heavy". Rutherford uses a bottleneck slide guitar which he was inexperienced with at first to the point of placing it "on the wrong hand".

"Many Too Many" features more lead guitar work from Rutherford. Once the basic tracks had been recorded, the group were unsure on how to finish the song and sought more instrumental parts to complete it, including a string sound Banks played on a Polymoog. At one point, they considered using orchestral instruments for the track but that idea was never attempted. Banks, who penned the song's lyrics, recalled an issue Collins had with singing the word "mama" in the chorus; Banks had to reassure him that he could sing it. Banks also said in an interview that he actually played the string part on the Mellotron (its last appearance on a Genesis album) and a Roland string synth, as he felt "the basic string sound on the Polymoog isn't that great a string imitation".

"Scenes From a Night's Dream" is based on a childhood dream, itself inspired by the cartoon strip character Little Nemo; that character was part of a book that Collins had previously bought for his brother. The song developed from a musical idea from Banks who wrote the first draft of its lyrics, but he gave up halfway through as he felt they were unsuitable. The band instead settled on a set of lyrics that Collins offered during down time while mixing at Trident Studios that brought in a different melody and more harmonies.

"Say It's Alright Joe", written by Rutherford and the penultimate track recorded for the album, is a torch song about an alcoholic who goes into a drunken stupor. The guitarist intended the track to be a "piss-take on the Dean Martin 'set 'em up Joe' alcoholic style'", but thought it was not going to work until Banks added his keyboard overdubs and the band started mixing the track, at which point it "came to life".

The introduction to "The Lady Lies" was meant to have a "strippers feel to it. Hence the title". The lyrics tell the story of a man who rescues a woman from the mouth of a monster, but is later seduced by the woman who the lyricist knows is a demon, luring him into an unknown fate. The song was performed often during the band's 1978 and 1980 tours. Phil would often coach the audience on when to cheer and boo in response to the song's characters and their actions. Daryl Stuermer would play an extended guitar solo in the outro.

Genesis deliberately planned to close the album on a "lighter note" as a contrast to the heavier tracks on the record, so they placed "Follow You Follow Me" at the end. This was the only track on the album that had been written during the rehearsal stage, and went through numerous iterations before the group settled on the three-minute arrangement for the song. Hentschel was dismissive of the song, but prepared an initial mix and presented it to the staff at Atlantic Records, who recognised it as a potential hit single for the band. The song was remixed and included on the album. The lyrics were written by Rutherford and were inspired by his wife. He later said it was the easiest set of lyrics he had written, spending "about ten minutes" on it.

== Release ==
...And Then There Were Three... was released in the UK on 31 March 1978 and in the US on 28 March on Atlantic Records. It reached No. 3 on the UK Albums Chart during a 32-week stay on the chart and No. 14 on the US Billboard 200. The album continued to sell, and was certified gold by the Recording Industry Association of America on 31 May 1978 for 500,000 copies sold in the US. It reached platinum status on 11 February 1988 for selling one million copies. The album was considered a commercial breakthrough for Genesis, as it brought in sufficiently large audiences to be able to make a profit from touring, which before then had always run at a loss.

Genesis released two singles from ...And Then There Were Three.... The lead single, "Follow You Follow Me", became their most successful since their formation, peaking at No. 7 in the UK.

A digitally remastered version was released on CD in 1994 on Virgin in Europe and Atlantic in the US and Canada. A SACD / DVD double disc set (including new 5.1 and Stereo mixes) was released on 2 April 2007. It was released in the US and Canada as part of the Genesis 1976–1982 box set. This includes the album in remixed stereo and surround sound, and includes related video tracks. The only track not remixed is "Say It's Alright Joe", because the band was unable to locate the multitrack recordings.

== Critical reception ==
Retrospective professional reviews
Review scores
Source	Rating
AllMusic	3.5/5 stars
Christgau's Record Guide	D+
MusicHound Rock	1.5/5 stars
Q	3/5 stars
The Rolling Stone Album Guide	4/5 stars

In an April 1978 review for Melody Maker, reporter Chris Welch praised the album as "strong, confident" that is "as good as any they have made in the band's post-Gabriel years". Welch noted the songs have "a sense of purpose" and come with "a remarkably powerful sound", and picked "Ballad Of Big" as his favourite track. A review in The Town Talk praised the group for filling the gap Hackett left "confidently" and picks "Down And Out" as claim of their survival. The rest of the album is "a tapestry of imaginary landscapes filled with the struggling mythic heroes that Genesis has learned to depict so well". Gary Mullinax for The Morning News thought the album sounded little different to Wind & Wuthering and noted the dominance of Banks's keyboards over Rutherford's guitars, with "the same dreamy wall-of-sound music with the same high-pitched vocals" from Collins. He concluded that Genesis succeed at points on the album but thought many songs on it fail to go anywhere, "blending into one another like some sort of hip musak". Charley Walters, writing in Circus, said that despite the exits of Gabriel and Hackett, Genesis have sacrificed "neither direction nor quality". The album, he thought, has "hard, almost ominous" tracks like "Down And Out" and "softer, more melodic" ones like "Say It's Alright Joe", all of which create "a magical, mystical sound that sets them apart from the numerous similar but usually inferior European art-rock ensembles". He names Banks as the one of the trio most responsible for their sound with his "rich" arrangements complemented by Rutherford's restrained guitar work which is "more felt than heard" which worked well to his praise on "Burning Rope". Walters, however, thought Collins's vocals has shortcomings that lacks expansion or breathtaking moments, though is a drummer who can still be melodic. The Globe and Mail opined that "the songs still sound like Tennyson set to music, but it's all done with precision and there isn't a sound which is not beautiful, fat, ornate and quite lush".

Other reviewers were more critical of the album, including Jon Pareles and Village Voice critic Robert Christgau, who said that "without lead guitarist Steve Hackett, the band loses its last remaining focal point; the rest is double-tracking. Hence a sound as mushy as the dread Moody Blues, with fewer excuses." In Crawdaddy, Michael Bloom found Banks's arrangements and keyboard sounds poor, saying the melodies tend to "practically vanish" and "slip through your fingers". He also declared Rutherford's lead guitar playing "unbearably clumsy" compared to Hackett but acknowledged that Rutherford remains a "rare bassist" and his 12-string guitar playing reminded the reviewer of Trespass (1970) and the surrounding period in the band's history. Bloom picked out "The Lady Lies" as Banks's strongest contribution both musically and lyrically, comparing the composition and lyrical message to "One For The Vine" on Wind & Wuthering, and also highlighted "Deep In The Motherlode" as a strong track, but found Collins's singing "uniformly insipid" and concluded that the album is "less of a disappointment than an interminable frustration". In his review for Rolling Stone, he panned Hackett's then-current album Please Don't Touch!, but also said that his ex-band fared even worse, concluding that "this contemptible opus is but the palest shadow of the group's earlier accomplishments."

Retrospective appraisals have also been mixed. In The Rolling Stone Album Guide, J. D. Considine deemed it "a genuine pop breakthrough" that "does hone the playing so that there's less empty flash and wasted energy", while MusicHound Rock (1996) said it "put Genesis on the radio with 'Follow You, Follow Me' but lacked the meaty songcraft and ambitious arrangements of its predecessors".

== Tour ==
Genesis' touring lineup for the album, with drummer Chester Thompson (left) and guitarist Daryl Stuermer (middle right).

Genesis embarked on a supporting tour for the album between March and December 1978, including nearly 100 shows covering Europe, the US and Japan, with only a single UK show at Knebworth Park on 24 June. The US dates were important as they would allow the band to recoup touring costs, which were running at around $25,000 a day.

The group needed an additional touring member to cover all the material, but Rutherford only wanted to play lead guitar on the new songs from ...And Then There Were Three... and return to bass and twelve-string for everything else. The successful applicant would have to play bass on the new material and cover Hackett's old lead parts. They first approached Weather Report's Alphonso Johnson, but he was primarily a bassist and his style did not fit in with the rest of the band. Johnson suggested instead that they consider jazz-fusion guitarist Daryl Stuermer, who was already a Genesis fan. He tried out an audition in New York, playing bass on "Down And Out" and lead guitar on "Squonk" from 1976's A Trick of the Tail and was immediately hired. "The Fountain of Salmacis", the closing track from 1971's Nursery Cryme was reintroduced into the live set, so Stuermer could take a song with a distinctive Hackett solo and put his own stamp on it. "Say It's Alright Joe" was performed with Collins in character wearing a raincoat and using Banks' keyboards as a makeshift bar.

The tour had several breaks so the band could have time with their family at home. Collins later said the tour was "an end of an era" and thought the group did not need to play live as much in the future. The tour was a major factor in Collins' divorce from his first wife, as she felt he was away from home too often and needed support at home. A row with his wife cancelled plans for her and their children to join Collins on the Japanese leg, and Collins recalled: "I went to Japan, and spent ten days drunk. I hated every minute of it. I couldn't sing and everyone was concerned about my welfare although there was nothing anyone could do about it."

== Track listing ==
All songs arranged and performed by Genesis.

Side one
No.	Title	Writer(s)	Length
1.	"Down and Out"	Collins, Banks, Rutherford	5:28
2.	"Undertow"	Banks	4:47
3.	"Ballad of Big"	Collins, Banks, Rutherford	4:51
4.	"Snowbound"	Rutherford	4:31
5.	"Burning Rope"	Banks	7:10
Total length:			26:47

Side two
No.	Title	Writer(s)	Length
1.	"Deep in the Motherlode"	Rutherford	5:16
2.	"Many Too Many"	Banks	3:32
3.	"Scenes from a Night's Dream"	Collins, Banks	3:30
4.	"Say It's Alright Joe"	Rutherford	4:21
5.	"The Lady Lies"	Banks	6:08
6.	"Follow You Follow Me"	Rutherford, Collins, Banks	4:01
Total length:			26:48

=== Additional tracks ===
Additional songs recorded during the ...And Then There Were Three... sessions

Title	Source
"The Day the Light Went Out"	B-side to "Many Too Many"
"Vancouver"	B-side to "Many Too Many"

== Personnel ==
Credits are adapted from the album's 1978 and 2007 liner notes.

Genesis

- Tony Banks – keyboards
- Phil Collins – drums, vocals
- Mike Rutherford – basses, guitars, ARP Avatar & Roland GR-500 guitar synthesizers

Production

- Genesis – production
- David Hentschel – production, engineer
- Pierre Geofroy Chateau – production assistant
- Steve Short – mixing assistant
- Geoff Banks – equipment
- Andy Mackrill – equipment
- Dale Newman – equipment
- Hipgnosis – sleeve design, photographs

== Charts ==
=== Weekly charts ===
Chart (1978)	Peak position
Australian Albums (Kent Music Report)	12
Austrian Albums (Ö3 Austria)	17
Canada Top Albums/CDs (RPM)	11
Finnish Albums (The Official Finnish Charts)	25
French Albums (SNEP)	2
Dutch Albums (Album Top 100)	8
German Albums (Offizielle Top 100)	2
Italian Albums (Musica e dischi)	6
Japanese Albums (Oricon)	75
Swedish Albums (Sverigetopplistan)	22
New Zealand Albums (RMNZ)	10
Norwegian Albums (VG-lista)	7
Swedish Albums (Sverigetopplistan)	22
UK Albums (Official Charts)	3
US Billboard 200	14

Chart (2014–24)	Peak position
Hungarian Physical Albums (MAHASZ)	14
UK Rock & Metal Albums (Official Charts)	23

=== Year-end charts ===
Chart (1978)	Position
Canada Top Albums/CDs (RPM)	85
Dutch Albums (Album Top 100)	36
German Albums (Offizielle Top 100)	4
US Billboard 200	59

== Certifications ==
Region	Certification	Certified units/sales
Canada (Music Canada)	Gold	50,000^{^}
France (SNEP)	Gold	100,000^{*}
Germany (BVMI)	Gold	250,000^{^}
Japan (RIAJ)	Gold	100,000^{^}
Netherlands (NVPI)	Gold	50,000^{^}
United Kingdom (BPI)	Gold	100,000^{^}
United States (RIAA)	Platinum	1,000,000^{^}
^{*} Sales figures based on certification alone.^{^} Shipments figures based on certification alone.
