= Seconds Out =

Live album by Genesis
- Released: 14 October 1977
- Recorded: 9 July 1976 at Apollo, Glasgow ("The Cinema Show"); 21 January 1977 at De Montfort Hall, Leicester ("The Carpet Crawlers"); 12–14 June 1977 at Palais des Sports, Paris
- Genre: Progressive rock
- Length: 95:31
- Labels: Charisma, Atlantic
- Producers: David Hentschel; Genesis

Genesis chronology
Spot the Pigeon (1977)	Seconds Out (1977)	...And Then There Were Three... (1978)

Seconds Out is the second live album by the English progressive rock band Genesis. It was released as a double album on 14 October 1977 on Charisma Records, and was their first with touring drummer Chester Thompson and their last with guitarist Steve Hackett. The majority was recorded in June 1977 at the Palais des Sports in Paris during the Wind & Wuthering Tour. One track, "The Cinema Show", was recorded in 1976 at the Apollo in Glasgow during their A Trick of the Tail Tour.

Seconds Out received average to positive reviews upon its release, and reached No. 4 in the UK and No. 47 in the US. Hackett left the group to pursue a solo career while the album was being mixed, reducing Genesis to a core trio of keyboardist Tony Banks, guitarist/bassist Mike Rutherford, and drummer and singer Phil Collins. Seconds Out was reissued in 1994 and 2009, the latter as part of the Genesis Live 1973–2007 box set.

== Background ==
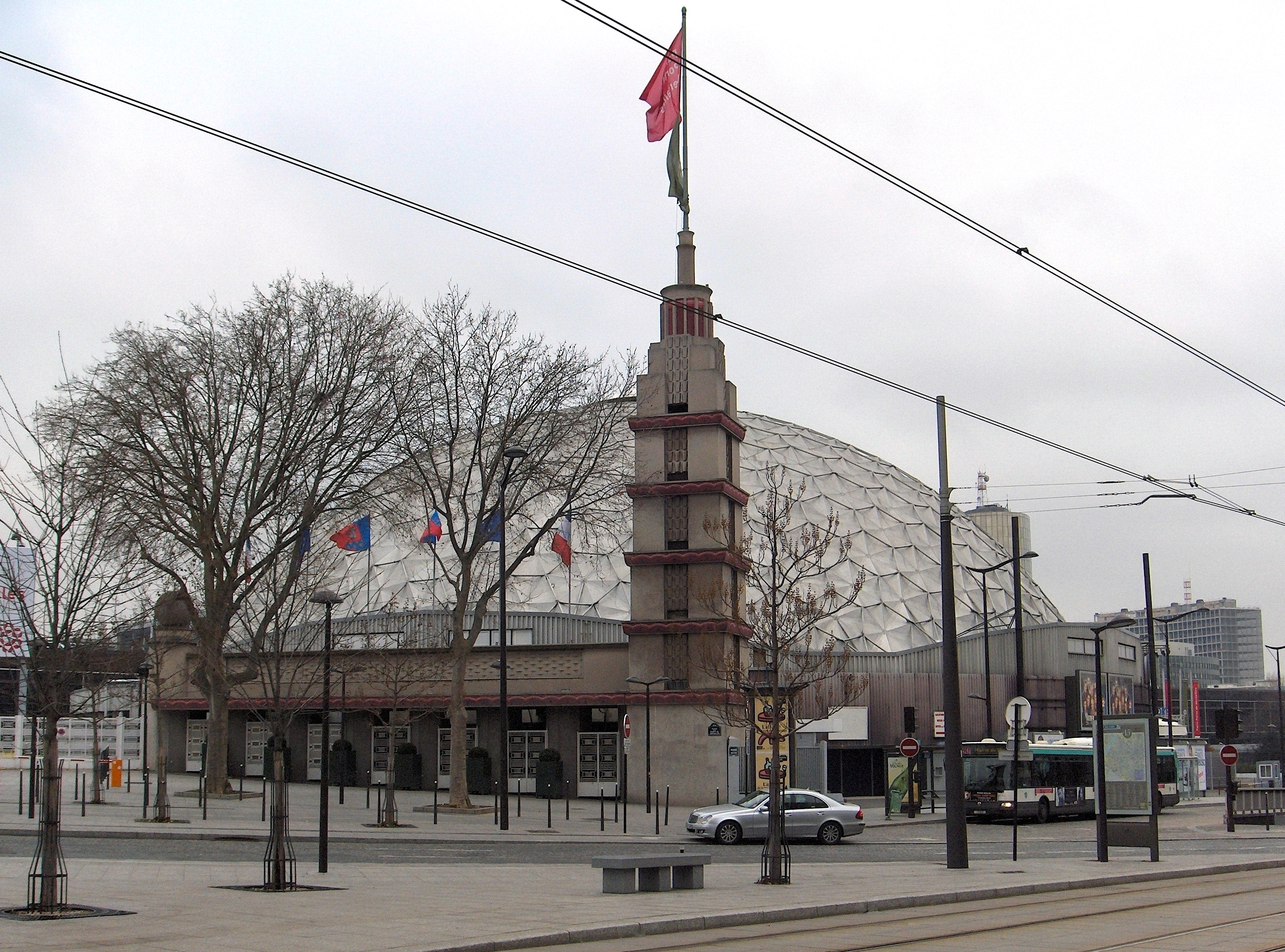
Most of the album was recorded at the Palais des Sports

In July 1977, the Genesis line-up of lead singer and drummer Phil Collins, keyboardist Tony Banks, bassist Mike Rutherford, guitarist Steve Hackett, and touring drummer Chester Thompson finished a seven-month tour supporting Wind & Wuthering (1976). For their next step, the group began the process of selecting live recordings that they had assembled in 1976 and 1977 for an official release and their first since Genesis Live (1973).

Seconds Out is compiled mostly from the band's five dates at the Palais des Sports in Paris between 12–14 June 1977 (two shows were performed on 12 June). Collins said the group considered the recordings made that year were superior in quality than the ones taken a year prior, and that his singing and Banks's keyboards sounded better compared to the previous tour. The run of shows in Paris allowed the band to spend more time on getting their performance and quality of the recordings right. One track, "The Carpet Crawlers" was recorded at De Montfort Hall in Leicester on 21 January 1977 and "The Cinema Show" was recorded at the Apollo in Glasgow on 9 July 1976 during the A Trick of the Tail Tour which featured Bill Bruford on drums. Many songs have overdubbed vocals that Phil Collins recorded in a studio prior to the album's release, including all of "The Carpet Crawlers", "Firth of Fifth", "The Lamb Lies Down on Broadway" and "The Cinema Show" and parts of "Squonk", "I Know What I Like (In Your Wardrobe)" and "Supper's Ready".

Mixes of "Firth of Fifth", Los Endos", "I Know What I Like (In Your Wardrobe)", and "White Mountain" from 1976 were produced, but scrapped. The band recorded performances of "Inside and Out" (from the EP Spot the Pigeon), but were unable to get the song to sound as good as the studio version. "I Know What I Like" contains snippets of the 1953 song "I Love Paris" as well as "Stagnation", "Visions of Angels", "Blood on the Rooftops" and "Dancing with the Moonlit Knight".

=== Hackett's departure ===
When Seconds Out was announced in the press on 8 October 1977, the news coincided with Hackett's departure from Genesis. He had announced his decision to the group two months earlier while cuts for the album were selected and mixed. Collins recalled spotting Hackett on the street while on his way to the studio and offered him a lift, but Hackett declined. Collins found out from Banks and Rutherford that Hackett had quit. Hackett later said that if he had got in the car, Collins would have been the one person to make him reconsider.

== Release ==
Seconds Out was released on 14 October 1977. Charisma Records organised an extensive promotional campaign for the album that included double page spreads in newspapers, window displays, colour posters, and commercials on national radio. In the US, the album was released by Atlantic Records. It peaked at No. 4 on the UK Albums Chart and No. 47 on the US Billboard 200.

== Reception ==
Professional ratings
Review scores
Source	Rating
AllMusic	3.5/5 stars
Rolling Stone	(average)
The Rolling Stone Album Guide	3/5 stars
Sounds	5/5 stars

Hugh Fielder of Sounds gave the album five stars out of five. Melody Maker reporter Chris Welch, with assistance from Bob Gallagher, also praised the album. Rolling Stone praised the contemporary incarnation of the band, noting they had "less reliance on theatrics" than before Peter Gabriel's departure, "and an added dollop of jazz-rock inclinations".

In their retrospective review, AllMusic wrote that Genesis's renderings of songs from A Trick of the Tail and Wind & Wuthering surpass the studio recordings, with "superb vocals by Collins throughout," and drumming by Chester Thompson, which they described as "at least a match for Collins' best playing." They considered the tracks from earlier albums to be weaker, however, finding Collins "...can't match the subtlety or expressiveness of Gabriel's singing, though he comes close."

Foo Fighters drummer Taylor Hawkins has described Seconds Out as "one of my drum bibles" and "one of my favorite-sounding drum records too".

== Reissues ==
In 1994, a digitally remastered version was released on CD by Virgin Records in Europe and by Atlantic Records in the US. Seconds Out was reissued with new stereo and 5.1 surround sound mixes completed by Nick Davis and released as part of the Genesis Live 1973–2007 box set in September 2009. On the original LP, "Dance on a Volcano" and "Los Endos" are banded as one track. This error was corrected on the box set. In November 2012, a 35th anniversary LP was pressed using the 2009 remix.

== Track listing ==
All songs written by Tony Banks, Phil Collins, Peter Gabriel, Steve Hackett and Mike Rutherford, except where noted.

Side one / CD1
No.	Title	Writer(s)	Recording date and location	Length
1.	"Squonk"	Rutherford, Banks	12 June 1977, early show, at Palais des Sports, Paris, France	6:41
2.	"The Carpet Crawlers"		21 January 1977, late show, at De Montfort Hall, Leicester, England	5:21
3.	"Robbery, Assault and Battery"	Banks, Collins	12 June 1977, early show	6:02
4.	"Afterglow"	Banks	12 June 1977, early show	4:26

Side two
No.	Title	Recording date and location	Length
5.	"Firth of Fifth"	12 June 1977, late show	8:56
6.	"I Know What I Like (In Your Wardrobe)"	14 June 1977 at Palais des Sports, Paris, France	8:45
7.	"The Lamb Lies Down on Broadway"	13 June 1977 at Palais des Sports, Paris, France	4:59
8.	"The Musical Box (Closing Section)"	12 June 1977, late show	3:21

Side three / CD2
No.	Title	Recording date and location	Length
1.	"Supper's Ready"	12, 13 and 14 June 1977	24:41

Side four
No.	Title	Writer(s)	Recording date and location	Length
2.	"The Cinema Show"		9 July 1976 at Apollo, Glasgow, Scotland	10:59
3.	"Dance on a Volcano"	Hackett, Rutherford, Banks, Collins	14 June 1977	5:09
4.	"Los Endos"	Hackett, Rutherford, Banks, Collins	14 June 1977	6:20

== Personnel ==
Credits taken from the album's sleeve notes.

Genesis

- Tony Banks – RMI Electra piano, Hammond T. organ, ARP Pro Soloist, Mellotron 400, Epiphone 12-string guitar, backing vocals
- Mike Rutherford – Shergold electric 12-string and bass guitar, 8-string bass guitar, Alvarez 12-string guitar, Moog Taurus bass pedals, backing vocals
- Steve Hackett – Gibson Les Paul, Hokada 12-string guitar
- Phil Collins – lead vocals, Premier and Gretsch drums

with

- Chester Thompson – Pearl drums, percussion (except "The Cinema Show")
- Bill Bruford – Ludwig and Hayman drums, percussion ("The Cinema Show" only)

Production

- Genesis – production
- David Hentschel – production
- Neil Ross – assistant production
- Armando Gallo – sleeve photos
- Robert Ellis – sleeve photos
- Graham Wood – sleeve photos
- A&D Design – sleeve layout
- Frank Sanson – art direction
- Tony Smith – management
- Alex Sim – management
- Brian Murray-Smith – management

The album's credits include details of which drummers are playing on each song. Mixed in with these credits are the notes "Robbery Assault & Battery – keyboard solo Phil" and "Cinema Show – Bill Bruford, Phil keyboard solo". This should be read to mean that Collins played the drums (along with Thompson or Bruford) during that solo, not that Collins played keyboards.

== Charts ==
=== Weekly charts ===
Chart (1977–1978)	Peak position
Australian Albums (Kent Music Report)	74
Canada Top Albums/CDs (RPM)	41
French Albums (SNEP)	10
Dutch Albums (Album Top 100)	19
German Albums (Offizielle Top 100)	17
Italian Albums (Musica e dischi)	7
New Zealand Albums (RMNZ)	14
Swedish Albums (Sverigetopplistan)	26
UK Albums (Official Charts)	4
US Billboard 200	47

Chart (2019)	Peak position
Scottish Albums (Official Charts)	51
UK Rock & Metal Albums (Official Charts)	6

=== Year-end charts ===
Chart (1978)	Position
German Albums (Offizielle Top 100)	35

== Certifications ==
Region	Certification	Certified units/sales
Germany (BVMI)	Gold	250,000^{^}
France (SNEP)	Gold	100,000^{*}
United Kingdom (BPI)	Gold	100,000^{^}
^{*} Sales figures based on certification alone.^{^} Shipments figures based on certification alone.
