= Wind & Wuthering =

Studio album by Genesis
- Released: 17 December 1976
- Recorded: September–October 1976
- Studios: Relight (Hilvarenbeek, Netherlands)
- Genre: Progressive rock
- Length: 51:03
- Labels: Charisma, Atco
- Producers: David Hentschel and Genesis

Genesis chronology
A Trick of the Tail (1976)	Wind & Wuthering (1976)	Spot the Pigeon (1977)

Singles from Wind & Wuthering
- 1. "Your Own Special Way" Released: 4 February 1977

Wind & Wuthering is the eighth studio album by the English progressive rock band Genesis. It was released on 17 December 1976 on Charisma Records and is their last studio album to feature guitarist Steve Hackett. Following the success of their 1976 tour to support their previous album A Trick of the Tail, the group relocated to Hilvarenbeek in the Netherlands to record a follow-up album, their first recorded outside the UK. Writing and recording caused internal friction, as Hackett felt some of his contributions were dropped in favour of material by keyboardist Tony Banks.

The album received a positive response from critics and contributed to the band's growing popularity in the US. It reached No. 7 in the UK and No. 26 in the US and sold steadily, eventually reaching Gold certification by the British Phonographic Institute and the Recording Industry Association of America. The single "Your Own Special Way" was the band's first charting single in the US, reaching No. 62. The band's 1977 tour, their last with Hackett, was their first with Chester Thompson hired as their live drummer. Three tracks left off the album were released during this time as an extended play, Spot the Pigeon. The album was reissued with a new stereo and 5.1 surround sound mix in 2007.

== Background and production ==
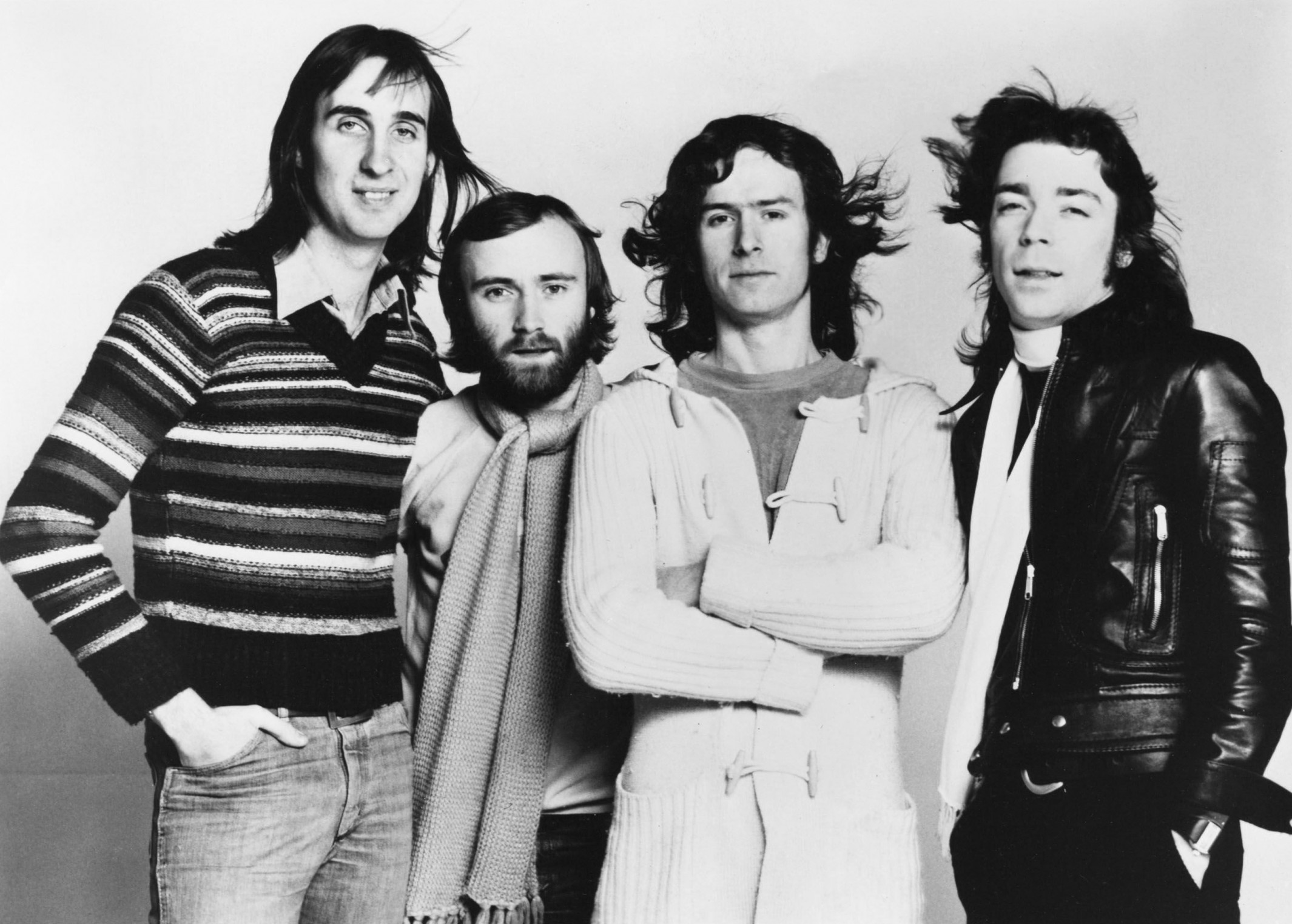
Genesis in 1976. From left: Mike Rutherford, Phil Collins, Tony Banks, and Steve Hackett. Wind & Wuthering was the band's last studio album with Hackett, who left after its supporting tour concluded.

By mid-1976, Genesis had survived the departure of original frontman Peter Gabriel, with drummer Phil Collins taking over lead vocals, and produced the critically and commercially successful album A Trick of the Tail and supporting tour. When they started work on a new album, keyboardist Tony Banks recalled a considerable amount of music had been written before the recording stage. Bassist and rhythm guitarist Mike Rutherford said it took an estimated six weeks to write the album. He pointed out the band wished to distance themselves from writing songs that were inspired by fantasy, something that their past albums "were full of". They wanted to write songs that they enjoyed, rather than having to please all the fans.

Hackett requested time to do another solo album before recording Wind & Wuthering, but was denied. He suggested ideas like dividing the song credits evenly so all four members had an equal number of songs on the album and bringing in outside musicians, which received a cold reception from the other members. He found himself arguing with the band as he felt his ideas were rejected in favour of material that Banks, in particular, had put forward. Having already released his first solo album, Voyage of the Acolyte, Hackett requested the band use more of his musical ideas on Wind & Wuthering. Banks ended up with six writing credits on the album's nine tracks, more than any other member. Collins spoke of Hackett's request: "We just wanted to use what we agreed was the strongest material, irrespective of who wrote it". He later said he did like Hackett's songs, but just thought Banks won the popular vote with the band. Hackett was not interested in writing shorter and simpler songs, and felt "the wackiness was being toned down".

Recording began in September 1976 with producer David Hentschel at Relight Studios in Hilvarenbeek, Netherlands, the first time Genesis recorded an album outside of the UK. The band learned that they could keep as much as 25 percent more of their earnings if they recorded an album overseas. Rutherford found the idea attractive, for the location offered fewer distractions. The band recorded quickly, and finished the basic tracks for the album in twelve days. Further work on the album was completed in October at Trident Studios in London; the album was mixed there in three weeks. Despite the rumors of tension in the band, Hentschel doesn't remember seeing conflict between the members, recalling that all four of them were in good spirits and that the sessions were productive and professional.

Collins explained that the album's title derives from a combination of the early working titles of "Unquiet Slumbers for the Sleepers..." and "...In That Quiet Earth", respectively. The first was named because of its "wind-like evocations"; the second as it has "a bit of a corny mood" like Emily Brontë's novel Wuthering Heights did. The songs took their titles from the last sentence in the novel. (Note: "I lingered round them, under that benign sky: watched the moths fluttering among the heath and harebells, listened to the soft wind breathing through the grass, and wondered how any one could ever imagine unquiet slumbers for the sleepers in that quiet earth.") The "Wind" also has links to "The House of the Four Winds", a piece guitarist Steve Hackett wrote that became the bridge on "Eleventh Earl of Mar", plus the wind alluded to on "Your Own Special Way". Banks suggested the album's title which received some initial doubts from management "because it isn't zap-pow enough."

The album's sleeve was designed and illustrated by Colin Elgie and Hipgnosis. Upon hearing the album's title Elgie liked its visual title and immediately thought of Heathcliff, a prominent character from Wuthering Heights, and English moorland. He had remembered a scene from the Middle Ages film The War Lord (1965) which featured Charlton Heston standing beside a tree and the birds in it take flight. The cover is a watercolour by Elgie which took around three weeks to complete. He looked back on his design and wished to use "a hint more colour, less monochromatic".

== Songs ==
=== Side one ===
"Eleventh Earl of Mar" refers to the historical figure of John Erskine, Earl of Mar, a Scottish Jacobite who led an unsuccessful attempt to overthrow George I. The first line of the song, "The sun had been up for a couple of hours", is the opening line of the novel The Flight of the Heron by D. K. Broster. Rutherford gained inspiration for the subject and lyrics having read a history book about the uprising. Hackett wrote the music and lyrics of the bridge, which was originally a section of a different song and concerns the events from the perspective of Erskine's child.

"One for the Vine" was a track that Banks wrote during the writing sessions for A Trick of the Tail. He spent a year working on the song until he "got it right". His aim was to piece together a variety of instrumental parts into a complete song without repeating a section. The lyrics, which came after Banks had arranged the track, are a musical fantasy about a man who had been declared a Christ-like religious figure, and was forced to lead people into battle, while the music featured a variety of styles. In the end, he becomes the prophet that he himself did not believe in, and becomes disillusioned. Banks was inspired by the science fiction novel Phoenix in Obsidian (1970) by Michael Moorcock. He likened the song to his earlier composition "The Lamia" from The Lamb Lies Down on Broadway, but felt "One for the Vine" was a much better song because his lyrics fitted the music better than the lyrics Peter Gabriel wrote for "The Lamia". The song became a live favourite, and regularly featured in the band's setlist for several years.

"Your Own Special Way" is an acoustic ballad written by Rutherford in open tuning, which includes a previously unused instrumental piece in the middle. He later said it was easier to join bits of individual songs together than write a single cohesive short piece.

Collins picked "Wot Gorilla?" as one of his favourite Genesis tracks as it brought in his influences of jazz fusion and Weather Report. Rutherford said its main theme is from the middle instrumental section from "One for the Vine", and that Collins suggested playing it in a "fast, jazzy rhythm" that built on the success of "Los Endos" from the previous album. Hackett was less enthusiastic and initially declared it "a very inferior instrumental", but later said it was "good rhythmically, but underdeveloped harmonically". Collins rearranged the piece with his big band project in the 1990s, and would play the drum pattern to see if his kick pedal was correctly adjusted.

=== Side two ===
"All in a Mouse's Night" is a comical tale inspired by Tom and Jerry. Banks wrote the lyrics with a cartoon-like feel. The song started out what Rutherford called "an involved epic" until the group abandoned this idea and approached it in a different way.

"Blood on the Rooftops" is a song concerning "the tedium and repetitiveness of television news and the overall mocking disgust that must sometimes accompany watching the news happen". The music to its chorus was written by Collins with Hackett writing the music to the verses, the song's lyrics and its classical guitar introduction. According to Hackett, the song was a love song originally. He explained, "When I heard the other lyrics on the album, there was a bit of a romantic tinge anyway, so I decided to go right the other way and make it as cynical as possible." It also addresses some political issues, which Genesis had previously stayed away from. Banks and Rutherford both claimed it was Hackett's best song as a member of the group.

"Unquiet Slumbers for the Sleepers..." and "...In That Quiet Earth" are two linked instrumental tracks. The first one was based on a bass pedals sequence by Rutherford with Hackett adding other chords with the guitar; the second one has two sections, with the first one based on a chord sequence by Hackett and second on a riff by Rutherford, then the other members added improvisations and variations on them. The titles refer to the last paragraph of the novel which inspired the album's title – Wuthering Heights, by Emily Brontë, which Banks had spotted in the book and thought the first title suited its mellow atmosphere. The tracks were written so that the band could showcase their instrumental talents, and stretch their musical skills as well as the songwriting.

"Afterglow" is a straightforward and concise love song, and an important development in the group's career, as it proved to them they could write short songs that they still liked. In contrast to the amount of time it took Banks to develop "One for the Vine", he wrote "Afterglow" "just about in the time it took to play it". Banks said the song "is about a reaction to a disaster and the realisation of what's important to you, in a slightly cataclysmic way [... I] made the chorus the essence of what the person is actually thinking". The ending features Collins' layered vocals. A few days after he wrote it, he came to the sudden realisation that its melody resembles that of "Have Yourself a Merry Little Christmas", which led to him playing it back and concluding "it wasn't the same". A Moog Taurus, a foot-operated analog synthesiser, was used to create a drone effect. It was a staple on Genesis tours for over forty years.

=== Unreleased material ===
The group rehearsed Hackett's "Please Don't Touch" for Wind & Wuthering, but decided not to record it after Collins felt he "couldn't get behind" the song. The group picked "Wot Gorilla?" in its place. Hackett later recorded the song for his solo album of the same name.

In May 1977, Genesis released the extended play Spot the Pigeon, containing three songs recorded during the Wind & Wuthering sessions but left off the final track selection–"Match of the Day", "Pigeons", and "Inside and Out". The first two are shorter, more commercial songs; the latter was left off because Collins said it was too long, did not "quite fit" with the overall sound of the album, and that insufficient space remained for it. He said the group considered including the EP of the extra tracks with the album, but decided against it as songs "tend to get lost" with the listener that way. "Inside and Out" remained a favourite of Hackett's, who felt it was stronger than some material that ended up on the album. Spot the Pigeon reached No. 14 in the UK.

== Release ==
Wind & Wuthering was released in the UK on 17 December 1976. Genesis biographer Armando Gallo claimed that the album had sold 100,000 copies in its first week, which should have equated to the album entering the UK chart at number one, but its release around the Christmas period meant that some record shops were unable to complete their returns for the chart data. The album reached No. 7 on the UK Albums Chart. In the US, the album peaked at No. 26 on the Billboard 200. By April 1977, the album had sold roughly 150,000 copies there. "Your Own Special Way" was released as a single in the U.S. that reached No. 62 on the Billboard singles chart, the band's first charting single with Collins as lead vocalist. In February 1977, the album was certified Gold by the British Phonographic Industry.

== Critical reception ==
Professional ratings
Review scores
Source	Rating
AllMusic	4/5 stars
Q	3/5 stars
Rolling Stone (1977)	(favorable)
The Rolling Stone Album Guide	3/5 stars

When recording finished, Banks expressed some concern that the album would be too "heavy" and "difficult" for people on their first listen, but he knew fans would give the material a chance. He noted the three tracks recorded during the album's sessions that were ultimately left off were "quite simple" and this meant the album had a heavier and more adventurous theme overall. Hackett and Banks have named it as one of their favourite of all Genesis records.

Wind & Wuthering turned out to be favourable with several critics at the time of release. In a positive review for Record Mirror, David Brown opened with "The grey misty, autumn cover gives away the mood of this album, with its mellow tones and airy songs". He believed the band's new following after the success of A Trick of the Tail would not be disappointed. He thought the album is "remarkably well-paced – the music flows ... in an almost undisturbed stream ... subtle instrumentals cleverly link the songs together". Barbara Sharone had multiple sessions listening to the album for Sounds. She found the album too dense to appreciate with just one listen, and "less immediate but more substantial" than A Trick of the Tail. Genesis seemed to her more relaxed and self-confident, and "One for the Vine" was for her "Genesis' finest moment". Rolling Stone gave the album a positive review, praising Genesis for being more experimental and steeped in conventional rock than their progressive rock contemporaries. They made particular note of "Your Own Special Way", calling it "a first-rate pop song". Wind & Wuthering was included in Billboard magazine's Top Album Picks feature, which stated "Genesis has grown into one of the premiere art-rock bands to come out of England and its fans will not be disappointed with the latest offering ... sometimes the music and the words are brilliant". Stephen Lavers for National RockStar named the album the best from Genesis at the time of its release and their most ambitious work since The Lamb Lies Down on Broadway. Circus magazine described the album as "flawless" with "the most mature orchestration to date" from the band. Bruce Malamut for Crawdaddy! said the "Unquiet Slumbers" suite was "majestic" with its "colourful sound textures".

The album continued to receive praise from retrospective critics. Stephen Thomas Erlewine made note of "Your Own Special Way", calling it "the poppiest tune the group had cut and also the first that could qualify as a love song". His reaction to Wind & Wuthering as a whole was mild, and he summarised it as being in "the same English eccentric ground that was the group's stock in trade since Trespass". Andy Fyfe, writing for Q, named "One for the Vine" one of Genesis' "moments of impressive songwriting".

== Tour ==
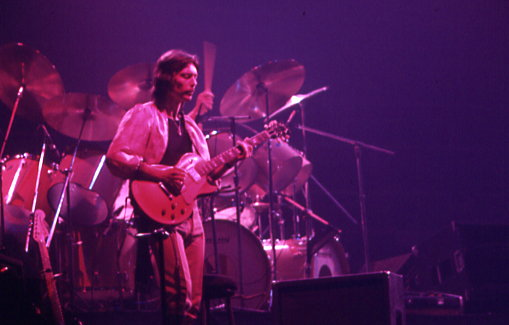
Steve Hackett on tour with Genesis to promote Wind & Wuthering, shortly before he left the band

Following the album's release, Genesis embarked on a world tour covering Europe, North America, and their first dates in South America. The tour marked the first time Chester Thompson was hired as their touring drummer; Thompson replaced Bill Bruford who played drums on the A Trick of the Tail tour. Bruford was critical of his stint with Genesis as he had no musical input, and consequently, had started rehearsing with John Wetton and Rick Wakeman. Collins had become a fan of Frank Zappa's Roxy and Elsewhere album, which featured Thompson as one of two drummers, and consequently asked him to join the touring band without an audition.

The band concentrated their stage set with an elaborate lighting display, including two rows of 747 landing lights, and their own patented computer-controlled laser light system. The tour received enthusiastic responses from crowds. Collins recognised a growth in the size of their audience in some cities they visited in the US. The tour began on 1 January 1977 with a sold-out UK leg, beginning with three nights at London's Rainbow Theatre where over 80,000 applications were made for the 8,000 available tickets. On 31 January, the live film Genesis In Concert premiered at the ABC Cinema, Shaftesbury Avenue with Princess Anne and Captain Mark Phillips in the audience.

The North American leg saw Genesis play their first show at several larger venues, including Madison Square Garden in New York City and the Los Angeles Forum. Their concerts in Brazil were attended by over 150,000 people, with a proposed 100,000-person gig cancelled for fear of rioting. Each band member was accompanied by an armed bodyguard during their stay. By the middle of the tour, Hackett had become frustrated with the band, having lost interest in touring, and wanted to make a solo record. After the tour finished, and partway through mixing the live album Seconds Out, he decided to quit Genesis.

== Reissues ==
Wind & Wuthering was first reissued on CD in 1985 by Charisma Records. A remastered CD followed in 1994 by Virgin and Atlantic Records. In 2007, the album was released in a new stereo and 5.1 surround sound mix individually and as part of the Genesis 1976–1982 studio album box set engineered by Nick Davis and Tony Cousins.

== Track listing ==
Side one
No.	Title	Writer(s)	Length
1.	"Eleventh Earl of Mar"	Tony Banks, Steve Hackett, Mike Rutherford	7:46
2.	"One for the Vine"	Banks	10:01
3.	"Your Own Special Way"	Rutherford	6:19
4.	"Wot Gorilla?" (instrumental)	Phil Collins, Banks	3:23
Total length:			27:29

Side two
No.	Title	Writer(s)	Length
1.	"All in a Mouse's Night"	Banks	6:40
2.	"Blood on the Rooftops"	Hackett, Collins	5:29
3.	"'Unquiet slumbers for the sleepers..." (instrumental)	Hackett, Rutherford	2:24 (Note: The original North American edition combined "Unquiet slumbers for the sleepers..." and "...in that quiet earth" as a single track for a running time of 7:14.)
4.	"...in that quiet earth'" (instrumental)	Hackett, Rutherford, Banks, Collins	4:50
5.	"Afterglow"	Banks	4:11
Total length:			23:34

== Personnel ==
Taken from the sleeve notes:

Genesis

- Phil Collins – vocals, drums, cymbals, percussion
- Steve Hackett – electric guitars, nylon classical guitar, 12 string guitar, kalimba, autoharp
- Mike Rutherford – 4, 6, and 8 string bass guitars, electric and 12 string acoustic guitars, bass pedals
- Tony Banks – Steinway grand piano, ARP 2600 synthesizer, ARP Pro Soloist synthesizer, Hammond organ, Mellotron, Roland RS-202 string synthesizer, Fender Rhodes electric piano

Production

- David Hentschel – production, engineer
- Genesis – arrangement, production
- Pierre Geoffroy Chateau – assistant engineer
- Nick "Cod" Bradford – assistant engineer
- Hipgnosis and Colin Elgie – sleeve design
- Tex (Nibs) Read, Andy Mackrill, Paul Padun – equipment

Recorded at Relight Studios, Hilvarenbeek, Netherlands. Remixed at Trident Studios, London

== Charts ==
Chart (1977)	Peak position
Australian Albums (Kent Music Report)	57
Canada Top Albums/CDs (RPM)	31
Dutch Albums (Album Top 100)	15
Finnish Albums (The Official Finnish Charts)	18
French Albums (SNEP)	3
German Albums (Offizielle Top 100)	19
Italian Albums (Musica e dischi)	7
New Zealand Albums (RMNZ)	18
Norwegian Albums (VG-lista)	12
Swedish Albums (Sverigetopplistan)	21
Swiss Albums (Schweizer Hitparade)	7
UK Albums (Official Charts)	7
US Billboard 200	26

Chart (2014)	Peak position
UK Rock & Metal Albums (Official Charts)	30

== Certifications ==
Certifications for Wind & Wuthering
Region	Certification	Certified units/sales
Canada (Music Canada)	Gold	50,000^{^}
France (SNEP)	Gold	100,000^{*}
United Kingdom (BPI)	Gold	100,000^{^}
United States (RIAA)	Gold	500,000^{^}
^{*} Sales figures based on certification alone.^{^} Shipments figures based on certification alone.
