= Genesis Live at Wembley Stadium =

Invisible Touch Tour

Video by Genesis
- Released: 22nd May 1989
- Recorded: 2–3 July 1987
- Venue: Wembley Stadium, London
- Genre: Rock
- Length: 132 minutes
- Label: Virgin Music Video

Genesis chronology
Invisible Touch (1986)	Invisible Touch Tour (1989)	We Can't Dance (1991)

Professional ratings
Review scores
Source	Rating
AllMusic	2.5/5 stars

Invisible Touch Tour is a live video by the English rock band Genesis, released on the 22nd May 1989 on Virgin Music Video. It was the first concert ever shot in High Definition and cameras and lenses had to be flown in from the United States and Japan. It was directed by Jim Yukich and produced by Paul Flattery of FYI. It was edited at the band's facilities known as The Farm by Jerry Behrens and David Foster. It documents the band's four sold out shows at Wembley Stadium in London between 2-3 July 1987 at the end of their Invisible Touch Tour promoting their thirteenth studio album, Invisible Touch. A limited edition release included a CD single containing the live version of "Domino" as performed on the video. In November 2003, the video was reissued on DVD and renamed Genesis Live at Wembley Stadium.

== Contents ==
The bonus features on the 2003 DVD include a photo gallery, scans of the tour programme, and a tour documentary. Some copies of the original 1989 VHS releases included a 3" CD of "Domino" from the video, indexed as two tracks ("In the Glow of the Night" and "The Last Domino").

The set list features six of the eight songs from Invisible Touch. A medley of "In the Cage", "...In That Quiet Earth" and "Afterglow" was performed at the shows but not included on the release.

Performances of "Abacab" and "The Brazilian" from the Wembley shows were later included as the B-sides of the "Invisible Touch (Live)" single; "Tonight, Tonight, Tonight" appeared as a B-side on the "Tell Me Why" CD single; "The Brazilian" appeared again on the 2000 compilation Genesis Archive 2: 1976-1992 and "Mama" and "That's All" appeared on the 1992 live album The Way We Walk, Volume One: The Shorts.

== Track listing ==
1. "Mama"
2. "Abacab"
3. "Domino (Part I: In the Glow of the Night; Part II: The Last Domino)"
4. "That's All"
5. "The Brazilian"
6. "Land of Confusion"
7. "Tonight, Tonight, Tonight"
8. "Throwing It All Away"
9. "Home by the Sea/Second Home by the Sea"
10. "Invisible Touch"
11. Drum Duet
12. "Los Endos"
13. "Turn It On Again, including the medley: Everybody Needs Somebody to Love/(I Can't Get No) Satisfaction/Twist and Shout/Reach Out (I'll Be There)/You've Lost That Lovin' Feelin'/Pinball Wizard/In the Midnight Hour"

== Personnel ==
- Phil Collins – drums, electronic percussion, percussion, lead vocals
- Tony Banks – keyboards
- Mike Rutherford – lead guitar, bass guitar, bass pedals, backing vocals

with:

- Daryl Stuermer – bass guitar, guitar, backing vocals
- Chester Thompson – drums, electronic percussion

== Certifications ==
Region	Certification	Certified units/sales
Argentina (CAPIF)	Platinum	8,000^{^}
France (SNEP)	Gold	10,000^{*}
Germany (BVMI)	Gold	25,000^{^}
^{*} Sales figures based on certification alone.^{^} Shipments figures based on certification alone.
