= Invisible Touch Tour =

1986–87 concert tour by Genesis

- Tour by Genesis
- Location: Asia; Australia; Europe; North America
- Associated album: Invisible Touch
- Start date: 18 September 1986
- End date: 4 July 1987
- Legs: 7
- No. of shows: 113

Genesis concert chronology
- Mama Tour (1983–84); Invisible Touch Tour (1986–87); We Can't Dance Tour (1992)

The Invisible Touch Tour was a worldwide concert tour by the English rock band Genesis. The tour began on 18 September 1986 in Detroit and ended on 4 July 1987 in London. London dates at Wembley Stadium were filmed for a video release entitled Genesis Live at Wembley Stadium. The group earned as much as $300,000 a night in North America alone. The five shows in East Rutherford, New Jersey, Philadelphia, and Washington, D.C. in May 1987 grossed $5.4 million and were attended by a total of 273,414 people.

== Set list ==
Whilst the set list varied, this is a representation of the average set list from this tour. Each show opened with the music video to "Anything She Does" from Invisible Touch. "Invisible Touch", "Throwing It All Away" and "Land of Confusion" were performed in a lower key to make it easier for Collins to sing and protect his voice.

1. "Mama"
2. "Abacab"
3. "Land of Confusion"
4. "That's All"
5. "Domino"
6. "Your Own Special Way" (performed in Australia only and with a string section)
7. "In Too Deep" (eliminated after 20 December 1986)
8. "The Brazilian"
9. "Follow You Follow Me" (eliminated after 13 December 1986)
10. "Tonight, Tonight, Tonight"
11. "Home by the Sea"/"Second Home by the Sea"
12. "Throwing It All Away"
13. Medley
  1. "In the Cage"
  2. "...In That Quiet Earth"
  3. "Supper's Ready" (replaced by "Afterglow" after 2 December 1986)
    1. "Apocalypse in 9/8"
    2. "As Sure as Eggs Is Eggs (Aching Men's Feet)"
14. "Invisible Touch"
15. "Drum Duet"
16. "Los Endos"
17. "Turn It On Again" (including snippets of "Everybody Needs Somebody to Love", "(I Can't Get No) Satisfaction", "Twist and Shout", "All Day and All of the Night", "Reach Out (I'll Be There)", "You've Lost That Lovin' Feelin'", "Pinball Wizard", and "In the Midnight Hour")

== Personnel ==
Genesis

- Phil Collins – lead vocals, drums, electronic percussion, percussion
- Tony Banks – keyboards, moog taurus
- Mike Rutherford – guitar, bass, bass pedals, backing vocals

Additional musicians

- Daryl Stuermer – bass, guitar, bass pedals, backing vocals
- Chester Thompson – drums, electronic percussion

== Tour dates ==
List of 1986 concerts
| Date | City | Country | Venue |
|---|---|---|---|
| 18 September 1986 | Detroit | United States | Joe Louis Arena |
| 19 September 1986 | Detroit | United States | Joe Louis Arena |
| 20 September 1986 | Detroit | United States | Joe Louis Arena |
| 22 September 1986 | Toronto | Canada | Exhibition Stadium |
| 24 September 1986 | Philadelphia | United States | The Spectrum |
| 25 September 1986 | Philadelphia | United States | The Spectrum |
| 26 September 1986 | Philadelphia | United States | The Spectrum |
| 27 September 1986 | Philadelphia | United States | The Spectrum |
| 29 September 1986 | New York City | United States | Madison Square Garden |
| 30 September 1986 | New York City | United States | Madison Square Garden |
| 1 October 1986 | New York City | United States | Madison Square Garden |
| 2 October 1986 | New York City | United States | Madison Square Garden |
| 3 October 1986 | New York City | United States | Madison Square Garden |
| 5 October 1986 | Rosemont | United States | Rosemont Horizon |
| 6 October 1986 | Rosemont | United States | Rosemont Horizon |
| 7 October 1986 | Rosemont | United States | Rosemont Horizon |
| 8 October 1986 | Rosemont | United States | Rosemont Horizon |
| 9 October 1986 | Rosemont | United States | Rosemont Horizon |
| 10 October 1986 | Rosemont | United States | Rosemont Horizon |
| 13 October 1986 | Inglewood | United States | The Forum |
| 14 October 1986 | Inglewood | United States | The Forum |
| 15 October 1986 | Inglewood | United States | The Forum |
| 16 October 1986 | Inglewood | United States | The Forum |
| 17 October 1986 | Inglewood | United States | The Forum |
| 19 October 1986 | Oakland | United States | Oakland–Alameda County Coliseum Arena |
| 20 October 1986 | Oakland | United States | Oakland–Alameda County Coliseum Arena |
| 21 October 1986 | Oakland | United States | Oakland–Alameda County Coliseum Arena |
| 22 October 1986 | Oakland | United States | Oakland–Alameda County Coliseum Arena |
| 23 October 1986 | Oakland | United States | Oakland–Alameda County Coliseum Arena |
| 24 October 1986 | Oakland | United States | Oakland–Alameda County Coliseum Arena |
| 23 November 1986 | Auckland | New Zealand | Western Springs Stadium |
| 25 November 1986 | Sydney | Australia | Sydney Entertainment Centre |
| 26 November 1986 | Sydney | Australia | Sydney Entertainment Centre |
| 27 November 1986 | Sydney | Australia | Sydney Entertainment Centre |
| 29 November 1986 | Boondall | Australia | Brisbane Entertainment Centre |
| 30 November 1986 | Boondall | Australia | Brisbane Entertainment Centre |
| 2 December 1986 | West Lakes | Australia | Football Park |
| 5 December 1986 | Perth | Australia | Perth Entertainment Centre |
| 6 December 1986 | Perth | Australia | Perth Entertainment Centre |
| 9 December 1986 | Melbourne | Australia | National Tennis Centre |
| 10 December 1986 | Melbourne | Australia | National Tennis Centre |
| 11 December 1986 | Melbourne | Australia | National Tennis Centre |
| 13 December 1986 | Melbourne | Australia | Olympic Park Stadium |
| 15 December 1986 | Sydney | Australia | Sydney Entertainment Centre |
| 16 December 1986 | Sydney | Australia | Sydney Entertainment Centre |
| 17 December 1986 | Sydney | Australia | Sydney Entertainment Centre |
| 18 December 1986 | Sydney | Australia | Sydney Entertainment Centre |
| 19 December 1986 | Sydney | Australia | Sydney Entertainment Centre |
| 20 December 1986 | Sydney | Australia | Sydney Entertainment Centre |

List of 1987 concerts
| Date | City | Country | Venue |
|---|---|---|---|
| 15 January 1987 | Houston | United States | The Summit |
| 16 January 1987 | Houston | United States | The Summit |
| 18 January 1987 | Dallas | United States | Reunion Arena |
| 19 January 1987 | Dallas | United States | Reunion Arena |
| 21 January 1987 | Kansas City | United States | Kemper Arena |
| ~~22 January 1987~~ | Kansas City | United States | Kemper Arena |
| 23 January 1987 | Chapel Hill | United States | Dean Smith Center |
| 24 January 1987 | Indianapolis | United States | Hoosier Dome |
| 25 January 1987 | Richfield | United States | Coliseum at Richfield |
| 26 January 1987 | Richfield | United States | Coliseum at Richfield |
| 27 January 1987 | Richfield | United States | Coliseum at Richfield |
| 29 January 1987 | Landover | United States | Capital Centre |
| 31 January 1987 | Chapel Hill | United States | Dean Smith Center |
| 1 February 1987 | Lexington | United States | Rupp Arena |
| 15 February 1987 | Hartford | United States | Hartford Civic Center |
| 16 February 1987 | Worcester | United States | Centrum in Worcester |
| 17 February 1987 | Worcester | United States | Centrum in Worcester |
| 18 February 1987 | Worcester | United States | Centrum in Worcester |
| 20 February 1987 | Hampton | United States | Hampton Coliseum |
| 21 February 1987 | Hampton | United States | Hampton Coliseum |
| 22 February 1987 | Chapel Hill | United States | Dean Smith Center |
| 23 February 1987 | Chapel Hill | United States | Dean Smith Center |
| 25 February 1987 | Atlanta | United States | Omni Coliseum |
| 26 February 1987 | Atlanta | United States | Omni Coliseum |
| 28 February 1987 | Orlando | United States | Florida Citrus Bowl |
| 1 March 1987 | Miami | United States | Miami Orange Bowl |
| 13 March 1987 | Tokyo | Japan | Nippon Budokan |
| 14 March 1987 | Tokyo | Japan | Nippon Budokan |
| 15 March 1987 | Tokyo | Japan | Nippon Budokan |
| 16 March 1987 | Tokyo | Japan | Nippon Budokan |
| 18 March 1987 | Osaka | Japan | Castle Hall |
| 19 March 1987 | Osaka | Japan | Castle Hall |
| 10 May 1987 | Málaga | Spain | Estadio La Rosaleda |
| 13 May 1987 | Madrid | Spain | Vicente Calderón Stadium |
| 15 May 1987 | Toulouse | France | Stade des Sept Deniers |
| 16 May 1987 | Montreux | Switzerland | Montreux Jazz Festival |
| 17 May 1987 | Rome | Italy | Stadio Flaminio |
| 19 May 1987 | Milan | Italy | San Siro |
| 22 May 1987 | Los Angeles | United States | Dodger Stadium |
| 24 May 1987 | Pittsburgh | United States | Three Rivers Stadium |
| 25 May 1987 | Washington, D.C. | United States | Robert F. Kennedy Memorial Stadium |
| 28 May 1987 | Philadelphia | United States | Veterans Stadium |
| 29 May 1987 | Philadelphia | United States | Veterans Stadium |
| 30 May 1987 | East Rutherford | United States | Giants Stadium |
| 31 May 1987 | East Rutherford | United States | Giants Stadium |
| 2 June 1987 | Paris | France | Palais Omnisports de Paris-Bercy |
| 3 June 1987 | Paris | France | Hippodrome de Vincennes |
| 5 June 1987 | Gentofte | Denmark | Gentofte Stadion |
| 7 June 1987 | Hannover | West Germany | Niedersachsenstadion |
| 8 June 1987 | West Berlin | West Germany | Platz der Republik |
| 10 June 1987 | Dortmund | West Germany | Westfalenhallen |
| 11 June 1987 | Rotterdam | Netherlands | De Kuip |
| 13 June 1987 | Basel | Switzerland | St. Jakob Stadium |
| 14 June 1987 | Nancy | France | Stade Marcel Picot |
| 16 June 1987 | Vienna | Austria | Ernst-Happel-Stadion |
| 18 June 1987 | Budapest | Hungary | Népstadion |
| 20 June 1987 | Mannheim | West Germany | Maimarktgelände |
| 21 June 1987 | Munich | West Germany | Olympiastadion |
| 23 June 1987 | Nantes | France | Stade de la Beaujoire |
| ~~24 June 1987~~ | ~~Paris~~ | France | ~~Hippodrome de Vincennes~~ |
| 26 June 1987 | Glasgow | Scotland | Hampden Park |
| 28 June 1987 | Leeds | England | Roundhay Park |
| 1 July 1987 | London | England | Wembley Stadium |
| 2 July 1987 | London | England | Wembley Stadium |
| 3 July 1987 | London | England | Wembley Stadium |
| 4 July 1987 | London | England | Wembley Stadium |

== See also ==
- List of highest-grossing concert tours
