= Invisible Touch =

Studio album by Genesis
- Released: 6 June 1986
- Recorded: October 1985 – February 1986
- Studios: The Farm (Chiddingfold, Surrey)
- Genre: Pop rock
- Length: 45:42
- Labels: Charisma/Virgin; Atlantic
- Producers: Genesis; Hugh Padgham

Genesis chronology
Genesis (1983)	Invisible Touch (1986)	We Can't Dance (1991)

Singles from Invisible Touch
- 1. "Invisible Touch" Released: 19 May 1986; 2. "Throwing It All Away" Released: 6 August 1986 (US) (Note: released in the UK in June 1987); 3. "In Too Deep" Released: 18 August 1986 (UK) (Note: released in the US in 1987); 4. "Land of Confusion" Released: 10 November 1986 (Note: released in the US in October 1986); 5. "Tonight, Tonight, Tonight" Released: 29 January 1987 (Note: released in the UK in March 1987)

Invisible Touch is the thirteenth studio album by the English rock band Genesis, released on 6 June 1986 by Atlantic Records in the United States and on 9 June 1986 by Charisma/Virgin Records in the United Kingdom. After taking a break in 1984 for each member to continue his solo career, the band reconvened in October 1985 to write and record Invisible Touch with engineer and producer Hugh Padgham. As with their previous album, it was written entirely through group improvisations and no material developed prior to recording was used.

Invisible Touch was a worldwide success and reached No. 1 on the UK Albums Chart and No. 3 on the US Billboard 200. It remains the band's highest selling album after it was certified multi-platinum for over 1.2 million copies sold in the UK and 6 million sold in the US. Genesis became the first band and foreign act to have five singles from one album reach the top five on the US Billboard Hot 100, with "Invisible Touch" being their first and only song to reach No. 1 on the charts. The album received mixed reviews upon its release and retrospectively, with its more pop-oriented approach and perceived similarities to lead singer Phil Collins' solo work receiving both praise and criticism. In 2007, the album was re-released with new stereo and 5.1 surround sound mixes.

== Background ==
In February 1984, the band completed their 1983–1984 tour in support of their previous album Genesis (1983), which became their biggest selling album at the time of release and spawned the UK top five hit "Mama". The group followed this with a period of inactivity to allow each member to continue their respective solo careers; Mike Rutherford formed his group Mike + The Mechanics and had success with their debut album, Tony Banks concentrated on film scores and released Soundtracks (1986), and Phil Collins released his third solo album No Jacket Required (1985), which was a major worldwide commercial hit. In the summer of 1985, towards the end of his solo tour, Collins confirmed that Genesis had agreed to start work on a new album that October. This put an end to a false announcement that aired on BBC Radio 1 suggesting the three had split. Rutherford felt that the break affected the group's musical style: "We had done so much work outside the band, it seemed we had gone through a lot more musical changes, although the development is largely unconscious."

== Writing and recording ==
Invisible Touch was recorded between October 1985 and February 1986 at The Farm, the band's private recording studio in Chiddingfold, Surrey. They were joined by engineer and producer Hugh Padgham, who had worked with the band since Abacab (1981) and produced the album with the group, with Paul Gommersall as assistant engineer. Earlier in 1985, the studio was upgraded to a plan supervised by Masami "Sam" Toyishima.

"On day one, we had no songs, no ideas, and a blank bit of paper. Phil was always keen to fill that bit of paper – he was very organised – and we let him."

— Mike Rutherford.

The group approached the writing sessions for Invisible Touch with a greater sense of confidence, as they had now become a big live act in the US and had reached a new level of commercial success worldwide. As with Genesis, they entered the studio with no preconceived ideas and developed songs from recorded jams and improvisations, a process Collins compared to as "close to jazz". The group considered their strongest songs were those arranged in this way, so they repeated this approach for Invisible Touch. Collins said: "You never quite know what's going to happen. It's just the three of us chopping away, fine-tuning and honing down all these ideas." A typical session saw the trio work from 11am to as late as 2am the following morning, and start with Collins setting up a drum pattern on the drum machine so Banks and Rutherford could jam ideas. Collins would then sing vocal lines, which created an atmosphere and the basis for a song. Collins recalled his impetuous attitude during the writing sessions and suggested bits of songs be pieced together as early as possible, but Banks and Rutherford were reluctant to do so. Many of the songs on the album evolved from Banks using the recording function on his E-mu Emulator to capture sounds in the studio, and listening back for potential sounds and rhythms that could be used in a song. The keyboard allowed just 17 seconds to be recorded.

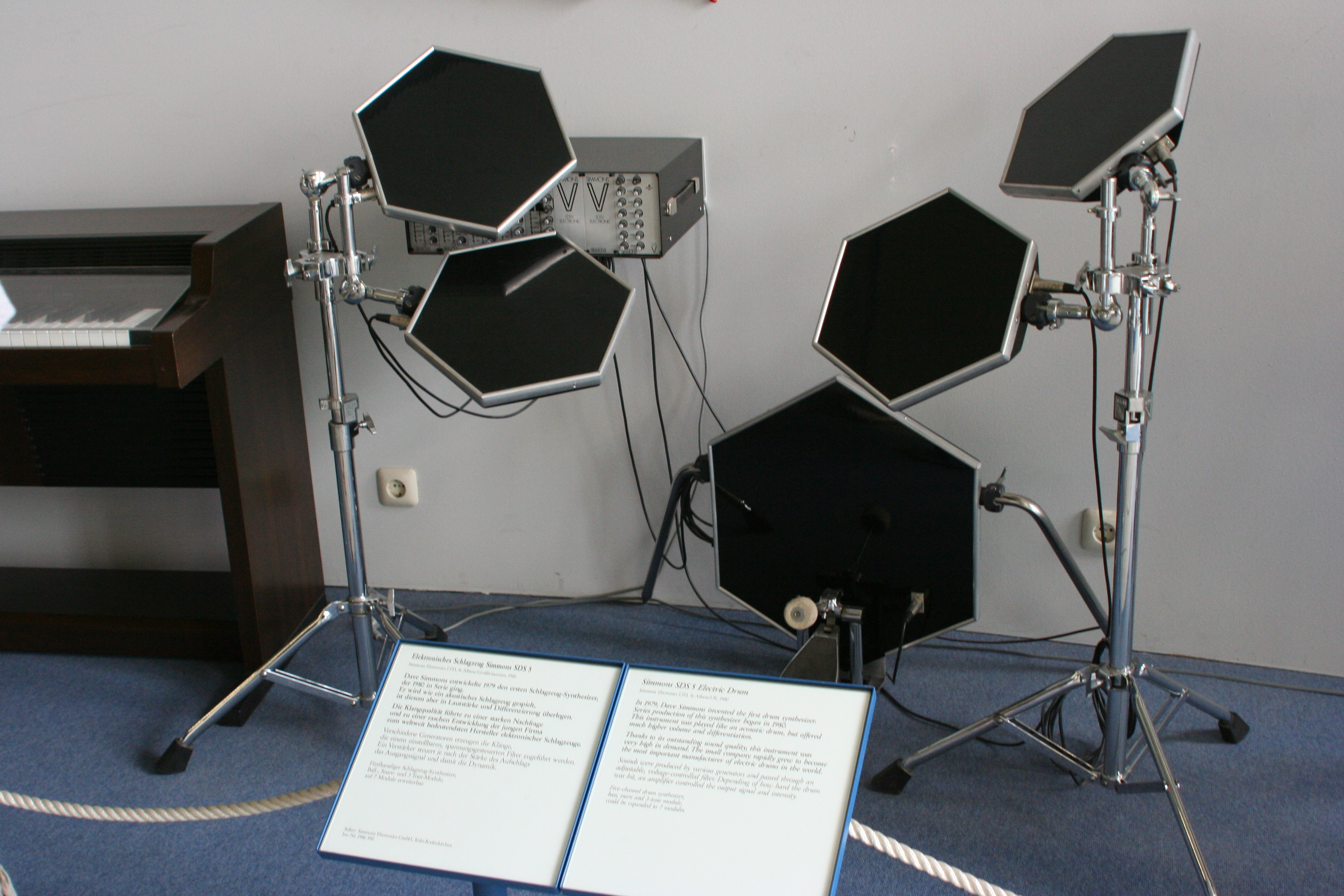
A Simmons electronic drum kit similar to the one Phil Collins plays on the album.

The album features Collins playing on a Simmons electronic drum kit. In order to capture more of a sound from the Simmons kit rather than feeding it directly into the mixing desk, Padgham also fed the tracks through a mixer and into a PA system before playing it "very, very loud" in the studio. Padgham later said that the Simmons sounded "a bit thin and toneless." Collins also used a Roland Pad-8, an electronic pad that triggers percussion sounds from the MIDI instruments used on the album, including a Roland TR-707 drum machine with Latin-inspired samples and Collins' own E-mu Emulator.

After several jams had been put down on tape, the band listened back to them and picked out the strongest moments with the aim of arranging them into a song. A drum machine was used to create a guiding rhythm, before the guitar and keyboard parts were fully arranged and re-recorded before Collins would replace the drum machine with his own drums last. The band discussed a song's potential length, and whether to write lyrics for it or keep it as an instrumental. The lyrics to a track were written after the music was recorded, and were penned by a single member as the group considered the individual had a strong enough direction to carry the song's message through. Collins wrote the words for "Invisible Touch", "Tonight, Tonight, Tonight", and "In Too Deep"; Rutherford wrote for "Land of Confusion" and "Throwing It All Away"; Banks wrote "Domino" and "Anything She Does".

The group arranged a greater number of songs for Invisible Touch than before, which required additional time to select which tracks to release. This was not the case with Genesis, where strong enough ideas were more scarce; Banks said that "if a song was around, we put it on". Rutherford noted that Genesis had a dark mood to it, yet Invisible Touch had a bigger energy. During the writing sessions Collins realised the band were coming up with fresh and unique material that it had not done before, "which is not easy after 15 albums", and considered them stronger than those on Genesis. Banks maintained this view, thinking the shorter tracks on Invisible Touch were stronger than the previous album.

== Songs ==
=== Side one ===
"Invisible Touch" originated as the band were working on "The Last Domino", the second part of "Domino". During the session Rutherford began to play an improvised guitar riff with an added echo effect, to which Collins replied with the off-the-cuff lyric, "She seems to have an invisible touch, yeah". This led to Collins writing the lyrics to the song, with his improvised line becoming its chorus hook. He wrote the lyrics based around a person who gets under one's skin which he had "Known a few. You know they’re going to mess you up, but you can't resist". Collins later said that "large chunks" of the lyrics are about his first wife Andrea Bertorelli, to whom he was married from 1975 to 1980. The group wanted to keep the song simple in structure, but thought an eight-bar bridge with a key change and using a sequenced keyboard part complemented the arrangement. Banks produced eight different versions in step time, some ideas for which he had thought of ahead of time while others were a rough improvisation. The chosen version was the "most random" one. As the band performed "Invisible Touch" in a lower key on tour, Banks had to produce a new sequenced section which was "a real drag" as he was unable to make one as strong as the one on the album. Rutherford expressed a desire for the band to explore different musical themes for the song, but later felt the lyric had "always felt so comfortable" to him and saw no reason to change it. Collins rates the track highly and picked it as his favourite Genesis song. He added: "It's a great pop song. It encapsulated the whole record and it pushed Genesis into a bit of an R&B area, a little like a Prince thing", and also compared his drumming on the track to American singer Sheila E, of whom he is a fan.

The basis for "Tonight, Tonight, Tonight" came about from Banks, who spent some time improvising with different keyboard sounds over a rhythm Collins and Rutherford were playing. Similar to that of "Invisible Touch", Collins then came out with the word "monkey" and explored it vocally which led to the song's working title to be "Monkey/Zulu". The rest of the lyrics were then written around the word. Rutherford thought the track resembled the "old-style Genesis" as it covers more ground musically with a "fairly involved" instrumental section in the middle. Banks agreed with Rutherford's view on the song, pointing out its complexity.

The lyrics to "Land of Confusion" were written by Rutherford, and they were the last set of words written for the album. Rutherford was behind schedule to get the lyrics to the song finished, but thought the "time was right" for him to write a protest song. He was struck with the flu when it was time for Collins to record the song's vocals. He recalled Collins "came over to my house ... he sat on my bed like a secretary ... I was in a kind of delirious state with a very high temperature and I dictated it to him and I remember thinking, 'I think I told him the right thing ... Was it all rubbish or was it any good?'".

The lyrics to "In Too Deep" were written by Collins after he was approached to write a song for the soundtrack of the British crime drama film Mona Lisa (1986). He wrote the chorus during some spare time at a hotel in Sydney, Australia, but he was unable to write verses for it until the band were recording the song in the studio. They had difficulty in writing a chorus, so Collins suggested the part that he had written.

=== Side two ===
Banks gained inspiration for "Anything She Does" from pictures of scantily clad women the band would cut out and place on the wall of their recording studio. It features a brass sound that Banks sampled from "some tape" that he had; he clarified that the brass was not from the Phenix Horns, the brass section for Earth, Wind and Fire that were previously used on Abacab.

"Domino" is a track split into two sections—"In the Glow of the Night" and "The Last Domino". Banks wrote the lyrics based on the idea that politicians often fail to think through their ideas and the consequences of their actions. Rutherford thinks "Domino" is "one of the best things" the band has done. He was aware that due to the popularity of MTV and the increased pressure to deliver hit singles, people would often forget about their longer songs like "Domino" in favor of the shorter, more commercial hits.

"Throwing It All Away" developed from a guitar riff from Rutherford, who also wrote the lyrics. Collins described it as like a "one-note samba". It was a heavy guitar song in its original form, with Collins "drumming in a John Bonham style". As the chorus developed, its mood changed to that of a softer one "matched by the single love-song lyric".

"The Brazilian" is an instrumental based around a sample that Banks had recorded on his E-mu Emulator playing throughout the track, which he achieved by sticking a knife onto the keyboard. He realised he could have done it electronically, but the knife "looks better that way." Collins recalled it was put together when the group were "fooling around" in the studio, and he had been experimenting with sounds that could be programmed into his Simmons kit.

=== Additional material ===
Three additional songs - "Do the Neurotic," "Feeding The Fire," and "I'd Rather Be You" - were recorded during the album's sessions but were cut from the album's final track selection. They were subsequently released as B-sides across the five singles released from the album. The tracks were included in the 2007 box set Genesis 1983–1998 as well as the 2000 box set Genesis Archive 2: 1976–1992.

== Artwork ==
The cover art was designed by 26-year-old David Baker (known as "Baker Dave") of Assorted iMaGes, who had previously designed the sleeve for No Jacket Required and several of Collins's singles. The band had no music prepared and no title at the time of the first briefing, but wanted a design that combined the personality of each member and the outer sleeve to not contain a group photograph. Baker produced several rough designs and presented them to the band for feedback, by which point some music had been put down and the album's title had been agreed upon. Baker took the themes suggested by the title and produced fifteen ideas, one of which was a graphical representation of how the inner ear takes in sound. Another was the image of a transparent hand which all three members liked, and Baker used that with a schematic design of a sound wave pattern with an image of a nuclear family in the background.

== Release ==
Invisible Touch was first released on 6 June 1986 in the US by Atlantic Records; its release in the United Kingdom followed on 9 June 1986 by Charisma and Virgin Records. The album reached number one on the UK Albums Chart for three weeks from 21 June 1986 during a 96-week stay on the chart, and peaked at No. 3 on the US Billboard 200 during an 85-week stay.

Genesis released five singles from Invisible Touch from 1986 to 1987: "Invisible Touch", "Throwing It All Away", "Land of Confusion", "In Too Deep" and "Tonight, Tonight, Tonight". All five reached the top five on the US Billboard Hot 100, making Genesis the first group and the first non-American act to achieve this feat. The band equalled the record of five top-five singles from the same album set by Michael Jackson, and later matched by Janet Jackson and Madonna.

In 1987, Genesis received an American Music Award nomination for Favorite Pop/Rock Band, Duo, or Group. At the Brit Awards in 1987 co-producer Hugh Padgham was nominated for British Producer, while Collins was nominated for British Male Artist for his contribution to the album. In 1988, the band received one of the only two Grammy Awards issued for the short-lived Best Concept Music Video category for "Land of Confusion". It was also nominated for MTV's Video of the Year Award, but lost to their former lead vocalist Peter Gabriel's "Sledgehammer". "The Brazilian" received a Grammy Award nomination for Best Pop Instrumental Performance, but lost to the instrumental rock piece "Top Gun Anthem" by Harold Faltermeyer and Steve Stevens.

In 2007, the album was reissued with a new stereo and 5.1 surround sound mix.

== Critical reception ==
Professional ratings
Review scores
Source	Rating
AllMusic	3/5 stars
Blender	4/5 stars
Kerrang!	4.5/5 stars
The Rolling Stone Album Guide	4/5 stars
The Village Voice	C+

The album received a mixed reaction from music critics upon release. J. D. Considine gave it a positive review for Rolling Stone, stating that "every tune is carefully pruned so that each flourish delivers not an instrumental epiphany but a solid hook. Much of the credit for this belongs to Tony Banks, whose synth style has never seemed more appropriate; it's his keyboards that set the mood for 'In the Glow of the Night' and maintain the tension in 'Tonight, Tonight, Tonight'." Daniel Brogan of the Chicago Tribune was not as impressed, saying the album had "none of the inventiveness, illumination or power" of former Genesis singer Peter Gabriel's album So, released the prior month. He thought the contributions from Rutherford and Banks "seem far less apparent than usual", and that the first side of the album "could almost pass as outtakes from No Jacket Required". He concluded: "Will the Free World ever tire of Phil Collins?" Several of Brogan's criticisms were mirrored in a review from Steve Hochman of the Los Angeles Times. Hochman asked "Was this record really necessary?" and stated the album "could easily pass as a Collins album. His thin voice and familiar MOR&B songwriting dominate, with only occasional evidence of input from Rutherford and Banks". He also suggested the record "was made to provide material for the next season of Miami Vice". Associated Press writer Larry Kilman disagreed, who opened his review with "Genesis have come up with an irresistible Invisible Touch ... This is far from a Collins solo effort. The band's material is more complex than Collins' pop sound". He complimented the album's "great variety", picking out "Tonight, Tonight, Tonight" as a highlight which reminded him of "the spare, art-rock sound of the early Genesis".

In a retrospective review from Stephen Thomas Erlewine for AllMusic, the album received three stars out of five. He commented that "Invisible Touch was seen at the time as a bit of a Phil Collins solo album disguised as a Genesis album ... Genesis' poppiest album, a sleek, streamlined affair built on electronic percussion and dressed in synths" and he said "the heavy emphasis on pop tunes does serve the singer, not the band". He said that "[the] songs had big hooks that excused their coldness, and the arty moments sank to the bottom". Mark Putterford of Kerrang! remarked on how the album showed "new ideas, new sounds, but still very definitely Genesis". The Rough Guide to Rock describes Invisible Touch as "calculated and oddly emotionless AOR" and stated the hits were "by now barely distinguishable from Collins' songs as a solo artist". In 2014, Stevie Chick, writing for The Guardian, said the album's "bright, polished pop title track, the baby boomer agit-rock of 'Land of Confusion', the genuinely affecting ballad 'Throwing It All Away' – could have easily fitted on his [Collins's] solo albums". Chick reserved particular praise for "Domino", saying the track "proved a final gasp of brilliance before the blandness of 1991's We Can't Dance and 1997's inexplicable, Collins-less Calling All Stations".

Ultimate Classic Rock ranked Invisible Touch as the 13th best album by Genesis, stating "On the dark day in Genesis history when this record was released, the band fully transitioned from art-rock glory to radio-ready piffle, replete with all the worst that '80s overproduction had to offer. The fact that just the tiniest bit of the 'old' Genesis is discernible in a couple of tracks is the only thing that edges this album a notch ahead of We Can't Dance."

== Tour ==
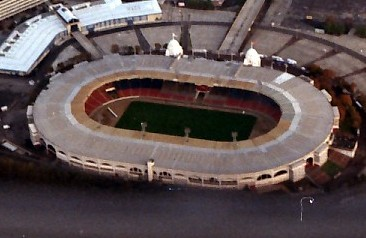
Genesis performed four shows at London's Wembley Stadium

The Invisible Touch Tour consisted of 112 shows between September 1986 and July 1987. The core trio were joined by their longtime touring musicians, drummer Chester Thompson and guitarist/bassist Daryl Stuermer. Every song on Invisible Touch was performed live during the tour, except for "Anything She Does" which was used during the show's introduction. The 1986 dates included a Genesis medley that included the final two sections of "Supper's Ready" from Foxtrot (1972). The stage production included 400 Vari-Lites which required five lorries to transport.

The tour opened with a sold out North American leg which included five nights at Madison Square Garden and also five at the Los Angeles Forum. Each date on the leg grossed an average of $300,000. The US legs were sponsored by Michelob beer. It was followed by the band's first and only tour of Australia and New Zealand; the former dates saw Genesis perform "Your Own Special Way" from Wind & Wuthering (1976) with a string section. A Chinese leg was announced, but later cancelled. The tour ended with four sold out shows at London's Wembley Stadium, totalling 288,000 people in attendance, which set a new record. The final show was a benefit in aid of The Prince's Trust and attended by Charles, Prince of Wales and Diana, Princess of Wales, a fan of the group.

Recordings from the tour were released on the live albums The Way We Walk, Volume One: The Shorts (1992) and Genesis Archive #2: 1976–1992 (2000). The Wembley shows were filmed and released on home video in 1988 entitled Invisible Touch Tour. In 2003, it was reissued on DVD and renamed Genesis Live at Wembley Stadium.

== Track listing ==
All music written and arranged by Tony Banks, Phil Collins and Mike Rutherford. Lyricists as noted.

Side one
No.	Title	Lyrics	Length
1.	"Invisible Touch"	Collins	3:29
2.	"Tonight, Tonight, Tonight"	Collins	8:53
3.	"Land of Confusion"	Rutherford	4:45
4.	"In Too Deep"	Collins	4:58
Total length:			22:05

Side two
No.	Title	Lyrics	Length
1.	"Anything She Does"	Banks	4:21
2.	"Domino": I. "In the Glow of the Night"; II. "The Last Domino"	Banks	10:44; 4:27; 6:18
3.	"Throwing It All Away"	Rutherford	3:53 (Note: The original album sleeve lists "Throwing It All Away" with an incorrect running time of 4:41.)
4.	"The Brazilian"	(instrumental)	4:50
Total length:			23:36

== Personnel ==
Credits are adapted from the album's sleeve notes.

Genesis

- Tony Banks – keyboards, synth bass
- Phil Collins – drums, percussion, vocals
- Mike Rutherford – guitars, bass

Production

- Genesis – producers
- Hugh Padgham – producer, engineer
- Paul Gomersall – assistant engineer
- Bob Ludwig – mastering at Masterdisk (New York City, New York, USA)
- Geoff Callingham – technical assistant
- Assorted Images – CD artwork production
- Baker Dave – CD artwork production
- John Swannell – photography

== Charts ==
=== Weekly charts ===
Weekly chart performance for Invisible Touch
Chart (1986–1988)	Peak position
Australian Albums (Kent Music Report)	3
Austrian Albums (Ö3 Austria)	5
Canada Top Albums/CDs (RPM)	1
Dutch Albums (Album Top 100)	2
Finnish Albums (Suomen virallinen lista)	2
French Albums (SNEP)	8
German Albums (Offizielle Top 100)	2
Italian Albums (FIMI)	5
Japanese Albums (Oricon)	9
New Zealand Albums (RMNZ)	1
Norwegian Albums (VG-lista)	3
Spanish Albums (AFYVE)	26
Swedish Albums (Sverigetopplistan)	3
Swiss Albums (Schweizer Hitparade)	3
UK Albums (Official Charts)	1
US Billboard 200	3

Chart (2024)	Peak position
Hungarian Physical Albums (MAHASZ)	10

=== Year-end charts ===
Year-end chart performance for Invisible Touch
Chart (1986)	Peak position
Australian Albums (Kent Music Report)	8
Austrian Albums (Ö3 Austria)	30
Canada Top Albums/CDs (RPM)	6
French Albums (SNEP)	7
Italian Albums (FIMI)	24
New Zealand Albums (RMNZ)	7
Swiss Albums (Schweizer Hitparade)	30
UK Albums (OCC)	14
US Billboard 200	40

Chart (1987)	Peak position
Australian Albums (Kent Music Report)	36
Austrian Albums (Ö3 Austria)	30
Canada Top Albums/CDs (RPM)	38
New Zealand Albums (RMNZ)	17
UK Albums (OCC)	18
US Billboard 200	10

=== Decade-end charts ===
Decade-end chart performance for Invisible Touch
Chart (1980–1989)	Peak position
Australian Albums (Kent Music Report)	39

== Certifications ==
Certifications for Invisible Touch
Region	Certification	Certified units/sales
Australia (ARIA)	3× Platinum	210,000^{^}
Brazil (Pro-Música Brasil)	Gold	100,000^{*}
Denmark (IFPI Danmark) original release	Platinum	100,000
Denmark (IFPI Danmark) re-release	Gold	10,000^{‡}
France (SNEP)	Platinum	300,000^{*}
Germany (BVMI)	Platinum	500,000^{^}
Hong Kong (IFPI Hong Kong)	Gold	10,000^{*}
Italy (FIMI)	Platinum	100,000^{*}
Japan (RIAJ)	Gold	128,100
Netherlands (NVPI)	Gold	50,000^{^}
New Zealand (RMNZ)	4× Platinum	60,000^{^}
Norway (IFPI Norway)	Gold	50,000
Spain (Promusicae)	Gold	50,000^{^}
Switzerland (IFPI Switzerland)	Platinum	50,000^{^}
United Kingdom (BPI)	4× Platinum	1,200,000^{^}
United States (RIAA)	6× Platinum	6,000,000^{^}
^{*} Sales figures based on certification alone.^{^} Shipments figures based on certification alone.^{‡} Sales+streaming figures based on certification alone.

== Notes and references ==
Notes

Citations

Sources

- Bowler, Dave; Dray, Bryan (1992). Genesis: A Biography. Sidgwick & Jackson Ltd. ISBN 978-0-283-06132-5.
- Banks, Tony; Collins, Phil; Gabriel, Peter; Hackett, Steve; Rutherford, Mike (2007). Dodd, Philipp (ed.). Genesis. Chapter and Verse. Weidenfeld & Nicolson. ISBN 978-0-297-84434-1.
- Collins, Phil (2016). Not Dead Yet: The Memoir. Crown Advocate. ISBN 978-1-101-90747-4.
- Banks, Tony; Collins, Phil; Rutherford, Mike (1 October 2007). Genesis 1983–1998 [Invisible Touch] (DVD). EMI Records. 5099950385126.
- Giammetti, Mario (2025). Genesis 1975 to 2025 - The Phil Collins Years. Kingmaker. ISBN 978-1-8384918-7-1.
