= Invisible Touch (song) =

1986 single by Genesis

Single by Genesis

from the album Invisible Touch
- B-side: "The Last Domino"
- Released: 19 May 1986
- Recorded: October 1985–February 1986
- Studio: The Farm (Chiddingfold, Surrey)
- Genre: Dance-rock; dance-pop
- Length: 3:27 (LP, 7-inch version); 5:58 (12-inch version)
- Label: Charisma; Virgin; Atlantic; Vertigo
- Composers: Tony Banks; Phil Collins; Mike Rutherford
- Lyricist: Phil Collins
- Producers: Genesis; Hugh Padgham

Genesis singles chronology
"Taking It All Too Hard" (1984)	"Invisible Touch" (1986)	"In Too Deep" (1986)

Music video
- "Invisible Touch" on YouTube

"Invisible Touch" is the title track and first single from the 1986 studio album of the same name by the English rock band Genesis. The song is a group composition which featured lyrics written by drummer and lead vocalist Phil Collins.

It was their first and only No. 1 single in the United States; the song additionally spent three consecutive weeks at the top of the Billboard Hot 100 Airplay chart during summer 1986 until it was surpassed by Peter Cetera's "Glory of Love". The song was the first of five consecutive US top five singles from the album of the same name. It also reached No. 4 in Canada and No. 15 in the United Kingdom. Its B-side is the second part of "Domino", titled "The Last Domino".

Collins has called it his "favourite Genesis song", and bassist and guitarist Mike Rutherford has called it "a wonderful song: upbeat, fun to play, [and] always a strong moment in any gig." As the band's only Billboard Hot 100 number one, the song is included in Rock Song Index: The 7500 Most Important Songs for the Rock and Roll Era. In 2017, ShortList's Dave Fawbert listed the song as containing "one of the greatest key changes in music history."

== History ==
Genesis "Invisible Touch" (1986)
22-second sample from Genesis's "Invisible Touch"

"Invisible Touch" came about during a jam session, Rutherford playing a guitar riff while Collins improvised the line "She seems to have an invisible touch." Collins has said he heard the influence of Prince and Sheila E. in the drum machine and his lyrics were inspired by a few people he had known who had got under his skin. Despite liking the song himself, and despite the band's previous success, he has claimed he wasn't certain the song would be a hit. Collins said that "large chunks" of the lyrics are about his first wife Andrea Bertorelli, to whom he was married from 1975 to 1980.

Cash Box called the song a "hook-laden pop workout." Billboard called it "uptempo dance-pop with a clear Collins signature." In mid-1986, "Invisible Touch" was succeeded in the No. 1 position on the Billboard Hot 100 by "Sledgehammer", performed by the former lead vocalist of Genesis, Peter Gabriel. Collins later jested about the occurrence in a 2014 interview, stating, "I read recently that Peter Gabriel knocked us off the No. 1 spot with 'Sledgehammer'. We weren't aware of that at the time. If we had been, we'd probably have sent him a telegram saying: 'Congratulations – bastard.'" The single also reached No. 1 on the US Mainstream Rock Tracks chart.

== Live versions ==
A live version of "Invisible Touch" appears on the albums The Way We Walk, Volume One: The Shorts (1992), and Live over Europe 2007, as well as on the DVDs Genesis Live at Wembley Stadium (1989), The Way We Walk – Live in Concert (1992) and When in Rome 2007.

"Invisible Touch" was performed during the Invisible Touch, We Can't Dance, Calling All Stations (with Ray Wilson on lead vocals), Turn It On Again and The Last Domino? tours. During the Turn It On Again Tour, the song was the main set finale featuring fireworks going off as the song ended. It was also the set closer on The Last Domino? Tour, but there weren't any fireworks. Collins has also performed the song on his solo tours since its release, including The First Final Farewell and Not Dead Yet tours.

Genesis also performed the song at Wembley Stadium for Live Earth. Collins's use of the word "fuck" in the song (which he had done since 1992) in front of millions of television viewers at 2pm resulted in an apology from English presenter Jonathan Ross, who vowed to give Collins a "talking to". Collins was one of several performers at the event whose offensive language caused the BBC to be censured by the media regulator Ofcom.

The song has never been performed in its original key in concert. On the Invisible Touch and We Can't Dance tours, the song was tuned down a whole step to prevent strain on Collins' voice. On the Calling All Stations tour, it was tuned down further to fit then-lead vocalist Ray Wilson's naturally deeper voice. Starting with the Turn It On Again tour, the song was gradually tuned down further with each succeeding tour to accommodate Collins' aging voice, including the Not Dead Yet and The Last Domino? tours.

== Music video ==
Genesis reunited with director Jim Yukich to make the "Invisible Touch" music video in 1986. Yukich had previously worked with Genesis on the "That's All" music video in 1983. The scene begins in a large auditorium with Collins, Rutherford and Banks goofing around with 8 mm film cameras; the video progresses to show the entire set with Collins using his own drumsticks for a microphone and the band fooling around with Yukich and the crew. The video was put into power rotation on MTV, and was number 9 on their list of the Top 100 videos of 1986.

== Personnel ==
Genesis

- Phil Collins – vocals, Oberheim DMX, Simmons SDS7
- Tony Banks – keyboards
- Mike Rutherford – electric guitar, bass guitar

== Charts ==
=== Weekly charts ===
Chart (1986)	Peak position
Australia (Kent Music Report)	3
Canada Top Singles (RPM)	6
Canada Adult Contemporary (RPM)	1
Europe (European Hot 100 Singles)	8
Finland (Suomen virallinen lista)	15
Ireland (IRMA)	7
Netherlands (Dutch Top 40 Tipparade)	2
Netherlands (Single Top 100)	28
New Zealand (Recorded Music NZ)	8
Switzerland (Schweizer Hitparade)	13
UK Singles (Official Charts)	15
US Billboard Hot 100	1
US Adult Contemporary (Billboard)	3
US Mainstream Rock Airplay (Billboard)	1
West Germany (GfK)	16
Zimbabwe (ZIMA)	11

=== Year-end charts ===
Chart (1986)	Position
Australia (Kent Music Report)	31
Canada Top Singles (RPM)	55
US Billboard Hot 100	54
US Adult Contemporary (Billboard)	41
US Top Rock Tracks (Billboard)	19

== Certifications ==
Region	Certification	Certified units/sales
Denmark (IFPI Danmark)	Gold	45,000^{‡}
New Zealand (RMNZ)	Platinum	30,000^{‡}
United Kingdom (BPI)	Platinum	600,000^{‡}
^{‡} Sales+streaming figures based on certification alone.

== Live single ==
"Invisible Touch (Live)"

Single by Genesis

from the album The Way We Walk, Volume One: The Shorts
- B-side: "Abacab" (live); "The Brazilian" (live)
- Released: 9 November 1992
- Label: Virgin
- Songwriters: Tony Banks; Phil Collins; Mike Rutherford
- Producers: Nick Davis; Robert Colby; Genesis

Genesis singles chronology
"Tell Me Why" (1992)	"Invisible Touch (Live)" (1992)	"Congo" (1997)

In 1992, "Invisible Touch" was recorded live during Genesis's 1991–1992 We Can't Dance world tour and released on limited edition 7-inch and CD near the end of the tour. Both formats were numbered and came with a booklet; the CD was housed in a box and the vinyl edition in a gatefold sleeve. The A-side is the same version found on the accompanying live album The Way We Walk, Volume One: The Shorts. The B-sides "Abacab" and "The Brazilian" were recorded during the 1987 Invisible Touch tour. The 7-inch single features an edited version of "Abacab," while the CD included complete versions of both songs.

Like the albums The Shorts and The Way We Walk, Volume Two: The Longs, and the home video The Way We Walk – Live in Concert, the title of the record was prefixed by "Genesis Live", with "(Live)" appearing as a suffix on the back sleeve and on the disc itself. Unlike the original recording of the song, this live version was a top-10 hit in the UK, reaching number seven. In one of the interview sections on the Way We Walk – Live in Concert DVD, Collins joked about re-releasing the song until it finally became a hit. It became their final single to reach the UK top 10.

=== Personnel ===
Genesis

- Phil Collins – vocals
- Tony Banks – synthesizers
- Mike Rutherford – electric guitar

Touring musicians

- Daryl Stuermer – bass
- Chester Thompson – drums

=== Charts ===
Chart (1992)	Peak position
Europe (Eurochart Hot 100)	31
Ireland (IRMA)	22
UK Singles (Official Charts)	7
UK Airplay (Music Week)	18
