= In Too Deep (Genesis song) =

Single by Genesis

from the album Invisible Touch
- B-side: "Do the Neurotic"
- Released: 18 August 1986
- Recorded: The Farm (Chiddingfold, Surrey)
- Genre: Pop
- Length: 4:58 (album version); 4:39 (UK edited version)
- Label: Atlantic; Virgin
- Songwriters: Phil Collins; Tony Banks; Mike Rutherford
- Lyricist: Phil Collins
- Producers: Genesis; Hugh Padgham

Genesis singles chronology
| "Invisible Touch" (1986) | "In Too Deep" (1986) | "Land of Confusion" (1986) |

Music video
- "In Too Deep" on YouTube

Audio
- "In Too Deep" on YouTube

"In Too Deep" is a song by the English rock band Genesis, included as the fourth track on their 13th studio album, Invisible Touch (1986). It was released as the second single from the LP in the United Kingdom and as the fifth single in the United States. The single was successful in the US, reaching No. 3 on the US Billboard Hot 100 chart and No. 1 on the Billboard Adult Contemporary chart. The song was only performed live during the 1986 North American legs during the Genesis 1986–87 Invisible Touch world tour. An October 1986 performance of the song was included on the 1992 live album The Shorts.

"In Too Deep" was written for the British neo-noir film Mona Lisa (1986) and won the "Most Performed Song from a Film" award at the BMI Film & TV Awards in 1988. It is also featured in the American horror film American Psycho (2000).

== Background ==
The lyric was written by Phil Collins after he was approached to write a song for the soundtrack of the movie Mona Lisa. The music is credited to the entire band in common with all the tracks on Invisible Touch.

== Critical reception ==
Cashbox praised Collins' "impassioned vocal."

== Music video ==
The music video for the song features the three band members playing on a minimalist set composed of steps and platforms. Tony Banks plays a grand piano, although the recording itself is mainly electric, while Mike Rutherford is on an acoustic guitar and Phil Collins is on vocals and drums.

== Charts ==
=== Weekly charts ===
| Chart (1986–1987) | Peak position |
|---|---|
| Australia (Kent Music Report) | 17 |
| Canada Top Singles (RPM) | 15 |
| Canada Adult Contemporary (RPM) | 2 |
| Europe (European Hot 100 Singles) | 30 |
| Ireland (IRMA) | 12 |
| New Zealand (Recorded Music NZ) | 30 |
| UK Singles (Official Charts) | 19 |
| US Billboard Hot 100 | 3 |
| US Adult Contemporary (Billboard) | 1 |
| US Mainstream Rock (Billboard) | 25 |
| West Germany (GfK) | 55 |

=== Year-end charts ===
| Chart (1987) | Position |
|---|---|
| US Billboard Hot 100 | 47 |

== In popular culture ==
In 2000, the American horror film American Psycho, Patrick Bateman (played by Christian Bale) describes the song as "the most moving pop song of the 1980s, about monogamy and commitment. The song is extremely uplifting. The lyrics are as positive and affirmative as anything I've heard in rock."
