= The Last Domino? Tour =

2021–22 concert tour by Genesis

- Tour by Genesis
- Promotional logo for the tour
- Start date: 20 September 2021
- End date: 26 March 2022
- Legs: 3
- No. of shows: 47 (55 scheduled)

Genesis concert chronology
- Turn It On Again: The Tour (2007); The Last Domino? Tour (2021–22)

The Last Domino? Tour was the final concert tour by the English rock band Genesis, staged between 20 September 2021 and 26 March 2022 following the announcement of their reunion after a 13-year hiatus. It featured the core trio of keyboardist Tony Banks, drummer/singer Phil Collins, and bassist/guitarist Mike Rutherford, the most commercially successful line-up in the band's history, with Daryl Stuermer on guitars and bass, Collins's son Nic on drums, and Daniel Pearce and Patrick Smyth on backing vocals.

The band told BBC News they were doing the tour in order to "put it to bed". The tour comprised 47 shows across Europe and North America, marking the first Genesis performances since the trio reunited for the Turn It On Again Tour in 2007. The UK leg was rescheduled three times due to the COVID-19 pandemic, with the London gigs rescheduled a fourth time.

== Background ==
In October 2007, the trio line-up of Phil Collins, Tony Banks, and Mike Rutherford completed the Turn It On Again Tour, after which the group entered a 13-year hiatus. During this time, the three reunited with former members Peter Gabriel and Steve Hackett in the 2014 documentary Genesis: Together and Apart. Between 2011 and 2015, the five expressed mixed opinions about a reunion of the five-piece line-up of the band. A return to group activity became possible when Collins ended a five-year retirement from music in 2015 and embarked on his Not Dead Yet Tour, which ended in 2019 and featured his son Nic Collins on drums. Banks and Rutherford attended one of the shows in London, after which they expressed an interest in touring with Collins again. Later in the tour, Rutherford joined Collins on stage to perform the Genesis song "Follow You Follow Me". Collins said that The Last Domino? Tour would be his final with the group. Banks was initially open to the band possibly continuing, depending on how the members and the audience received the tour, though he later said that after the 2022 dates, "that will be it."

== Development ==
=== Rehearsals ===
On 22 January 2020, the trio were spotted at a basketball game in New York City, which prompted speculations of a potential reunion. Banks said later that the band had spent some time in the city to discuss the possibility of another tour, while publicly claiming they were together just for a mutual friend's wedding. Banks said that Gabriel and Hackett had not been contacted to participate, reasoning the difficulty in getting Gabriel on board to do the tour. Rehearsals took place with Nic Collins and Genesis's longtime live guitarist Daryl Stuermer. The first songs they played were "Land of Confusion" and "No Son of Mine" as they were considered not technically difficult. Banks praised Nic's drumming style, which he compared to a young Phil, and said his approach gave the group the opportunity to perform songs that they had previously avoided. Rutherford was pleased with the sound that they achieved during these sessions, which he compared as darker to his side group, Mike + the Mechanics, and picked the instrumental sections as particularly strong. American musician Dave Kerzner, who had assisted Banks with his keyboard rig for the 2007 tour, was hired to update Banks's set-ups with longtime Genesis associates, technical assistant Geoff Callingham and producer Nick Davis.

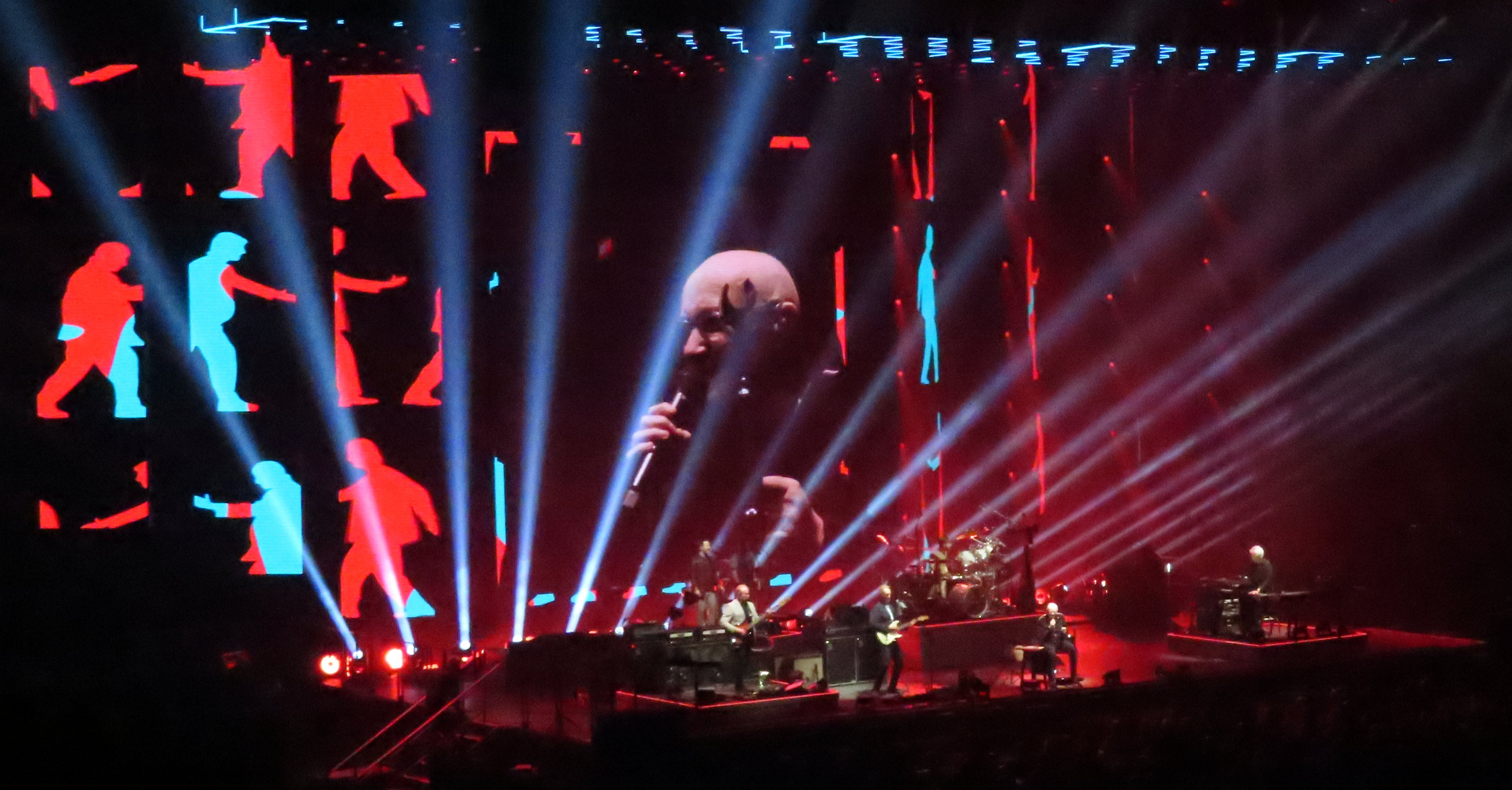
The tour featured an elaborate stage presentation with visuals and lights

The success of the initial try-outs in New York City led to the group's decision to enter full production rehearsals in October and November 2020, which were planned to take place in Miami, Florida before they relocated to LH2 Studios in west London. Prog magazine received permission to attend a session and photographed the group at work. Patrick Woodroffe, who had worked on the 2007 tour, was rehired as show director. The stage design involved a lighting system, a large video screen, and fog effects to interpret the music. As Woodroffe had previously worked with Genesis and befriended the group, he had a clear idea as to what kind of lighting would suit them and knew that they are "musicians first and foremost." At the time of the London rehearsals, Genesis had worked through as many as 24 songs for a proposed two-hour show. A typical daily schedule involved a brief sound check, followed by the group performing the entire set without a break, partly to help Collins strengthen his vocals. Woodroffe and his team observed the production and made notes on any necessary changes to lighting or video cues. The band agreed to have a "very little" amount of live shots of members performing on the screen to place greater emphasis on the visuals. On the final two days of production rehearsals, a 20-person film crew were hired to film Genesis performing the set.

Rolling Stone reported that the setlist was "a closely-guarded secret". At the time of the tour's announcement, Collins said that songs "based more on my drumming" would not be performed, and he added that despite his inability to play the drums due to ill health, "I'll be doing my best to play some bits" alongside Nic. Nic Collins said the group rehearsed songs that he had "known for ages" and was familiar with "Firth of Fifth" and "I Know What I Like (In Your Wardrobe)" from Selling England by the Pound (1973), but he had to learn songs he was also unfamiliar with, a process which made him a bigger Genesis fan than before. He revealed that "Los Endos" from A Trick of the Tail (1976) and the final ten minutes of the 23-minute epic "Supper's Ready" from Foxtrot (1972) were rehearsed, but did not say if they were chosen in the final running order. The tour was the band's first not to feature material from A Trick of the Tail since its release.

=== Tour announcement and dates ===
On 3 March 2020, BBC Radio 2 advertised on Twitter that "a massive band" is to announce their reunion on the following morning's edition of The Radio 2 Breakfast Show with host Zoe Ball. The trio were revealed as live guests and announced their reformation and the tour, which initially comprised 10 dates in Ireland and the UK between 16 November and 11 December 2020. The tour is named after the second part of the song "Domino" from Invisible Touch (1986). Banks suggested to add the question mark at the end. Earlier that week, a picture of the trio was posted on the group's official Instagram page with the caption: "And then there were three.", a reference to ...And Then There Were Three... (1978), their first album recorded as a three-piece.

Pre-sale tickets went on sale at on 5 March 2020 for O_{2} Priority and Live Nation members, followed by a general sale on 6 March from 9 a.m. The first wave of general sale tickets sold out within ten minutes, which prompted the addition of six dates after one hour to meet demand. One extra show was added in Liverpool, Newcastle, Leeds, Birmingham, Manchester, and Glasgow, bringing the total number of shows to 16. On 9 March a second show in Dublin, scheduled for 17 November, was added. On 24 July 2020, the tour was rescheduled due to the COVID-19 pandemic with the new dates taking place between 1 and 30 April 2021. On the same day, an additional date in Birmingham on 7 April and in London on 30 April was added, bringing the total number to 19. On 22 January 2021, the 19 shows were rescheduled once more, this time from 15 September to 13 October. On the same day, Genesis released a 50-second preview video of the filmed rehearsals, revealing their chosen stage design. The video revealed the group playing the opening to "Behind the Lines" from Duke (1980) and, for the first time in their history, performing with two backing vocalists.

In April 2021, Rutherford said that dates in the United States were possible for late 2021 and that the group "are confident, they want to do it." On 29 April, the band announced 14 dates in the United States and Canada between 15 November and 15 December, with pre-sale tickets going on sale on 7 May, followed by general sale on 9 May, only through Ticketmaster. This brought the total number of concerts to 33. On 6 May, an extra show in Chicago, Montreal, and New York City was added due to demand, followed by an extra show in Philadelphia and Boston on 10 May. A second date in Toronto was added on 25 May. In June, the band's first ever date in Raleigh, North Carolina was announced for 19 November, bringing the total number of shows to 40.

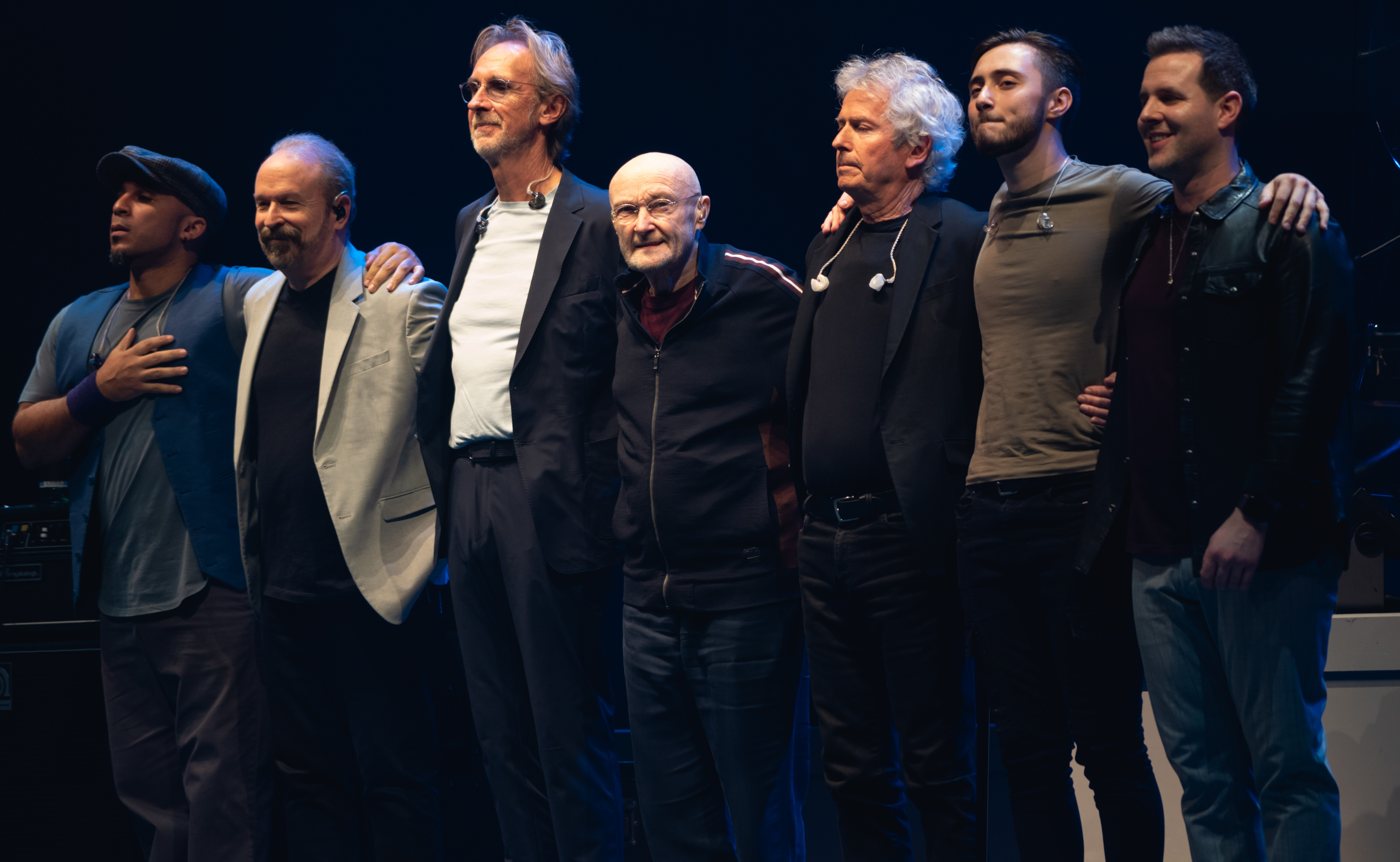
The band taking a bow at the final show

In September 2021, the three dates in Ireland and Northern Ireland were postponed indefinitely due to the pandemic. On 8 October, the last four dates of the UK leg were postponed after Rutherford tested positive for COVID-19. The three London shows were rescheduled for 24–26 March 2022. Due to demand, Genesis announced an extra date for 11 December 2021 at the Barclays Center in New York City, however the show was later cancelled, with the official reason given at the time being "unforeseen circumstances", however multiple sources later told Billboard that technical difficulties with the venue's then-ticketing outlet, SeatGeek, and lower than expected tickets sales were the reason for the cancelation, which were cited as a reason for the venue ending their partnership with SeatGeek earlier than expected. On 25 October 2021, Genesis announced a European leg covering Germany, France, and the Netherlands between 7–22 March 2022. Those shows were followed by the three rescheduled dates in London, bringing the total number of shows to 47. The final show, held on 26 March 2022, marked the 46th anniversary of the first Genesis concert with Collins as lead vocalist, which took place in London, Ontario in 1976. (This date was also coincidentally the 13th anniversary of the passing of former Genesis drummer John Mayhew.) Gabriel and Genesis' former tour manager Richard Macphail were present backstage.

=== Compilation album and documentary ===
On 29 July 2021, Genesis announced a companion greatest hits album, The Last Domino? – The Hits, containing the studio versions of songs released between 1973 and 1991. The album was released on 17 September.

On 1 September 2021, a one-hour documentary covering the rehearsals and the band preparing for the tour became available on various PBS television stations in the United States. It features band interviews, behind the scenes footage, and live performances of various songs from the professionally filmed set in late 2020. The documentary aired in the UK on Sky Arts on 12 September, and had a DVD release on 2 November.

=== Gross ===
The 2021 dates alone saw Genesis sell 134,323 tickets and gross $23,743,403. The tour received a nomination for a Billboard Music Award in the Top Tour and Top Rock Tour categories, but it lost both to the No Filter Tour by the Rolling Stones.

== Set list ==
Main set

1. "Duke's Intro" ("Behind the Lines"/"Duke's End")
2. "Turn It On Again"
3. "Mama"
4. "Land of Confusion"
5. "Home by the Sea" / "Second Home by the Sea"
6. Medley:
  1. "Fading Lights" (first two verses only)
  2. "The Cinema Show" (instrumental section only)
  3. "...In That Quiet Earth" (teaser)
  4. "Afterglow"
7. "That's All" (acoustic)
8. "The Lamb Lies Down on Broadway" (acoustic, truncated)
9. "Follow You Follow Me" (acoustic)
10. "Duchess" (replaced with "Misunderstanding" on 15 and 16 November 2021)
11. "No Son of Mine"
12. "Firth of Fifth" (instrumental section only)
13. "I Know What I Like (In Your Wardrobe)"
14. "Domino"
15. "Throwing It All Away"
16. "Tonight, Tonight, Tonight" (shortened)
17. "Invisible Touch"
  Encore
18. "I Can't Dance"
19. "Dancing with the Moonlit Knight" (intro and first verse only)
20. "The Carpet Crawlers"

== Equipment ==
Phil Collins:

- Tambourine
  - Behind the Lines/Dukes End
  - That’s all
  - I Know What You Like
- Mic:
  - Vocals: sE Electronics v7

Mike Rutherford:

Guitars:

- Gibson EDS-1275/Yamaha TRB-4P Double Neck
  - Fading Distant Lights
  - Cinema Show
  - Afterglow
  - Duchess
- Fender Eric Clapton Signature Stratocaster (Pewter)
  - Home by the Sea
  - Second Home By the Sea
  - Land of Confusion
  - Mama
  - No Son of Mine
  - Domino
  - Throwing it all away
  - Tonight Tonight Tonight
  - Invisible Touch
  - I Can’t Dance
  - Carpet Crawlers
- Fender EC Stratocaster (red)
  - Turn it on again
- Fender Acoustasonic Stratocaster (Natural finish)
  - Follow You Follow Me
- Yamaha TRB-4P Bass
  - Behind the Lines/ Dukes End
  - That’s All
  - A Lamb Lies Down on Broadway
  - Fifth of Firth
  - I Know What You Like
- Moog Taurus III
  - Duchess
  - Afterglow

Microphones:

- Audio-Technica AT 4040 (Guitar)

- Shure SM57 (Guitar)

-Yamaha Subkick (Bass)

Daryl Stuermer:

Guitars:

- Fender Acoustasonic Stratocaster, (Red Finish)
  - That’s All
  - A Lamb Lies Down on Broadway
- Yamaha TRB-4P
  - Follow You Follow me
- Godin DS-1 Daryl Stuermer custom signature model
  - Behind the Lines/Dukes End
  - Cinema Show
  - Duchess
  - Fifth of Firth
  - Carpet Crawlers
- Lakeland custom bass
  - Turn it on again
  - mama
  - Land of Confusion
  - Home by the Sea
  - Second Home by the Sea
  - No Son of Mine
  - Domino
  - Throwing it all Away
  - Tonight Tonight Tonight
  - Invisible Touch
  - I Can’t Dance.
- Moog Taurus III
  - Tonight Tonight Tonight
  - Turn it on again (unconfirmed)

Microphones:

- Audio-Technica AT 4040 (Guitar)

-Yamaha Subkick (Bass)

Tony Banks

Keys/Synth

- OASYS-76 wavestation synth
- Korg 01/W FD
- Roland A-88 mk.2 keyboard MIDI controller

Nic Collins

Cymbals (Sabian):

- 14" AAX Medium hi-hats
- 8" HHX O-Zone Splash
- 12" AAX Splash
- 10" Artisan Splash(?)
- 18" Artisan Crash (Brilliant)
- 19" Artisan Crash (Brilliant)
- 20" Artisan Crash (Brilliant)
- 24" AAX ride
- 19" HHX Complex O-Zone crash (Brilliant)
- 21" AA Holy China (Brilliant)

Gretsch Drums

- 18" x 22" Bass Drum
- 5.5" x 8" concert tom
- 6" x 10" concert tom
- 8" x 12" concert tom
- 12" x 15" concert tom
- 16" x 16" floor tom
- 18" x 18" floor tom
- 6.5" x 14" Broadkaster Snare Drum
- 6" x 13" Hammered Chrome Over Brass Snare

Microphones

- Kick:
  - Shure Beta 52A
  - Shure Beta 91A (inside)
- Snare:
  - Shure SM57 (top & bottom)
- Hi-hat:
  - Neumann KM84
- Toms:
  - Sennheiser 904s
- Overheads:
  - Audio-Technica AT 4050s

Mixing System/PA

- Avid S6L (FOH Console)
- Waves & Sonox plugins
- Waves LV-1 production console /w DiGiGrid IOC ethernet audio cables
- L-Acoustics X8 loudspeaker
- L-Acoustics SB-15m
- L-Acoustics LA12x power amplifiers
- L-Acoustics LS10 AVB switches
- L-Acoustics P1-AVB processors
- L-Acoustics A10
- L-Acoustics A15s
- L-Acoustics X8s
- L-Acoustics K1s
- L-Acoustics K2s (x3)
- L-Acoustics Kara boxes
- L-Acoustics A-15s
- L-Acoustics KS28s

== Tour dates ==
List of 2021 concerts
Date	City	Country	Venue	Attendance	Revenue
20 September 2021	Birmingham	England	Utilita Arena Birmingham	29,550 / 33,993	$4,889,026
21 September 2021	Birmingham	England	Utilita Arena Birmingham	29,550 / 33,993	$4,889,026
22 September 2021	Birmingham	England	Utilita Arena Birmingham	29,550 / 33,993	$4,889,026
24 September 2021	Manchester	England	AO Arena	21,014 / 24,092	$3,552,433
25 September 2021	Manchester	England	AO Arena	21,014 / 24,092	$3,552,433
27 September 2021	Leeds	England	First Direct Arena	18,172 / 20,880	$2,955,050
28 September 2021	Leeds	England	First Direct Arena	18,172 / 20,880	$2,955,050
30 September 2021	Newcastle	England	Utilita Arena Newcastle	13,513 / 15,956	$2,088,676
1 October 2021	Newcastle	England	Utilita Arena Newcastle	13,513 / 15,956	$2,088,676
3 October 2021	Liverpool	England	M&S Bank Arena	17,086 / 19,064	$2,857,326
4 October 2021	Liverpool	England	M&S Bank Arena	17,086 / 19,064	$2,857,326
7 October 2021	Glasgow	Scotland	OVO Hydro	9,860 / 10,918	$1,807,793
15 November 2021	Chicago	United States	United Center	25,128 / 25,128	$5,593,099
16 November 2021	Chicago	United States	United Center	25,128 / 25,128	$5,593,099
18 November 2021	Washington, D.C.	United States	Capital One Arena	12,625 / 12,625	$2,892,389
19 November 2021	Raleigh	United States	PNC Arena	9,260 / 12,500	$1,562,311
20 November 2021	Charlotte	United States	Spectrum Center	13,620 / 13,620	$3,041,216
22 November 2021	Montreal	Canada	Bell Centre	26,440 / 26,440	$5,309,342
23 November 2021	Montreal	Canada	Bell Centre	26,440 / 26,440	$5,309,342
25 November 2021	Toronto	Canada	Scotiabank Arena	21,407 / 23,500	$3,808,967
26 November 2021	Toronto	Canada	Scotiabank Arena	21,407 / 23,500	$3,808,967
27 November 2021	Buffalo	United States	KeyBank Center	12,440 / 12,440	$2,700,872
29 November 2021	Detroit	United States	Little Caesars Arena	10,501 / 11,200	$2,279,575
30 November 2021	Cleveland	United States	Rocket Mortgage FieldHouse	13,917 / 13,917	$2,696,885
2 December 2021	Philadelphia	United States	Wells Fargo Center	26,846 / 26,846	$5,208,680
3 December 2021	Philadelphia	United States	Wells Fargo Center	26,846 / 26,846	$5,208,680
5 December 2021	New York City	United States	Madison Square Garden	23,160 / 23,160	$5,314,783
6 December 2021	New York City	United States	Madison Square Garden	23,160 / 23,160	$5,314,783
8 December 2021	Columbus	United States	Nationwide Arena	12,597 / 12,597	$2,731,467
10 December 2021	Elmont	United States	UBS Arena	12,309 / 12,309	$2,537,585
13 December 2021	Pittsburgh	United States	PPG Paints Arena	10,492 / 11,234	$2,094,285
15 December 2021	Boston	United States	TD Garden	21,746 / 21,746	$4,180,975
16 December 2021	Boston	United States	TD Garden	21,746 / 21,746	$4,180,975

List of 2022 concerts
Date	City	Country	Venue	Attendance	Revenue
7 March 2022	Berlin	Germany	Mercedes-Benz Arena	20,276 / 20,276	$3,268,059
8 March 2022	Berlin	Germany	Mercedes-Benz Arena	20,276 / 20,276	$3,268,059
10 March 2022	Hanover	Germany	ZAG-Arena	19,586 / 19,586	$3,062,865
11 March 2022	Hanover	Germany	ZAG-Arena	19,586 / 19,586	$3,062,865
13 March 2022	Cologne	Germany	Lanxess Arena	42,093 / 42,111 (Note: Boxscore data is combined for shows on 13, 14 and 19 March 2019.)	$5,597,101
14 March 2022	Cologne	Germany	Lanxess Arena	42,093 / 42,111	$5,597,101
16 March 2022	Paris	France	La Défense Arena	45,889 / 45,889	$7,215,967
17 March 2022	Paris	France	La Défense Arena	45,889 / 45,889	$7,215,967
19 March 2022	Cologne	Germany	Lanxess Arena	—	—
21 March 2022	Amsterdam	Netherlands	Ziggo Dome	26,168 / 26,168	$3,150,976
22 March 2022	Amsterdam	Netherlands	Ziggo Dome	26,168 / 26,168	$3,150,976
24 March 2022	London	England	The O_{2} Arena	43,648 / 43,648	$7,794,137
25 March 2022	London	England	The O_{2} Arena	43,648 / 43,648	$7,794,137
26 March 2022	London	England	The O_{2} Arena	43,648 / 43,648	$7,794,137
TOTAL				559,343 / 581,833 (96%)	$100,191,840

== Cancelled shows ==
Date	City	Country	Venue	Reason
15 September 2021	Dublin	Ireland	3Arena	COVID-19 pandemic
16 September 2021	Dublin	Ireland	3Arena	COVID-19 pandemic
18 September 2021	Belfast	Northern Ireland	SSE Arena Belfast	COVID-19 pandemic
8 October 2021	Glasgow	Scotland	OVO Hydro	Positive COVID-19 test within the band
11 October 2021	London	England	The O_{2} Arena	Positive COVID-19 test within the band
12 October 2021	London	England	The O_{2} Arena	Positive COVID-19 test within the band
13 October 2021	London	England	The O_{2} Arena	Positive COVID-19 test within the band
11 December 2021	Brooklyn	United States	Barclays Center	Unforeseen circumstances (Note: Multiple sources later told Billboard that lower than expected ticket sales and technical difficulties with SeatGeek were the reason for the show's cancelation.)

== Personnel ==
Genesis

- Tony Banks – keyboards
- Phil Collins – lead vocals
- Mike Rutherford – guitar, bass, bass pedals, backing vocals

Additional musicians

- Nic Collins – drums, percussion
- Daryl Stuermer – guitar, bass
- Daniel Pearce – backing vocals, additional percussion
- Patrick Smyth – backing vocals

Crew

Michel Colin- FOH Mixer

Gavin Tempany- Assistant FOH Mixer
