= Anything She Does =

Song by Genesis

from the album Invisible Touch
- Released: 6 June 1986
- Recorded: 1986
- Studio: The Farm (Chiddingfold, Surrey)
- Genre: Pop rock; soul
- Length: 4:07 (LP/Cassette)
- Label: Atlantic
- Composers: Tony Banks; Phil Collins; Mike Rutherford
- Lyricist: Tony Banks
- Producers: Genesis; Hugh Padgham

Music video
- "Anything She Does" on YouTube

"Anything She Does" is a song by the English rock band Genesis. It appears as the fifth track on their thirteenth studio album Invisible Touch (1986), opening the second side of the vinyl and cassette editions. The lyrics were written by their keyboardist Tony Banks.

Lyrically, the song is about a man who is in love with a pin-up girl. He feels the pain that he can never have a relationship with her in real life, instead of his imagination. AllMusic has described the song's words as "a humorous look at pin-up models". The brass sound in the song is played on an E-mu Emulator II by Banks. According to Banks, the sample itself is "from some tape I found lying around," and was not taken from a horn chart of one of the band's previous songs ("Paperlate"), which featured the Earth, Wind & Fire horn section.

"Anything She Does" was the only track from Invisible Touch that the band did not perform live on their subsequent tour. Banks stated in the documentary portion of their Visible Touch home video that it was too difficult to play.

Although not released as a commercial single, the song reached #40 on the Billboard Mainstream Rock chart.

== Music video ==
Though not released as a single, a music video of the song exists. It was produced by Paul Flattery and directed by Jim Yukich (of FYI – Flattery Yukich, Inc.) and features the English comedian Benny Hill (in his "Fred Scuttle" characterization) as a bumbling security guard whom many fans sneak past to get backstage while the band rehearses. He later finds the people who have sneaked past him have made a mess of the hospitality room, yet manages to clear them all out and restore the room to its original condition just as the band returns to see it. Interspersed with footage of the band rehearsing, the clip is essentially a 6-minute musical Benny Hill sketch, complete with his trademark "Running Gag" near the end.

The video was used to introduce the band during the Invisible Touch Tour. It features the Page 3 models Maria Whittaker and Suzanne Mizzi.

Another point of interest is that a 'lookalike' of the late Princess Diana appears in the video briefly.

== Personnel ==
Genesis

- Tony Banks – keyboards
- Phil Collins – vocals, drums
- Mike Rutherford – electric guitar, bass guitar
