= Tonight, Tonight, Tonight =

1987 single by Genesis

Single by Genesis

from the album Invisible Touch
- B-side: "In the Glow of the Night"
- Released: 29 January 1987
- Studio: The Farm (Surrey)
- Genre: Art rock
- Length: 8:50 (album version); 4:32 (7-inch version)
- Label: Virgin
- Songwriters: Tony Banks; Phil Collins; Mike Rutherford
- Producers: Genesis; Hugh Padgham

Genesis singles chronology
"Land of Confusion" (1986)	"Tonight, Tonight, Tonight" (1987)	"Throwing It All Away" (1987)

"Tonight, Tonight, Tonight" is the second track on the 1986 album Invisible Touch by the English rock band Genesis, released in January 1987 as the fourth single from the album. It peaked at No. 3 in the US and No. 18 in the UK.

== Background and composition ==
In a documentary on the making of Invisible Touch, Phil Collins revealed that the song originated from a LinnDrum pattern he created. Tony Banks added an ominous chord progression, establishing the song's dark tone and inspiring its lyrics, which depict a drug addict's struggle to contact their dealer for another fix. The lyrics explore themes of addiction ("a load on your back that you can't see," "shake it loose"), desperation ("I've got to get it to you," "I keep calling but you're never home"), and eventual anguish ("now I'm in too deep," "please get me out of here!"). Collins intensified the emotional climax with dramatic drum fills featuring his signature gated reverb. The album version extends to nearly nine minutes, including a refrain and keyboard solo, which were cut from the single and radio edit.

The song's working title was "Monkey, Zulu".

== Versions ==
The single included an edited version (at 4:32) and the first part of "Domino" ("In the Glow of the Night") as the B-side. A new edit of the single version was released on the 1999 compilation Turn It On Again: The Hits (as well as its "sequel" The Tour Edition) and later on The Platinum Collection. This revised edit features a different cross fade and different edit points as compared to the original 1987 edit version. Some singles that included the full version of the song included the second part of "Domino" ("The Last Domino") as the B-side. Other releases contained the song "Paperlate" and a 12" remix of "Tonight, Tonight, Tonight". The full live version from the Live at Wembley Stadium video was included as a B-side on the "Never A Time" CD single.

The song was performed on the Invisible Touch Tour. A shorter version (which segued into "Invisible Touch") was played on the We Can't Dance, Turn It On Again, and The Last Domino? tours, albeit transposed down a key to account for the deepening of Phil Collins's voice.

== Reception ==
Cash Box said it has a "remote, eery...ambiance that features Phil Collins' emotional singing and propulsive drumming."

== In popular culture ==
The song was used in a commercial for Michelob, who sponsored the Invisible Touch Tour. In 2019, Andy Greene of Rolling Stone remarked, "You don't hear the 1986 Genesis song 'Tonight Tonight Tonight' very often these days, but back then it was absolutely inescapable. This was a weird period of time where seemingly half the songs on the radio were either by Genesis or one of the many offshoot acts like Phil Collins, Peter Gabriel, Mike and the Mechanics, or GTR."

== Music video ==
The music video for the song was shot in the Bradbury Building in Los Angeles.

== Track listing ==
7": Virgin / GENS 4 United Kingdom

1. "Tonight, Tonight, Tonight" (Edit) – 4:32
2. "In The Glow of the Night"

12": Virgin / GENSG 4–12 United Kingdom

1. "Tonight, Tonight, Tonight" (Edit) – 4:32
2. "In The Glow of the Night"
3. "Tonight, Tonight, Tonight" (12" Potoker Remix)
- gatefold sleeve

12": Virgin / GENS 4–12 United Kingdom

1. "Tonight, Tonight, Tonight" (Edit) – 4:32
2. "In The Glow of the Night"
3. "Paperlate"
4. "Tonight, Tonight, Tonight" (12" Potoker Remix)

CD: Virgin / CDEP1 United Kingdom

1. "Tonight, Tonight, Tonight" (Edit) – 4:32
2. "In The Glow of the Night" (Domino 'Part One')
3. "Paperlate"
4. "Tonight, Tonight, Tonight" (12" Potoker Remix)

Note: A rare withdrawn UK CD-single contained "Invisible Touch" (Extended Remix)" instead of "Paperlate"

== Personnel ==
Genesis

- Tony Banks – keyboards, synth bass
- Phil Collins – vocals, drums, LinnDrum, Simmons SDSV, percussion
- Mike Rutherford – electric guitars

== Charts ==
=== Weekly charts ===
Chart (1987)	Peak position
Australia (Australian Music Report)	93
Belgium (Ultratop 50 Flanders)	40
Canada Top Singles (RPM)	19
Europe (European Hot 100 Singles)	15
Ireland (IRMA)	9
New Zealand (Recorded Music NZ)	42
UK Singles (Official Charts)	18
US Billboard Hot 100	3
US Adult Contemporary (Billboard)	8
US Mainstream Rock (Billboard)	9
West Germany (GfK)	23

=== Year-end charts ===
Chart (1987)	Position
US Billboard Hot 100	68
