= Fir Tree =

Fir Tree may refer to:

- A tree of the genus Abies
- Fir Tree, County Durham, a village in England
- Fir Tree, Washington, an unincorporated community in the United States

== See also ==
- Dennert Fir Tree, a signboard used in the Harz mountains in Germany
- Fir Tree Copse, a nature reserve in Surrey, England
- "The Fir Tree", a Moomin short story by Tove Jansson
- "The Fir-Tree", an 1844 fairy tale by Hans Christian Andersen
