= Domino (Genesis song) =

Song by Genesis

from the album Invisible Touch
- Released: 6 June 1986
- Recorded: 1985 – 1986
- Studio: The Farm (Chiddingfold, Surrey)
- Genre: Progressive rock; art rock; electronic rock
- Length: 10:45; 4:27 ("In the Glow of the Night"); 6:18 ("The Last Domino")
- Label: Atlantic (US); Virgin (UK)
- Composers: Tony Banks; Phil Collins; Mike Rutherford
- Lyricist: Tony Banks
- Producers: Genesis; Hugh Padgham

Official audio
- "Domino" on YouTube

"Domino" is a song written by the English rock band Genesis for their thirteenth studio album Invisible Touch (1986). The song was the sixth track on the album. The music was written by the band, while the lyrics were written by their keyboardist Tony Banks. The song is divided into two parts, "In the Glow of the Night" and "The Last Domino".

The song, though not released as a single, charted at No. 29 on the US Mainstream Rock chart.

The B-side of the "Tonight, Tonight, Tonight" single was the first half of this song, "In the Glow of the Night", while the B-side of "Invisible Touch" was the second part of the song, "The Last Domino".

During a clip titled "Tony talks about his inspiration" on the live DVD When in Rome 2007 (2008), Banks states that his inspiration for the song lyrics was the Lebanese Civil War, which was still being contested prior to the recording of Invisible Touch. He set the action in a hotel room in Beirut, minutes after bombs start to fall on the city.

== Live performances ==
Before the song was performed, Phil Collins would talk to the audience about the Domino Principle and demonstrate it by stating that something that might happen to the people in one section, might affect the people in another section (with the lights lighting up that section of the audience) multiple times.

It was performed on the Invisible Touch, We Can't Dance, Calling All Stations (with Ray Wilson on lead vocals), Turn It On Again and The Last Domino? tours.

A live version appears on their albums The Way We Walk, Volume Two: The Longs, and Live over Europe 2007 (simply titled "Domino") as well as corresponding DVDs Genesis Live at Wembley Stadium, The Way We Walk and When in Rome 2007.

== Critical reception ==
In 2014, Stevie Chick of The Guardian chose "Domino" as one of the ten best Genesis songs and the highlight of the Invisible Touch album, describing it as "a fusion of everything Genesis had ever been and now become: an 11-minute multi-part epic played with the minimal attack of 'Abacab', the haunting 'In the Glow of the Night' giving way to the anthemic synth-rock bombast of 'The Last Domino'".

== Personnel ==
Genesis

- Tony Banks – keyboards, synth bass on "The Last Domino"
- Phil Collins – vocals, drums, LinnDrum, Simmons drums
- Mike Rutherford – electric guitars, bass guitar on "In the Glow of the Night"

== Chart performance ==
Chart (1986)	Peak position
US Mainstream Rock (Billboard)	29
