= The Way We Walk, Volume One: The Shorts =

Live album by Genesis
- Released: 16 November 1992
- Recorded: 1986, 1987, 1992
- Genre: Rock
- Length: 63:05
- Labels: Virgin, Atlantic
- Producers: Nick Davis; Robert Colby; Genesis

Genesis chronology
We Can't Dance (1991)	The Way We Walk, Volume One: The Shorts (1992)	The Way We Walk, Volume Two: The Longs (1993)

Singles from The Way We Walk
- 1. "Invisible Touch" Released: 9 November 1992

Professional ratings
Review scores
Source	Rating
AllMusic	3/5 stars
Calgary Herald	C
Entertainment Weekly	B
The Rolling Stone Album Guide	3/5 stars
Select	1/5 medals

Live – The Way We Walk, Volume One: The Shorts is the fourth live album by the English rock band Genesis, released on 16 November 1992 on Virgin Records in the United Kingdom and by Atlantic Records in the United States. The album features a compilation of recordings from their 1986–1987 Invisible Touch Tour and their 1992 We Can't Dance Tour in support of their named studio albums, with focus on the group's hit singles. In addition to the core Genesis line-up of singer/drummer Phil Collins, keyboardist Tony Banks, and guitarist/bassist Mike Rutherford, the group perform with their longtime touring musicians, drummer Chester Thompson and guitarist/bassist Daryl Stuermer.

The album reached No. 3 in the United Kingdom and No. 35 in the United States, where the album reached Gold certification from the Recording Industry Association of America (RIAA) for shipment of 500,000 copies. In January 1993, Genesis released the companion album The Way We Walk, Volume Two: The Longs, which focuses on the band's lengthier material from their We Can't Dance Tour.

== Track listing ==
All songs written by Tony Banks, Phil Collins, and Mike Rutherford.

No.	Title	Recording date and location	Length
1.	"Land of Confusion"	11 July 1992 at Niedersachsenstadion, Hannover, Germany	5:16
2.	"No Son of Mine"	13 July 1992 at Niedersachsenstadion, Hannover, Germany	7:06
3.	"Jesus He Knows Me"	11 July 1992	5:24
4.	"Throwing It All Away"	13 July 1992 at Niedersachsenstadion, Hannover, Germany, and 2 August 1992 at Knebworth Park, Knebworth, England	6:02
5.	"I Can't Dance"	13 July 1992	6:54
6.	"Mama"	3 July 1987 at Wembley Stadium, London, England	6:50
7.	"Hold on My Heart"	13 July 1992	5:41
8.	"That's All"	3 July 1987	4:59
9.	"In Too Deep"	October 1986 The Forum, Los Angeles, United States	5:36
10.	"Tonight, Tonight, Tonight"	13 July 1992	3:36
11.	"Invisible Touch"	13 July 1992	5:41

== Personnel ==
Genesis

- Phil Collins – lead vocals, percussion
- Tony Banks – keyboards, backing vocals
- Mike Rutherford – guitars, bass guitar, backing vocals

Additional musicians

- Daryl Stuermer – bass guitar, guitar, backing vocals
- Chester Thompson – percussion, drums

Production

- Nick Davis – production, engineering
- Robert Colby – production
- Genesis – production, album design
- Geoff Callingham – engineering
- Simon Metcalfe – engineering assistance
- Icon – album design
- Louis Lee – photography
- Cesar Vera – photography

== Charts ==
=== Weekly charts ===
Chart (1992–1996)	Peak position
Australian Albums (ARIA)	37
Austrian Albums (Ö3 Austria)	8
Belgian Albums (Ultratop Wallonia)	28
Canada Top Albums/CDs (RPM)	20
Dutch Albums (Album Top 100)	18
German Albums (Offizielle Top 100)	2
Japanese Albums (Oricon)	59
New Zealand Albums (RMNZ)	2
Swedish Albums (Sverigetopplistan)	40
Swiss Albums (Schweizer Hitparade)	4
UK Albums (Official Charts)	3
US Billboard 200	35

=== Year-end charts ===
Chart (1993)	Position
German Albums (Offizielle Top 100)	41
New Zealand Albums (RMNZ)	31
Swiss Albums (Schweizer Hitparade)	33
US Billboard 200	100

== Certifications ==
Region	Certification	Certified units/sales
Canada (Music Canada)	Gold	50,000^{^}
France (SNEP)	2× Platinum	600,000^{*}
Germany (BVMI)	3× Gold	750,000^{^}
Netherlands (NVPI)	Gold	50,000^{^}
New Zealand (RMNZ)	Platinum	15,000^{^}
Switzerland (IFPI Switzerland)	Gold	25,000^{^}
United Kingdom (BPI)	2× Platinum	600,000^{^}
United States (RIAA)	Gold	500,000^{^}
^{*} Sales figures based on certification alone.^{^} Shipments figures based on certification alone.
