= Chiddingfold Forest =

Forest in England

Coordinates: 51.089°N 0.581°W

- Site of Special Scientific Interest
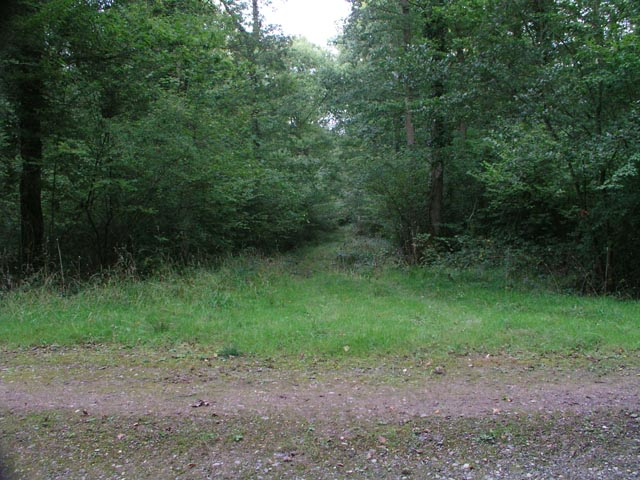
- Location of Chiddingfold Forest.
- Area of search: Surrey; West Sussex
- Grid reference: SU 995 332
- Interest: Biological
- Area: 542.5 hectares (1,341 acres)
- Notification date: 1991
- Location map: Magic Map

Chiddingfold Forest is a 542.5-hectare (1,341-acre) biological Site of Special Scientific Interest in Chiddingfold in Surrey and West Sussex. One part of it, Fir Tree Copse, is a nature reserve which is managed by the Surrey Wildlife Trust.

The site consists of a number of separate areas with a mosaic of habitats, including ancient woodland and conifer plantations. Over 500 species of butterflies and moths have been recorded including several which are rare and endangered, such as the Wood White butterfly and the rest harrow and orange upperwing moths. Other insects include the Cheilosia carbonaria hoverfly.
