= François Lanzi =

French painter (1916–1988)

François Lanzi (5 July 1916 – 13 November 1988) was a French-born artist who lived a large part of his adult life in the United Kingdom.

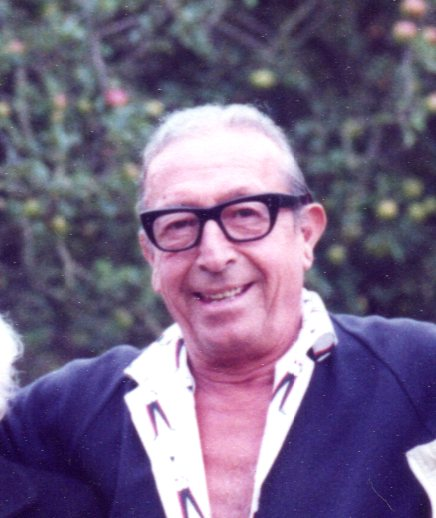
François Lanzi ca 1982

== His life ==
He was born in Ajaccio, Corsica, on 5 July 1916, to Laurent Lanzi and Clementine Sartoni. He had one older sister Clara Lanzi, the social activist and two brothers, one of whom was the composer Leon Preger. Moving from Corsica to Paris as a child, he later studied under Professeur Guillot de Raffaillac. He joined the French army at the beginning of World War II but was soon captured by the Germans and interred in various prisoner of war camps in Ukraine (Rawa-Ruska (Рава-Руська), Tarnopol (Тернопіль) and Tremblowla (Теребовля) ) and (Germany) (divers). Despite escaping on a number of occasions he nevertheless spent almost 5 years as a prisoner, which undoubtedly affected the way he was to develop his painting. He was requested by one of the guards, who knew him to be an artist, to draw some pornographic pictures. According to his war memoirs, the guard was suitably impressed by their realism and in return gave him cigarettes and bread. After the war, he taught and exhibited in Paris. In 1954, he moved to London, where he married Nora Egremont-Lee (née Henderson). In London, he exhibited at the Redfern Gallery (1958), the RBA Gallery (1959,1960), the AIA gallery (1960,1961) and the Savage Gallery (1960,1961). He also had a solo exhibition at the Stone Gallery (Newcastle) in 1961. In addition to painting, he also worked for several years for the framemakers and carvers, Robert Savage Ltd., where a number of well-known artists had also worked. After Savage closed his business in 1971 François Lanzi moved to Chiddingfold in Surrey until his death. Although he had lived in England many years (thirty-four in total at his death), his command of the English language was always very limited and he became somewhat withdrawn from the society around him. During his period in Chiddingfold, François Lanzi was re-discovered by the critic and gallery owner, Michael Budd. His paintings were exhibited in The Gallery (Knaphill) for a number of years. François Lanzi died in Guildford, Surrey on 13 November 1988. His marriage to Nora was childless, and she died on 3 June 2002.

== His work ==
His works from the London and Chiddingfold periods can be classified into several themes. Perhaps simply they could be termed under four headings. The vast majority of his work is abstract, pure imagination, original and spontaneous.

Upon superficial analysis the main themes, which repeat themselves throughout his work, could be described as,

– Christ-like forms,

– Stained glass creations,

– Formed and deformed Human/Horse-like heads,

– Landscape collages.

He uses so many different media but his goal seems to be the unending search to express his deepest, almost agonising feelings: not really concerned if he uses collage, watercolour, enamel, oil, canvas, board, card or other media. He could be closely compared to contemporary artists such as André Lanskoy and Kurt Schwitters among others of that period. He does not digress form his main themes of artistic work and his paintings are easily recognisable as Lanzi. His seclusion in Chiddingfold allowed him to follow his own artistic path, often working late into the night in his fairly dimly lit studio. Paintings and compositions by Lanzi are in private collections in England, France, South America, United States, Belgium, Spain, Canada and other countries. His work reflects the isolation, intensity and creativity of an abstract artist who Michael Budd described as "the self-absorbed".

== Critical reviews ==
During his last exhibition in The Gallery, Knaphill, George Melly wrote "... he left behind him some wonderful pictures ' ... These are not easy pictures but they are important ones. At a time when gimmicks and hype dominate so much of the art world it would be a grave injustice to ignore such intense and convincing manifestations of the human spirit "

After exhibiting at the Stone Gallery in Newcastle, W.E. Johnson of the Manchester Guardian wrote "In a pantheistic approach to nature, his stone and sea-shell compositions and a distinctive "Fantasie Sous Marine" have something of the metamorphic quality of the work of, Graham Sutherland..." He also compares his work to that of Alan Davie, both he and Lanzi passing a sizeable portion of their war years as prisoners of war.
