= Fir Tree Copse =

Nature reserve in Surrey, England

Coordinates: 51.105°N 0.540°W

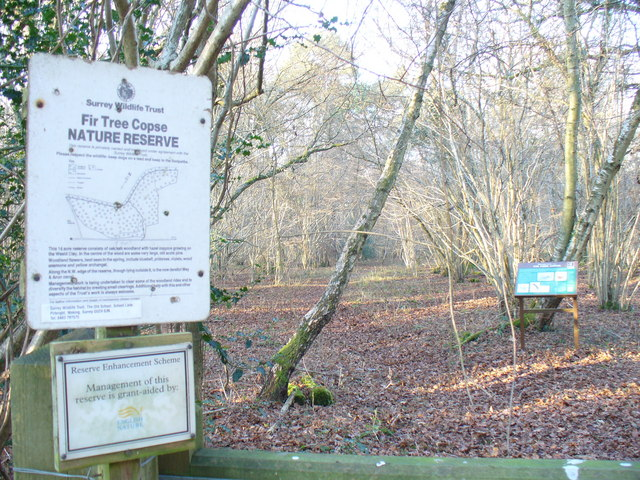
- Interactive map of Fir Tree Copse
- Type: Nature reserve
- Location: Dunsfold, Surrey
- OS grid: TQ023350
- Area: 6 hectares (15 acres)
- Manager: Surrey Wildlife Trust

Fir Tree Copse is a 6-hectare (15-acre) nature reserve south-east of Dunsfold in Surrey. It is managed by the Surrey Wildlife Trust and is part of the Chiddingfold Forest Site of Special Scientific Interest

This is oak and ash woodland, with hazel coppice. Pipistrelle bats have been recorded, together with birds such as the tawny owl and willow warbler. There are many species of fungi on rotting logs and invertebrates include the nationally scarce common fan-foot moth.

There is access from Dunsfold Road.
