= The Brazilian =

Instrumental by Genesis

from the album Invisible Touch
- Released: 6 June 1986
- Studio: The Farm (Chiddingfold, Surrey)
- Genre: Progressive rock; instrumental rock
- Length: 4:49
- Label: Atlantic
- Songwriters: Tony Banks; Phil Collins; Mike Rutherford
- Producers: Genesis; Hugh Padgham

Audio sample
- "The Brazilian": file; help

"The Brazilian" is an instrumental piece by the English rock band Genesis. It concludes their thirteenth studio album, Invisible Touch (1986), and features experimental sounds and effects.

Tony Banks, the band's keyboardist, built the song around a sample he had recorded on his E-mu Emulator. To sustain the sampled pattern of the Emulator, Banks placed a knife in the keys of the instrument. Discussing his use of the Emulator on "The Brazilian", Banks mentioned that it came from "switching the Emulator on and sampling whatever's going on in the studio", which he would then double and play back at different speeds. Genesis wrote two instrumental pieces for Invisible Touch: "The Brazilian" and "Do the Neurotic". The latter was cut from the album's final track selection.

Genesis performed the song live on a few occasions before permanently dropping it from their setlist in 1987. In 1987, the track received a Grammy Award nomination for Best Pop Instrumental Performance (Orchestra, Group or Soloist), but lost to "Top Gun Anthem".

"The Brazilian" was featured in the adult animated disaster film When the Wind Blows (1986), which was scored by Roger Waters of Pink Floyd. It was also used in an episode of Magnum, P.I. called "Unfinished Business". The track was also used extensively by the BBC in their TV coverage of the 1987 World Athletics Championships. The song was also featured in the American science fiction romantic comedy film, Palm Springs (2020), during Sarah Wilder's quantum physics montage. Reviewing the song for Rolling Stone, Ryan Reed characterised it as "a strange way to end Genesis' most radio-friendly LP".

== Personnel ==
Genesis

- Tony Banks – keyboards; synth bass
- Phil Collins – Simmons drums
- Mike Rutherford – electric guitars
