= Mama (Genesis song) =

Single by Genesis

from the album Genesis
- B-side: "It's Gonna Get Better"
- Released: 22 August 1983
- Recorded: 1983
- Studio: The Farm, Surrey
- Genre: Synth-rock; new pop
- Length: 6:49 (album version); 6:07 (single version); 5:18 (video edit / radio edit); 7:27 (long version)
- Label: Atlantic, Virgin, Vertigo
- Songwriters: Tony Banks, Phil Collins, Mike Rutherford
- Producers: Genesis, Hugh Padgham

Genesis singles chronology
"Paperlate" (1982)	"Mama" (1983)	"That's All" (1983)

Music video
- "Mama" on YouTube

"Mama" is a song by the English rock band Genesis, released as the first single in 1983 from their self-titled album. It is recognisable for its harsh drum machine introduction composed by Mike Rutherford, which leads into minimalist synthesizer lines in a minor tonality and finally Phil Collins' reverb-laden voice. It remains the band's most successful single in the UK, peaking at No. 4 on the UK singles chart. It also made the top 10 in Switzerland, Austria, Norway, Ireland and the Netherlands. It was less popular in the US, only reaching No. 73 on the Billboard Hot 100. A 1992 re-release of the single managed to reach the Top 40 in Germany.

== Theme ==
The song's theme involves a young man's longing for a particular prostitute. On the DVD The Genesis Songbook, the band and producer Hugh Padgham revealed that the inspiration for Collins' menacing laugh came from rap music pioneer Grandmaster Flash's song "The Message".

From the 1983 Genesis Three into One Wavelength 3-LP vinyl radio show interview:

Our manager, when he first heard it, thought it was about abortion, the kind of feeling of the, you know, the foetus, if you like, saying to the Mother 'Please give me a chance, can't you feel my heart, don't take away my last chance', all those lyrics are in the song but in fact what it is, is just about a young teenager that's got a mother fixation with a prostitute that he's just happened to have met in passing and he has such a strong feeling for her and doesn't understand why she isn't interested in him. It's a bit like [British actor] David Niven in The Moon's a Balloon, I don't know if you've read that book, he's very young, just come out of cadet college or whatever, and he meets this quite, you know, 45-year-old prostitute who he has a fantastic time with. He's special to her but it definitely can't go any further than what it is and that's really what the song is about, with sinister overtones.

— Phil Collins

== Recording ==
The Linn LM-1 rhythm was programmed by Mike Rutherford, rather than drummer Collins. It was fed through an AMS RMX-16 reverb on the gated reverb setting and then into a Fender amplifier (though Mike Rutherford remembers it was a Mesa/Boogie model) with a large amount of distortion. The signal from the amp was mixed with a direct signal from the Linn to give the drum sound some character. Tony Banks used a Synclavier, ARP Quadra, E-mu Emulator, and Sequential Circuits Prophet-10 in the recording. The Quadra's rhythmic pulses were triggered by the 16th note hi-hat pattern coming from the Linn drum machine. A low E drone was recorded on the Prophet-10 through most of the song. A koto, which happened to be in the studio one day, was sampled into the Emulator and used in the song because it was felt that no other sound worked in the section.

== Music video ==
The music video for the song plays out the lyrics, showing Collins singing to a mysterious woman while Banks and Rutherford play in the background. The video is shot in a sepia tone until halfway through when colour fades in.

== Versions and live performances ==
There are at least four versions of the studio recording of "Mama": the original, full-length cut (7:27, released as a 12" single and later as a CD single, backed by the full-length 6:27 version of "It's Gonna Get Better", also in a shortened version on the Genesis album); a somewhat early-faded version (6:46, released on the Genesis album itself); an edited version (6:07, released as a 7" single and on the compilation album Turn It On Again – Best of '81–'83); and a heavily edited version (5:18, released on the promotional video, promo DJ 7" and 12" singles, and the 1999 compilation album Turn It On Again: The Hits). An extremely rare 3:30 and heavily edited version was released on a 1983 Italian promo 7-inch. A 10:43 "work in progress" take from the 1983 sessions is included at the end of the third disc of Genesis Archive 2: 1976–1992. This demonstrated how Genesis would try out new songs; the band would play while Phil Collins would just sing anything that came to mind, normally without actual words.

The song was played live during the Mama Tour, Invisible Touch, We Can't Dance (only for the first shows), Calling All Stations (with Ray Wilson on vocals), Turn It On Again and The Last Domino? tours.

A live version appears on their albums The Way We Walk, Volume One: The Shorts and Live Over Europe 2007, and their DVDs Genesis Live at Wembley Stadium and When in Rome 2007. The song also appears on the 1985 home video release The Mama Tour.

== Personnel ==
- Phil Collins – vocals, drums
- Tony Banks – keyboards
- Mike Rutherford – Gibson SG electric guitar, bass guitar, Linn LM-1 drum machine

== Charts ==
=== Weekly charts ===
Chart (1983)	Peak position
Australia (Kent Music Report)	45
Austria (Ö3 Austria Top 40)	10
Belgium (Ultratop 50 Flanders)	21
Finland (Suomen virallinen lista)	5
Ireland (IRMA)	5
Netherlands (Dutch Top 40)	7
Netherlands (Single Top 100)	7
New Zealand (Recorded Music NZ)	27
Norway (VG-lista)	3
Switzerland (Schweizer Hitparade)	2
UK Singles (Official Charts)	4
US Billboard Hot 100	73
US Mainstream Rock Airplay (Billboard)	5
West Germany (GfK)	4

Chart (1992)	Peak position
Germany (Official German Charts)	21

=== Year-end charts ===
Chart (1983)	Position
Netherlands (Dutch Top 40)	87
Netherlands (Single Top 100)	63
Switzerland (Schweizer Hitparade)	15
West Germany (Official German Charts)	74

== Certifications ==
Certifications for "Mama"
Region	Certification	Certified units/sales
Germany (BVMI)	Gold	500,000^{^}
New Zealand (RMNZ)	Gold	15,000^{‡}
United Kingdom (BPI)	Silver	250,000^{^}
^{^} Shipments figures based on certification alone.^{‡} Sales+streaming figures based on certification alone.

== Cover versions ==
"Mama" was covered by the band Magellan on the 1996 Genesis tribute album Supper's Ready. The song was also covered by the French extreme metal band Carnival in Coal and released on their album French Cancan (1999). Brazilian power metal band Angra covered the song on their EP Hunters and Prey (2002). "Mama" was covered by the Finnish heavy metal band Tarot as the second track on the single for "Undead Son", the only single release from their 2003 album Suffer Our Pleasures.
