= Throwing It All Away =

- European picture sleeve

Single by Genesis

from the album Invisible Touch
- B-side: "I'd Rather Be You" (UK); "Do the Neurotic" (edited) (US)
- Released: 6 August 1986
- Studio: The Farm (Surrey, England)
- Genre: Soft rock
- Length: 3:51
- Label: Virgin
- Songwriters: Tony Banks; Phil Collins; Mike Rutherford
- Lyricist: Mike Rutherford
- Producers: Genesis; Hugh Padgham

Genesis UK singles chronology
| "Tonight, Tonight, Tonight" (1987) | "Throwing It All Away" (1987) | "No Son of Mine" (1991) |

Alternate cover
- North American picture sleeve

"Throwing It All Away" is the seventh track on the 1986 studio album Invisible Touch by Genesis. It was the second single taken from the album in the United States, reaching No. 4 on the Billboard Hot 100 in October 1986, as well as No. 1 on Billboard's Adult Contemporary chart and the Album Rock Tracks chart. It was the last single released from the album in the UK in June 1987, reaching No. 22. The song was also a top 40 hit on the Irish Singles Chart, peaking at No. 24.

The song is a soft rock ballad structured around a guitar riff by Mike Rutherford, who also wrote the lyrics. The U.S. single included an edited version of the instrumental "Do the Neurotic" as the B-side; the UK edition featured the track "I'd Rather Be You".

== Live performances ==
"Throwing It All Away" was performed live during the Invisible Touch, The Way We Walk, Calling All Stations and Turn It On Again tours; aside from the 1986 leg of the Invisible Touch tour, the song was transposed to a lower key to accommodate Collins' deepening voice with each succeeding tour (or Ray Wilson's deeper voice in the case of the Calling All Stations tour).

The song was also performed live on the 2018 North American and Latin American legs of Collins' solo Not Dead Yet Tour.

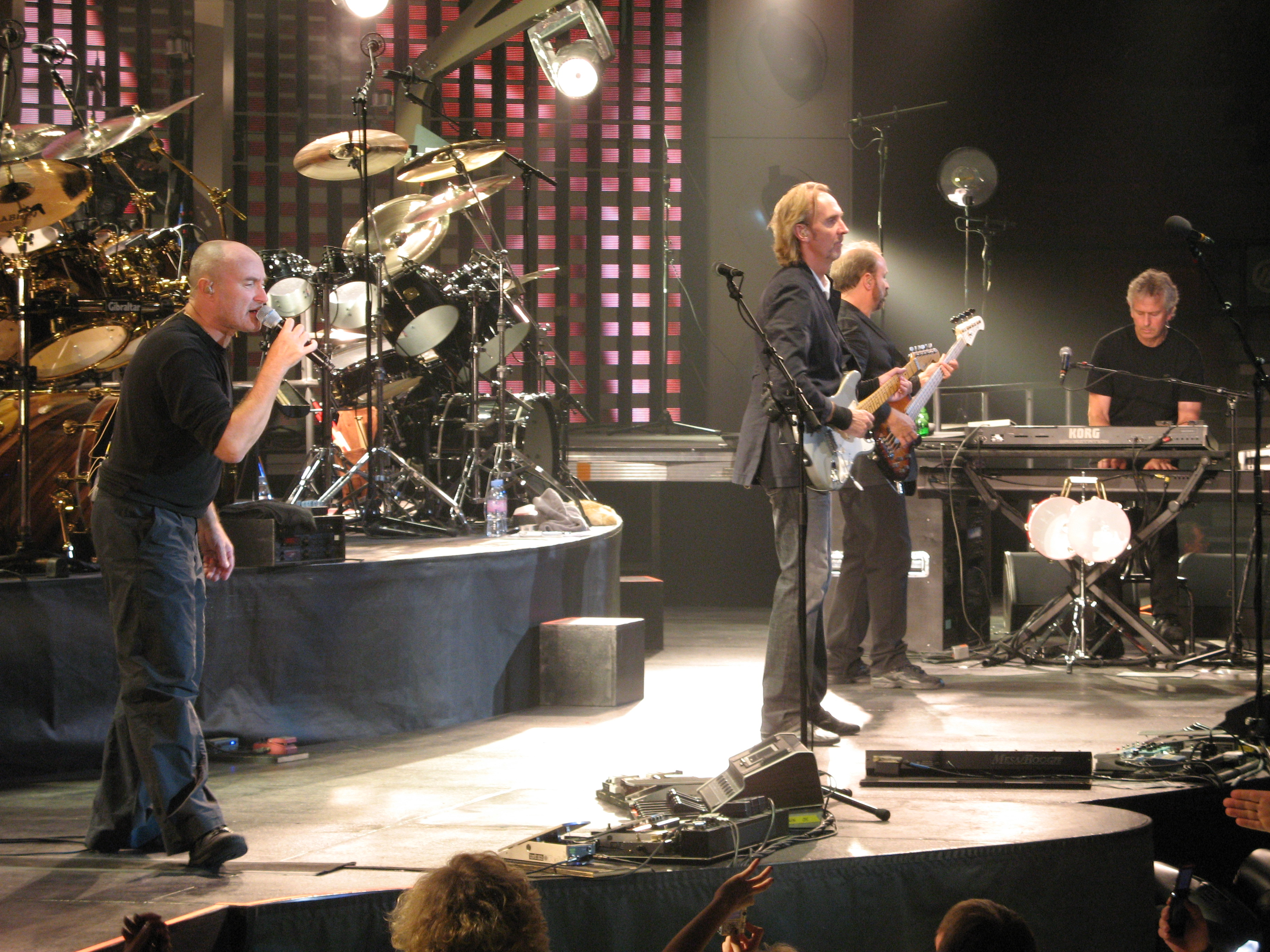
Genesis performing "Throwing it All Away" in Pittsburgh, Mellon Arena, 9 September 2007

A live version appears on the CDs of The Way We Walk, Volume One: The Shorts and Live Over Europe 2007 and the When in Rome 2007 DVD.

== Music video ==
A music video for the song was composed of soundcheck footage and shots of the band travelling while on their Invisible Touch Tour of North America, much of which was filmed by Collins on his 1985 Sony Handycam, mostly filmed in Toronto (Exhibition Stadium) and Detroit (Joe Louis Arena). It is featured on their DVD The Video Show.

== Reception ==
Billboard called it a "dance ballad" that sounds a lot like "a cheerier version" of Collins' earlier single "Take Me Home." In Billboard magazine's Critics' Choice at the end of 1986, Kim Freeman chose the song as No. 7 in his top ten countdown, describing it as "a rare ballad that isn't too sappy to enjoy". Cash Box called it "romantic and wistful."

Stevie Chick, writing for The Guardian in 2014, called the song a "genuinely affecting ballad" but observed its similarity to Collins' solo work, stating it "could have easily fitted on his solo albums".

In his assessment of the song for AllMusic, François Couture wrote, "This love song featured heartfelt vocals, a simple piano accompaniment, and Mike Rutherford's trademark rhythm guitar, plus a very catchy chorus. Nothing striking, but all the elements came together nicely and adult contemporary radio stations played it extensively."

== Track listings ==
7-inch: Virgin / GENS 5 (UK)

1. "Throwing It All Away" – 3:41
2. "I'd Rather Be You" – 3:57

7-inch: Atlantic / 7-89372 (US)

1. "Throwing It All Away" – 3:41
2. "Do The Neurotic" (Edit) – 5:21

12-inch: Virgin / GENS 5–12 (UK)

1. "Throwing It All Away" (live)
2. "I'd Rather Be You"
3. "Invisible Touch" (live)
- Also released on cassette (GENSC5)
- Live tracks were recorded at The Forum, Los Angeles, 1986

== Release history ==
| Country | Date |
|---|---|
| United States | 8 August 1986 |
| United Kingdom | 8 June 1987 |

== Charts ==
| Year-end chart (1986) | Rank |
|---|---|
| US Top Pop Singles (Billboard) | 84 |
