= Chiddingfold =

Village and civil parish in Surrey, England

Coordinates: 51.1113°N 0.6282°W

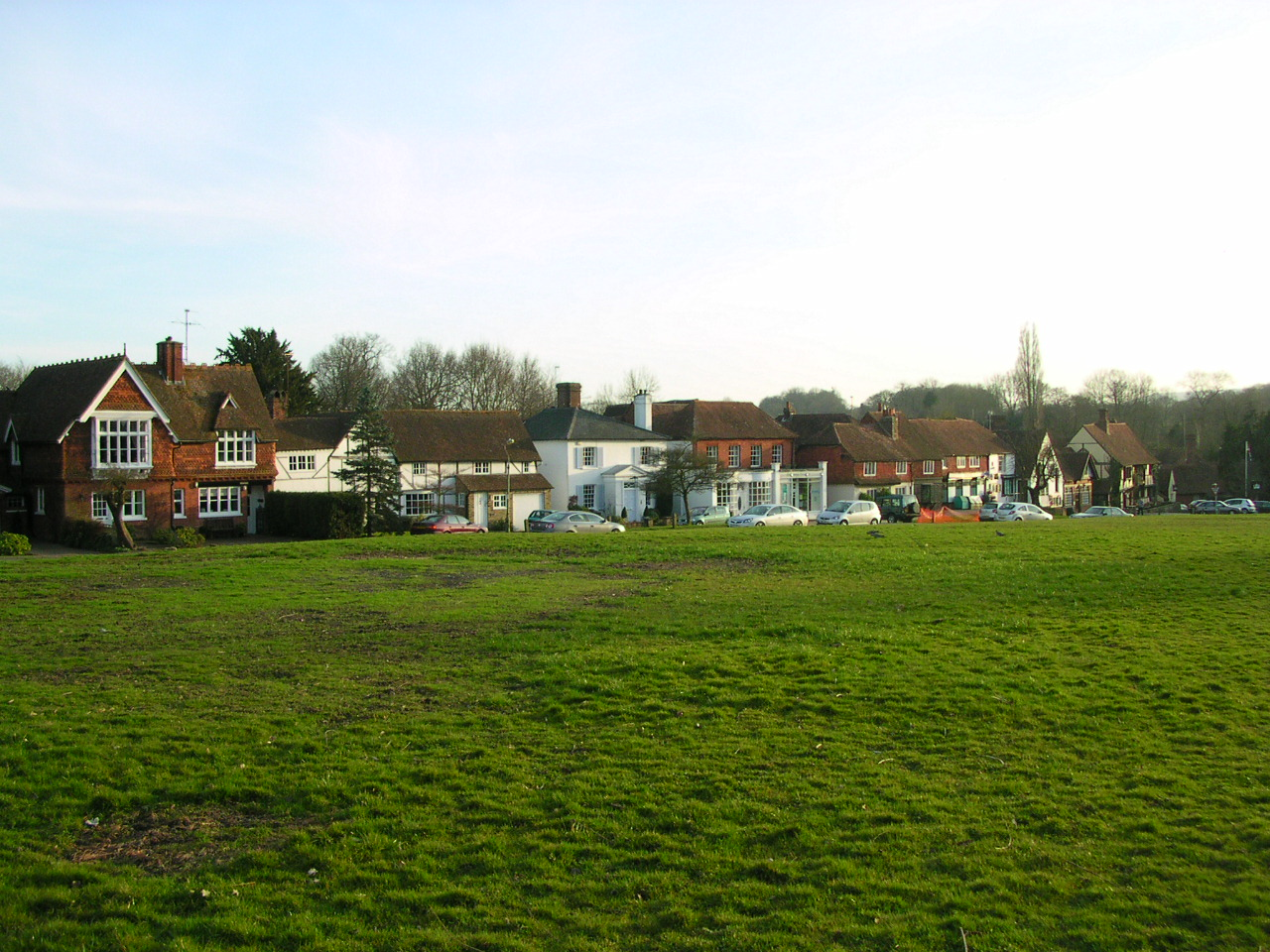
- Village green

- Location within Surrey
- Area: 28.18 km^{2} (10.88 sq mi)
- Population: 2,960 (Civil Parish 2011)
  - Density: 105/km^{2} (270/sq mi)
- OS grid reference: SU961355
- Civil parish: Chiddingfold
- District: Waverley
- Shire county: Surrey
- Region: South East
- Country: England
- Sovereign state: United Kingdom
- Post town: Godalming
- Postcode district: GU8
- Dialling code: 01428
- Police: Surrey
- Fire: Surrey
- Ambulance: South East Coast
- UK Parliament: Godalming and Ash

Chiddingfold is a village and civil parish in the Weald in the Waverley district of Surrey, England. It lies on the A283 road between Milford and Petworth. The parish includes the hamlets of Ansteadbrook, High Street Green and Combe Common.

Chiddingfold Forest, a Site of Special Scientific Interest, lies mostly within its boundaries.

== History ==
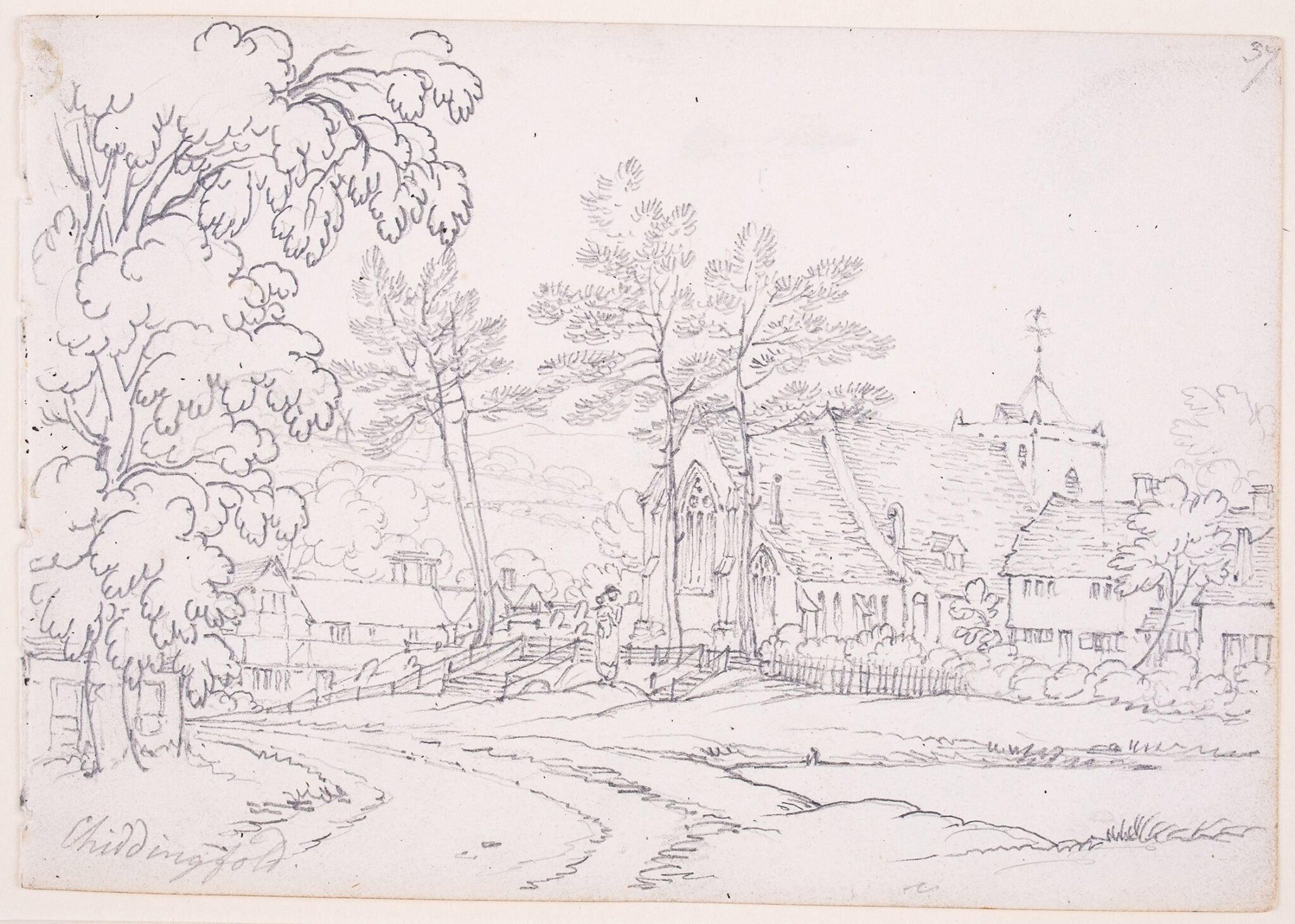
Sketch of Chiddingfold by James Bourne, circa 1820

The name of Chiddingfold 'Chadynge's fold', Chiddingefoulde, is derived from the Saxon, probably meaning the fold (enclosure for animals) "in the hollow".

Between the 14th and 17th centuries, Chiddingfold was a centre for glass-making. Window glass was made in the village in the 1350s for St Stephen's Chapel, Westminster and St. George's Chapel, Windsor.

The village appears on Ignazio Danti's 1565 map of the British Isles, which is on display at the Palazzo Vecchio in Florence, Italy.

The Guy Fawkes festivities saw in 1887 the village policeman's house attacked by a mob – he was later transferred elsewhere – he may have set the fire early or failed to prevent it from being lit before time. The event of 1929 faced wider unrest, culminating a week later with talk of ducking innocent Sgt Brake into the pond being stalled by 200 Surrey officers using specially requisitioned buses; the village pubs were ordered to close and a JP was on hand to read the Riot Act should it have proved necessary.

There was, from a date in the 19th century until the early 20th century, a tile and brickworks, extracting and processing the clay underlying the parish.

Chiddingfold has an archive which shows the history of Chiddingfold and the previous owners of Chiddingfold houses.

== Amenities ==
=== The Crown Inn ===
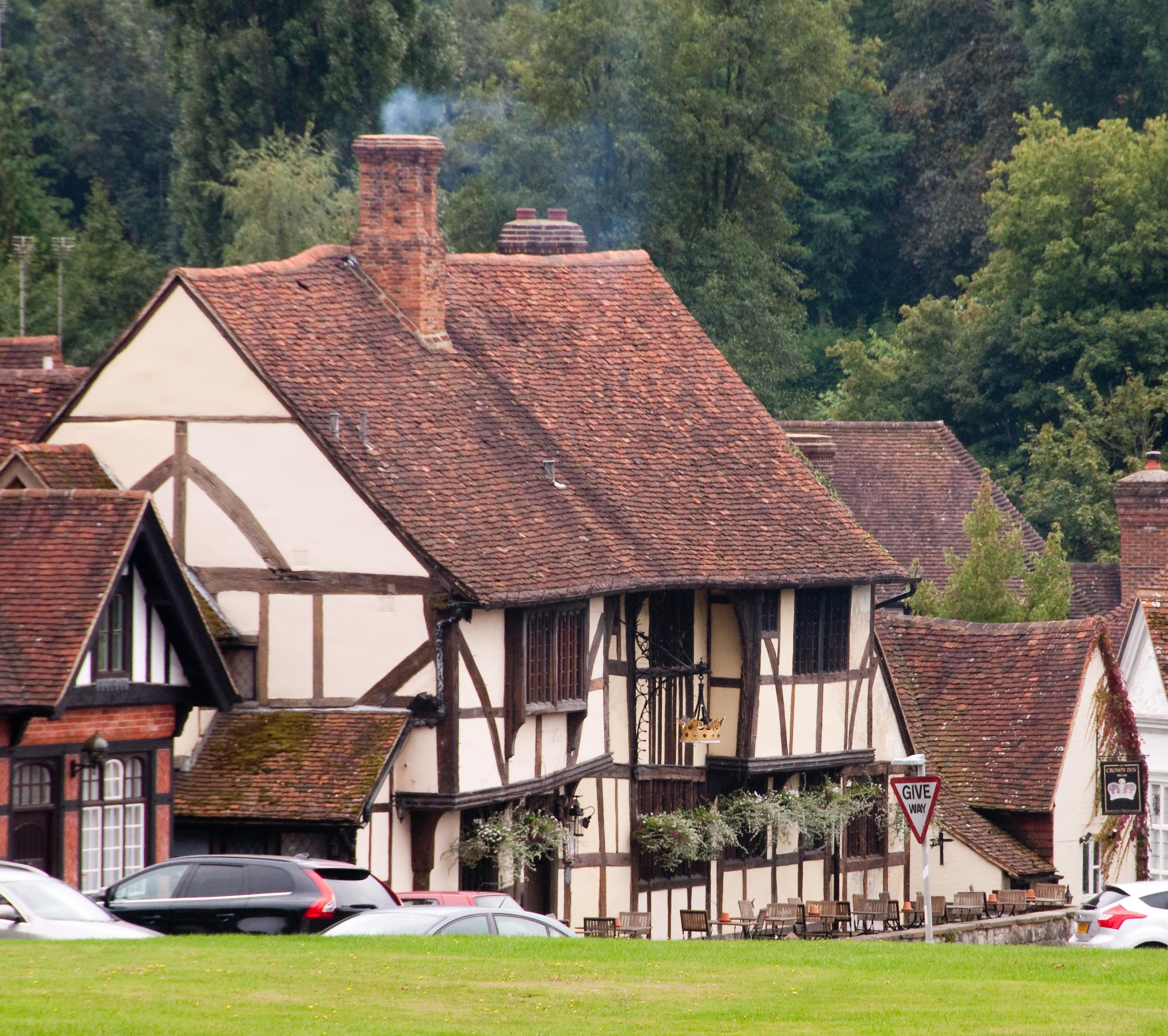
The Crown Inn.

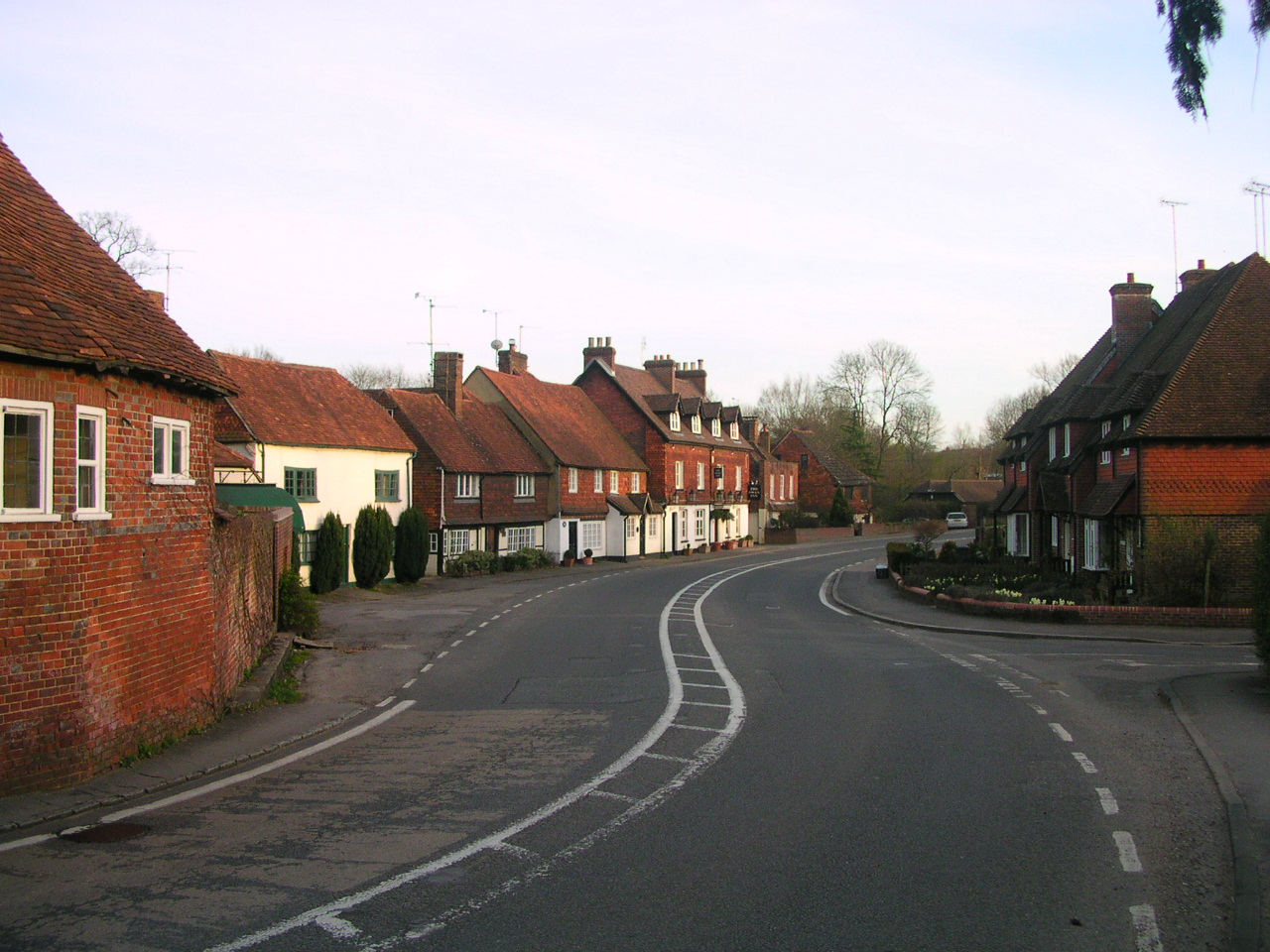
The main street.

The Crown Inn is one of the oldest inns in England. Built as a rest house for Cistercian monks on their pilgrimage from Winchester to the shrine of Thomas Becket in Canterbury, it claims to have been established in 1285 with the earliest recorded reference to the present building dated 1383; probably when the alehouse (the Halle) expanded to include accommodation, thus becoming an inn. Subsequently, it merged with the adjoining alehouse through common ownership. The Crown has seen many distinguished visitors down the years. In 1552, Edward VI, the "boy king", attended by high officials of state, courtiers, peers and some 4000 men encamped on the village green. It is reputed that in 1591 his elder sister, Queen Elizabeth I, "sojourned there for refreshment" en route from Loseley Park to Cowdray Park: her expense roll for the journey showing two shillings being paid for a tonne of wine to be transported to the village from Ripley.

Night Intruder by Squadron Leader Jeremy Howard-Williams contains the following reference to VE Day celebrations on 8 May 1945:

"We had one long party stretching over four or five days, starting at the Crown at Chiddingfold, where they duly honoured the open booking we had made in December".

=== Other ===
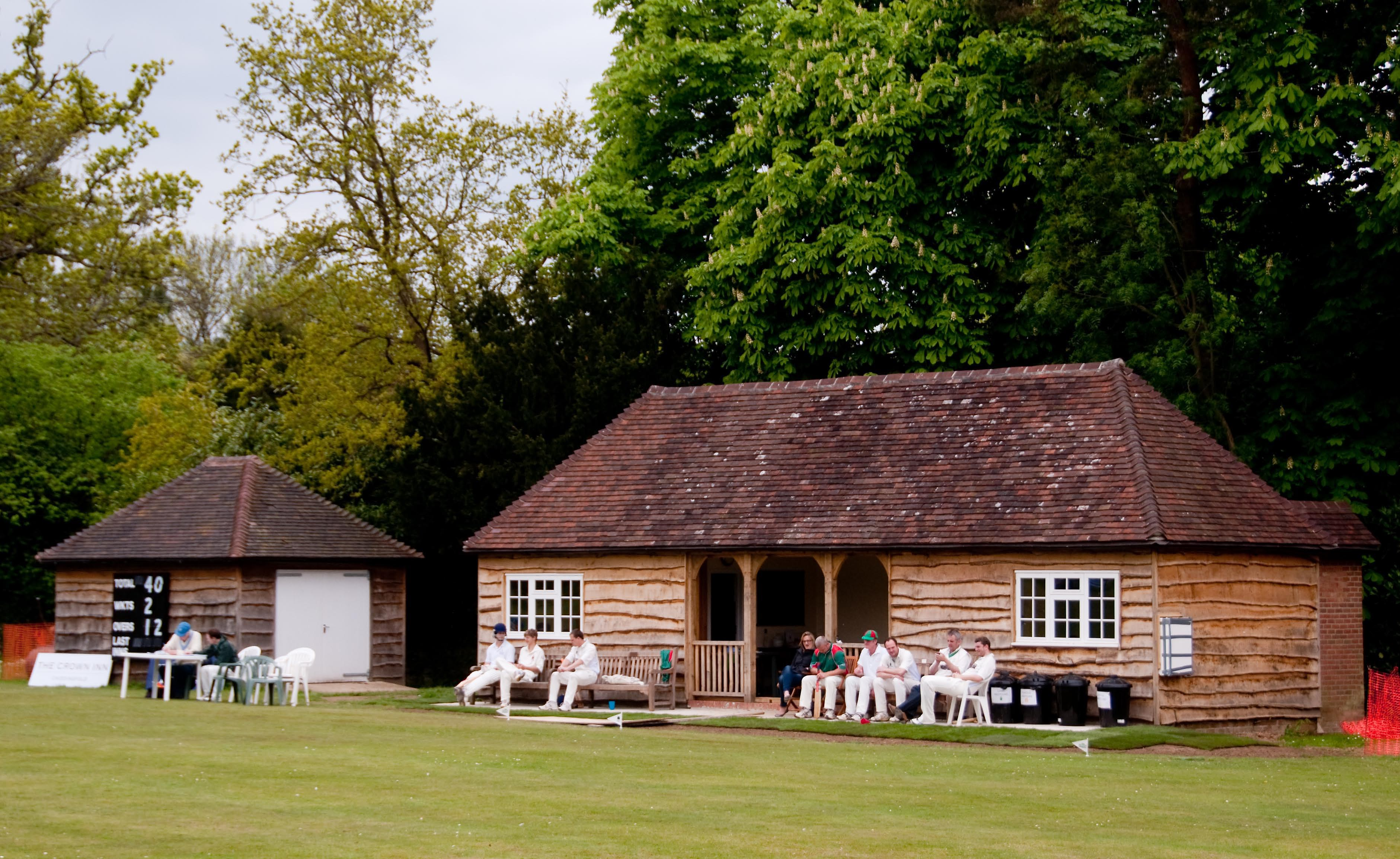
The refurbished Cricket Pavilion in 2013, with the new ground store left

A church (St Mary's), pond, shops and houses lie on three sides of the village green, with the forge on it. Almost half of the land is forested, matching its location within Anglo Saxon England, within The Weald.

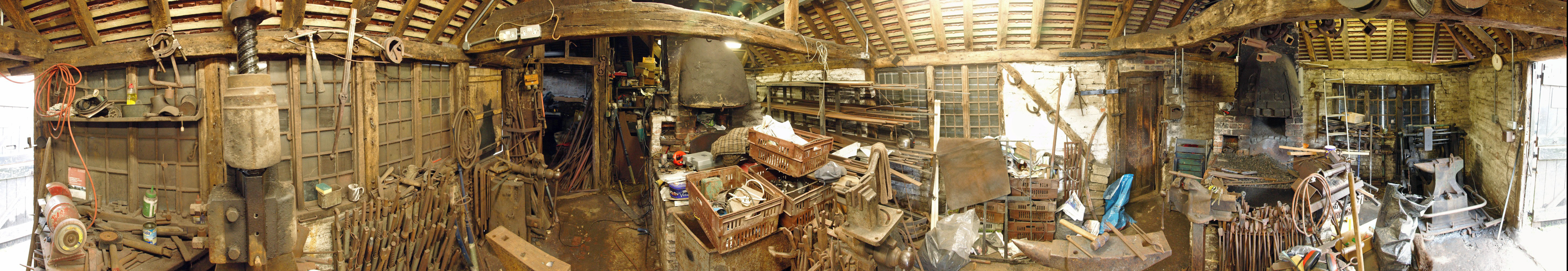
The two hearths in Chiddingfold forge seen in 2014. The main entrance from NW seen at each end of the image

The Chiddingfold Scout Group is active with boys and girls as Beavers, Cubs and Scouts.

Chiddingfold Cricket Club has active first and second teams, that compete in the L'Anson League, as well as women's and junior sections. The junior club competes in the Berkley Sport Two Counties League at every age group.

Chiddingfold has a doctors' surgery.

=== Events ===
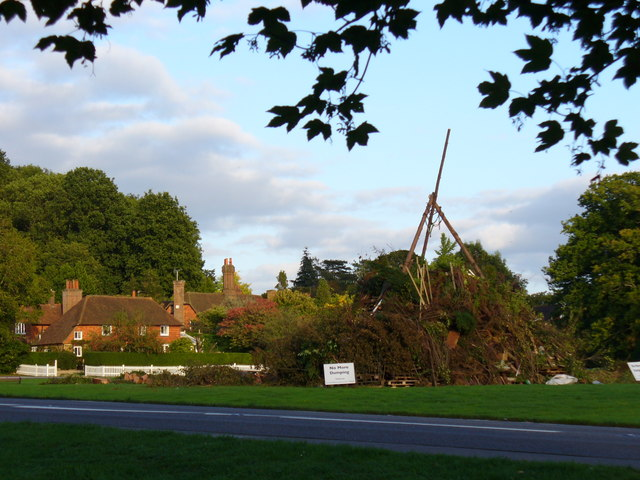
Bonfire on the Green

The village is known for its torchlit procession, bonfire and fireworks display on the Saturday evening closest to 5 November (Guy Fawkes Day). A village festival is also held every year on the village green on the 2nd Sunday in June.

== Hamlets ==
=== Ansteadbrook ===
This small southern settlement has a brook of the same name that rises just 2 miles (3.2 km) west at the larger hamlet of Almshouse Common in Haslemere civil parish and passes Lythe Hill Farm and Hotel, (architecturally in the second highest category), Grade II* listed above where further springs add to the flow on both sides of the brook.

In the hamlet itself Petworth Road, a road east from Haslemere, forms a junction with Killinghurst Lane that leads towards Chiddingfold. Here there are a line of four listed cottages. Further along Petworth Road, near the border with West Sussex, are Benham's Stud Farm and its Barn, Huntingfords and Cherry Tree Cottage.

=== Highstreet Green ===
This hamlet lies on a small connecting road in a very wooded area starting 1 mile (1.6 km) southeast of Chiddingfold, at its centre is Dunsfold Ryse Farm and typical of the area, a Grade II listed, timber framed, 16th century house, Quince Cottage.

=== Combe Common ===
At the western fringe of the village centre is this common which plays host to events in the summer, and which residents of nearby roads sometimes include as their locality.

== Religion ==
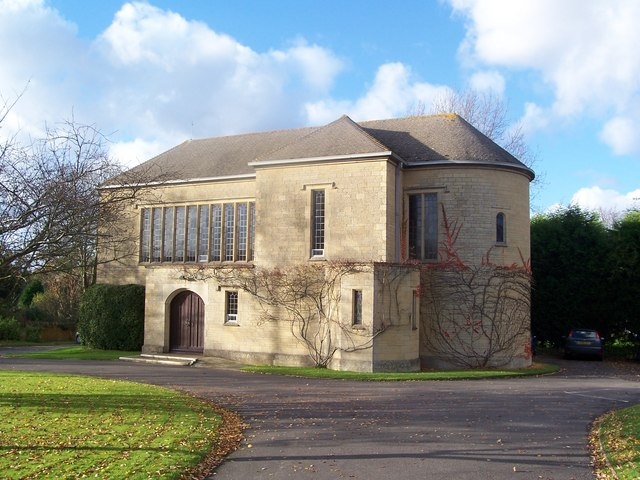
Saint Teresa of Avila Catholic Church

It is claimed a place of worship has stood on the grounds of St Mary's Church of England since c978AD.

Chiddingfold Baptist Church is located in Woodside Road.

The Saint Teresa of Avila Catholic Church dates from 1959.

== Media links ==
The village was the setting for the 1946 film The Years Between starring Michael Redgrave and Valerie Hobson. The rock band The Stranglers, then called The Guildford Stranglers, were based in Chiddingfold during their key formative period in the mid-seventies, sometimes using the name The Chiddingfold Chokers and frequenting The Crown Inn. The rock band Genesis built their studio The Farm in the parish in the early 1980s; they also rehearsed at the Chiddingfold Ex-Servicemen's Club and side-project Mike + The Mechanics shot the video for their 1995 hit, "Over My Shoulder", on the village cricket green.

== Demography and housing ==
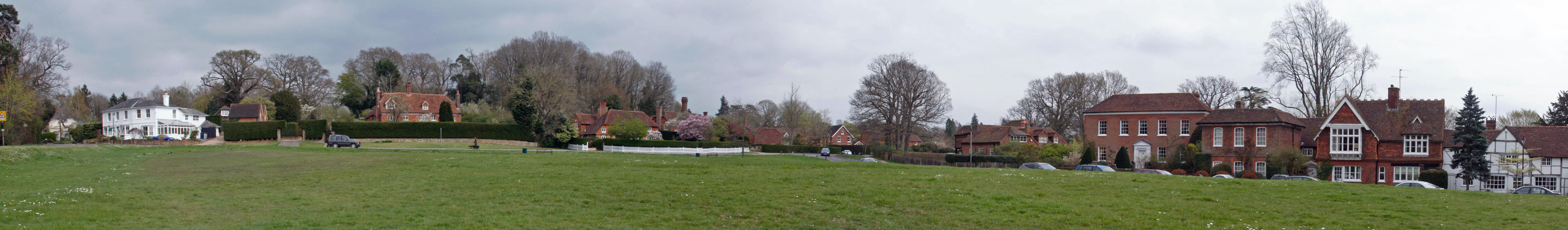
Panoramic of the eastern sector of Chiddingfold village green. The site of the bonfire in the left foreground.

2011 Census Homes
Output area	Detached	Semi-detached	Terraced	Flats and apartments	Caravans/temporary/mobile homes	shared between households
(Civil Parish)	511	429	92	87	0	0

The average level of accommodation in the region composed of detached houses was 28%, the average that was apartments was 22.6%.

2011 Census Key Statistics
Output area	Population	Households	% Owned outright	% Owned with a loan	hectares
(Civil Parish)	2,960	1,119	37.2%	39.4%	2,818

The proportion of households in the civil parish who owned their home outright compares to the regional average of 35.1%. The proportion who owned their home with a loan compares to the regional average of 32.5%. The remaining % is made up of rented dwellings (plus a negligible % of households living rent-free).

== Notable residents ==
The economist and ecological writer David Fleming was born in Chiddingfold in 1940, to Gold Dagger award-winning crime writer Joan Margaret Fleming.

Socialite Viva Seton Montgomerie spent her final years in the village, until her death in 1959.

The French-born abstract artist François Lanzi lived in Chiddingfold from 1971 until his death in 1988.

The rock band Genesis purchased a farm in Chiddingfold in 1980 and re-modeled one of the buildings into a recording studio. Known as The Farm the band began recording there in 1981 and the individual members of the band have also recorded solo albums there.
