= The Farm (recording studio) =

Recording studio in Chiddingfold, Surrey, England

Coordinates: 51.088934°N 0.610839°W

Fisher Lane Farm
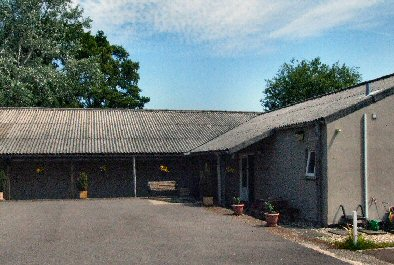
- The Farm in 2006
- Company type: Recording studio
- Industry: Music
- Founded: November 1980
- Area served: Fisher Lane, Chiddingfold, Surrey

The Farm (also known as Fisher Lane Farm) was a recording studio in Chiddingfold, Surrey owned by the rock band Genesis. The group bought the property in 1980 and, after remodelling it into a studio, recorded every studio album there between Abacab (1981) and Calling All Stations (1997), in addition to production and mixing work, and solo projects from the individual members.

== History ==
The 80-acre estate is situated on Fisher Lane and was a former dairy farm that initially consisted of a Grade II listed 16th century farmhouse and a single cowshed. Genesis had wanted their own facility to write, record, and master for several years, avoiding the costs and time constraints involved from working in commercial studios, and also to have a place close to their own homes. After buying the property in November 1980, the cowshed was remodelled into a recording studio in four months. Longtime Genesis technician Geoff Callingham recalled the intense building work and said it would have been easier to demolish the old shed and build a new studio from scratch, but British planning regulations created setbacks and the band were keen to start recording, so a new building was constructed inside the shed. Abacab (1981) was the band's first album recorded at The Farm, but the writing of which was done inside the farmhouse while construction was ongoing.

The studio's initial setup was designed by architect John Flynn, the control room of which was described as "rather small and dark". In August 1981, Recording Engineer/Producer magazine reported that the then-recently completed studio consisted of an Amek 36x24 M2000A console, Studer A80 24-track and 2-track tape machines, an EMT Echo Plate, and a set of UREI monitors powered by Crown amplifiers. Mics were by Shure, Beyerdynamic Neumann and PZM. In addition to Genesis, the studio was also used by Eric Clapton, David Crosby, and George Harrison. A setup of keyboards, microphones, and a mixing desk named Scrapyard Studio was installed in the main farmhouse for writing and recording ideas. By 1992, the studio had four caretakers.

In 1984, a new control room was added to the building, leaving the original control room to be an editing room. By this time, the studio had various acoustic modifications by Andy Munro. In the following year, the studio was upgraded to a plan supervised by Masami "Sam" Toyishima before the band started work on Invisible Touch, creating a larger and brighter space. They installed an SSL 4000E console with 56 channels of Total Recall automation. Other installed items included the SSL Integral Synchronizer to synchronise a pair of Studer A800 multitrack machines, and a Sony U-matic machine to use for post-production work on the band's videos. The new studio featured a live room made from stone that was built from the band's experiences from recording at The Townhouse in London.

In later years The Farm was mainly used for mixing and production and hired out to other musicians, including N-Dubz. In March 2016, the studio filed for insolvency. In 2022, Banks said that the studio no longer exists and much of the equipment was sold. He bought Rutherford's share of the estate in order for his son to start converting the former barn into a residence.
