= God, king and country =

God, king and country (Latin: Deo, rege et patria) and similar may refer to:

- "For God, King and Country", the motto of the 18th Light Horse Regiment
- "Irishmen united for God, king and country", the motto of Confederate Ireland
- "Pro Deo Rege Patria", the motto of Woodbridge School
- "Allāh, al-Waṭan, al-Malik" ("God, Country, King"), the motto of the Kingdom of Morocco

== See also ==
- For God and country
- For king and country
- God, Syria and Bashar
- Gods and Kings
