= Clive Collins =

English cartoonist and illustrator (1942–2022)

Clive Collins MBE
- Born: Clive Hugh Austin Collins; 6 February 1942; Weston-super-Mare, England
- Died: 21 April 2022 (aged 80); Leigh-on-Sea, England
- Occupations: Cartoonist; illustrator
- Years active: 1964–2022
- Known for: Satirical cartoons; regular contributor to Punch magazine
- Relatives: Phil Collins (brother); Lily Collins (niece)
- Website: Official website (archive)

Clive Hugh Austin Collins (6 February 1942 – 21 April 2022) was an English cartoonist and illustrator.

== Career ==
Collins contributed drawings to many publications including The Oldie, Playboy, Punch, Reader's Digest, The Sun (where he also doubled as the racing tipster 'Lucky Jim'), and The Daily Mail. He was the secretary of the British Cartoonists' Association and the Life Vice-President of The Cartoonists' Club of Great Britain. In 2012, he was made a Member of the Order of the British Empire. He was awarded the Cartoonist of the Year award by the Cartoonist Club of Great Britain in 1984, 1985 and 1987. In 1985, Collins was named the Cartoonist of the Year at The International Pavilion of Humor of Montreal, Canada, whose director was Robert LaPalme.

== Personal life ==
Collins was the older brother of musician Phil Collins, and the uncle of actresses Lily Collins and Joely Collins and musicians Simon Collins and Nic Collins.

== Death ==
Collins died on 21 April 2022, at the age of 80.
