= Better Strangers =

Better Strangers may refer to:

- Better Strangers, a rock band co-founded by Nic Collins
- "Better Strangers", a track on Royal Blood's 2014 album Royal Blood
