= Queen and Country =

Queen and Country may refer to:

- Queen & Country, a comic book written by Greg Rucka and published by Oni Press
- Queen and Country (artwork), an artwork by Steve McQueen on the Iraq War
- Queen and Country (film), a 2014 British film
- "Queen and Country", song of the 1974 album, War Child, by Jethro Tull
- For Queen and Country, a 1988 British film starring Denzel Washington

== See also ==
- For king and country (disambiguation)
