= For king and country =

For king and country and similar may refer to:

- For King & Country (band), an Australian Christian pop duo, based in the United States
- For King and Country (Advanced Squad Leader), a board wargame module
- "For King and Country" (Sanctuary), a 2010 television episode

== See also ==
- For King and Another Country, a 2015 book by Indian historian Shrabani Basu
- For God and Country (disambiguation)
- King and Country, a 1964 British war film
- The King and Country debate, in 1933 at the Oxford Union debating society
- King & Country (company), manufacturer of military miniatures
- Queen and Country (disambiguation)
- God, king and country
- Red Triangle Day, see: Red triangle (badge) § Other uses
