= Not Dead Yet Tour =

2017–2019 concert tour by Phil Collins

- Tour by Phil Collins
- Promotional poster for the tour
- Location: Europe; North America; Oceania; South America
- Start date: 2 June 2017
- End date: 19 October 2019
- Legs: 6
- No. of shows: 97
- Attendance: 1.54 million (88 shows)
- Box office: $202.6 million (88 shows)

Phil Collins concert chronology
- The First Final Farewell Tour (2004–2005); Not Dead Yet Tour (2017–2019)

The Not Dead Yet Tour (also known as Not Dead Yet Live! and Still Not Dead Yet Live!) was a concert tour by English recording artist Phil Collins, named after his autobiography released on 25 October 2016.

The tour grossed $202.6 million from 88 shows and was attended by more than 1.54 million people.

== Background ==
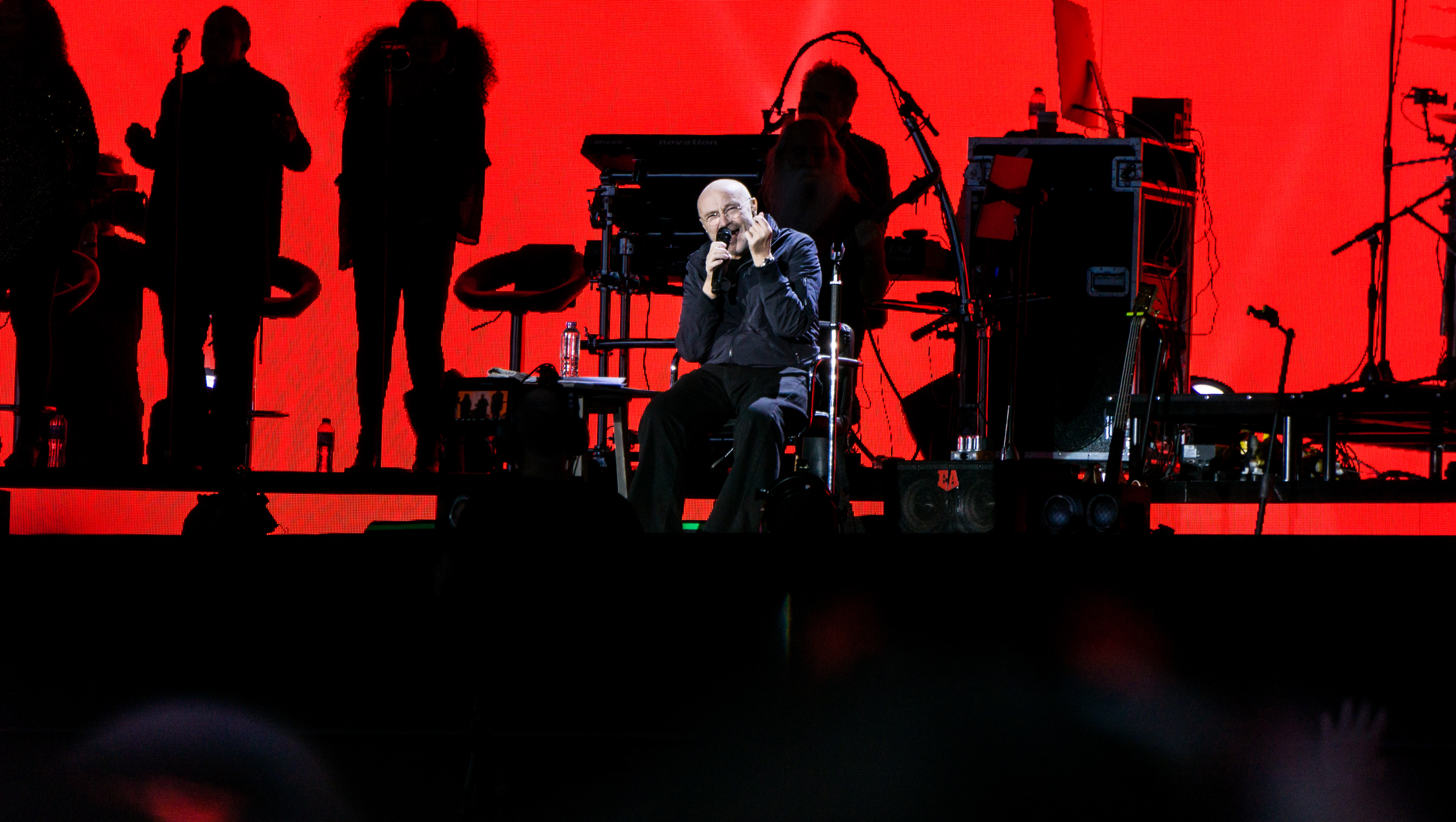
Collins performing to 65,000 at Hyde Park, London on 30 June 2017 as part of the Not Dead Yet Tour.

Collins announced the tour on 17 October 2016 at a press conference held at the Royal Albert Hall in London. The tour included five concerts at the venue, and five each at the Lanxess Arena in Cologne and at the AccorHotels Arena in Paris. On 8 November 2016, news of Collins's headline spot at a concert at London's Hyde Park was announced. On 16 December 2016, it was announced that Collins would play at Dublin's Aviva Stadium on Sunday 25 June 2017. On 27 February 2017, it was announced that Collins would play at Liverpool's Echo Arena on Friday 2 June 2017. On 8 June 2017, it was announced that Collins's cancelled concerts on 8 and 9 June would be rearranged for 26 and 27 November. The two concerts had been cancelled after Collins had tripped over a step in the bedroom of his London hotel (and had been taken to hospital) following a concert at the Royal Albert Hall on 7 June.

Due to ongoing nerve problems with his hands, this was the first tour where Collins did not play drums at any point in the show. Instead, he employed his son Nicholas to handle all drum parts. However, Collins did use a cajón during later parts of the tour.

== Set list ==
1. "Against All Odds"
2. "Another Day in Paradise"
3. "One More Night" (Played on the European leg)
4. "Wake Up Call" (Played in Liverpool until São Paulo)
5. "Throwing It All Away" (Played on the Latin American leg, on the North American leg, on the Oceanian leg, on the second European leg and on the United States leg)
6. "Follow You Follow Me"
7. "Can't Turn Back the Years" (Played on the European leg, on the North American leg and on the Oceanian leg)
8. "I Missed Again"
9. "Hang in Long Enough"
10. "Don't Lose My Number" (Played on the second European leg and on the United States leg)
11. "Separate Lives"
12. "Inside Out" (Played on the Oceanian leg)
13. "Only You Know and I Know" / "Who Said I Would"
14. "You'll Be in My Heart" (Played on the North American leg)

Intermission

15. Drum Duet (played on the European leg by Nicholas Collins and Luis Conte) / Drum Trio (played on the North American leg, on the Oceanian leg, on the second European leg and on the United States Leg by Nicholas Collins, Richie "Gajate" Garcia and Phil, who joins in on the cajon at the second part)
16. "I Don't Care Anymore" (Played on the European leg)
17. "Something Happened on the Way to Heaven"
18. "You Know What I Mean" (Played on the European leg, on the North American leg, on the Oceanian leg, on the second European leg and on the United States leg)
19. "In the Air Tonight"
20. "You Can't Hurry Love"
21. "Dance Into the Light"
22. "Invisible Touch"
23. "Easy Lover"
24. "Sussudio"

Encore

25. "If You Love Me (Really Love Me)" (Played in Liverpool, London and Cologne)
26. "Take Me Home"

== Tour dates ==
List of 2017 concerts
| Date | City | Country | Venue | Attendance | Revenue |
|---|---|---|---|---|---|
| 2 June 2017 | Liverpool | England | Echo Arena | —N/a | —N/a |
| 4 June 2017 | London | England | Royal Albert Hall | 12,884 / 12,884 | $1,521,220 |
| 5 June 2017 | London | England | Royal Albert Hall | 12,884 / 12,884 | $1,521,220 |
| 7 June 2017 | London | England | Royal Albert Hall | 12,884 / 12,884 | $1,521,220 |
| 11 June 2017 | Cologne | Germany | Lanxess Arena | 71,751 / 75,075 | $9,382,147 |
| 12 June 2017 | Cologne | Germany | Lanxess Arena | 71,751 / 75,075 | $9,382,147 |
| 14 June 2017 | Cologne | Germany | Lanxess Arena | 71,751 / 75,075 | $9,382,147 |
| 15 June 2017 | Cologne | Germany | Lanxess Arena | 71,751 / 75,075 | $9,382,147 |
| 16 June 2017 | Cologne | Germany | Lanxess Arena | 71,751 / 75,075 | $9,382,147 |
| 18 June 2017 | Paris | France | AccorHotels Arena | 62,071 / 63,210 | $10,683,116 |
| 19 June 2017 | Paris | France | AccorHotels Arena | 62,071 / 63,210 | $10,683,116 |
| 20 June 2017 | Paris | France | AccorHotels Arena | 62,071 / 63,210 | $10,683,116 |
| 22 June 2017 | Paris | France | AccorHotels Arena | 62,071 / 63,210 | $10,683,116 |
| 23 June 2017 | Paris | France | AccorHotels Arena | 62,071 / 63,210 | $10,683,116 |
| 25 June 2017 | Dublin | Ireland | Aviva Stadium | 37,609 / 40,000 | $4,435,265 |
| 30 June 2017 (Note: The 30 June 2017 concert in London was part of British Summer Time.) | London | England | Hyde Park | | |
| 22 November 2017 | Nottingham | England | Motorpoint Arena | | |
| 24 November 2017 | Sheffield | England | FlyDSA Arena | 7,539 / 7,539 | $924,675 |
| 26 November 2017 (Note: The 26 and 27 November 2017 concerts in London were originally scheduled to take place on 8 and 9 June 2017.) | London | England | Royal Albert Hall | —N/a | —N/a |
| 27 November 2017 | London | England | Royal Albert Hall | —N/a | —N/a |
| 29 November 2017 | Manchester | England | Manchester Arena | 9,955 / 10,943 | $1,268,120 |
| 1 December 2017 | Glasgow | Scotland | SSE Hydro | 9,288 / 9,578 | $1,197,320 |
| 2 December 2017 | Newcastle | England | Metro Radio Arena | 8,290 | $1,051,137 |
| 3 December 2017 | Birmingham | England | Genting Arena | 10,950 | $1,563,094 |

List of 2018 concerts
| Date | City | Country | Venue | Attendance | Revenue |
|---|---|---|---|---|---|
| 22 February 2018 | Rio de Janeiro | Brazil | Estádio do Maracanã | 36,267 / 36,267 | $3,558,445 |
| 24 February 2018 | São Paulo | Brazil | Allianz Parque | 82,662 / 94,292 | $9,505,515 |
| 25 February 2018 | São Paulo | Brazil | Allianz Parque | 82,662 / 94,292 | $9,505,515 |
| 27 February 2018 | Porto Alegre | Brazil | Estádio Beira-Rio | 18,072 / 18,072 | $1,404,845 |
| 6 March 2018 | Monterrey | Mexico | Auditorio Citibanamex | 5,795 / 6,207 | $838,410 |
| 7 March 2018 | Guadalajara | Mexico | Arena VFG | 8,774 / 10,993 | $894,833 |
| 9 March 2018 | Mexico City | Mexico | Palacio de los Deportes | 24,679 / 29,806 | $3,250,117 |
| 10 March 2018 | Mexico City | Mexico | Palacio de los Deportes | 24,679 / 29,806 | $3,250,117 |
| 13 March 2018 | Lima | Peru | Jockey Club Parcela H | —N/a | —N/a |
| 15 March 2018 | Santiago | Chile | Estadio Nacional Julio Martínez Prádanos | 52,460 / 54,144 | $5,304,606 |
| 17 March 2018 | Montevideo | Uruguay | Estadio Centenario | —N/a | —N/a |
| 19 March 2018 | Córdoba | Argentina | Estadio Presidente Perón | —N/a | —N/a |
| 20 March 2018 | Buenos Aires | Argentina | Campo Argentino de Polo | 54,339 / 55,478 | $5,867,636 |
| 23 March 2018 | San Juan | Puerto Rico | Coliseo José Miguel Agrelot | 15,108 / 15,113 | $1,620,614 |
| 5 October 2018 | Sunrise | United States | BB&T Center | 13,750 / 13,750 | $2,079,690 |
| 7 October 2018 | Washington, D.C. | United States | Capital One Arena | 13,840 / 13,840 | $2,039,170 |
| 8 October 2018 | Philadelphia | United States | Wells Fargo Center | 14,067 / 14,067 | $2,107,025 |
| 9 October 2018 | Boston | United States | TD Garden | 12,721 / 12,721 | $1,977,000 |
| 11 October 2018 | Toronto | Canada | Scotiabank Arena | 14,686 / 14,686 | $1,991,525 |
| 13 October 2018 | Newark | United States | Prudential Center | 13,489 / 13,489 | $1,978,240 |
| 14 October 2018 | New York City (Note: Labeled as Brooklyn in promotional material.) | United States | Barclays Center | 13,758 / 13,758 | $2,209,430 |
| 16 October 2018 | Montreal | Canada | Bell Centre | 15,529 / 15,529 | $1,845,054 |
| 18 October 2018 | Cleveland | United States | Quicken Loans Arena | 14,161 / 14,161 | $1,903,003 |
| 19 October 2018 | Columbus | United States | Nationwide Arena | 14,640 / 14,640 | $2,039,775 |
| 21 October 2018 | Minneapolis | United States | Target Center | 12,891 / 12,891 | $1,689,190 |
| 22 October 2018 | Chicago | United States | United Center | 14,850 / 14,850 | $2,330,529 |
| 25 October 2018 | Oakland | United States | Oracle Arena | 13,476 / 13,476 | $1,859,245 |
| 27 October 2018 | Las Vegas | United States | MGM Grand Garden Arena | 12,663 / 12,663 | $2,754,425 |
| 28 October 2018 | Inglewood (Note: Labeled as Los Angeles in promotional material.) | United States | The Forum | 13,866 / 13,866 | $2,573,801 |

List of 2019 concerts
| Date | City | Country | Venue | Attendance | Revenue |
|---|---|---|---|---|---|
| 19 January 2019 | Brisbane | Australia | Suncorp Stadium | 36,261 / 36,261 | $4,719,640 |
| 21 January 2019 | Sydney | Australia | Qudos Bank Arena | 37,100 / 40,098 | $5,692,308 |
| 22 January 2019 | Sydney | Australia | Qudos Bank Arena | 37,100 / 40,098 | $5,692,308 |
| 23 January 2019 | Sydney | Australia | Qudos Bank Arena | 37,100 / 40,098 | $5,692,308 |
| 25 January 2019 | Adelaide | Australia | Adelaide Oval | 23,048 / 23,048 | $2,675,500 |
| 28 January 2019 | Perth | Australia | RAC Arena | 25,159 / 25,159 | $3,842,770 |
| 29 January 2019 | Perth | Australia | RAC Arena | 25,159 / 25,159 | $3,842,770 |
| 1 February 2019 | Melbourne | Australia | AAMI Park | 49,705 / 49,880 | $7,250,053 |
| 2 February 2019 | Melbourne | Australia | AAMI Park | 49,705 / 49,880 | $7,250,053 |
| 4 February 2019 | Christchurch | New Zealand | AMI Stadium | 22,685 / 22,685 | $3,357,060 |
| 6 February 2019 | Napier | New Zealand | Mission Estate Winery | 27,736 / 27,736 | $3,236,910 |
| 2 June 2019 | Vienna | Austria | Ernst-Happel-Stadion | — | — |
| 4 June 2019 | Lyon | France | Groupama Stadium | 34,163 | — |
| 5 June 2019 | Stuttgart | Germany | Mercedes-Benz Arena | 34,038 / 34,038 | $4,180,299 |
| 7 June 2019 | Berlin | Germany | Olympiastadion | 52,126 / 58,014 | $6,254,767 |
| 8 June 2019 | Aarhus | Denmark | Ceres Park | — | — |
| 10 June 2019 | Bergen | Norway | Bergenhus Festning - Koengen | — | — |
| 12 June 2019 | Stockholm | Sweden | Friends Arena | — | — |
| 14 June 2019 | Hannover | Germany | HDI-Arena | 71,559 / 83,326 | $8,546,499 |
| 15 June 2019 | Hannover | Germany | HDI-Arena | 71,559 / 83,326 | $8,546,499 |
| 17 June 2019 | Milan | Italy | Mediolanum Forum | 6,864 / 6,864 | $1,154,770 |
| 18 June 2019 | Zürich | Switzerland | Stadion Letzigrund | 25,557 / 25,557 | $4,021,364 |
| 20 June 2019 | Nijmegen | Netherlands | Goffertpark | — | — |
| 21 June 2019 | Cologne | Germany | RheinEnergieStadion | 70,082 / 79,370 | $8,758,228 |
| 22 June 2019 | Cologne | Germany | RheinEnergieStadion | 70,082 / 79,370 | $8,758,228 |
| 24 June 2019 | Munich | Germany | Olympiastadion | 38,723 / 38,723 | $4,736,295 |
| 25 June 2019 | Prague | Czech Republic | O_{2} Arena | — | — |
| 26 June 2019 | Warsaw | Poland | PGE Narodowy | — | — |
| 23 September 2019 | Dallas | United States | American Airlines Center | 13,561 / 14,115 | $2,141,949 |
| 24 September 2019 | Houston | United States | Toyota Center | 12,483 / 12,483 | $1,992,305 |
| 26 September 2019 | Tampa | United States | Amalie Arena | 13,726 / 13,865 | $1,976,465 |
| 28 September 2019 | Duluth (Note: Labeled as Atlanta in promotional material.) | United States | Infinite Energy Arena | 10,691 / 10,691 | $1,884,425 |
| 29 September 2019 | Charlotte | United States | Spectrum Center | 14,532 / 14,532 | $1,963,910 |
| 1 October 2019 | Detroit | United States | Little Caesars Arena | 15,260 / 15,260 | $1,971,685 |
| 2 October 2019 | Pittsburgh | United States | PPG Paints Arena | 13,300 / 13,571 | $1,545,780 |
| 4 October 2019 | Buffalo | United States | KeyBank Center | — | — |
| 6 October 2019 | New York City | United States | Madison Square Garden | 26,568 / 26,568 | $4,202,395 |
| 7 October 2019 | New York City | United States | Madison Square Garden | 26,568 / 26,568 | $4,202,395 |
| 9 October 2019 | Louisville | United States | KFC Yum! Center | 13,360 / 13,360 | $1,634,735 |
| 11 October 2019 | Omaha | United States | CHI Health Center | — | — |
| 13 October 2019 | Denver | United States | Pepsi Center | — | — |
| 15 October 2019 | Phoenix | United States | Talking Stick Resort Arena | 12,644 / 12,644 | $1,885,480 |
| 17 October 2019 | San Francisco | United States | Chase Center | 12,181 / 12,430 | |
| 19 October 2019 | Las Vegas | United States | T-Mobile Arena | — | — |
| TOTAL | | | | — | — |

== Personnel ==
- Phil Collins – lead vocals, percussion (during the Drum Trio since the North American leg)
- Leland Sklar – bass
- Daryl Stuermer – lead guitar
- Ronnie Caryl – rhythm guitar, backing vocals
- Nic Collins – drums, piano (on You Know What I Mean)
- Brad Cole – keyboards, musical director
- Arnold McCuller – backing vocals (except the Paris, Dublin and Hyde Park dates)
- Amy Keys – backing vocals
- Bridgette Bryant – backing vocals
- Lamont van Hook – backing vocals
- Luis Conte – percussion (except the Dublin and Hyde Park dates and until the North American leg)
- Richie "Gajate" Garcia – percussion (for the Dublin and Hyde Park dates and since the North American leg)

Vine Street Horns

- Harry Kim – trumpet
- Dan Fornero – trumpet
- George Shelby – alto saxophone
- Luis Bonilla – trombone

== Attendance ==
- Pollstar 2017 mid-year: UK/Europe Tour (4 cities/16 shows): 166,204 tickets sold
- Pollstar Year End 2017: UK/Europe Tour (12 cities/24 shows): 284,152 tickets sold
- Pollstar: Latin America Tour 2018 ( 12 cities / 14 shows ): 352,285 tickets sold ( Gross: $38 million in U.S. dollars, with an average of $3.17 million per market )
- Pollstar Year End 2018 ( Nov. 23, 2017 through Nov. 21, 2018 ): 32 cities/34 shows with 606,694 tickets sold ( Gross: $75,5 Million )
- Pollstar Year End North American Tour 2018 ( 19 cities/20 shows ) 263,105 tickets sold ( Gross: $38 Million ).

== Support Act ==
- Blondie + Mike and The Mechanics: Dublin, Aviva Stadium
- Blondie + Mike and The Mechanics + Starsailor: London, Hyde Park, British Summer Time Festival 2017
- The Pretenders: Latin America Tour 2018
- Mike and The Mechanics: Vienna, Austria + Lyon, France + Stuttgart & Berlin, Germany + Aarhus, Denmark + Bergen, Norway ( Europe Tour 2019 )
- Sheryl Crow: Stockholm, Sweden + Hannover ( 2 shows ), Germany + Zürich, Switzerland + Nijmegen, Netherlands + Cologne ( 2 shows ), Germany ( Europe Tour 2019 )
- Douwe Bob: Nijmegen, Netherlands
- Chic and Nile Rodgers: Warsaw, Poland ( Europe 2019 )
- Wet Wet Wet: Munich, Germany ( Europe 2019 )
