= Phil Collins =

English musician (born 1951)

Phil Collins LVO
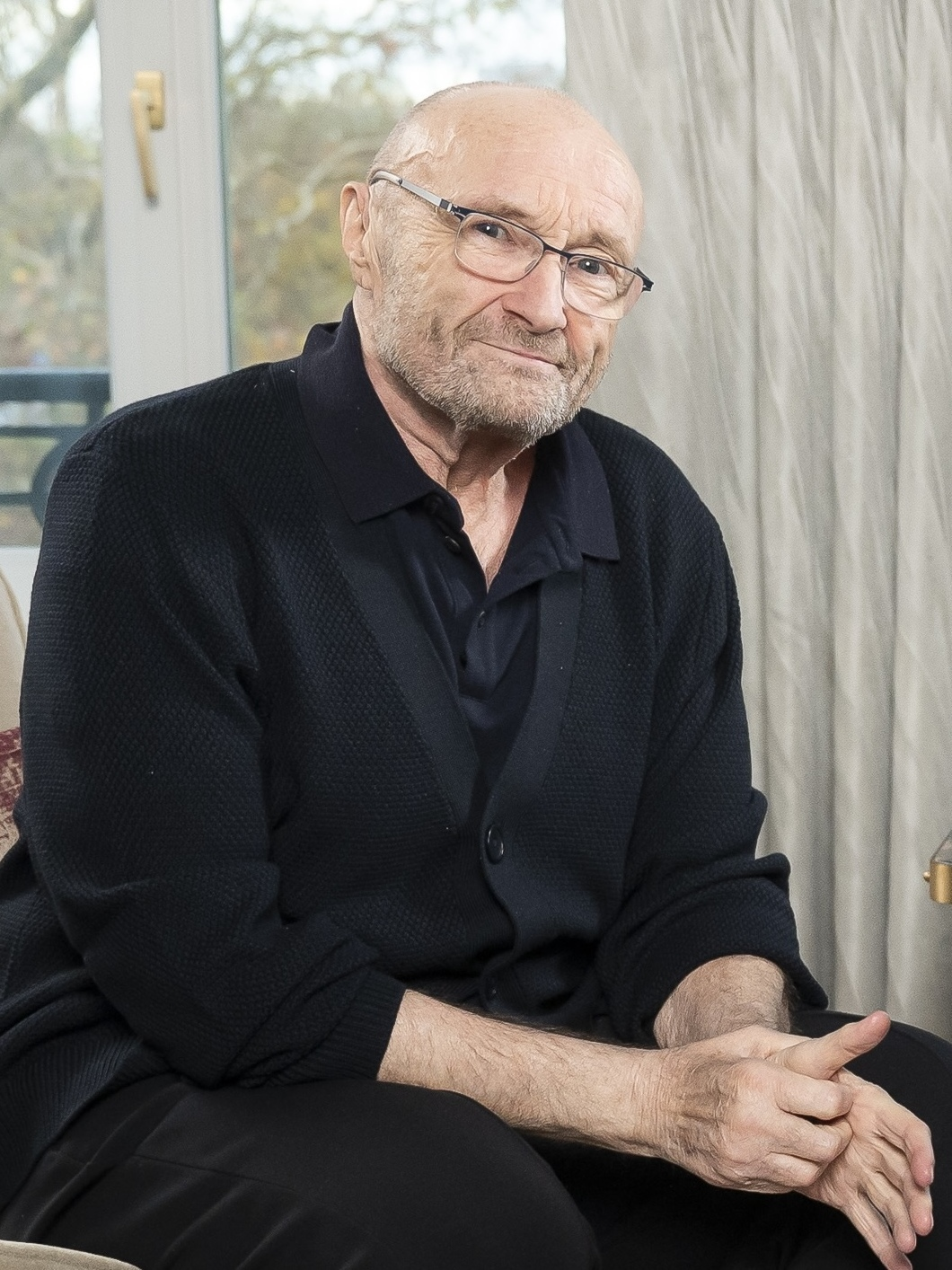
- Collins in 2025
- Born: Philip David Charles Collins; 30 January 1951 (age 75); Wandsworth, London, England
- Occupations: Musician; singer; songwriter; record producer; actor
- Years active: 1963–2011; 2015–present
- Spouses: Andrea Bertorelli (m. 1975; div. 1980) Jill Tavelman (m. 1984; div. 1996) Orianne Cevey (m. 1999; div. 2006)
- Children: Joely; Simon; Lily; Nic; Mathew
- Relatives: Clive Collins (brother)
- Awards: Full list
- Musical career
- Genres: Pop; rock
- Instruments: Vocals; drums; keyboards
- Labels: Virgin; Atlantic; WEA; Walt Disney; Rhino
- Formerly of: Brand X; Flaming Youth; Genesis
- Website: philcollins.com

Philip David Charles Collins (born 30 January 1951) is an English singer, songwriter, musician, record producer, and actor. He is best known as the drummer and later lead vocalist of the rock band Genesis, and for his highly successful solo career. Between 1982 and 1990, Collins achieved three UK and seven US number-one singles as a solo performer. His work with Genesis, his solo material, and collaborations with other prominent musicians resulted in more US top-40 singles than any other artist during the 1980s.

Born and raised in West London, Collins began playing drums at age five and completed training at a professional drama school. As a child actor, he secured stage and film roles, most notably playing the Artful Dodger in the West End production of the musical Oliver! He transitioned fully to a professional music career in 1970 upon joining Genesis as their drummer. Following the departure of original frontman Peter Gabriel in 1975, Collins assumed lead vocal duties for their most commercially successful era, spanning progressive rock into mainstream pop rock until his departure in 1996 to pursue solo projects. He returned for their reunion tours in 2007 and in 2021–2022, their final as a band. Concurrently, he performed as the drummer for the jazz fusion band Brand X (1975–1979) and formed the Phil Collins Big Band in 1996.

Collins launched his solo career with the release of Face Value (1981), an album heavily influenced by his first marital breakdown and love of soul music. This was followed by the multi-platinum albums Hello, I Must Be Going! (1982), No Jacket Required (1985), and ...But Seriously (1989), as well as international hit singles such as "In the Air Tonight", "Against All Odds (Take a Look at Me Now)", "Sussudio", and "Another Day in Paradise". He also became widely recognised for his distinctive "gated reverb" drum sound, which became part of 1980s pop and rock production. In July 1985, he was the only artist to perform at both Live Aid concerts. Following a five-year hiatus to focus on his family life, Collins returned in 2016 to release his memoir and completed the Not Dead Yet Tour.

One of the world's best-selling music artists, Collins has sold over 100 million albums worldwide with Genesis and as a solo artist, making him one of only three recording artists, alongside Paul McCartney and Michael Jackson, to have sold more than 100 million albums as a solo artist and in a band. His extensive accolades include eight Grammy Awards, six Brit Awards and Ivor Novello Awards, two Golden Globes, and an Academy Award for the music of Disney's Tarzan (1999). Ranked by Rolling Stone as one of the 100 Greatest Drummers of All Time, he was inducted into the Modern Drummer Hall of Fame in 2012. Collins was inducted into the Rock and Roll Hall of Fame as a member of Genesis in 2010 and as a solo artist in 2026.

== Early life ==
Philip David Charles Collins was born on 30 January 1951 at Putney Hospital in the Metropolitan Borough of Wandsworth, County of London. His mother, June Winifred (née Strange), worked in a toy shop and later as a theatrical agent at the Barbara Speake Stage School, an independent performing arts school, while his father, Greville Philip Austin Collins, was an insurance agent for London Assurance. Collins is the youngest of three children; his sister, Carole, competed as a professional ice skater and followed June's footsteps as a theatrical agent, while his brother, Clive, was a cartoonist. The family had moved twice by the time Collins reached the age of three, settling at 453 Hanworth Road in the Municipal Borough of Brentford and Chiswick.

Collins was given a toy drum kit for Christmas at the age of five, and later, his two uncles made him a makeshift set with triangles and tambourines that fitted into a suitcase. These were followed by more complete sets bought by June and Greville as Collins grew older. Collins practised by playing along to music on the television and radio. During a family holiday at Butlin's, a seven-year-old Collins entered a talent contest, singing "The Ballad of Davy Crockett"; he stopped the orchestra halfway through to tell them they were in the wrong key. The Beatles were a major early influence on him, including their drummer Ringo Starr. Collins followed the lesser-known London band the Action, whose drummer, Roger Powell, he would copy and whose work introduced him to the soul music of Motown and Stax Records. Collins was also influenced by the jazz and big band drummer Buddy Rich, whose opinion on the importance of the hi-hat prompted him to stop using a second bass drum and start using the hi-hat.

Collins received basic piano and music tuition from Greville's aunt at around the age of 12. Collins studied drum rudiments under Lloyd Ryan and later under Frank King, and considered this training "more helpful than anything else because they're used all the time. In any kind of funk or jazz drumming, the rudiments are always there." Collins never learned to read or write musical notation and devised his own system, which he regretted in later life. "I've always felt that if I could hum it, I could play it. For me, that was good enough, but that attitude is bad."

Collins attended Nelson Primary School in Twickenham, Middlesex, until 1962, when he was accepted into Chiswick County Grammar School. There, Collins took to football and formed the Real Thing, a school band that had his future wife Andrea Bertorelli and friend Lavinia Lang as backup singers; both women would have an impact on Collins's personal life in later years. Collins's next group was the Freehold, with whom he wrote his first song, "Lying, Crying, Dying", and played in a group named the Charge. Collins was childhood friends with Jack Wild, who would become famous for playing the Artful Dodger in the musical drama film Oliver! (1968). June spotted Wild when he and Collins were playing football together in the park, and the boys both attended the Barbara Speake Stage School.

== Career ==
=== 1963–1970: Early acting roles and bands ===
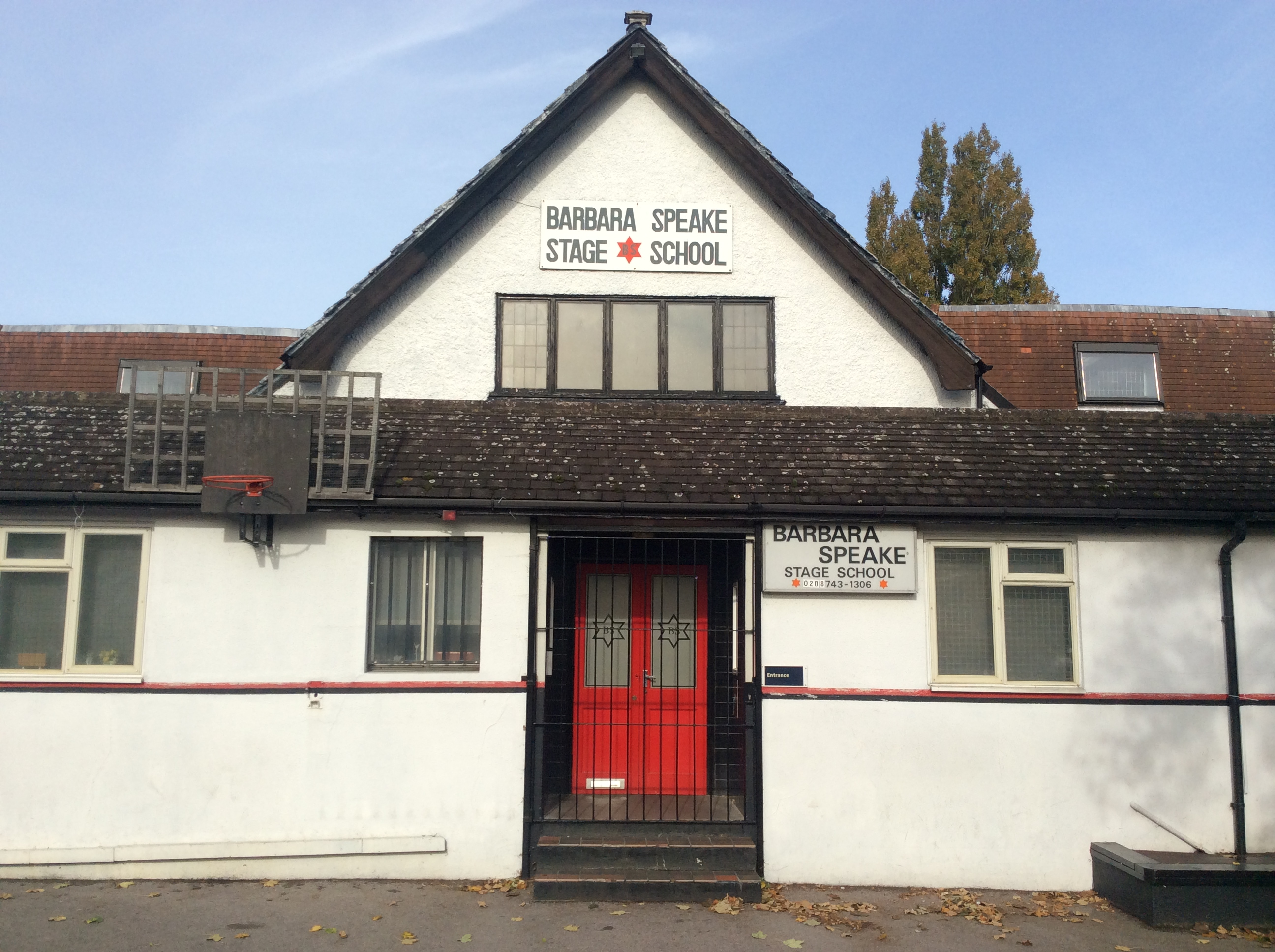
Collins attended the Barbara Speake stage school in East Acton, west London.

Collins quit school at the age of 14 to become a full-time pupil at Barbara Speake. He had an uncredited part as an extra in the Beatles' film A Hard Day's Night (1964), where he is among the screaming teenagers during the television concert sequence. Later in 1964, Collins was cast as the Artful Dodger in two West End runs of the musical Oliver! He was paid £15 a week, and called the role "the best part for a kid in all London". His days as the Dodger were numbered when his voice broke during a performance and had to speak his lines for the rest of the show. Collins starred in Calamity the Cow (1967), a film produced by the Children's Film Foundation. After a falling out with the director, Collins decided to quit acting to pursue music. He was to appear in Chitty Chitty Bang Bang (1968) as one of the children who storm the castle, but his scene was cut. Collins auditioned for the role of Romeo in Romeo and Juliet (1968), but the role went to Leonard Whiting. In 1967, he travelled the UK teaching people the "crunch" dance made popular by a Smith's crisps advertising campaign.

Collins's enthusiasm for music grew during his acting years. He frequented the Marquee Club on Wardour Street so often that eventually the managers asked him to set out the chairs, sweep the floors, and assist in the cloakroom. It was here where Collins saw the Action and newcomers Yes perform, which greatly influenced him. When auditions for Vinegar Joe and Manfred Mann Chapter Three were unsuccessful, Collins secured a position in the Cliff Charles Blues Band and toured the country. This was followed by a stint in the Gladiators, a backing band for a black vocal quartet, which included Collins's schoolmate Ronnie Caryl on guitar. Around this time, Collins learned that Yes were looking for a new drummer and spoke to frontman Jon Anderson, who invited him to an audition the following week. Collins failed to turn up.

In 1969, Collins and Caryl joined John Walker's backing band for a European tour, which included guitarist Gordon Smith and keyboardist Brian Chatton. The tour finished, and the quartet formed a rock band, Hickory, which recorded one single ("Green Light"/"The Key"). Still in 1969, they were renamed Flaming Youth. They signed to Fontana Records and recorded Ark 2 (1969), a concept album written and produced by Ken Howard and Alan Blaikley that tells the story of man's evacuation from a burning Earth and its voyage into space. Each member sings a lead vocal.

In May 1970, after Flaming Youth split, Collins played congas on George Harrison's song "Art of Dying", but his contribution was omitted. Years later, Collins asked Harrison about the omission. Harrison sent Collins a recording allegedly containing Collins's performance; Collins was embarrassed to hear that the performance was poor. When Collins apologised, Harrison confessed that the recording was a prank, which Collins accepted in good humour.

=== 1970–1980: Genesis, later role as lead singer, and Brand X ===
In July 1970, the rock band Genesis had signed with Charisma Records and recorded their second album Trespass (1970), but suffered a setback following the departure of guitarist Anthony Phillips. They decided that their drummer John Mayhew, though talented, was not of the high calibre they wanted, and placed an advert in the Melody Maker for a drummer "sensitive to acoustic music" and a 12-string acoustic guitarist. Collins recognised Charisma owner Tony Stratton Smith's name on it, who he had been acquainted with for years, and he and Caryl went for the auditions. The group, who had been a full-time working band for less than a year, consisted of school friends from Charterhouse School, a private boarding school: singer Peter Gabriel, keyboardist Tony Banks, and bassist/guitarist Mike Rutherford. Collins and Caryl arrived early, so Collins took a swim in the pool at Gabriel's parents' house and memorised the pieces the drummers before him were playing. He recalled: "They put on Trespass, and my initial impression was of a very soft and round music, not edgy, with vocal harmonies, and I came away thinking Crosby, Stills and Nash." Gabriel, a former drummer, said he could tell just by the way Collins sat in front of the drum kit that he knew what he was doing, and was also impressed when Collins mentioned the session with George Harrison. On 8 August 1970, Collins became their fourth drummer. Genesis then took a two-week holiday, during which Collins earned money as an exterior decorator. Rutherford thought Caryl was not a good fit, and for over a month Genesis wrote songs, rehearsed, and toured as a four-piece. In January 1971, the band enlisted Steve Hackett.

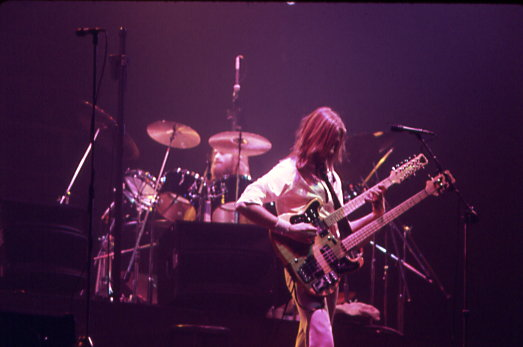
Collins on drums, with Genesis bandmate Mike Rutherford on twelve-string guitar, on stage in Toronto, 3 June 1977

From 1970 to 1975, Collins played drums, percussion, and backing vocals on Genesis albums and concerts. Rutherford commented:

"On drums Phil was immediately a huge lift. We had never had that kind of energy from the engine room before; it was just a whole different level."

Rutherford and Banks continued to contribute vocal harmonies to songs like "Harlequin", but before long Collins became the group's primary backing vocalist, since they found multi-tracking Collins and Gabriel's vocals was faster and produced better results than all four of them singing. They also discovered that Collins and Gabriel's singing voices were so similar that when they sang a part together, it sounded like one exceptionally strong voice rather than two voices. This technique was employed on the band's first hit single, "I Know What I Like (In Your Wardrobe)".

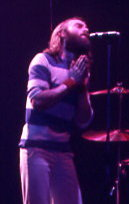
Collins on tour with Genesis in 1977, their second with him as lead vocalist following Gabriel's departure

During this period Collins participated in the songwriting jams which produced much of Genesis's material, but did little independent songwriting compared to the other four members. Collins's more notable songwriting contributions during 1970-75 include composing the staccato rhythm which acts as the main theme of the live favourite "Watcher of the Skies". His first album as a member, Nursery Cryme, features the acoustic song "For Absent Friends" that has Collins singing lead vocal. He sang "More Fool Me" on their 1973 album Selling England by the Pound, and on the subsequent tour, marking the first time he assumed the role of Genesis lead vocalist in a live setting. In 1974, Collins played drums on "Mother Whale Eyeless", the 4th song of Eno's second album Taking Tiger Mountain (By Strategy) after Eno had contributed electronic effects to two songs on The Lamb Lies Down on Broadway.

In August 1975, Gabriel's departure from the band was publicly announced. Genesis advertised for a replacement in Melody Maker and received around 400 replies. After a lengthy auditioning process, during which he sang backup vocals for applicants, Collins became the band's lead vocalist during the recording of their album A Trick of the Tail. The album was a commercial and critical success, reaching number three in the UK Albums Chart and 31 in the US. Rolling Stone wrote that Genesis "has managed to turn the possible catastrophe of Gabriel's departure into their first broad-based American success." For the tour, former Yes and King Crimson drummer Bill Bruford played drums on sections where Collins sang. In 1976, Collins brought in American drummer Chester Thompson, formerly of Frank Zappa and Weather Report, who became a mainstay of Genesis's and Collins's backing bands until 2010. When Collins, Banks, and Rutherford decided to continue Genesis as a trio in 1977, they recorded ...And Then There Were Three.... This included the band's first UK Top 10 and US Top 40 single, "Follow You Follow Me". The level of commercial success that Genesis had reached by this time allowed Collins and his wife to move into Old Croft, a home in Shalford, Surrey, in the spring of 1978.

Collins pursued various guest spots and solo projects from his time as Genesis's drummer. In 1973, he and Hackett performed on the solo debut of ex-Yes guitarist Peter Banks. In 1975, Collins sang and played drums, vibraphone, and percussion on Hackett's first solo album, Voyage of the Acolyte; performed on Eno's albums Another Green World, Before and After Science, and Music for Films; and replaced drummer Phil Spinelli of the jazz fusion group Brand X before recording their first two albums, Unorthodox Behaviour and Moroccan Roll. Collins played percussion on Johnny the Fox by Thin Lizzy, and sang on Anthony Phillips' debut solo album, The Geese & the Ghost. In 1978, he played drums and percussion on Andrew Lloyd Webber's album Variations.

After Genesis finished touring in December 1978, the group went on hiatus after Collins went to Vancouver, Canada, to try to save his troubled marriage. The attempt failed, leaving his wife to return to England with their children while living apart from Collins, who returned to their home in Surrey. Their divorce was finalised in 1981. Banks and Rutherford were recording their first solo albums during this time, so Collins rejoined Brand X for their album Product and its accompanying tour. He also played on John Martyn's album Grace and Danger and started writing demos of his own at home. This was followed by Genesis resuming activity, recording and touring with their album Duke (1980). Collins was becoming more involved as a songwriter, with Banks saying that he was "coming up much more to be a kind of equal" in the band on Duke. Collins wrote "Please Don't Ask" and "Misunderstanding" for the album. It became their first album to reach number one in the UK and was their most successful to date in the US, reaching number 11.

=== 1981–1984: Solo debut with Face Value and Hello, I Must Be Going! ===
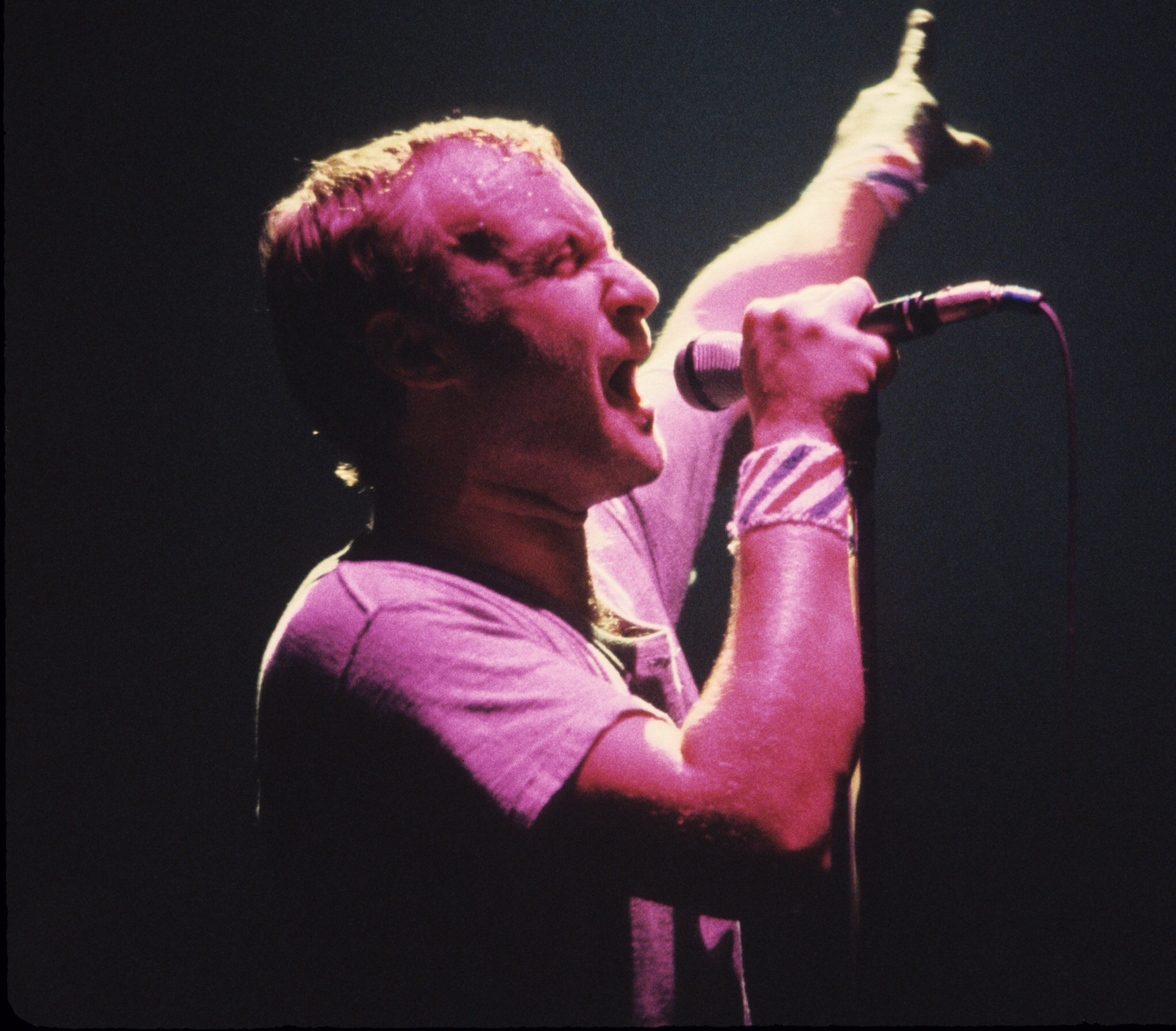
Collins performing in 1981

In February 1981, Collins released his debut solo album, Face Value. He signed with Virgin Records and WEA for American distribution in order to distance himself from the Charisma label, and oversaw every step of its production; he wrote the liner notes himself and by hand. His divorce was the focus of its lyrical themes and song titles: "I had a wife, two children, two dogs, and the next day I didn't have anything. So a lot of these songs were written because I was going through these emotional changes." Collins produced the album in collaboration with Hugh Padgham, with whom he had worked on Peter Gabriel's self-titled 1980 album. Face Value reached number one in seven countries, including the UK, and number seven in the US, where it went on to sell five million copies. "In the Air Tonight", the album's lead single, reached number two in the UK singles chart. The song is known for the gated reverb effect used on Collins' drums, a technique developed by Padgham when he worked as an engineer on Gabriel's song "Intruder", on which Collins played drums.

Following an invitation by record producer Martin Lewis, Collins performed live as a solo artist at an Amnesty International benefit show The Secret Policeman's Other Ball at the Theatre Royal, Drury Lane in London in September 1981, performing "In the Air Tonight" and "The Roof Is Leaking". Collins worked again with John Martyn in this year, producing his album Glorious Fool. In September 1981, Genesis released Abacab. This was followed by its 1981 supporting tour and a two-month tour in 1982 promoting the Genesis live album Three Sides Live. In early 1982, Collins produced and played on Something's Going On, the third solo album by Anni-Frid Lyngstad of ABBA, and performed most of the drum parts on Pictures at Eleven, the first solo album by Led Zeppelin singer Robert Plant. In October 1982, Collins took part in the one-off Genesis reunion concert Six of the Best held at the Milton Keynes Bowl in Buckinghamshire, which marked the return of Gabriel on lead vocals and Hackett on guitar.

Collins's second solo album, Hello, I Must Be Going!, was released in November 1982. His marital problems continued to provide inspiration for his songs, including "I Don't Care Anymore" and "Do You Know, Do You Care". The album reached number two in the UK and number eight in the US, where it sold three million copies. Its second single, a cover of "You Can't Hurry Love" by the Supremes, became Collins's first UK number one single and went to number ten in the US. Collins supported the album with the Hello, I Must Be Going! tour of Europe and North America from November 1982 to February 1983. Following the tour, Collins played drums on Plant's second solo album, The Principle of Moments, and produced and played on two tracks for Adam Ant's album Strip, "Puss 'n Boots" and the title track. In spring 1983, Collins, Banks and Rutherford recorded the self-titled Genesis album, which was released in October that year; its tour ended with five shows in Birmingham, England, in February 1984. The latter shows were filmed and released as Genesis Live – The Mama Tour.

=== 1984–1989: No Jacket Required and commercial ubiquity ===
"Against All Odds"
"Against All Odds" from the soundtrack of the same name (1984), is a power ballad which became his first Billboard Hot 100 No. 1 single. It again featured his signature gated reverb drum sound.

Collins wrote and recorded "Against All Odds", the main theme for the American romantic film of the same name, which demonstrated a more pop-orientated and commercially accessible sound than his previous work. Released in February 1984, it was the first single of his solo career to reach number one on the Billboard Hot 100 chart; it peaked at number two in the UK. Collins won a Grammy Award for Best Pop Vocal Performance, Male. The song earned him an Academy Award nomination for Best Original Song, and he arranged his 1985 tour to accommodate the possibility of performing it at the awards ceremony. However, a note to Atlantic Records from show producer Larry Gelbart explaining a lack of invitation stated: "Thank you for your note regarding Phil Cooper [sic]. I'm afraid the spots have already been filled", and Collins watched actress and dancer Ann Reinking perform it. The Los Angeles Times said: "Reinking did an incredible job of totally destroying a beautiful song." Collins would introduce it at subsequent concerts by saying: "I'm sorry Miss Ann Reinking couldn't be here tonight; I guess I just have to sing my own song."

In 1984, Collins contributed to the production on Chinese Wall by Earth, Wind & Fire vocalist Philip Bailey, which included a duet from the two, "Easy Lover". The song was number one in the UK for four weeks, and peaked at number two in the US. He produced and played drums on several tracks on Behind the Sun by Eric Clapton. In November, Collins was part of the charity supergroup Band Aid in aid of Ethiopian famine relief and played drums on its single, "Do They Know It's Christmas?".

Collins's third album, No Jacket Required, was recorded in 1984 and marked a turning point in his output. He departed from lyrics about his personal life and wrote more upbeat and dance-oriented songs with strong hooks and melodies, with Collins stating beforehand, "I have a notion of what I want to do: break out of this 'love song' box that I've found myself in. I'll make a dance album. Or, at least, an album with a couple of uptempo tracks." Sting, Peter Gabriel, and Helen Terry contributed backing vocals. No Jacket Required was released in February 1985 and became a huge worldwide success, reaching number one in several countries. "Sussudio" and "One More Night" topped the US singles chart, the latter reaching number four in the UK to become his fourth solo UK top ten, and "Don't Lose My Number" and "Take Me Home" made the US top ten. The album remains the most successful of his career, selling over 12 million copies in the US, where it was certified diamond, and 1.9 million in the UK, where it was the second-best-selling album of 1985.

Referring to the album's success, David Fricke of Rolling Stone wrote: "After years on the art-rock fringe, Collins has established himself firmly in the middle of the road. Perhaps he should consider testing himself and his new fans' expectations next time around." "Sussudio" attracted negative attention for sounding too similar to Prince's "1999", a charge that Collins did not deny. No Jacket Required earned Collins the first two of his six Brit Awards, winning Best British Male and Best British Album. Collins had three US number one songs in 1985, the most by any artist that year. No Jacket Required won three Grammy Awards including Album of the Year.

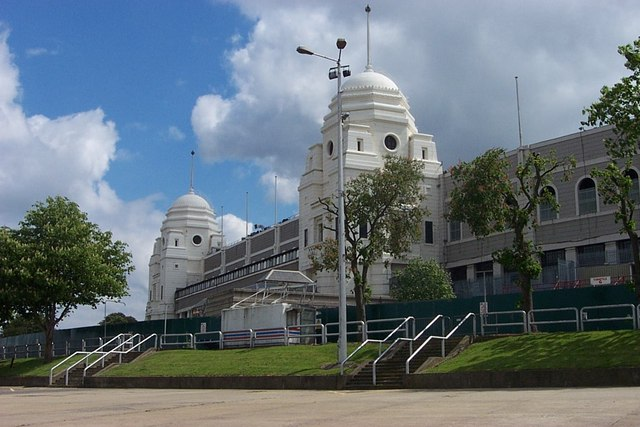
On 13 July 1985, Collins played at Live Aid at the old Wembley Stadium (exterior pictured) in London, before taking a transatlantic Concorde flight to perform at the Philadelphia leg of the event later that day.

The No Jacket Required World Tour saw Collins perform 85 shows between February and July 1985. On 13 July, Collins took part in the Live Aid concerts, a continuation of the fundraising effort started by Band Aid. Collins was the only performer to appear at the London concert at Wembley Stadium and the US concert at JFK Stadium in Philadelphia on the same day. After performing what Ultimate Classic Rock called "an especially crowd-pleasing selection of songs" in London, including "Against All Odds", "In the Air Tonight", and playing alongside Sting, Collins flew to Philadelphia on a Concorde to perform his solo material, play drums for Clapton, and drum with Plant and Jimmy Page for a Led Zeppelin reunion. The latter performance was poorly received and later disowned by the band. Page later said that Collins had not learned his parts for the set. Collins responded that the band "weren't very good", that a "dribbling" Page had made him feel uncomfortable, and he only continued with the set rather than leave the stage in order to avoid negative attention. In November 1985, the song "Separate Lives", a duet featuring Collins and Marilyn Martin for the musical drama film White Nights, was released and became a US number one hit.

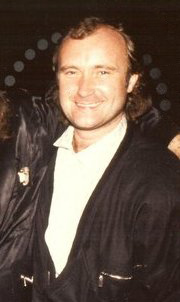
Collins in the 1980s

By the end of 1985, the music press noted that Collins's success as a solo artist had made him more popular than Genesis. Before the release of No Jacket Required, Collins insisted that he would not leave the band and that he felt "happier with what we're doing now, because I feel it's closer to me." In October 1985, he reunited with Banks and Rutherford to record Genesis's thirteenth album, Invisible Touch. Released in 1986, it became the group's biggest selling album with six million copies sold in the US, and 1.2 million sold in the UK. Its title track was released as a single and reached No. 1 in the US, the only Genesis song to do so. The group received a Grammy Award (their only one) and a nomination for the MTV Video Music Award for Video of the Year in 1987 for "Land of Confusion", which features puppet caricatures from the satirical television programme Spitting Image. Several music critics drew comparisons between the album and Collins's solo work, but Rolling Stone's J. D. Considine praised the album's commercial appeal, stating, "every tune is carefully pruned so that each flourish delivers not an instrumental epiphany but a solid hook". March 1986 saw the release of "No One Is to Blame", a hit single by Howard Jones which included Collins on drums, backing vocals, and co-production alongside Padgham. Collins provided backing vocals, produced and played drums on most of Eric Clapton's 1986 album August. He toured parts of Europe with Clapton in support of the album, of which two concert videos were released; Live at Montreux 1986 and Eric Clapton and Friends Live 1986. In each of those videos, Collins is featured as the drummer and performs "In the Air Tonight" with Clapton, bassist Nathan East and keyboardist Greg Phillinganes backing him.

After touring with Genesis in 1987, Collins was aware that his music had gained too much exposure and took a year off from writing and recording. He took on his first acting role since the late 1960s, starring as Buster Edwards opposite Julie Walters (who played his wife, June) in the romantic comedy drama-crime film Buster which centred around the Great Train Robbery from 1963 in Ledburn, Buckinghamshire. Reviews for the film were mixed and controversy ensued over its subject matter; Prince Charles and Princess Diana declined an invitation to the première after it was accused of glorifying crime. Collins contributed four songs to the film's soundtrack; his ballad rendition of "A Groovy Kind of Love", originally by the Mindbenders, became his only single to reach No. 1 in the UK and the US. The film spawned the US No. 1 single "Two Hearts", which he co-wrote with Lamont Dozier and won the pair a Golden Globe for Best Original Song and an Oscar nomination in the same category. Film critic Roger Ebert said Collins "played [the role of Buster] with surprising effectiveness". In 1988, Collins was the subject of an episode of the British TV series This Is Your Life. In 1989, Collins was among the musicians who donated their own clothes to Madame Tussaud's Rock Circus, an exhibition held at the London Pavilion celebrating the history of rock and pop music featuring its major figures recreated in wax.

=== 1989–1995: ...But Seriously, Both Sides, and leaving Genesis ===
"Another Day in Paradise"
A sample of "Another Day in Paradise" from ...But Seriously (1989). Collins wrote the song to bring attention to the problem of homelessness. It became his final Billboard Hot 100 No. 1 single.

In August 1989, Collins appeared as a special guest for the Who on their 1989 tour for two shows, performing "Fiddle About" as Uncle Ernie and "Tommy's Holiday Camp" from their rock opera Tommy (1969).

From April to October 1989, Collins recorded his fourth album ...But Seriously in England and the United States, which saw him address social and political themes in his lyrics. The album was released in November 1989 to worldwide commercial success, spending fifteen weeks at No. 1 in the UK charts and in the US for three. It became the UK's best-selling album of 1990 and is among the best-selling albums in UK chart history. It is one of the best-selling albums in Germany. Its lead single "Another Day in Paradise" is an anti-homelessness song and features David Crosby singing backing vocals. Upon its release in October 1989, it went to No. 1 in the US to become the final number one single there of the 1980s. Despite its success, the song was heavily criticised and became linked to allegations of hypocrisy made against Collins. Responding to criticism of the song, Collins stated: "When I drive down the street, I see the same things everyone else sees. It's a misconception that if you have a lot of money you're somehow out of touch with reality." In 1991, "Another Day in Paradise" won the Grammy Award for Record of the Year. Other songs from ...But Seriously reached the top-five in the US: "Something Happened on the Way to Heaven", "Do You Remember?", and "I Wish It Would Rain Down", the latter featuring Eric Clapton on guitar.

...But Seriously was supported with the Seriously, Live! World Tour which ran between February and October 1990 and covered 121 dates. The tour spawned the live album Serious Hits... Live!, which sold 1.2 million copies in the UK and over four million in the US. In February 1990, Collins performed "Another Day in Paradise" at the 1990 Brit Awards which won British Single of the Year, and in September he performed "Sussudio" at the 1990 MTV Video Music Awards in Los Angeles. He also played drums on the 1989 Tears for Fears single "Woman in Chains".

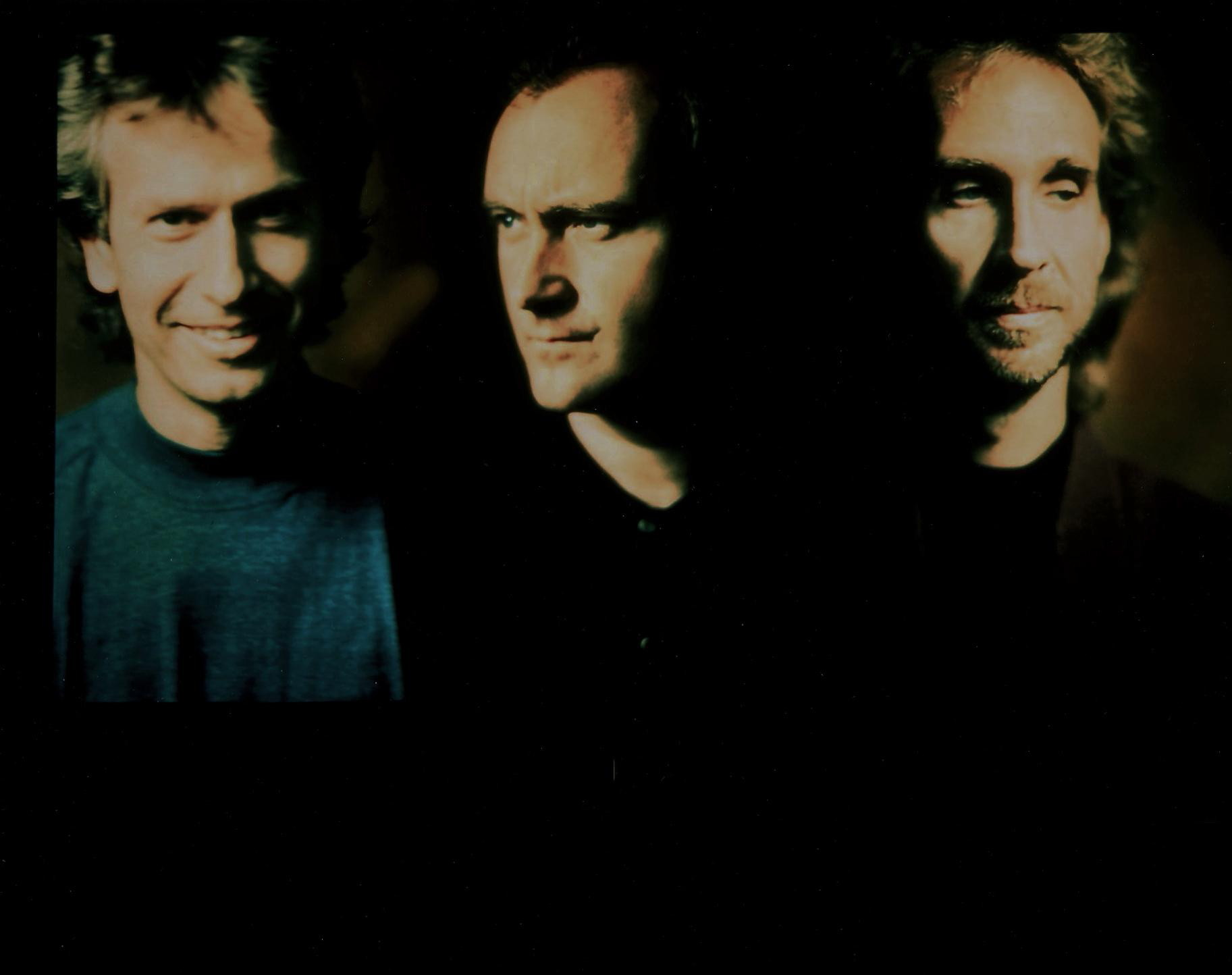
Promotional photo of Genesis in 1991: Banks, Collins and Rutherford

In 1991, Collins reconvened with Banks and Rutherford to write and record a new Genesis album, We Can't Dance. It became the band's fifth consecutive No. 1 album in the UK and reached No. 4 in the US, where it sold over four million copies. It features the singles "Jesus He Knows Me", "I Can't Dance", "No Son of Mine", and "Hold on My Heart". Collins performed on their 1992 tour. At the 1993 American Music Awards, Genesis won the award for Favorite Pop/Rock Band, Duo, or Group. Collins co-wrote, sang and played on the 1993 single "Hero" by David Crosby.

Collins worked on his fifth studio album, Both Sides, in 1992 and 1993. It marked a departure from his more polished and up-tempo songs on recent albums to material more experimental in nature, with Collins performing all the instruments and producing the record himself, because the songs written "were becoming so personal, so private, I didn't want anyone else's input". The decline of his second marriage was a focal point of the album. Released in November 1993, Both Sides reached No. 1 in eight countries, including the UK, and No. 13 in the US. It marked a drop in sales in the latter when compared to his previous records, only reaching a single platinum certification by the end of the year. Its two biggest singles were "Both Sides of the Story" and "Everyday". The Both Sides of the World Tour saw Collins perform 165 shows across four legs between April 1994 and May 1995. Collins turned down the chance to contribute to Tower of Song: The Songs of Leonard Cohen, an album of covers of Leonard Cohen songs, due to his touring commitments.

=== 1996–2006: Phil Collins Big Band, Dance into the Light, Disney work, and Testify ===
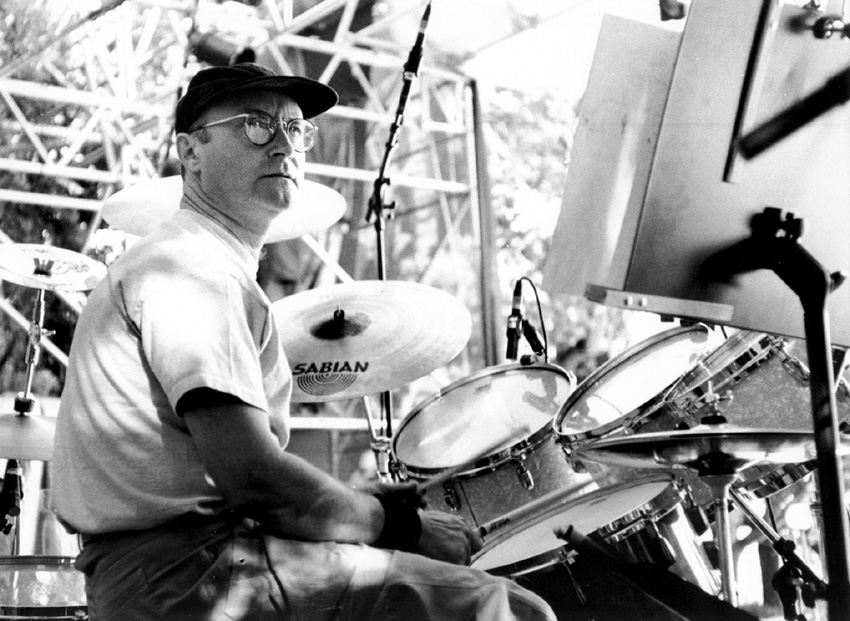
Collins performing with his big band in 1997

On 29 March 1996, Collins's decision to leave Genesis to concentrate on his solo career was publicly announced. In the months surrounding his departure from Genesis, Collins formed the Phil Collins Big Band, seating himself on the drums. He had wanted to undertake the project for some time and felt inspired from the Burning for Buddy project that drummer Neil Peart had put together. Having moved to Switzerland, an invitation to perform at the Montreux Jazz Festival led to the band coming together, which featured Quincy Jones as conductor and Tony Bennett on vocals. The group toured summer jazz festivals in July 1996 with a set of jazz renditions of Genesis and Collins's solo material. Their first date was at the Royal Albert Hall for a Prince's Trust concert with Queen Elizabeth II and Nelson Mandela in attendance. To learn his parts, Collins devised his own notation on sheets. The band then went on hiatus until a US and European tour in the summer of 1998, which spawned the live album A Hot Night in Paris.

In October 1996, Collins released his sixth solo album, Dance into the Light. It reached No. 4 in the UK and No. 23 in the US. The album was received negatively by the music press and sold less than his previous albums. Entertainment Weekly reviewed by saying that "even Phil Collins must know that we all grew weary of Phil Collins". Singles from the album included "Dance into the Light", which reached No. 9 in the UK, and the Beatles-inspired "It's in Your Eyes". The album was certified Gold in the US. Collins toured the album throughout 1997 with his Trip into the Light World Tour, covering 82 dates. He performed "In the Air Tonight" and "Take Me Home" at the Music for Montserrat benefit concert in London alongside Paul McCartney, Elton John, Eric Clapton, Mark Knopfler, and Sting.

In October 1998, Collins released his first compilation album, ...Hits, which contained a new track, a cover of "True Colors" by Cyndi Lauper, produced by Kenneth "Babyface" Edmonds. The album was a commercial success worldwide, reaching No. 1 in the UK charts and selling 3.4 million copies in the US by 2012.

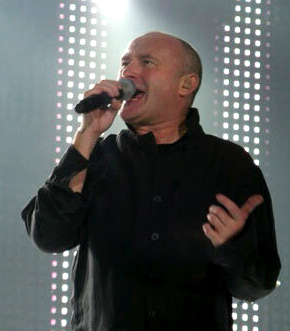
Collins on his First Farewell Tour in 2005

In the mid-1990s Collins was recruited to write and perform songs for Disney's adventure film Tarzan (1999), integrated with a score by Mark Mancina. Collins also sang his songs in French, Italian, German, and Spanish for the dubbed versions of the film's soundtrack. His song "You'll Be in My Heart" was released in June 1999 and spent 19 weeks at No. 1 on the Billboard Adult Contemporary chart, the longest time ever up to that point. In 2000, the song won Collins an Academy Award and a Golden Globe Award, both for Best Original Song. He performed "Two Worlds" at that year's ceremony and the Disney-themed Super Bowl halftime show.

In June 1999, Collins was awarded a star on the Hollywood Walk of Fame. In 2000, he became partially deaf in one ear due to a viral infection. In June 2002, Collins accepted an invitation to drum for the house band at the Party at the Palace concert held on the grounds of Buckingham Palace, an event which celebrated Queen Elizabeth II's Golden Jubilee. In 2002, he received the Disney Legend award.

On 11 November 2002, Collins released his seventh solo album, Testify. Metacritic's roundup of album reviews found this record to be the worst-reviewed album at the time of its release, though it has since been surpassed by three more recent releases. The album's single "Can't Stop Loving You" (a Leo Sayer cover) was a number-one Adult Contemporary hit. Testify sold 140,000 copies in the US by year's end.

Disney hired Collins to compose and perform on the soundtrack to its 2003 animated feature Brother Bear, which included the song "Look Through My Eyes". In the same year he was inducted into the Songwriters Hall of Fame. In 2004, Collins released two compilation albums, The Platinum Collection and Love Songs. From June 2004 to November 2005, Collins performed his First Final Farewell Tour, visiting 28 countries, including the United States, the United Kingdom, Germany, France and Israel. The tour’s name referred to the multiple farewell tours of other popular artists.

=== 2006–2014: First Genesis reunion, Going Back, and retirement ===
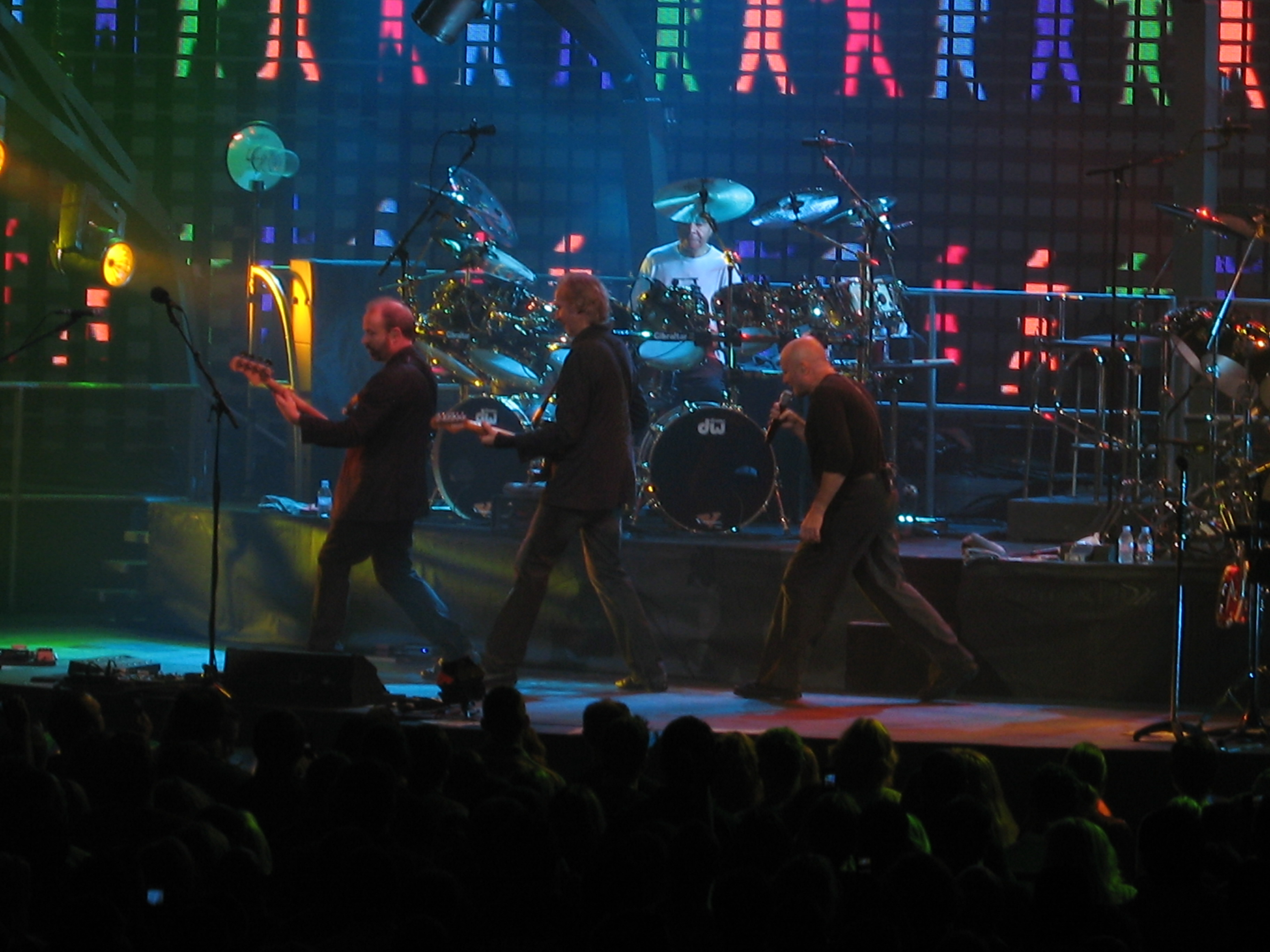
Collins (right) performing with Genesis in 2007

Collins reunited with Banks and Rutherford and announced Turn It On Again: The Tour on 7 November 2006, nearly 40 years after the band first formed. The tour took place during summer 2007, and played in twelve countries across Europe, followed by a second leg in North America. During the tour Genesis performed at the Live Earth concert at Wembley Stadium, London. In 2007, they were honoured at the second annual VH1 Rock Honors, performing "Turn It On Again", "No Son of Mine" and "Los Endos" at the ceremony in Las Vegas. On 22 May 2008, Collins received his sixth Ivor Novello Award from the British Academy of Songwriters, Composers and Authors when he was presented the International Achievement Award at a ceremony held at the Grosvenor House Hotel, London.

In October 2009, it was reported that Collins was to record a Motown covers album. He told a German newspaper, "I want the songs to sound exactly like the originals", and that the album would feature up to 30 songs. In January 2010, Chester Thompson said that the album had been completed and would be released some time soon. He also revealed that Collins managed to play the drums on the album despite a spinal operation. The resulting album, Going Back, was released on 13 September 2010. It reached number one on the UK Albums Chart. In summer 2010, Collins played six concerts with the music from Going Back. These included a special programme, Phil Collins: One Night Only, aired on ITV1 on 18 September 2010. Collins also promoted Going Back with his first and only appearance on the BBC's music series Later... with Jools Holland, broadcast on 17 September 2010.

In March 2010, Collins was inducted into the Rock and Roll Hall of Fame as a member of Genesis at a ceremony in New York City. As of January 2011, Collins has spent 1,730 weeks in the German music charts—766 weeks of them with Genesis albums and singles and 964 weeks with solo releases. On 4 March 2011, citing health problems and other concerns, Collins announced that he was taking time off from his career, prompting widespread reports of his retirement. On 7 March his UK representative told the press, "He is not, has no intention of, retiring." Later that day, Collins posted a message to his fans on his own website, confirming his intention to retire to focus on his family life. In July 2012, Collins's greatest hits collection ...Hits re-entered the US charts, reaching No. 6 on the Billboard 200.

In November 2013, Collins told German media that he was considering a return to music and speculated that this could mean further live shows with Genesis, stating: "Everything is possible. We could tour in Australia and South America. We haven't been there yet." Speaking to reporters in Miami, Florida in December 2013 at an event promoting his charity work, Collins indicated that he was writing music once again and might tour again.

On 24 January 2014, Collins announced in an interview with Inside South Florida that he was writing new compositions with fellow English singer Adele. Collins said he had no idea who Adele was when he learned she wanted to collaborate with him. He said, "I wasn't actually too aware [of her]. I live in a cave." Collins agreed to join her in the studio after hearing her voice. He said, "[She] achieved an incredible amount. I really love her voice. I love some of this stuff she's done, too." In September 2014, Collins revealed that the collaboration had ended and he said it had been "a bit of a non-starter". In May 2014, Collins gave a live performance of "In the Air Tonight" and "Land of Confusion" with young student musicians at the Miami Country Day School in Miami, Florida. Collins was asked to perform there by his sons, who were students at the school. In August 2014, Collins was reported to have accepted an invitation to perform in December at a benefit concert in Miami in aid of his Little Dreams Foundation charity. He ultimately missed the concert due to illness.

=== 2015–present: Out of retirement, Not Dead Yet Tour and second Genesis reunion ===
In May 2015, Collins signed a deal with Warner Music Group to have his solo albums remastered and reissued with previously unreleased material. In October of that year, he announced that he was no longer retired and had started plans to tour and make a new album. By mid-2016, all eight of his albums were reissued with the artwork updated to display Collins as his older self; the exception being Going Back, which had a new cover. In 2019, the additional digital only releases Other Sides and Remixed Sides followed.

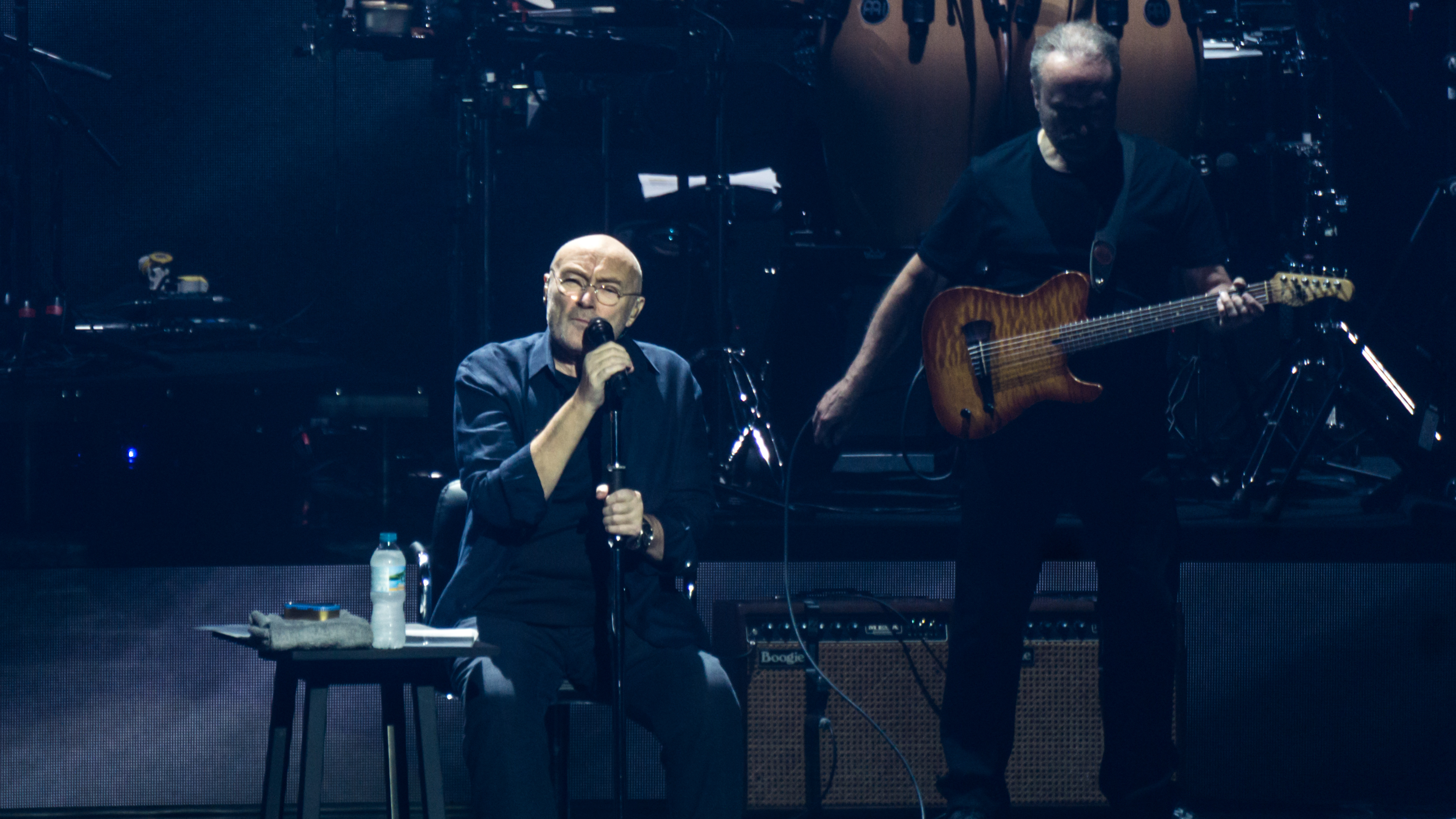
Collins performing on stage at the Royal Albert Hall, London on 7 June 2017

In October 2016, Collins's autobiography Not Dead Yet was published. At a press conference held at the Royal Albert Hall in London in the same month, Collins announced his Not Dead Yet Tour which initially took form as a short European trek from June 2017. The tour included five nights at the Royal Albert Hall which sold out in fifteen seconds, prompting the announcement of Collins's headline spot at the 2017 BST Hyde Park festival which became his largest solo concert. His band included his son Nicolas on the drums. A review in The Telegraph stated: "Unlike the body, the voice is largely unravaged by time. It's still soulful, sometimes silky, occasionally bruised." In 2017, the tour was extended worldwide and ran until October 2019 for a total of 97 shows.

In March 2020, Collins, Banks, and Rutherford announced they had reformed Genesis once more to undertake The Last Domino? Tour. This time the band were joined by Collins's son Nic on the drums, leaving his father to handle lead vocals. After the tour was rescheduled twice due to the COVID-19 pandemic, it began in September 2021 and finished in London on 26 March 2022. At the last show, at The O2 Arena in London, Collins said on stage: "It's the last show for Genesis".

On 20 August 2024, music executive Simon Napier-Bell said that Collins was updating his home studio by Lake Geneva, with new music possibly in the works. In February 2025, Collins said he had no plans to make more music and was "not hungry" enough to do so due to his ongoing health issues. In July 2025, rumours circulated that the musician was in hospice, but Collins's spokesperson dismissed the claims. The spokesperson told People that while Collins was indeed hospitalised, it was for knee surgery, not a terminal illness. In an interview with the BBC's Zoe Ball in January 2026, Collins said that he had endured several painful knee surgeries, but that his physical condition was much improved and he was considering making new music.

In 2026, Collins was elected to the Rock and Roll Hall of Fame as a solo artist. Travis Barker inducted him at the ceremony held on 14 November. He was previously inducted in 2010 as a member of Genesis.

== Drumming and influence ==
In his book on the "legends" who defined progressive rock drumming, American drummer Rich Lackowski wrote: "Phil Collins's grooves in early Genesis recordings paved the way for many talented drummers to come. His ability to make the drums bark with musicality and to communicate so convincingly in odd time signatures left many a drummer tossing on the headphones and playing along to Phil's lead." In 2014, readers of Rhythm voted Collins the fourth most influential progressive rock drummer for his work on the 1974 Genesis album The Lamb Lies Down on Broadway. In 2015, MusicRadar named Collins one of the six pioneers of progressive rock drumming. In 2005, Planet Rock listeners voted Collins the fifth greatest rock drummer in history. Collins was ranked tenth in "The Greatest Drummers of All Time" list by Gigwise and number nine in a list of "The 20 greatest drummers of the last 25 years" by MusicRadar in 2010. In 1987, Collins said of his fast playing in Brand X and early Genesis: "I actually can't play like that anymore". Collins was ranked by Rolling Stone at 43 in its list of the 100 Greatest Drummers of All Time.

Foo Fighters drummer Taylor Hawkins cited Collins as one of his drumming heroes. He said, "Collins is an incredible drummer. Anyone who wants to be good on the drums should check him out – the man is a master." In the April 2001 issue of Modern Drummer, Dream Theater drummer Mike Portnoy named Collins in an interview when asked about drummers he was influenced by and had respect for. In another conversation in 2014, Portnoy lauded his "amazing progressive drumming" back in the early and mid-1970s. Rush drummer Neil Peart praised his "beautiful drumming" and "lovely sound" on the 1973 Genesis album Selling England by the Pound, which he called "an enduring masterpiece of drumming". Marco Minnemann, drummer for artists including Joe Satriani and Steven Wilson, described Collins as "brilliant" for the way "he composes his parts, and the sounds he gets". He said, "Phil is almost like John Bonham to me. I hear his personality, his perspective." He singled out the drumming on "In the Air Tonight" as an example of "ten notes that everybody knows" and concluded "Phil is [an] insanely talented drummer."

Other drummers who have cited him as an influence or expressed admiration for his drumming work are Brann Dailor of Mastodon, Nick D'Virgilio of Spock's Beard and Big Big Train, Jimmy Keegan of Spock's Beard, Matt Mingus of Dance Gavin Dance, John Merryman of Cephalic Carnage, Craig Blundell of Steven Wilson and Frost*, and Charlie Benante of Anthrax. According to Jason Bonham, his father "respected Phil Collins' drumming very much" and one of his favourite songs was Genesis's "Turn It On Again", which he used to love playing with him.

Modern Drummer readers voted for Collins every year between 1987 and 1991 as Pop/Mainstream Rock drummer of the year. In 2000, he was voted as Big Band drummer of the year. In 2012, he was inducted into the Hall of Fame.

In addition to his earliest influences such as Buddy Rich and Ringo Starr, Collins has cited Billy Cobham, Charlie Watts, Keith Moon, John Bonham, Tony Williams, Airto Moirea, Roger Powell, Ginger Baker, Sonny Payne, and Elvin Jones as drumming influences.

=== Equipment ===
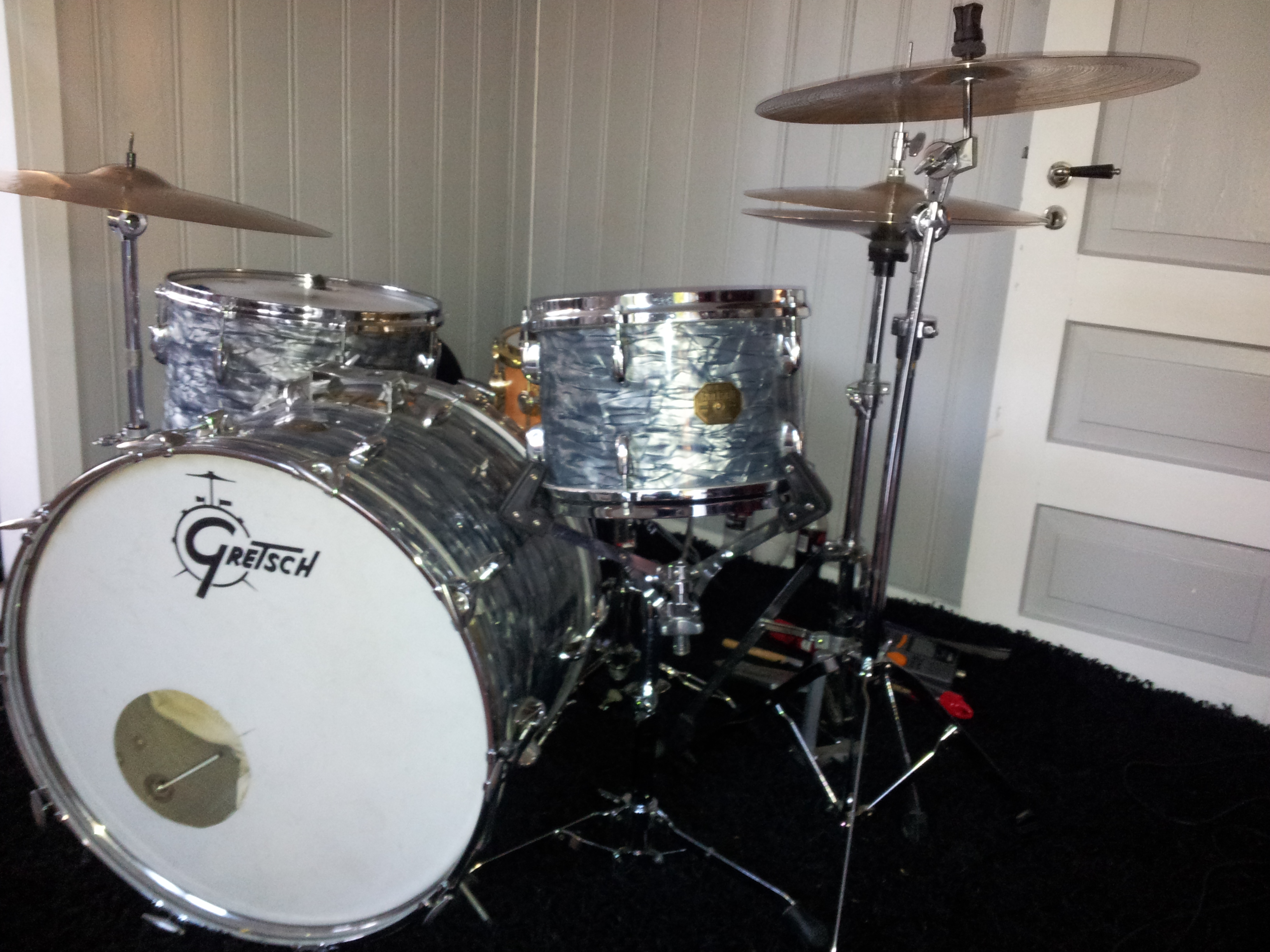
Collins used Gretsch Drums from 1983 onward.

A left-handed drummer, Collins used Gretsch Drums, Noble & Cooley solid snare drums, Remo heads, Sabian cymbals and his signature Promark sticks. Past kits he used were made by Pearl and Premier.

Other instruments associated with Collins's sound (particularly in his post-1978 Genesis and solo career) include the Roland TR-808 and Roland TR-909 drum machines, the Simmons SDSV electronic drum set, and the LinnDrum drum machine. Collins also used a Roland CR-78 drum machine, Sequential Circuits Prophet-5 synthesizer, the Fender Rhodes and Yamaha CP-70 electric pianos, and a vocoder for his voice on "In the Air Tonight". He used electronic instruments by Korg including the Wavestation, the Karma and the Trinity.

== Cameo film and television appearances ==
Collins had cameo appearances in Steven Spielberg's Hook (1991) and the AIDS docudrama And the Band Played On (1993). He starred in Frauds, which competed for the Palme d'Or at the 1993 Cannes Film Festival. He supplied voices to two animated features: Amblin's Balto (1995) and Disney's The Jungle Book 2 (2003). A long-discussed but never completed project was a film titled The Three Bears; originally meant to star Collins, Danny DeVito, and Bob Hoskins. He often mentioned the film, though an appropriate script never materialised. Collins's music is featured in the black comedy horror film American Psycho, with psychotic lead character Patrick Bateman (played by Christian Bale) portrayed as an obsessive fan who reads deep meaning into his work, especially with Genesis, while describing his solo music as "...more commercial and therefore more satisfying, in a narrower way." Bateman delivers a monologue praising Collins and Genesis during a sequence in which he engages the services of two prostitutes while playing "In Too Deep" and "Sussudio". Collins told the New Musical Express: "I don't think him being a psychopath and liking my music is linked – my music was just omnipresent in that era."

During the 1980s, Collins was among the celebrities caricatured on the ITV satirical television puppet show Spitting Image—the show's creators were then commissioned by Genesis to create puppets of the entire band to appear in their 1986 music video "Land of Confusion". Collins twice hosted the Billboard Music Awards on television, which were produced and directed by his longtime music video and TV special collaborators, Paul Flattery and Jim Yukich of FYI (Flattery Yukich Inc). In 1985, he also appeared in an episode of the series Miami Vice, entitled "Phil the Shill", in which he plays a cheating con-man. In the 1980s, he appeared in several comedy sketches with The Two Ronnies on BBC One.

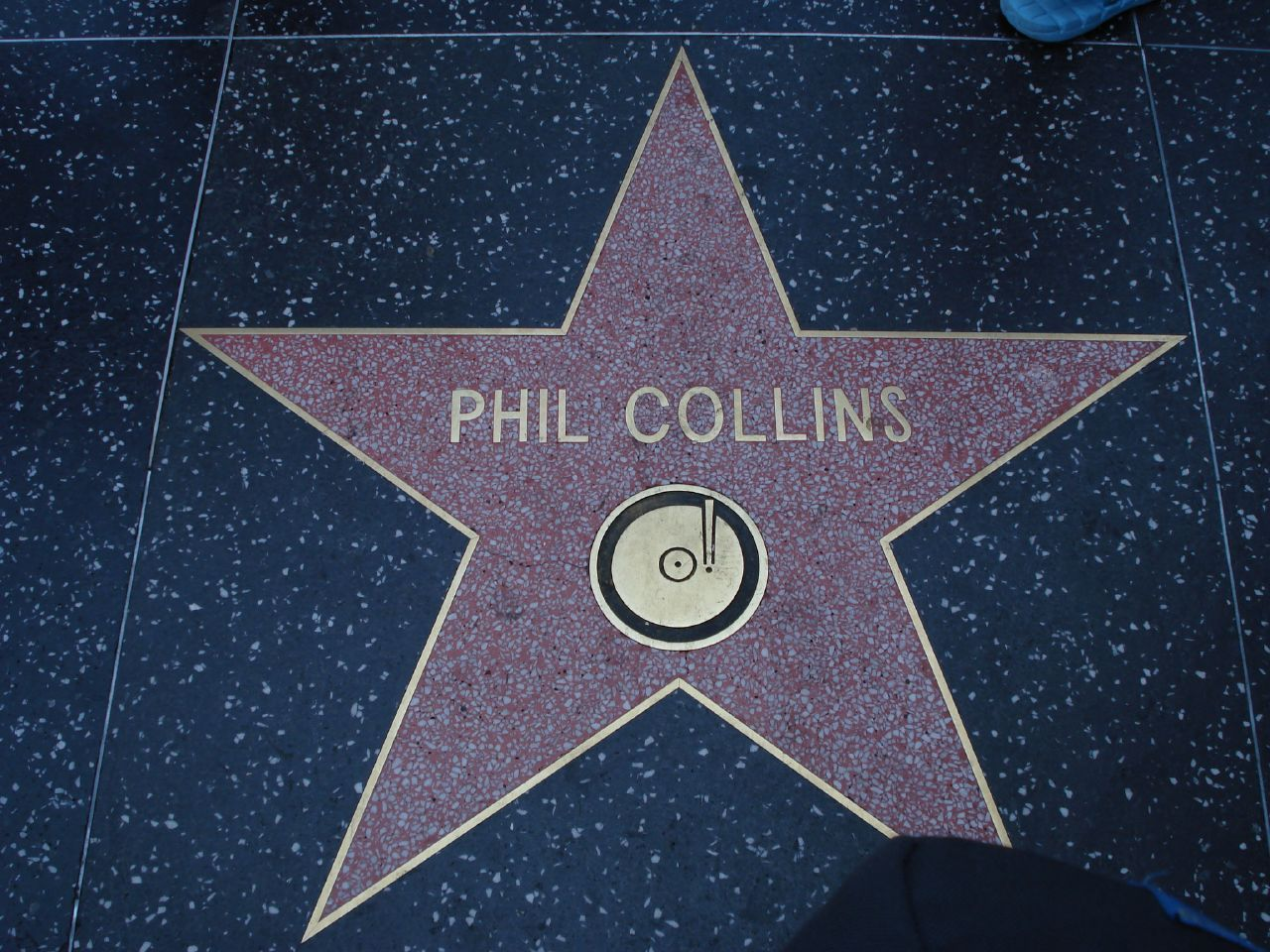
Collins's star on the Hollywood Walk of Fame was awarded to the musician for his contribution to recording. It is located at 6834 Hollywood Boulevard.

In 2001, Collins was one of several celebrities who were tricked into appearing in a controversial British comedy series, Brass Eye, shown on public service broadcaster Channel 4. In the episode, Collins endorsed a hoax anti-paedophile campaign wearing a T-shirt with the words "Nonce Sense" and warned children against speaking to suspicious people. Collins was reported by the BBC to have consulted lawyers regarding the programme, which was originally pulled from broadcast but eventually rescheduled. Collins said he had taken part in the programme "in good faith for the public benefit", believing it to be "a public service programme that would be going around schools and colleges in a bid to stem child abduction and abuse". Collins also accused the makers of the programme of "some serious taste problems" and warned it would prevent celebrities from supporting "public spirited causes" in the future.

In 2006, Collins played a fictional version of himself in the PSP and PS2 video game Grand Theft Auto: Vice City Stories. Set in 1984, he appears in three missions in which the main character, Victor Vance, must save him from Mafia-hired hitmen, who are trying to kill Collins because his manager refused to pay his $3 million debt to them. The final mission occurs during his concert, where the player must defend the scaffolding against saboteurs while Collins is performing "In the Air Tonight". After this, the player is given the opportunity to watch this performance of "In the Air Tonight" for the cost of 6,000 in-game dollars. "In the Air Tonight" is part of the official Vice City Stories soundtrack, and can be also heard on the in-game radio station Emotion 98.3. Collins solo music & songs he made with Genesis have also been featured in Grand Theft Auto IV, V & VI. "In the Air Tonight" has also been featured in films such as Aqua Teen Hunger Force Colon Movie Film for Theaters (2007) and The Hangover (2009).

"In the Air Tonight" featured in the 2007 Gorilla commercial for Cadbury's Dairy Milk chocolate. Many believed that Collins himself was the drummer. When asked about Gorilla, Collins jokingly commented that "Not only is he a better drummer than me, he also has more hair. Can he sing too?" The advertisement—which won Gold at the British Television Advertising Awards in 2008—helped the song re-enter the New Zealand RIANZ Singles Chart at No. 3 in July 2008, the following week reaching No. 1, beating its original 1981 No. 6 peak. "In the Air Tonight" was also sampled in the song "I Can Feel It" on Sean Kingston's self-titled debut album.

Collins was portrayed in the cartoon South Park in the episode "Timmy 2000" holding his Oscar throughout, referring to his 1999 win for "You'll Be in My Heart", which defeated "Blame Canada" from South Park: Bigger, Longer & Uncut. The show's creators admitted resenting losing to Collins, as they felt their other competitors were more worthy. The episode "Cartman's Silly Hate Crime 2000" involves a sled race down the landmark known as Phil Collins Hill, which has an impression of Collins's face in the side. The Phil Collins character returns once more and gets killed off in the episode 200. Collins appears briefly in the Finnish animated sitcom Pasila in the episode "Phil Collins Hangover". The music of this episode is a pastiche of Collins's "Another Day in Paradise". Collins was mentioned in the Psych episode "Disco Didn't Die. It Was Murdered!" as resembling Shawn Spencer's father, Henry, portrayed by actor Corbin Bernsen.

== Personal life ==
=== Family and relationships ===
Collins has been married three times. From 1975 to 1980, he was married to Canadian-born Andrea Bertorelli. They met as 11-year-old students in a London drama class and reconnected in 1974 when Genesis performed in Vancouver. They married in England in 1975 when both were 24, after which Collins legally adopted Bertorelli's daughter Joely (b. 1972), who became an actress and film producer. They also had a son, Simon Collins (b. 1976), who is the former vocalist and drummer of the progressive rock band Sound of Contact. In 2016, Bertorelli took legal action against Collins pertaining to his account of their relationship in his autobiography.

In 1984, Collins married American Jill Tavelman. They have one daughter, Lily Collins (b. 1989), who became an actress. While married to Tavelman, Collins twice had an affair with Lavinia Lang while touring with Genesis in 1992. Lang was a former drama school classmate with whom Collins had been engaged. In 1994, Collins stated that he had filed for divorce from Tavelman, which was finalised in 1996. As part of the settlement, Collins paid her £17 million.

In 1999, Collins married Orianne Cevey, a Swiss national who worked as his translator at the start of his 1994 tour when she was 22 and he was 43. They have two sons, Nicholas and Mathew. Nicholas is a professional drummer, while Mathew was an aspiring footballer for the youth squad of WSG Tirol, having previously played in the youth systems of Bundesliga club Hannover 96 and Astoria Walldorf. He has since gone on to play in the WSG Tirol's regional leagues. The family lived in the former house of Jackie Stewart in Begnins, Switzerland. In 2006, Cevey and Collins divorced. Collins paid £25 million to Cevey, which became the largest settlement in a British celebrity divorce. Collins continued to live in Féchy, Switzerland, while he also maintained homes in New York City and Dersingham, Norfolk.

From 2007 to 2016, Collins was in a relationship with American news anchor Dana Tyler. In 2008, Cevey and her two sons moved to Miami, Florida. Collins recalled: "I went through a few bits of darkness; drinking too much. I killed my hours watching TV and drinking, and it almost killed me." He said in 2015 that he had been teetotal for three years. In January 2016, after moving to Miami Beach, Florida in the previous year to be closer to his two youngest sons, Collins reunited with Cevey and they lived together in Miami. In October 2020, Collins filed an eviction notice against Cevey after she secretly married another man in August of that year. Collins sold his Miami home in 2021 for $39 million.

In 2016, Collins stated that he regretted cheating on his second wife, and said that his three divorces indicated a "failure to co-exist happily and to understand my partners."

Collins's brother Clive was a cartoonist. Phil appeared at his brother's investiture ceremony at Buckingham Palace in 2012 when he was awarded an MBE for services to art, with Phil stating, "I shared a bedroom with him when we were boys and he was always drawing. He used to do Christmas cards and birthday cards for the family." Clive died in 2022 at the age of 80.

=== Wealth ===
In 2012, Collins was estimated to be the second-wealthiest drummer in the world, surpassed only by Ringo Starr. Collins was estimated to have a fortune of £145 million in the Sunday Times Rich List of 2021, making him one of the 25 wealthiest people in the British music industry.

=== Court case ===
On 29 March 2000, Collins launched a case against two former musicians from his band to recoup £500,000 in royalties that were overpaid. Louis Satterfield and Rahmlee Davis claimed their contract entitled them to 0.5 per cent of the royalties from Serious Hits... Live!, a live album recorded during Collins's Seriously, Live! World Tour in 1990. They claimed they were an integral part of the whole album, but Collins responded that the two should only receive royalties from the five tracks in which they were involved. On 19 April 2000, the High Court in London ruled that the two musicians would receive no more royalty money from Phil Collins. The amount that Collins was seeking was halved, and Satterfield and Davis (who originally brought the suit forward in California) would not have to repay any of it. The judge agreed with Collins's argument that Satterfield and Davis should have been paid for only the five tracks on which they performed, including the hit "Sussudio".

=== Health ===
In 2000, Collins developed sudden hearing loss in his left ear following a recording session in Los Angeles. He consulted three doctors, who reportedly told him that there was nothing they could do and that the chance of a full recovery was slim. Two years later, he had recovered most of his hearing. Collins later found that it was caused by a viral infection, and it was resolved after treatment.

Collins, on stage at the Royal Albert Hall in 2017, has had to sit while performing since that year.

In April 2009, Collins had surgery on his upper neck to correct a problem that began while drumming on the 2007 Genesis tour. Following the surgery, he lost feeling in his fingers and could grip drumsticks only if they were taped to his hands. In 2010, Collins alluded to feelings of depression and low self-worth in recent years and said he had contemplated suicide, but he resisted for the sake of his children. In 2014, Collins said that he was still unable to play the drums and that it was not arthritis, but an undiagnosed nerve problem. In 2015, he underwent spine surgery. In 2016, he said he was still unable to drum with his left hand. His doctor advised him that if he wanted to play the drums again, he would need to "take it step by step" and "practice".

In his 2016 autobiography, Collins acknowledged that he had struggled with alcoholism following his retirement and third divorce. He wrote that he had been sober for three years. In January 2017, Collins said he was a type 2 diabetic and had received treatment with a hyperbaric chamber after developing a diabetic abscess on his foot that became infected. That June, Collins cancelled two shows after he slipped in his hotel room and hit his head, resulting in stitches. The fall was caused by his foot drop, resulting from his back surgery. He had to use a cane to walk and sit while performing on stage.

Collins began drinking again when he stopped using the drug Antabuse, which causes sickness if alcohol is consumed. In November 2023, he was hospitalised for seven months with severe damage to his kidneys and pancreas caused by drinking. In January 2026, Collins said he had around-the-clock live-in nurse care. In August, Collins said he had been sober for three years.

=== Honorary degrees ===
Collins has received several honorary degrees in recognition of his work in music and his personal interests. In 1987, he received an honorary doctorate of fine arts at Fairleigh Dickinson University. In 1991, he received an honorary doctorate of music at the Berklee College of Music. On 12 May 2012, he received an honorary doctorate of history at the McMurry University in Abilene, Texas, for his research and collection of Texas Revolution artefacts and documents (see other interests section).

=== Political views ===
Collins is often erroneously described in the British media as a supporter of the Conservative Party and a critic of the Labour Party. This derives from an article in The Sun printed on the day of the 1992 UK general election titled "If Kinnock wins today will the last person to leave Britain please turn out the lights", which stated that Collins was among several celebrities who were planning to leave Britain in the event of a Labour victory.

It has been alleged in the British press that Collins left the UK and moved to Switzerland in protest at the Labour Party's victory in the 1997 general election. Shortly before the 2005 election, when Collins was living in Switzerland, the musician and Labour supporter Noel Gallagher was quoted: "Vote Labour. If you don't and the Tories get in, Phil Collins is threatening to come back and live here. And let's face it, none of us want that." Collins stated that although he did once say many years earlier that he might leave Britain if most of his income was taken in tax, which was Labour Party policy at that time for top earners, he had never been a Conservative Party supporter and he left Britain for Switzerland in 1994 because he started a relationship with a woman who lived there. He said of Gallagher: "I don't care if he likes my music or not. I do care if he starts telling people I'm a wanker because of my politics. It's an opinion based on an old, misunderstood quote."

Despite his statement that he did not leave Britain for tax purposes, Collins was one of several wealthy figures living in tax havens who were singled out for criticism in a 2008 report by the charity Christian Aid. The Independent included Collins as one of their "ten celebrity tax exiles", erroneously repeating that he had left the country when Labour won the 1997 general election and that he threatened to return if the Conservatives won in 2005. Referring to the 1997 general election in his article "Famous men and their misunderstood politics" for MSN, Hugh Wilson stated: "Labour won it in a landslide, which just goes to show the influence pop stars really wield." He also wrote that Collins's reported comments and subsequent move to Switzerland led to "accusations of hypocrisy" since he had "bemoaned the plight of the homeless" in his song "Another Day in Paradise", making him "an easy target when future elections came round". The Paul Heaton and Jacqui Abbott song "When I Get Back to Blighty", from their 2014 album What Have We Become?, made reference to Collins as "a prisoner to his tax returns".

Questioned about his political views by Mark Lawson in a 2009 interview for the BBC, Collins said: "My father was Conservative but it wasn't quite the same, I don't think, when he was alive. Politics never loomed large in our family anyway. I think the politics of the country were very different then." In a 2016 interview in The Guardian, Collins stated that talking about politics to The Sun was one of his biggest regrets. When asked whether he had ever voted Conservative, he said: "I didn't vote, actually. And that's not something I'm proud of. I was just so busy that I rarely was here."

Collins is a member of the Canadian charity Artists Against Racism and has worked with them on campaigns including radio PSAs. In October 2020, Collins issued a cease and desist order to Donald Trump and his campaign for playing "In the Air Tonight" at a rally.

=== Other interests ===
Collins has a long-standing interest in the Alamo. He has collected hundreds of artefacts related to the 1836 battle in San Antonio, Texas, narrated a light and sound show about the Alamo, and has spoken at related events. In 2012, he published a book, The Alamo and Beyond: A Collector's Journey. On 26 June 2014, at a press conference held from the Alamo, Collins announced that he was donating his collection to the Alamo via the State of Texas. On 11 March 2015, in honour of his donation, Collins was named an honorary Texan by the state legislature.

Like Rod Stewart, Eric Clapton, and Neil Young, Collins is a model railway enthusiast. He also has an interest in King & Country toy soldiers. He is an honorary president of Richmond Yacht Club based in Eel Pie Island in the River Thames at Twickenham in the London Borough of Richmond upon Thames, of which his parents used to be members.

== Charity work ==
Collins has performed at the Secret Policeman's Ball, a benefit show co-founded by Monty Python member John Cleese on behalf of Amnesty International. He made his first appearance at the 1981 show held in London's Theatre Royal, Drury Lane, and he subsequently became an activist. Collins was appointed a Lieutenant of the Royal Victorian Order (LVO) in the 1994 Birthday Honours, in recognition of his work on behalf of the Prince's Trust, a leading UK youth charity founded by King Charles III (then-Prince of Wales) which provides training, personal development, business start up support, mentoring, and advice. Since appearing at the first Prince's Trust's rock concert in 1982, which included a performance as part of singer Kate Bush's backing band, Collins has played at the event numerous times, most recently at the Royal Albert Hall in 2010.

On 9 April 1989, Collins topped the bill at a benefit concert for the English comic actor Terry-Thomas at the Theatre Royal, Drury Lane, which raised over £75,000 for Terry-Thomas and Parkinson's UK. Collins supports animal rights and People for the Ethical Treatment of Animals (PETA). In 2005, he donated autographed drumsticks in support of PETA's campaign against Kentucky Fried Chicken.

In February 2000, Collins and Cevey launched the Little Dreams Foundation, a non-profit organisation that aims to "...realise the dreams of children in the fields of sports and art" by providing future prodigies aged 4 to 16 years with financial, material, and mentoring support with the help of experts in various fields. Collins took the action after receiving letters from children asking him how they could break into the music industry. Mentors to the students who have benefited from his foundation include Tina Turner and Natalie Cole. In 2013 he visited Miami Beach, Florida, to promote the expansion of his foundation.

Collins supports the South African charity Topsy Foundation, which provides relief services to some of South Africa's most under-resourced rural communities through a multi-faceted approach to the consequences of HIV/AIDS and extreme poverty. He donates all the royalties earned from his music sales in South Africa to the organisation.

== Reputation and legacy ==
According to a 2000 BBC News biography of Collins, "critics sneer at him" and "bad publicity also caused problems", which "damaged his public profile". Rock historian Martin C. Strong wrote that Collins "truly polarised opinion from the start, his ubiquitous smugness and increasingly sterile pop making him a favourite target for critics". According to Guardian writer Paul Lester, Collins would "regularly" call music journalists to take issue with negative reviews. Over time, he came to be personally disliked; in 2009, journalist Mark Lawson told how Collins's media profile had shifted from "pop's Mr. Nice guy, patron saint of ordinary blokes", to someone accused of "blandness, [being a] tax exile and ending a marriage by sending a fax". Collins has rejected accusations of tax avoidance, and despite confirming that some of the divorce-related correspondence between him and second wife, Jill Tavelman, was by fax (a message from Collins regarding access to their daughter was reproduced for the front cover of The Sun in 1994), he states that he did not terminate the marriage in that fashion. Nevertheless, the British media has often repeated the fax claim. Caroline Sullivan, a music critic of The Guardian, referred to his cumulative negative publicity in her 2007 article "I wish I'd never heard of Phil Collins", writing that it was difficult for her to hear his work "without being riven by distaste for the man himself".

Several critics have commented on Collins's omnipresence, especially in the 1980s and early 1990s. Journalist Frank DiGiacomo wrote a 1999 piece for The New York Observer titled The Collins Menace; he said, "Even when I sought to escape the sounds [of Collins] in my head by turning on the TV, there would be Mr. Collins... mugging for the cameras—intent on showing the world just how hard he would work to sell millions of records to millions of stupid people." In his 2010 article "Love Don't Come Easy: Artists We Love to Hate", The Irish Times critic Kevin Courtney expressed similar sentiments. Naming Collins as one of the ten most disliked pop stars in the world, he wrote: "[Collins] performed at Live Aid, playing first at Wembley, then flying over to Philadelphia via Concorde, just to make sure no one in the U.S. got off lightly. By the early 1990s, Phil phatigue [sic] had really set in." Tim Chester of the New Musical Express alluded to the backlash against Collins in an article titled, "Is It Time We All Stopped Hating Phil Collins?". Chester said of the unrelenting derision he has suffered, "a lot of it he brings on himself." He also said that Collins was "responsible for some of the cheesiest music ever committed to acetate". Erik Hedegaard of Rolling Stone mentioned that Phil Collins hate sites had "flourished" online, and acknowledged that he had been called "the sellout who took Peter Gabriel's Genesis, that paragon of prog-rock, and turned it into a lame-o pop act and went on to make all those supercheesy hits that really did define the 1980s".

According to author Dylan Jones in his 2013 publication on 1980s popular music, many of Collins's peers "despised" him. Some fellow artists have made negative comments about Collins publicly. In 1990, former Pink Floyd frontman Roger Waters criticised Collins's "ubiquitous nature", including his involvement in the Who's 1989 reunion tour. David Bowie dismissed some of his own 1980s output as his "Phil Collins years/albums". In addition to the song's negative press from music journalists, singer-songwriter and political activist Billy Bragg criticised Collins for writing "Another Day in Paradise", stating: "Phil Collins might write a song about the homeless, but if he doesn't have the action to go with it he's just exploiting that for a subject." Oasis songwriter Noel Gallagher criticised Collins on multiple occasions, including the comment: "Just because you sell lots of records, it doesn't mean to say you're any good. Look at Phil Collins." Collins said he has "at times, been very down" about Noel Gallagher's comments. Gallagher's brother, Oasis singer Liam, also recalled the "boring" Collins's chart dominance in the 1980s and stated that, by the 1990s, it was "time for some real lads to get up there and take charge". Appearing on the BBC television series Room 101 in 2005, in which guests discuss their most hated things and people, Collins nominated the Gallaghers to be sent into the eponymous room. He described them as "horrible" and stated: "They're rude and not as talented as they think they are. I won't mince words here, but they've had a go at me personally."

Collins acknowledged in 2010 that he had been "omnipresent". He said of his character: "The persona on stage came out of insecurity... it seems embarrassing now. I recently started transferring all my VHS tapes onto DVD to create an archive, and everything I was watching, I thought, 'God, I'm annoying.' I appeared to be very cocky, and really I wasn't." Collins concedes his status as a figure of contempt for many people and has said that he believes this is a consequence of his music being overplayed. In 2011, he said: "The fact that people got so sick of me wasn't really my fault. ... It's hardly surprising that people grew to hate me. I'm sorry that it was all so successful. I honestly didn't mean it to happen like that!" He described criticism of his physical appearance over the years as "a cheap shot", but has acknowledged the "very vocal element" of Genesis fans who believe that the group sold out under his tenure as lead vocalist. Collins denied that his retirement in 2011 was due to negative attention and said that his statements had been taken out of context. He said: "I have ended up sounding like a tormented weirdo who thinks he was at the Alamo in another life, who feels very sorry for himself, and is retiring hurt because of the bad press over the years. None of this is true."

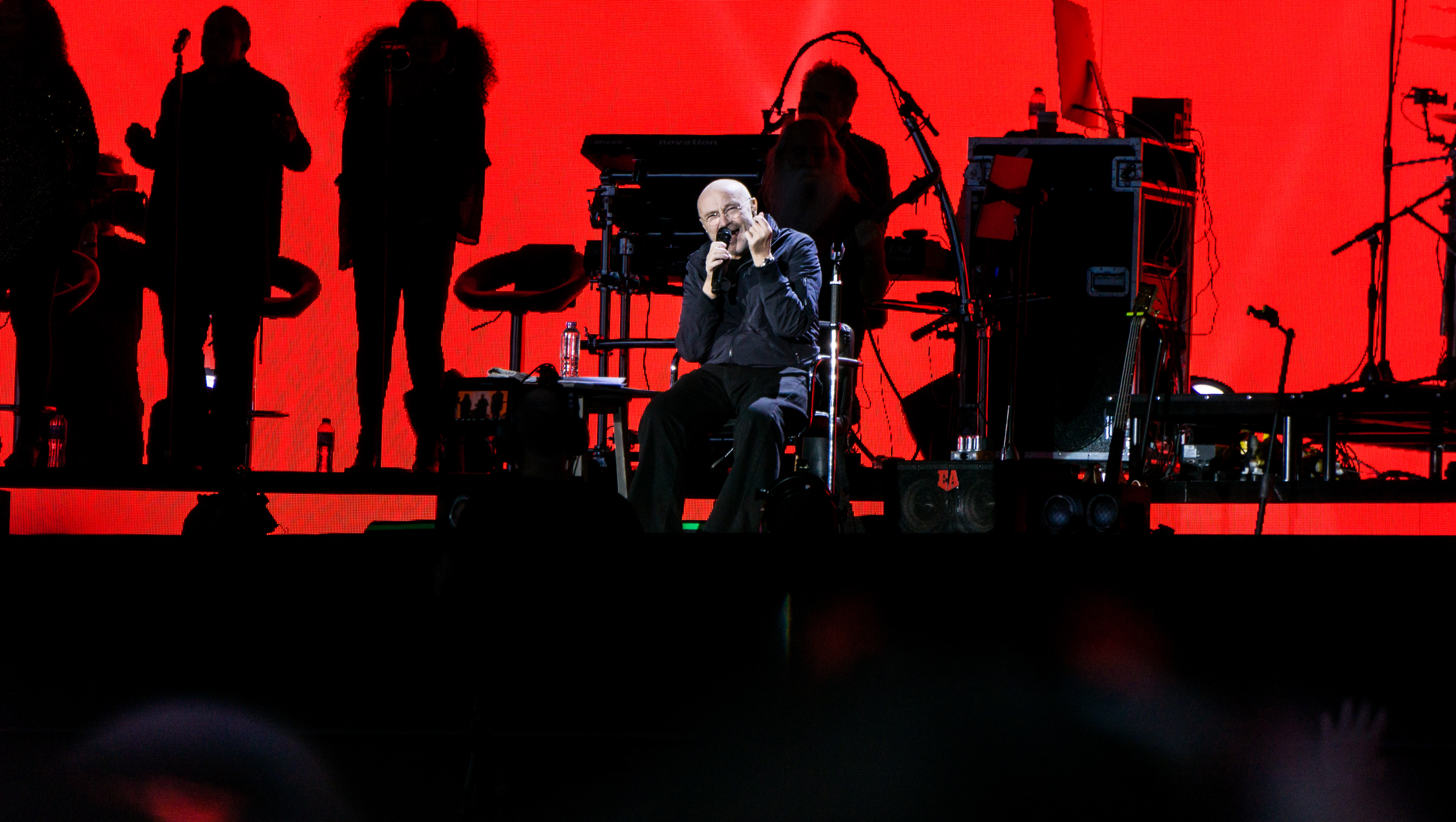
Collins performing to 65,000 at Hyde Park, London on 30 June 2017. Music critic Neil McCormick wrote, "He could barely walk but Phil Collins still knocked it out of Hyde Park".

Paul Lester of The Guardian wrote in 2013 that Collins is one of several pop acts that "used to be a joke" but are "now being hailed as gods". Collins has become an important figure in US urban music, influencing artists such as Kanye West, Alicia Keys and Beyoncé. His songs have been sampled by various hip-hop and contemporary R&B acts, and performers including Lil' Kim, Kelis, and Wu-Tang Clan co-founder Ol' Dirty Bastard covered his work on the 2001 tribute album Urban Renewal.

In 2004, Death Cab for Cutie and the Postal Service musician Ben Gibbard described Collins as a "great vocalist". Collins was championed by his contemporary, the heavy metal singer Ozzy Osbourne, David Crosby called him "a dear friend" who helped him "enormously", Queen guitarist Brian May called him "a great guy and an amazing drummer", and Robert Plant paid tribute to him as "the most spirited and positive and really encouraging force" when commencing his own solo career after the break-up of Led Zeppelin. Collins has been championed by modern artists in diverse genres, including indie rock groups the 1975, Generationals, Unquiet Nights, Neon Indian, Yeasayer, St. Lucia and Sleigh Bells, electronica artist Lorde, and soul singer Diane Birch, who said in 2014, "Collins walks a really fine line between being really cheesy and being really sophisticated. He can seem appalling, but at the same time, he has awesome production values and there's a particular richness to the sound. It's very proficient in the instrumentation and savvy about melodies."

Genesis bandmate Mike Rutherford has praised Collins's personality, saying that "he always had a bloke-next-door, happy-go-lucky demeanour about him: let's have a drink in the pub, crack a joke, smoke a cigarette or a joint". In 2014, former Genesis frontman Peter Gabriel, who worked again with Collins in the 1980s, referred to him as the "workaholics' workaholic". He has been characterised by favourable critics as a "rock god", and an artist who has remained "down to earth". In The New Rolling Stone Album Guide, published in 2004, J. D. Considine wrote: "For a time, Phil Collins was nearly inescapable on the radio, and enormously popular with the listening public — something that made him an obvious target for critics. Despite his lumpen-pop appeal, however, Collins is an incisive songwriter and resourceful musician."

Tim Chester of the New Musical Express described Collins as "the go-to guy for ironic appreciation and guilty pleasures" and stated he was responsible for "some moments of true genius (often accompanied, it must be said, by some real stinkers)". Creation Records founder Alan McGee wrote in 2009 that there was a "non-ironic revival of Phil Collins" happening. According to McGee: "The kids don't care about 'indie cred' anymore. To them, a great pop song is just that: a great pop song. In this time of revivals, nothing is a sacred cow anymore, and that can only be a good thing for music." Commenting on Collins's popularity with hip-hop acts, he argued: "It's not surprising. Collins is a world-class drummer whose songs immediately lend themselves to being sampled."

In 2010, Gary Mills of The Quietus made an impassioned defence of Collins: "There can't be many figures in the world of pop who have inspired quite the same kind of hatred-bordering-on-civil-unrest as Collins, and there can't be too many who have shifted anything like the 150 million plus units that he's got through as a solo artist either... The disgrace of a career bogged entirely in the determined dross of No Jacket Required however is simply not justified, regardless of how Collins gained either his fortune, or his public image." David Sheppard wrote for the BBC in 2010: "Granted, Collins has sometimes been guilty of painting the bull's-eye on his own forehead (that self-aggrandising Live Aid Concorde business, the cringe-worthy lyrics to 'Another Day in Paradise', Buster, etc.), but nonetheless, the sometime Genesis frontman's canon is so substantial and his hits so profuse that it feels myopic to dismiss him merely as a haughty purveyor of tortured, romantic ballads for the middle income world."

Rolling Stone journalist Erik Hedegaard expressed disapproval of the widespread criticism which Collins has received, suggesting that he has been "unfairly and inexplicably vilified". Martin C. Strong stated in 2011 that "the enigmatic and amiable Phil Collins has had his fair share of mockers and critics over the years, although one thing is sure, and that is his dexterity and undeniable talent". In a piece the following year, titled "10 Much-Mocked Artists It's Time We Forgave", New Musical Express critic Anna Conrad said Collins had been portrayed as a "villain", and wrote: "Was the bile really justified?... come on, admit it. You've air drummed to 'In the Air Tonight', and loved it." The Guardian journalist Dave Simpson wrote a complimentary article in 2013; while acknowledging "few pop figures have become as successful and yet reviled as Phil Collins", he argued "it's about time we recognised Collins's vast influence as one of the godfathers of popular culture".

== Discography ==
Studio albums

- Face Value (1981)
- Hello, I Must Be Going! (1982)
- No Jacket Required (1985)
- ...But Seriously (1989)
- Both Sides (1993)
- Dance into the Light (1996)
- Testify (2002)
- Going Back (2010)

== Concert tours ==
- The Hello, I Must Be Going Tour (1982–1983)
- The No Jacket Required World Tour (1985)
- Seriously, Live! World Tour (1990)
- Both Sides of the World Tour (1994–1995)
- Trip into the Light World Tour (1997)
- The First Final Farewell Tour (2004–2005)
- Not Dead Yet Tour (2017–2019)

== Filmography ==
=== Film ===
Year	Title	Role	Notes
1964	A Hard Day's Night	Seated Fan with Necktie	
1967	Calamity the Cow	Mike Lucas	
1968	Chitty Chitty Bang Bang	Vulgarian Child	
1970	I Start Counting	Ice Cream Vendor	
1988	Buster	Buster Edwards	
1991	Hook	Inspector Good	
1993	Frauds	Roland Copping	
1993	And the Band Played On	Eddie Papasano	TV movie
1995	Balto	Muk / Luk (voice)	
2003	The Jungle Book 2	Lucky (voice)	

=== Television ===
Year	Title	Role	Notes
1965	R3	Terry	Episode: "Unwelcome Visitor"
1966	Thirty-Minute Theatre	Gwyn	Episode: "A Letter from the Country"
1985	Miami Vice	Phil Mayhew	Episode: "Phil the Shill"
1999	Behind the Music	Himself	Episode: "Genesis"
2010	Behind the Music: Remastered	Himself	Episode: "Genesis"

=== Video games ===
Year	Title	Role	Notes
2006	Grand Theft Auto: Vice City Stories	Himself (voice)	

== Books ==
- The Alamo and Beyond: A Collector's Journey (2012)
- Not Dead Yet: The Autobiography (2016)

== See also ==
- List of Academy Award winners and nominees from Great Britain
- List of British Grammy Award winners and nominees
- List of Golden Globe winners
