= For God and Country =

God and Country may refer to:

- God and Country program, former name for the PRAY Program of the Boy Scouts of America
- "God and Country" (Touched by an Angel) episode of season 4 of the series
- God & Country, a 2024 documentary film

For God and Country may refer to:

- For God and Country (James Yee), a 2005 nonfiction book
- For God & Country (Daniel Reyes), a 2009 novel
- For God and Country (Dolly Parton album)
- For God and Country (Good Riddance album)
- "For God and Country" (Homicide: Life on the Street), an episode of Homicide: Life on the Street
- For God and Country (Jan Howard album)
- "For God and Country", a song by the Smashing Pumpkins from Zeitgeist
- Pro Deo et patria, a Latin motto meaning "for God and country"
- For God and Country, the original title for the 2012 movie Zero Dark Thirty
- For God and Country, the original title for the 2017 television series The Brave
- For God and Country, a 2024 song from glaive's album "May It Never Falter"

== See also ==
- For king and country (disambiguation)
- God, king and country
- God's Country (disambiguation)
