= King & Country (company) =

Toy manufacturer based in Hong Kong

King & Country is a Hong Kong company manufacturing toy soldiers and other miniatures founded in the 1980s. The company was founded in 1984 by expatriate Scots Andy Neilson and Laura McAllister; married at the time, they founded four companies together, of which King & Country was the fourth, and continued to work together after divorcing. Both have since remarried. Neilson is the company's creative director. The metal miniatures are manufactured in China and hand painted by two artists, one in Hong Kong and the other on the mainland. The company has a shop in Hong Kong, run by Neilson and originally in Wyndham Street, since 1992 in Pacific Place, and branches in the United Kingdom and the United States.

The first products were miniature Scottish Highlanders and Zulu warriors. In 1995, they added Second World War figurines based on the 1977 film A Bridge Too Far and using matte paint instead of the traditional enamel; in 1998 their sales increased with the release of a range of figures based on and coinciding with Steven Spielberg's film Saving Private Ryan. In addition to metal toy soldiers at 1:30 scale, they now make polyester resin miniatures of buildings and military vehicles, including ships and aircraft, in ranges including Ancient Egypt, the Crusades, the Age of Napoleon, the American Revolutionary War, the Alamo, the American Civil War, The Crimean War, both World Wars (in 2017 they released the first miniatures for the Battle of Hong Kong), and the War in Afghanistan, and also Streets of Old Hong Kong, buildings and figures from colonial Hong Kong.

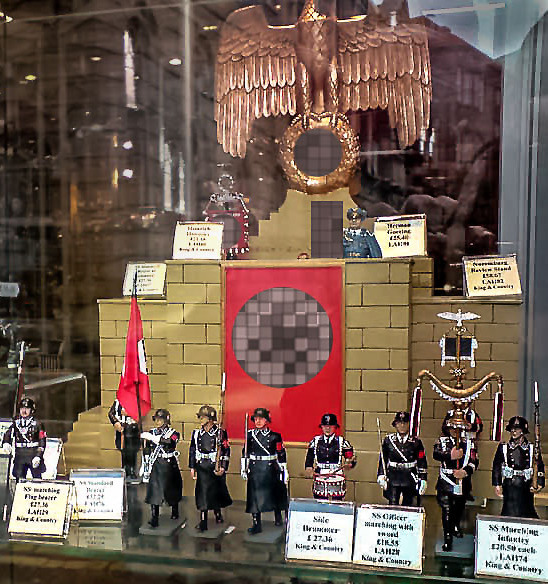

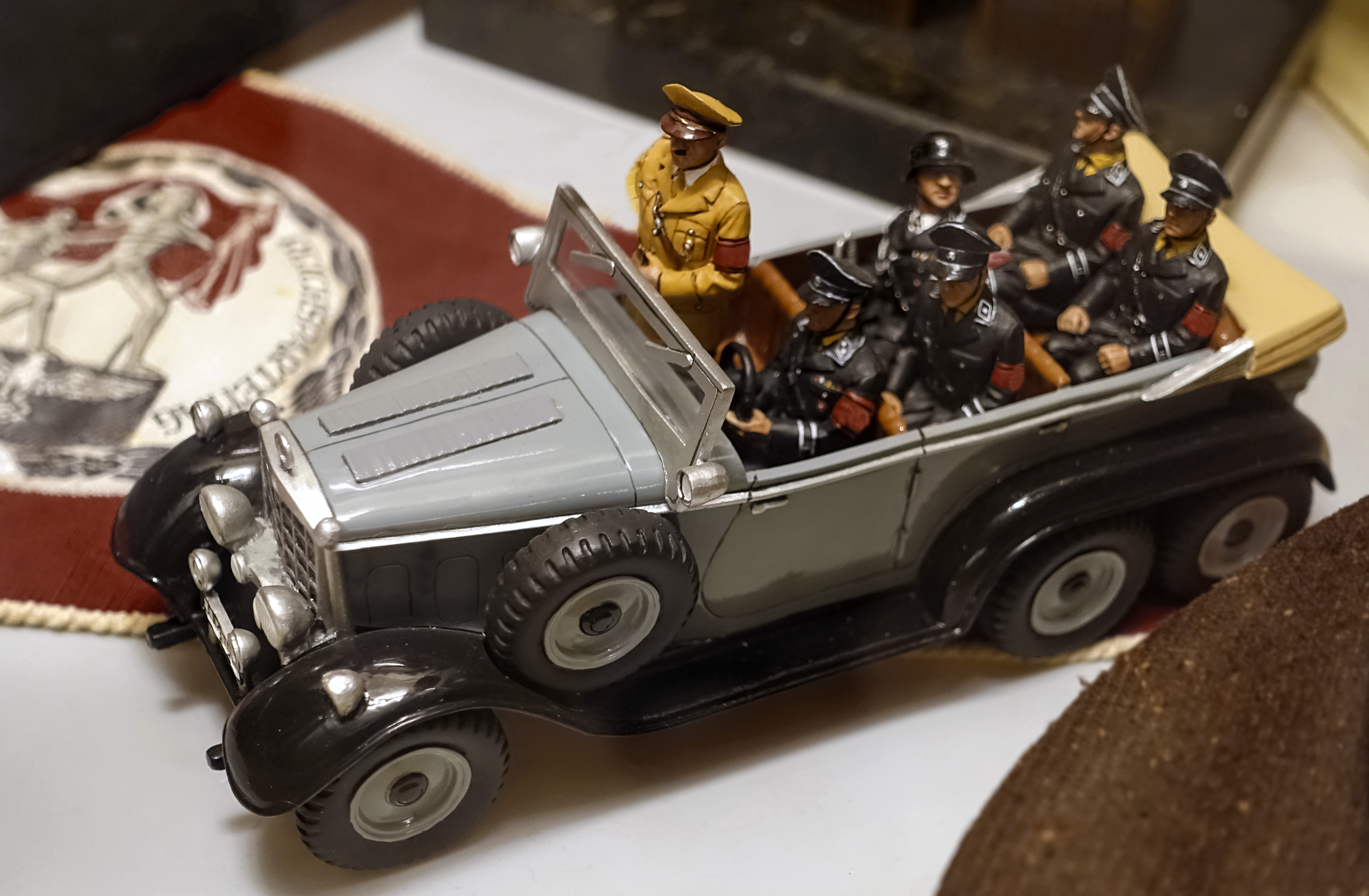

As of 2009, King & Country was a leading manufacturer of toy soldiers; collectors have included Steven Spielberg, Phil Collins, Mike Myers, Rod Stewart, and the King of Tonga.
