= For God & Country (Reyes novel) =

2009 novel by Daniel Reyes

For God & Country (Book)
- (2009)
- Author: Daniel Reyes
- Cover artist: Rodney Connors
- Language: English
- Genre: Military fiction
- Publisher: Blue Planet Publishing
- Publication date: 2009
- Publication place: United States
- ISBN: 9780982429839

For God & Country is a 2009 American Military fiction by Daniel Reyes. It is set in modern California that becomes engaged in war as the story progresses. The novel follows a Marine named Eddie Valles as he returns home from war in the middle east only to be dragged into a war at home.

For God & Country won the 2009 Allbooks Review Best New Fiction Award.

== Plot ==
Edward Valles, a Marine, returns from his final tour in the middle east to his family in Los Angeles. He is fulfilling his final duty as a recruiter and promises his wife that he is done with war and will leave the Marine Corps after the duty is complete.

A team of Homeland Security agents find crates with military arsenal building up in Mexico and suspect something is about to happen. At the same time a coalition of countries hostile towards the United States has been meeting in secret and moving forward on a plot that has been years in the making.

On a camping trip with his fellow recruiters, Eddie witnesses the detonation of nuclear bombs in downtown Los Angeles, which is followed by an invasion across the Mexican border. His fellow recruiters and him decide to report to 29 Palms deep in the desert and join the group that is forming to counter strike against the invaders. This is when he meets the Battery Operated Grunts, a group of Marines from the communication school that is running the convoys communications during the mission. He joins the group and meets the different personalities along the way and their reasons for volunteering for the mission.

After the convoy gets attacked along the freeway, they reach their first checkpoint at a mall. After setting up the communications with command, the convoy gets attacked by a group of Americans using the mall as a shelter, but the communication team is able to escape without a casualty. The next check point is to be a National Guard Armory that is found to have been overwhelmed by gang members. The Marines retake the Armory but one of the Battery Operated grunts is lost in the combat.

The convoy approaches the invading forces stronghold on the Santa Monica Pier. The convoy attacks and takes heavy losses, including two of the remaining four Battery Operated grunts. The convoy is saved by a second convoy that was supposed to reinforce Camp Pendleton but found the base leveled. The story ends with Eddie recruiting his brother Giovanni into the Marine Corps.

== Awards, nominations, and recognition ==
- The 2009 Allbooks Review – Editors Choice Best New Fiction Award.
