= Gods and Kings =

Gods and Kings may refer to:

- Gods and Kings, 1945 collection of six one-act plays by Lajos Bíró
- Gods and Kings, Christian historical fiction novel by Lynn Austin
- Civilization V: Gods & Kings, a videogame
- Gods and Kings: The Rise and Fall of Alexander McQueen and John Galliano, a 2015 book

== See also ==
- Exodus: Gods and Kings, 2014 epic biblical drama film directed by Ridley Scott
