= Nic Collins (drummer) =

Swiss drummer (born 2001)

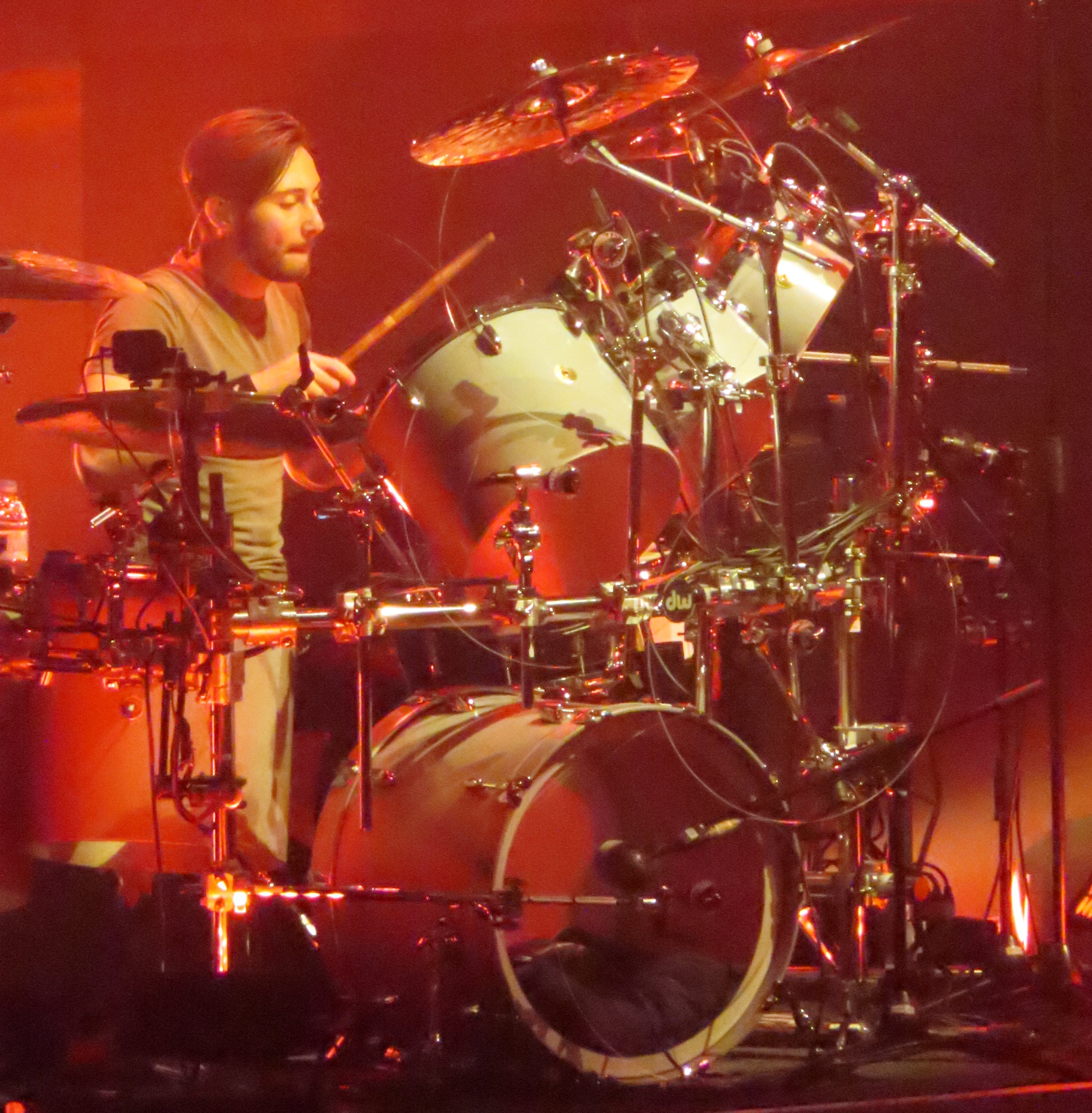
- Collins performing with Genesis in 2022

Background information
- Born: Nicolas Collins; 21 April 2001 (age 25); Geneva, Switzerland
- Genres: Pop rock; progressive rock
- Occupation: Drummer
- Years active: 2016–present

Nicholas Collins (born 21 April 2001) is a Swiss drummer, known for his association with his father Phil Collins, Genesis and Mike and the Mechanics, as well as for his bands, Better Strangers and the Effect.

== Early life ==
Collins is the son of drummer and singer Phil Collins and his third wife Orianne Cevey. He is the half-brother of actress Lily Collins. Collins started drumming at the age of two.

== Career ==
Collins first got exposure at age 15 playing drums on his father's Not Dead Yet comeback tour, which started in 2017 and concluded in 2019.

Collins continued to play with his father on Genesis's The Last Domino? Tour, which started in 2021 and concluded in 2022. Keyboardist Tony Banks praised Collins's skills, saying "Nic is a great drummer, but he is capable of sounding like early Phil. For Mike and I, that was always quite exciting. It means you can play some of the songs that you haven't played with Phil as the drummer for a long time."

In 2022, Collins debuted his new band, Better Strangers, which also includes bassist Yang Waingarten, guitarist Joey Rodriguez, and singer Ricky deCasa. In April 2022, they released their debut single "But I Don't Know Your Name".

In September 2022, Collins was announced to be touring with Mike and the Mechanics on their 2023 Refueled tour, covering for regular drummer, Gary Wallis.

In October 2023, Collins debuted another band, the Effect, which also includes guitarist Trev Lukather (son of Toto guitarist, Steve Lukather), keyboardist Steve Maggiora, bassist Josh Paul and singer Emmett Stang. The Effect released their debut single "Unwanted" that same month.
