= Calling All Stations Tour =

1997–1998 concert tour by Genesis

- Tour by Genesis
- Poster to the concert in Brussels, Belgium
- Location: Europe; North America
- Associated album: Calling All Stations
- Start date: 24 August 1997
- End date: 31 May 1998
- Legs: 3
- No. of shows: 49 (93 scheduled)

Genesis concert chronology
- We Can't Dance Tour (1992); Calling All Stations Tour (1997–98); Turn It On Again Tour (2007)

Genesis supported their 1997 album Calling All Stations with a European tour spanning 47 dates from 29 January to 31 May 1998, playing in large arenas across Europe. The core trio of lead vocalist Ray Wilson, keyboardist Tony Banks, and guitarist/bassist Mike Rutherford were joined by Israeli musician Nir Zidkyahu on drums, percussion, and backing vocals and Irish musician Anthony Drennan on guitar and bass. This was the only tour featuring Wilson, Zidkyahu, and Drennan, the first since 1970 not to include longtime singer/drummer Phil Collins, the first since 1977 not to include touring drummer Chester Thompson, and the first since 1978 not to include touring guitarist Daryl Stuermer. Rehearsals were held at Bray Film Studios in Windsor and the Working Men's Club in Chiddingfold, England, near the band's recording studio. The tour concluded with appearances at the Rock im Park Festival festivals in Germany. A majority of the older songs were transposed to a lower key to accommodate Wilson's vocal range. Midway through the set was an acoustic medley of songs from their 1970s output.

A planned 23-date North American tour in large arenas, scheduled to start in November 1997, was cancelled due to insufficient ticket sales, as was a revised 20-date schedule in smaller venues. Following the conclusion of the European tour, Genesis went on hiatus. Wilson was later informed by Banks and Rutherford that the band would not be continuing. It was the band's final tour until Collins returned for the 2007 Turn It On Again reunion tour. The tour is captured live on the promotional album Calling Radio Stations, and various unofficial albums.

== Set list ==
1. "No Son of Mine"
2. "Land Of Confusion"
3. "The Lamb Lies Down on Broadway"
4. "Calling All Stations"
5. "The Carpet Crawlers"
6. "There Must Be Some Other Way" *or* "Alien Afternoon"
7. "Domino"
8. "Firth of Fifth" (part 2)
9. "Congo"
10. "Home by the Sea" / "Second Home by the Sea"
11. Acoustic set
  1. "Dancing With The Moonlit Knight" (excerpt)
  2. "Follow You Follow Me" (excerpt)
  3. "Supper's Ready" (part 1, excerpt)
  4. "Not About Us"
12. "Mama"
13. "The Dividing Line"
14. "Invisible Touch"
15. "Turn It On Again"

Encore

1. "Throwing It All Away"
2. "I Can't Dance" (with audience participation)

=== Additional songs ===
- "That's All" dropped in favour of "Alien Afternoon".
- "Hold On My Heart" dropped in favour of "Shipwrecked".
- "Shipwrecked" dropped to shorten the set.
- "Alien Afternoon" and "There Must Be Some Other Way" occasionally swapped to shorten the set, as it was originally too long for the band to perform nightly.
- "Not About Us" added to the acoustic set.

=== Rehearsal songs (never played during the tour) ===
- "Small Talk"

== Personnel ==
Genesis

- Ray Wilson – lead vocals
- Tony Banks – keyboards, backing vocals
- Mike Rutherford – guitars, bass, backing vocals

Additional musicians

- Anthony Drennan – bass, guitar, additional backing vocals
- Nir Zidkyahu – drums, percussion, backing vocals on "Follow You Follow Me"

== Tour dates ==
Date	City	Country	Venue
European TV Promotional Appearance
24 August 1997	Berlin	Germany	Berlin Television Tower (VH1 interview and acoustic performance)
United States TV Promotional Appearance
26 August 1997	Cape Canaveral	United States	Kennedy Space Center (interview and acoustic performance)
Pre-Tour Rehearsal
18 September – 5 October 1997	Chiddingfold	England	Working Mens Club
6 October 1997 – 25 January 1998	Windsor	England	Bray Film Studios
European Radio Appearances
17 November 1997	?	Denmark	Danish Radio
11 December 1997	Paris	France	RTL French Radio Studios
Leg 1 — North America (Arena Tour Canceled)
~~5 November 1997~~	~~Albany~~	United States	~~Pepsi Arena~~
~~7 November 1997~~	~~Pittsburgh~~	United States	~~Civic Center~~
~~8 November 1997~~	~~Buffalo~~	United States	~~Marine Midland Arena~~
~~11 November 1997~~	~~University Park~~	United States	~~Bryce Jordan Center~~
~~12 November 1997~~	~~Fairborn~~	United States	~~Ervin J. Nutter Center~~
~~14 November 1997~~	~~Auburn Hills~~	United States	~~Palace of Auburn Hills~~
~~15 November 1997~~	~~Cleveland~~	United States	~~Gund Arena~~
~~18 November 1997~~	~~Madison~~	United States	~~Dane County Expo Center~~
~~19 November 1997~~	~~Milwaukee~~	United States	~~Bradley Center~~
~~21 November 1997~~	~~St. Louis~~	United States	~~Kiel Center~~
~~22 November 1997~~	~~Chicago~~	United States	~~Rosemont Horizon~~
~~25 November 1997~~	~~Ottawa~~	Canada	~~Corel Centre~~
~~27 November 1997~~	~~Toronto~~	Canada	~~Maple Leaf Gardens~~
~~28 November 1997~~	~~Montreal~~	Canada	~~Molson Centre~~
~~5 December 1997~~	~~Philadelphia~~	United States	~~Core States Center~~
~~6 December 1997~~	~~Philadelphia~~	United States	~~Core States Center~~
~~9 December 1997~~	~~Boston~~	United States	~~Fleet Center~~
~~11 December 1997~~	~~Hartford~~	United States	~~Hartford Civic Center~~
~~12 December 1997~~	~~Long Island~~	United States	~~Nassau Coliseum~~
~~13 December 1997~~	~~Landover~~	United States	~~USAir Arena~~
~~18 December 1997~~	~~Miami~~	United States	~~Miami Arena~~
~~19 December 1997~~	~~Orlando~~	United States	~~Orlando Arena~~
~~21 December 1997~~	~~Tampa~~	United States	~~Ice Palace~~
Leg 1 — North America (Theater Tour Canceled)
~~5 November 1997~~	~~Milwaukee~~	United States	~~Riverside Theatre~~
~~8 November 1997~~	~~Normal~~	United States	~~Braden Auditorium~~
~~9 November 1997~~	~~Chicago~~	United States	~~Rosemont Theatre~~
~~12 November 1997~~	~~St. Louis~~	United States	~~Fox Theatre~~
~~14 November 1997~~	~~Auburn Hills~~	United States	~~Palace of Auburn Hills~~
~~15 November 1997~~	~~Columbus~~	United States	~~Veterans Memorial Auditorium~~
~~17 November 1997~~	~~Toronto~~	Canada	~~Hummingbird Centre~~
~~18 November 1997~~	~~Toronto~~	Canada	~~Hummingbird Centre~~
~~23 November 1997~~	~~New York City~~	United States	~~Beacon Theatre~~
~~24 November 1997~~	~~New York City~~	United States	~~Beacon Theatre~~
~~28 November 1997~~	~~Montreal~~	Canada	~~Molson Centre~~
~~4 December 1997~~	~~Boston~~	United States	~~Orpheum Theatre~~
~~6 December 1997~~	~~Hartford~~	United States	~~Meadows Music Center~~
~~10 December 1997~~	~~Upper Darby Township~~	United States	~~Tower Theater~~
~~11 December 1997~~	~~Upper Darby Township~~	United States	~~Tower Theater~~
~~14 December 1997~~	~~Washington, D.C.~~	United States	~~MCI Theater~~
~~15 December 1997~~	~~Pittsburgh~~	United States	~~AJ Palumbo Center~~
~~18 December 1997~~	~~Grand Rapids~~	United States	~~Van Andel Arena~~
~~19 December 1997~~	~~Cleveland~~	United States	~~Cleveland Music Hall~~
~~20 December 1997~~	~~Cleveland~~	United States	~~Cleveland Music Hall~~
Leg 2 — European Arena Tour
28 January 1998	Budapest	Hungary	Sportcsarnok (rehearsal)
29 January 1998	Budapest	Hungary	Sportcsarnok
31 January 1998 +	Katowice	Poland	Spodek
2 February 1998 +	Prague	Czech Republic	Sportovní hala
4 February 1998	Mannheim	Germany	Maimarkthalle
5 February 1998	Leipzig	Germany	Messehalle 7
6 February 1998	Berlin	Germany	Velodrom
8 February 1998	Metz	France	Galaxie Amnéville
10 February 1998	Dortmund	Germany	Westfalenhalle
12 February 1998	Stuttgart	Germany	Schleyerhalle
13 February 1998 *	Zurich	Switzerland	Hallenstadion
15 February 1998 +	Vienna	Austria	Wiener Stadthalle
17 February 1998 *	Bologna	Italy	Palasport Casalecchio
18 February 1998 *	Rome	Italy	Palasport Roma
19 February 1998 *	Milan	Italy	Filaforum
20 February 1998	Lyon	France	Halle Tony Garnier
23 February 1998	Paris	France	Bercy Palais Omnisports
25 February 1998	Birmingham	England	NEC Arena
26 February 1998	Birmingham	England	NEC Arena
27 February 1998	London	England	Earls Court Arena
1 March 1998 (Note: The 1 March 1998 concert in Glasgow was originally scheduled to take place on 29 January 1998.)	Glasgow	Scotland	Scottish Exhibition & Conference Centre
2 March 1998 (Note: The 2 March 1998 concert in Newcastle was originally scheduled to take place on 30 January 1998.)	Newcastle	England	Telewest Arena
4 March 1998 (Note: The 4 and 5 March 1998 concerts in Cardiff were originally scheduled to take place on 27 January 1998.)	Cardiff	Wales	Cardiff International Arena
5 March 1998	Cardiff	Wales	Cardiff International Arena
6 March 1998 (Note: The 6 March 1998 concert in Manchester was originally scheduled to take place on 28 January 1998.)	Manchester	England	NYNEX Arena
8 March 1998	Dublin	Ireland	The Point, Dublin
10 March 1998	Brussels	Belgium	Forest National
11 March 1998	Rotterdam	Netherlands	Rotterdam Ahoy Sportpaleis
14 March 1998	Lille	France	Lille Zenith
15 March 1998	Angers	France	Amphithéa 4000
16 March 1998	Bordeaux	France	Patinoire de Mériadeck
18 March 1998	Pau	France	Zénith de Pau
19 March 1998	Madrid	Spain	Palacio de Deportes
20 March 1998	Barcelona	Spain	Palau Sant Jordi
22 March 1998	Marseille	France	Le Dome
~~23 March 1998~~	~~Clermont-Ferrand~~	France	~~Clermont Ferrand Maison des Sports~~
24 March 1998	Caen	France	Zénith de Caen
26 March 1998	Strasbourg	France	Rhénus Hall
27 March 1998	Munich	Germany	Olympiahalle
28 March 1998	Erfurt	Germany	Erfurt Messehalle
30 March 1998	Hamburg	Germany	Sporthalle Hamburg
~~31 March 1998~~	~~Bielefeld~~	Germany	~~Seidenstickerhalle~~
~~1 April 1998~~	~~Copenhagen~~	~~Denmark~~	~~Copenhagen Forum~~
2 April 1998	Oslo	Norway	Oslo Spektrum
3 April 1998	Stockholm	Sweden	Stockholm Globe Arena
5 April 1998	Helsinki	Finland	Hartwall Arena
Leg 3 — Summer European Festival Tour
30 May 1998 +	Nürburg	Germany	Nürburgring (Rock am Ring Festival)
31 May 1998 +	Nuremberg	Germany	Frankenstadion (Rock im Park Festival) (final show with Ray Wilson, Anthony Drennan, and Nir Zidkyahu)

- + Filmed for television
- * Filmed privately
