= RPWL =

German progressive rock band

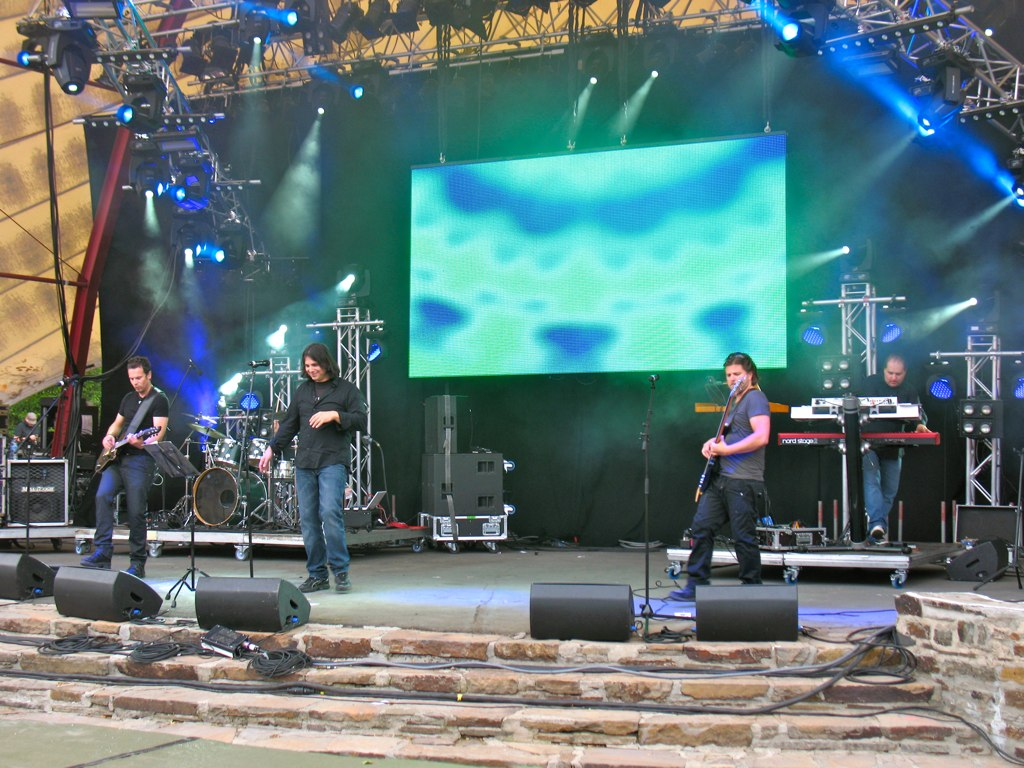
- RPWL in 2011

Background information
- Origin: Germany
- Genre: Progressive rock
- Years active: 1997–present
- Members: Jürgen "Yogi" Lang; Kalle Wallner; Marc Turiaux; Markus Grützner
- Past members: Chris Postl; Phil Paul Rissettio; Stephan Ebner; Andreas Wernthaler; Manfred Müller; Markus Jehle; Werner Taus
- Website: rpwl.de

RPWL is a German progressive rock band that consists of Jürgen "Yogi" Lang, Kalle Wallner, Marc Turiaux, and Markus Grützner. As of 2026, they have released eight studio albums, eight live albums, and three compilations.

== History ==
RPWL was formed in 1997 in Freising, Germany, as a Pink Floyd cover band. The group's name is a combination of the first letters of the original four members' last names: Rissettio, Postl, Wallner, and Lang.

After three years, they began to write their own music, based on earlier influences. Their debut album, God Has Failed, came out in 2000.

2002 brought Trying to Kiss the Sun, which saw the band developing their own sound and relying less on previous influences. They released a compilation album called Stock a year later, consisting of tracks that didn't make it onto their previous two albums, plus a cover of Syd Barrett's "Opel".

In 2005, RPWL issued their third studio album, World Through My Eyes, with the single "Roses". The song featured ex-Genesis and Stiltskin singer Ray Wilson on lead vocals. A special edition of the album was released as an SACD hybrid disc.

Later that year, the band published their second concert album, Start the Fire (Live). The double disc contains the entirety of their Rockpalast concert, again featuring Ray Wilson on lead vocals for "Roses" and one other track, "Not About Us", from the 1997 Genesis album, Calling All Stations, the only one on which Wilson appears.

On 9 September 2007, the band released 9, an album consisting of unreleased live songs and four brand new solo tracks by Yogi Lang, Chris Postl, Manni Müller, and Kalle Wallner.

In February 2008, they released an album titled The RPWL Experience. This was followed by Beyond Man and Time in 2012 and Wanted in 2014. In 2016, the band issued a live album containing a full performance of Pink Floyd's The Man and The Journey. Their next studio album, Tales from Outer Space, came out in 2019, followed by Crime Scene in 2023.

== Band members ==
Current

- Jürgen "Yogi" Lang – vocals, keyboards (1997–present)
- Kalle Wallner – guitars, bass (1997–present)
- Marc Turiaux – drums (2008–present)
- Markus Grützner – bass (2022–present)

Past

- Chris Postl – bass (1997–2000, 2005–2010)
- Phil Paul Rissettio – drums (1997–2003)
- Stephan Ebner – bass (2000–2005)
- Andreas Wernthaler – keyboards (2000–2003)
- Manfred Müller – drums (2003–2008)
- Markus Jehle – keyboards (2005–2022)
- Werner Taus – bass (2010–2018)

Lineups

1997–2000	2000–2003	2003–2005	2005–2008
Yogi Lang – vocals, keyboards; Chris Postl – bass; Phil Paul Rissettio – drums; Kalle Wallner – guitars	Yogi Lang – vocals, keyboards; Phil Paul Rissettio – drums; Kalle Wallner – guitars; Stephan Ebner – bass; Andreas Wernthaler – keyboards	Yogi Lang – vocals, keyboards; Kalle Wallner – guitars; Stephan Ebner – bass; Manfred Müller – drums	Yogi Lang – vocals, keyboards; Kalle Wallner – guitars; Manfred Müller – drums; Markus Jehle – keyboards; Chris Postl – bass
2008–2010	2010–2018	2018–2022	2022–present
Yogi Lang – vocals, keyboards; Kalle Wallner – guitars; Markus Jehle – keyboards; Chris Postl – bass; Marc Turiaux – drums	Yogi Lang – vocals, keyboards; Kalle Wallner – guitars; Markus Jehle – keyboards; Marc Turiaux – drums; Werner Taus – bass	Yogi Lang – vocals, keyboards; Kalle Wallner – guitars, bass; Markus Jehle – keyboards; Marc Turiaux – drums	Yogi Lang – vocals, keyboards; Kalle Wallner – guitars, bass; Marc Turiaux – drums; Markus Grützner – bass

== Discography ==
Studio albums

- God Has Failed (2000)
- Trying to Kiss the Sun (2002)
- World Through My Eyes (2005)
- The RPWL Experience (2008)
- Beyond Man and Time (2012)
- Wanted (2014)
- Tales from Outer Space (2019)
- Crime Scene (2023)

Live albums

- Start the Fire (Live) (2005)
- The RPWL Live Experience (2009)
- A Show Beyond Man and Time (2013)
- RPWL plays Pink Floyd (2015)
- RPWL plays Pink Floyd – The Man and The Journey (2016)
- A New Dawn (2017)
- Live from Outer Space (2019)
- God Has Failed – Live & Personal (2021)
- True Live Crime (2024)
- World Through My Eyes (2026)

Compilations

- Stock (2003)
- 9 (2007)
- The Gentle Art of Music (2010)
