= Millionairhead =

Studio album by Cut_
- Released: 1999
- Recorded: Jaggy Thorn Basement and Castle Sound
- Genre: Rock
- Length: 59:06 (2007 reissue)
- Label: Virgin Germany; InsideOut Music
- Producer: Ray Wilson

Cut_ chronology
Millionairhead (1999)	Live and Acoustic (By Ray Wilson) (2002)

Millionairhead is the only album by Cut_, a project led by Ray Wilson. It was Wilson's first release on which he took on the majority of the songwriting duties.

The album proved to be a one-off project; Wilson would go on to record his own solo albums as well as with the reformed version of Stiltskin.

Wilson recorded a reworked version of "Another Day" for his solo album Change in 2003. He frequently plays some songs from this album at his solo concerts. Live versions of "Another Day", "Sarah", and "Gypsy" can be found on Ray Wilson Live (2004), live versions of "Another Day", "Sarah", and "Ghost" can be found on An Audience and Ray Wilson (2006).

In October 2007, the album was re-released worldwide with three bonus tracks which were previously released as b-sides.

DJ and trance producer Armin van Buuren has produced remixes of the songs "Another Day" (retitled "Yet Another Day") and "Gypsy" from Millionairhead. Both remixes have been released on van Buuren's own albums, and "Yet Another Day" was also released as a single.

== Track listing ==
1. "Jigsaw" (Ray Wilson)
2. "Sarah" (R. Wilson)
3. "Another Day" (R. Wilson)
4. "Hey, Hey" (R. Wilson)
5. "Millionairhead" (R. Wilson)
6. "Shoot The Moon" (Steve Wilson)
7. "Young Ones" (R. Wilson)
8. "No Place for a Loser" (R. Wilson)
9. "Space Oddity" (David Bowie)
10. "I Hear You Calling" (R. Wilson, S. Wilson)
11. "Gypsy" (R. Wilson)
12. "Ghost" (R. Wilson)

2007 re-release bonus tracks

13. "Dark" (b-side of "Sarah") (S. Wilson)
14. "Adolescent Breakdown" (b-side of "Another Day") (R. Wilson)
15. "Reason For Running" (b-side of "Sarah") (R. Wilson)

== Singles ==
=== Another Day ===
1. "Another Day" (Album Version) - 3.49
2. "I Hear You Calling" (Album Version) - 3.35
3. "Adolescent Breakdown" (Monitor Mix) - 3.16"

=== Sarah ===
1. "Sarah" (Album Version) - 3.51
2. "Young Ones" (Live Version) - 5.02
3. "Reason For Running" - 2.51
4. "Dark" - 4.54

=== Millionairhead ===
1. "Millionairhead" (Album Version) - 2.28
2. "Reason For Running" - 2.51
3. "Dark" - 4.54

== Personnel ==
- Ray Wilson – vocals, guitars
- Steve Wilson – guitars
- John Haimes – bass
- Paul Holmes – keyboards
- Nir Z – drums

== Production ==
- Engineered by Ian Huffman
- Recorded at Jaggy Thorn Basement and Castle Sound
- Mixed by Nick Davis at the Fisher Lane Farm
- Mastered by Bob Ludwig, Gateway
- Produced by Ray Wilson
