= Change (Ray Wilson album) =

Studio album by Ray Wilson
- Released: April 2003
- Recorded: 2001–2002
- Studio: Jaggy Thorn Studio (Edinburgh, Scotland); Brooklyn Broadcast And Audio (New York City, New York, USA)
- Genre: Acoustic rock
- Length: 41:15; 55:04 (special edition)
- Label: InsideOut Music (UK and Germany)
- Producer: Ray Wilson

Ray Wilson chronology
| Live and Acoustic (2002) | Change (2003) | The Next Best Thing (2004) |

Professional ratings
Review scores
| Source | Rating |
|---|---|
| Allmusic | 3/5 stars |

Change is the first solo studio album by Ray Wilson, after his live album the previous year. He started to gain success after a series of sold-out gigs during the 2001 Edinburgh Festival. The album achieved a new form of success and he did a series of tour dates throughout Europe.

== Track listing (Regular edition) ==
1. "Intro" (Ray Wilson) - 0:26
2. "Goodbye Baby Blue" (R. Wilson) - 3:58
3. "Change" (R. Wilson) - 4:09
4. "Along the Way" (Steve Wilson) - 3:39
5. "Yesterday" (R. Wilson) - 3:31
6. "Beach" (R. Wilson) - 3:28
7. "Cry If You Want To" (R. Wilson) - 3:27
8. "Beautiful Child" (R. Wilson) - 2:57
9. "She Fades Away" (S. Wilson) - 3:34
10. "I Look for You There" (S. Wilson) - 0:55
11. "Believe" (R. Wilson) - 3:03
12. "Another Day" (R. Wilson) - 3:50
13. "The Last Horizon" (R. Wilson) - 4:09

=== Track listing (Special edition extra tracks) ===
14. "Gouranga" (R. Wilson) - 4:48
15. "Dark" (S. Wilson) - 4:55
16. "Cool Water" (R. Wilson) - 3:54

=== Track listing (2CD Tour edition) ===
1. "No Son of Mine" (Tony Banks, Phil Collins, Mike Rutherford) - 4:47
2. "Change" (R. Wilson) - 3:43
3. "Follow You Follow Me" (Banks, Collins, Rutherford) - 3:43
4. "Along the Way" (R. Wilson) - 3:40
5. "Ripples" (Banks, Rutherford) - 4:07
6. "Believe" (R. Wilson) - 3:13
7. "One" (U2) - 4:42
8. "Beach" (R. Wilson) - 3:15
9. "I Know What I Like" (Banks, Collins, Peter Gabriel, Steve Hackett, Rutherford) - 4:00
10. "Fading Lights" (Banks, Collins, Rutherford) - 5:03

== Personnel ==
- Ray Wilson – vocals, acoustic piano, strings, guitars, bass guitar, mouth organ
- Uncle Jack – programming
- Brian McAlpine – accordion (1, 5, 8, 12, 13)
- Irvin Duguid – Wurlitzer electric piano (2, 4, 7, 9), Hammond organ (2, 4, 7, 9), strings (2, 4, 7, 9)
- Adam Holzman – Wurlitzer electric piano (3, 6)
- Paul Holmes – keyboards (14, 15), strings (14, 15)
- Steve Wilson – guitars, backing vocals
- Taj Wyzgowski – guitars (2, 3, 5), slide guitar (2, 3, 5), mandolin (2, 3, 5)
- Andy Hess – bass guitar (3, 6, 9, 12)
- David Paton – bass (4)
- John Haimes – bass (14, 15)
- Nir Z – drums (2–4, 6, 7, 9, 12, 14, 15), percussion (2–4, 6, 7, 9, 12, 14, 15)
- James Mackintosh – percussion (5)
- Jenny Gardner – violin (14)
- Ornette Clennon – clarinet (16)
- Amanda Lyon – vocals

=== Production ===
- Ray Wilson – producer
- Uncle Jack – engineer, mixing
- Mark Finlay – mastering
- David Taylor – mastering
- CAVT (Las Vegas, Nevada) – mastering location
- Thomas Ewerhard – cover design, layout
- Scott Spence – cover design
- Bernie Velasco – photography
- Frajo Kromeich – management

== Singles ==
- "Change" (March 2003)
1. "Change" (Radio Edit)
2. "Change" (Album Version)
3. "Change" (Radio Remix)
4. "Gouranga" (Single Bonus Track)
5. "Not About Us" (taken from Live & Acoustic)
- "Goodbye Baby Blue" (September 2003)
1. "Goodbye Baby Blue" (Single Edit)
2. "Goodbye Baby Blue" (Album Version)
3. "Change" (Live Acoustic Version)
4. "Ripples" (Live Acoustic Version)
5. "Believe" (Live Acoustic Version)
