= Lawrie MacMillan =

Lawrie MacMillan is a Scottish bass guitarist and bass teacher from Rosyth in Fife, Scotland.

Lawrie MacMillan is best known for his work with the chart-topping group Stiltskin, fronted by the vocalist Ray Wilson, who in the late 1990s also fronted the band Genesis, replacing Phil Collins. As Ray Wilson's bassist, he is also involved in the Genesis Classic touring show.

A co-founder of Fife-based award winning party band Cut the Cake, he has also performed, toured and recorded with artists and bands including Stuart Adamson, The Raphaels, Marcus Hummon, Amy Duncan, The Iron Horse (Scottish band) and was featured as Glasgow Royal Concert Hall's house bass player on the BBC Two series, Ealtainn and the BBC Alba series Ceol Country.

More recently, Lawrie has performed as bass player with the Red Hot Chilli Pipers in Dubai, Luxembourg, Canada and the USA.

He endorses MarkBass amplification in Europe, Nordstrand pickups, Elixir Strings and plays Sadowsky bass guitars.
