= Trying to Kiss the Sun =

Trying To Kiss the Sun

Studio album by RPWL
- Released: July 2, 2002
- Recorded: Farmlands Studios, 2001
- Genre: Progressive rock
- Length: 59:34
- Label: Tempus Fugit
- Producer: Yogi Lang

RPWL chronology
| God Has Failed (2000) | Trying To Kiss the Sun (2002) | World Through My Eyes (2005) |

Professional ratings
Review scores
| Source | Rating |
|---|---|
| Allmusic | link |

Trying to Kiss the Sun is a studio album by the German progressive rock band RPWL, released in 2002. It is the band's second studio album.

== Track listing ==
1. Trying to Kiss the Sun (3:45)
2. Waiting for a Smile (7:04)
3. I Don't Know (What It's Like) (4:32)
4. Sugar for the Ape (5:03)
5. Side by Side (8:35)
6. You (6:49)
7. Tell Me Why (5:08)
8. Believe Me (5:14)
9. Sunday Morning (4:29)
10. Home Again (8:52)

== Personnel ==
- Yogi Lang – vocals, keyboards
- Karlheinz Wallner – guitars
- Stephan Ebner – bass
- Phil Paul Rissettio – drums
- Andreas Wernthaler – keyboards

== Extra personnel ==
- Chris Postl – Bass
- Stephan Caron – Coral sitar

== Production ==
- Produced by Lang and Wallner
- Recorded and mixed at Farmlands
- Cover design by Stefan Wittmann
- Photos by Katharina Steinberger
