= Congo (song) =

Single by Genesis

from the album Calling All Stations
- B-side: "Papa He Said"; "Banjo Man"
- Released: 15 September 1997
- Recorded: The Farm (Chiddingfold, Surrey)
- Genre: Alternative rock
- Length: 4:03 (single version); 4:51 (album version)
- Label: Atlantic (US and Canada); Virgin (rest of the world)
- Songwriters: Tony Banks; Mike Rutherford
- Producers: Genesis; Nick Davis

Genesis singles chronology
| "Invisible Touch (Live)" (1992) | "Congo" (1997) | "Shipwrecked" (1997) |

"Congo" is a song by the English rock band Genesis, released in September 1997 as the first single from their fifteenth studio album, Calling All Stations (1997). The single marked the debut of Ray Wilson as the lead vocalist for the band. It was a hit across Europe, although it became their first lead single since 1977 to not reach the UK top 20, peaking at number 29. It was also the band's last top 40 hit, and their only with Wilson.

== Composition ==
The song is about two people who cannot get along with each other in their relationship, leaving them to want to be rid of each other and as distant as possible ("Send me to the Congo" is a metaphor for this). Musically, the song opens with a Caribbean drum beat while an African-style tribe is heard chanting "Congo the Congo", before the song launches into a darker melody driven by synthesiser, guitar, and gated reverb drums. Appropriately, part of the song's refrain takes its lyrical meter from the conga (Latin American rhythm). The album version features a synthesiser solo and extra verses that fade out, while the single version has an earlier fade-out.

== Chart performance ==
The song did not chart on the US Billboard Hot 100 chart. In the US, it reached position number 25 on 30 August 1997 in the Mainstream Rock charts. The single was the most added track to US radio for the week 15 August 1997.

== Releases and performances ==
"Congo" was the band's lead single from Calling All Stations and was played at all of the band's live shows on the Calling All Stations tour, generally in the middle of the set. The single version appeared on the band's greatest hits collection Turn It On Again: The Hits. Wilson has performed the song live for his solo Genesis Klassik tour.

== Music video ==
The music video for "Congo", directed by Howard Greenhalgh, features industrialised imagery, with the band playing in a heavily guarded shipyard manned with slave labour. Massive water cannons are used to control uprisings, and the band is frequently doused with water throughout the video. The video was filmed in early July 1997 at the Mediterranean Film Studios in Malta.

== B-sides ==
The song's B-sides include "Papa He Said" and "Banjo Man". "Banjo Man" was originally slated for inclusion on Calling All Stations, but it was removed from the album's track listing at the last moment.

The enhanced CD version of the single had an edited version of "Second Home by the Sea" as the B-side.

== Track listings ==
=== CD single ===
| No. | Title | Writer(s) | Length |
|---|---|---|---|
| 1. | "Congo" (edit) | Tony Banks; Mike Rutherford | 3:13 |
| 2. | "Papa He Said" (non-album track) | Banks; Rutherford | 4:07 |
| 3. | "Banjo Man" (non-album track) | Banks; Rutherford; Ray Wilson | 4:20 |

=== Enhanced CD single ===
| No. | Title | Writer(s) | Length |
|---|---|---|---|
| 1. | "Congo" | Tony Banks; Mike Rutherford | 4:51 |
| 2. | "Second Home by the Sea" (edited version) | Collins; Banks; Rutherford | 4:54 |

=== CD promo ===
| No. | Title | Writer(s) | Length |
|---|---|---|---|
| 1. | "Congo" (edit) | Tony Banks; Mike Rutherford | 3:13 |
| 2. | "Papa He Said" (non-album track) | Banks; Rutherford | 4:07 |

== Charts ==
| Chart (1997) | Peak position |
|---|---|
| Austria (Ö3 Austria Top 40) | 35 |
| Germany (Media Control Charts) | 31 |
| Hungary (Mahasz) | 5 |
| Italy Airplay (Music & Media) | 3 |
| Switzerland (Schweizer Hitparade) | 32 |
| UK Singles (OCC) | 29 |
| US Mainstream Rock Tracks (Billboard) | 25 |

== Personnel ==
- Ray Wilson – vocals
- Tony Banks – keyboards, backing vocals
- Mike Rutherford – guitar, bass guitar, backing vocals
- Nir Zidkyahu – drums, percussion
