= Turn It On Again: The Tour =

2007 concert tour by Genesis

- Tour by Genesis
- Location: Europe; North America
- Start date: 11 June 2007
- End date: 13 October 2007
- Legs: 2
- No. of shows: 48

Genesis concert chronology
- Calling All Stations Tour (1997–98); Turn It On Again: The Tour (2007); The Last Domino? Tour (2021–22)

Turn It On Again: The Tour was a 2007 concert tour of Europe and North America by the English rock band Genesis. The tour was notable for the return of drummer and vocalist Phil Collins, who had fronted the band during their most commercially successful period before leaving in 1996, rejoining founder members Tony Banks and Mike Rutherford, with their traditional on-stage musicians, Chester Thompson on drums and Daryl Stuermer on guitar/bass.

== History ==
Collins was initially reported by the BBC as being interested in a reunion in November 2005. Collins had said he was "open" to a reunion featuring original lead singer Peter Gabriel where he would just be playing drums. After much speculation regarding a reunion, Tony Banks, Phil Collins and Mike Rutherford announced the tour on 7 November 2006, nearly 40 years after the band had first formed. Collins insisted it would be more of a "selection of shows" rather than a tour. Group manager Tony Smith was also on hand for the announcement, which was introduced by popular comedian and Genesis fan David Baddiel.

Originally, Collins, Banks and Rutherford wanted to reunite as a quintet with Peter Gabriel and Steve Hackett, for live performances of The Lamb Lies Down on Broadway. Gabriel had reportedly agreed in principle to perform, and as such Steve Hackett was also contacted, but as time went on, Gabriel could not commit to a date. "I think he's just a little overcautious sometimes about going to back to doing something that, basically, fundamentally, is just fun," Collins said at the November 2006 press conference announcing the trio's reunion. Once Gabriel declined, Hackett's participation became moot, and the decision was made to proceed as a three-piece. A short note expressing Hackett's good wishes for the reunion tour was placed on his website. In their stead, both Daryl Stuermer and Chester Thompson returned as supplementary on-stage musicians.

The band embarked on the first leg of the tour in Europe. The stage set was designed by Mark Fisher with lighting design by Patrick Woodroffe. The routing took in twelve countries beginning in Helsinki, Finland on 11 June 2007 and ending in Rome, Italy on 14 July 2007. The Rome show was a free concert for an audience of 500,000. This leg of the tour was documented in the film Come Rain or Shine, released as part of the three-DVD set When in Rome in 2008. The documentary shows the rather difficult conditions the band faced during the first leg, with rain hampering all but a handful of the shows during this portion of the tour. On the Paris and Amsterdam shows, the band was also accompanied by a La7/MTV crew, whose documentary, Genesis On the Road, aired on Italian TV before the Rome show.

The band held a press conference in New York City on 7 March 2007 at noon EST to announce the details of the North American leg of the Turn It On Again reunion tour. This leg commenced on 7 September 2007 in Toronto, Ontario, Canada at BMO Field and ended on 13 October 2007 at the Hollywood Bowl in Los Angeles, California. It was announced on 1 June that Genesis would be working with the Encore Series team at TheMusic.com to record each show of their European tour (and also done for their subsequent North American tour) for release as a 2-CD set (similar to the series done for the Who and Peter Gabriel). All shows were recorded directly off the soundboard and were previously available for either individual sale or as a complete box set of the entire tour.

The CD Live Over Europe 2007 was released on 20 November 2007 in North America and 26 November 2007, in the UK. The When in Rome 2007 triple-DVD set was released 26 May 2008 (10 June 2008 for North America) and featured the complete free concert filmed in Rome, Italy on 14 July 2007. The set also contains the documentary Come Rain or Shine which was broadcast in a selection of cinemas in the UK and Europe on 20 May 2008. The 27 June concert in Düsseldorf was broadcast live in HD and Dolby 5.1 Surround to cinemas in the UK, Spain and Sweden. Most of the tour was recorded directly from the soundboard and released in collaboration with the band by the Encore Music series and TheMusic.com.

The tour was notable as being the first time nearly every song was performed in a lower key to accommodate Collins's vocal range. Only "Hold on My Heart", "Follow You Follow Me" and all instrumentals were performed in the same key as their original studio recordings. Clips of Collins attempting to reach higher notes during rehearsals for "The Cinema Show" and "In Too Deep" appear in Come Rain or Shine. An additional clip from an October 2006 rehearsal in New York City shows the band discussing the key change for "Mama", with Collins referencing Elton John and his need to sing older songs in a much lower register than originally recorded. Collins added that Paul McCartney continues to sing all his songs in their original key, despite not being able to properly sing many of the higher notes.

== Set list ==
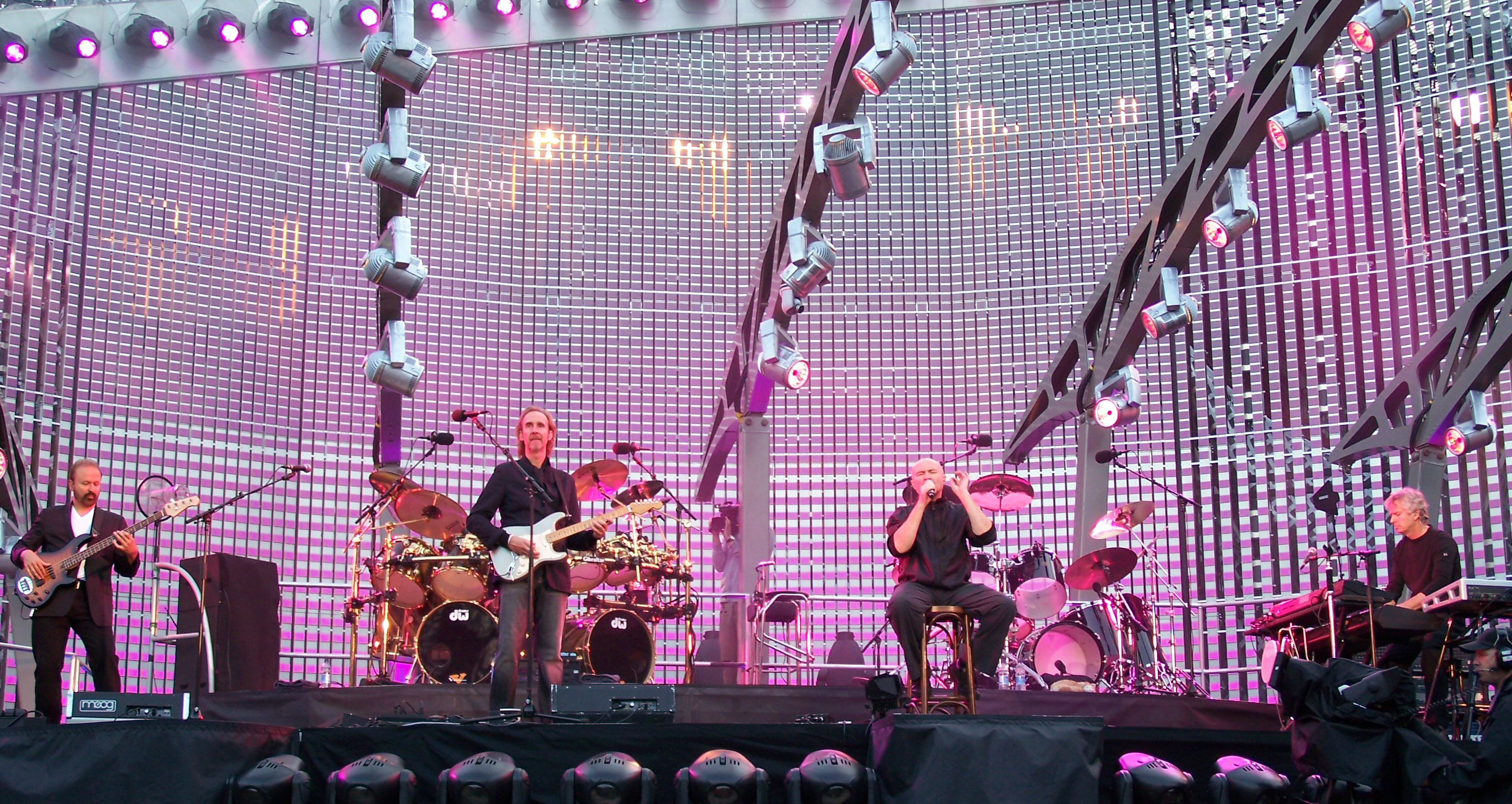
Genesis performing "Hold on My Heart" at Old Trafford, Manchester, England.

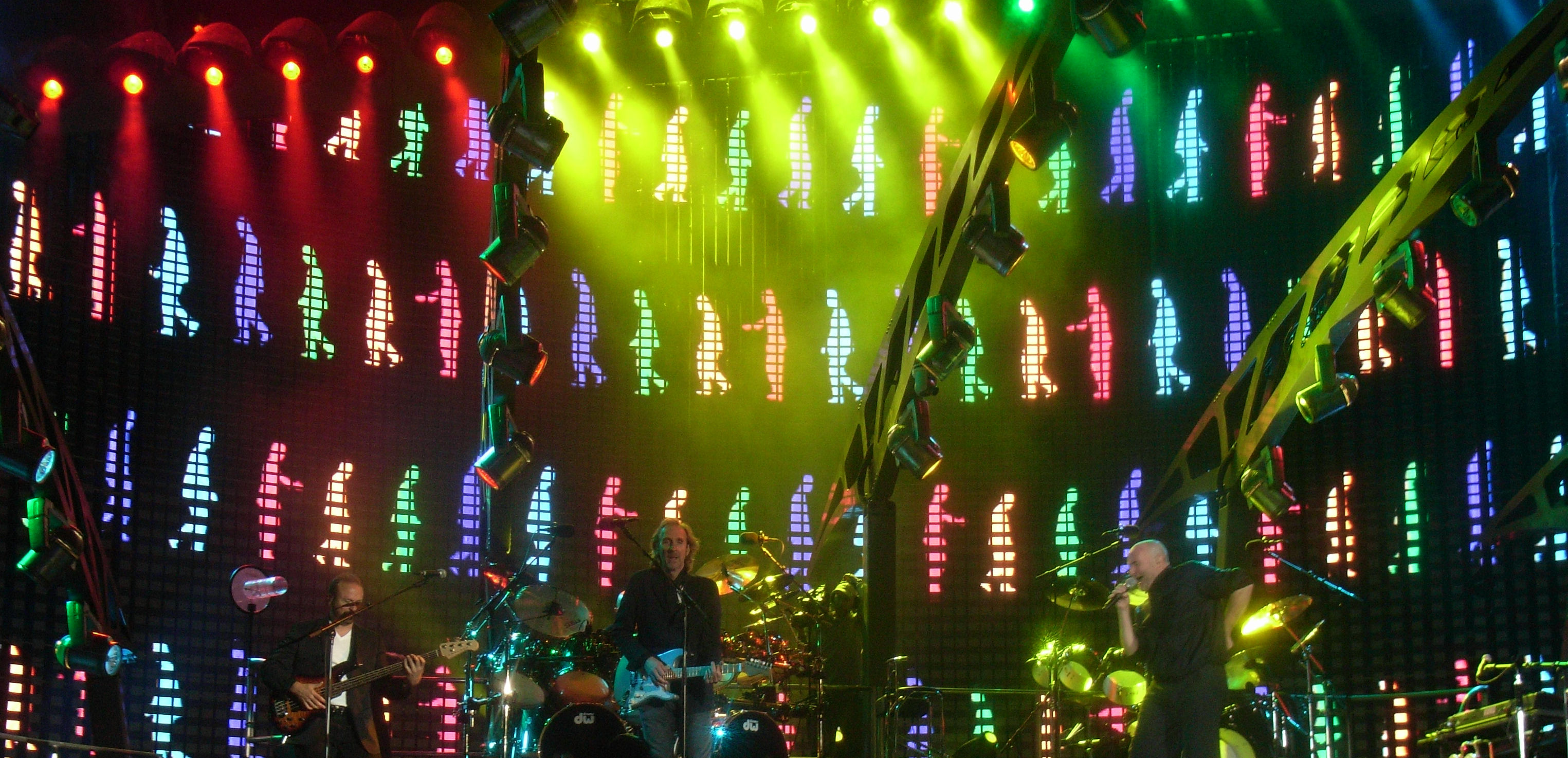
A sample of the multi-million pound video screen/light show during "I Can't Dance".

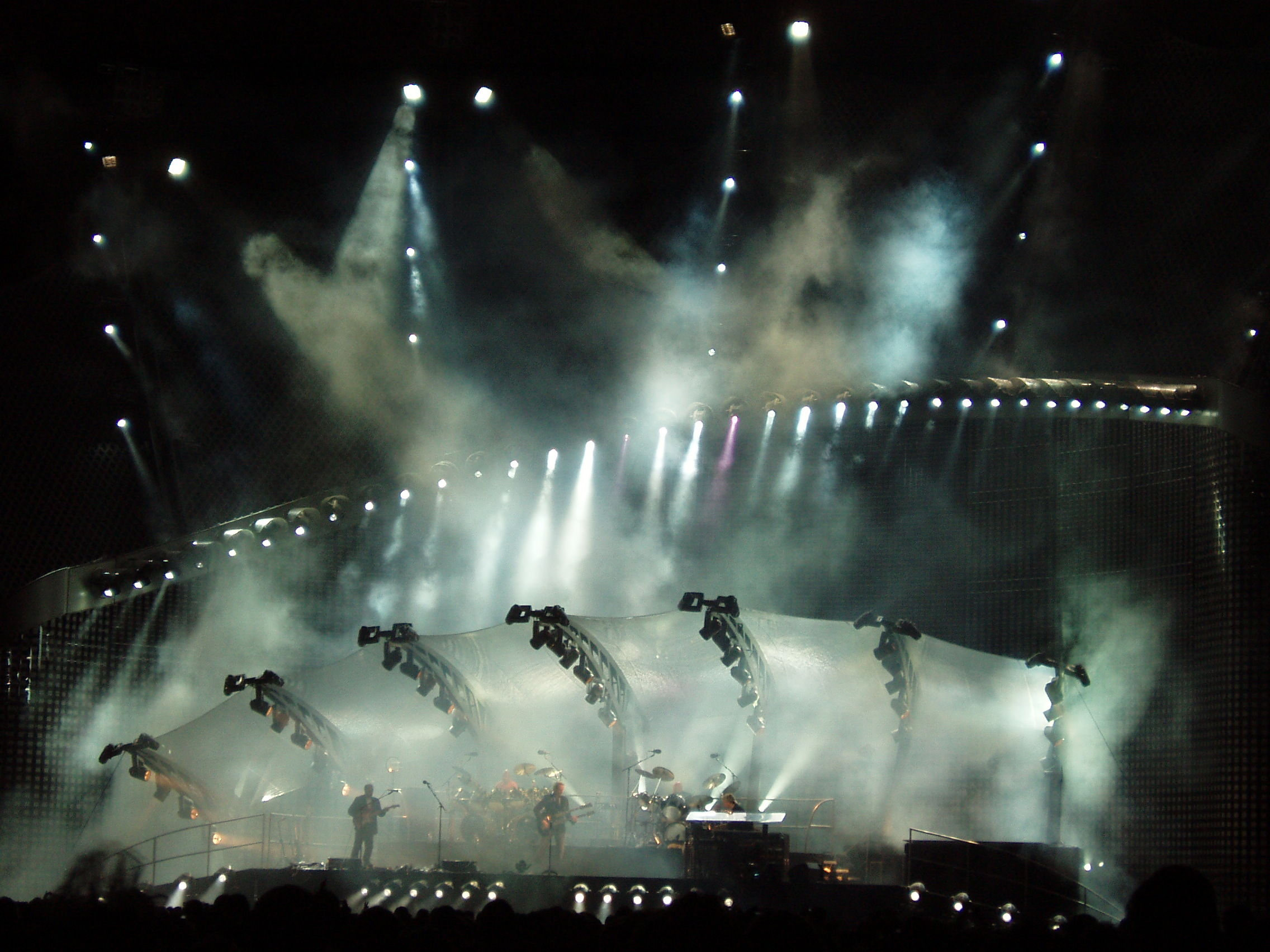
Genesis playing "Los Endos" at London, England.

During the initial London press conference, it was revealed that music dating back as far as 1973 would be performed on the tour, with the songs "Domino", "Afterglow", "In the Cage" and "Los Endos" cited as probable inclusions in the set. Rehearsal footage screened at the conference also showed the band working on "No Son of Mine" and "Home by the Sea". It was confirmed that no material from the post-Collins album Calling All Stations would be performed, and that the group were not planning on playing their 1972 epic "Supper's Ready". It later evolved that a small piece of "Stagnation", from the pre-Collins album Trespass would be included as part of the "Firth of Fifth/I Know What I Like" medley (as it has been since their 1977 tour).

Further details were uncovered whilst Genesis were rehearsing in Cossonay, Switzerland, throughout April and May 2007, when fan recordings began surfacing on the internet. These recordings revealed the band to be working on a number of older songs, including "Behind the Lines", "I Know What I Like (In Your Wardrobe)", "The Carpet Crawlers" and "Follow You Follow Me", as well as latter-day singles "Invisible Touch", "I Can't Dance" and "Throwing It All Away".

In an interview with Tony Banks and Mike Rutherford, it was confirmed that both "Jesus He Knows Me" from We Can't Dance and "Abacab" from Abacab were rehearsed though neither song was performed.

The complete set list was revealed following production rehearsals in Brussels, Belgium. This set remained unchanged throughout the European leg of the tour:

Main set

1. "Duke's Intro" ("Behind the Lines/"Duke's End")
2. "Turn It On Again"
3. "No Son of Mine"
4. "Land of Confusion"
5. Medley: "In the Cage" / "The Cinema Show" (instrumental section only) / "Duke's Travels" / "Afterglow"
6. "Hold on My Heart"
7. "Home by the Sea"/"Second Home by the Sea"
8. "Follow You, Follow Me"
9. "Firth of Fifth" (instrumental section only)
10. "I Know What I Like (In Your Wardrobe)"
11. "Mama"
12. "Ripples..."
13. "Throwing It All Away"
14. "Domino"
15. "Conversations with 2 Stools" (drum duet)
16. "Los Endos"
17. "Tonight, Tonight, Tonight" (truncated version)
18. "Invisible Touch"

Encore

1. "I Can't Dance"
2. "The Carpet Crawlers"

An identical setlist was performed on the North American leg of the tour, with the band's producer, Nick Davis, stating that no changes are planned. Tony Banks had earlier cited "In Too Deep" from Invisible Touch as a likely addition to the North American set, possibly at the expense of "Ripples" from A Trick of the Tail, but that change was not made. The only exception to the setlist was on 12 October at the Hollywood Bowl, where the last two songs had to be dropped due to the heavy rain causing problems with Tony Banks's keyboards.

At the beginning of the drum duet Thompson and Collins begin drumming either side of two barstools. This idea evolved from when Collins was interviewed during the Way We Walk tour about how the duets are constructed. He said: "A lot of the patterns evolve through the tour, so the duet at the end of the tour is much longer than the one at the beginning. But initially me and Chester sit either side of a chair and drum out beats until something sticks."

== Personnel ==
Genesis

- Tony Banks – keyboards, moog taurus, backing vocals, sound effects
- Mike Rutherford – guitar, bass, bass pedals, backing vocals
- Phil Collins – lead vocals, drums, percussion

Additional musicians

- Daryl Stuermer – bass, guitar, backing vocals
- Chester Thompson – drums, percussion

== Tour dates ==
List of 2007 concerts
Date	City	Country	Venue	Tickets sold / Available	Revenue
11 June 2007	Helsinki	Finland	Helsinki Olympic Stadium	32,237 / 40,000	$3,007,407
14 June 2007	Herning	Denmark	MCH Outdoor Arena	35,785 / 35,785	$4,774,616
15 June 2007	Hamburg	Germany	AOL Arena	45,835 / 45,835	$3,629,362
17 June 2007	Bern	Switzerland	Stade de Suisse	39,641 / 39,641	$3,737,259
19 June 2007	Linz	Austria	Gugl Stadium	23,392 / 28,000	$2,032,056
20 June 2007	Prague	Czech Republic	O_{2} Arena Carpark	18,881 / 23,000	$1,458,295
21 June 2007	Chorzów	Poland	Silesian Stadium	33,088 / 45,000	$1,462,965
23 June 2007	Hanover	Germany	AWD-Arena	48,908 / 48,908	$4,061,881
24 June 2007	Brussels	Belgium	King Baudouin Stadium	30,736 / 45,000	$3,308,361
26 June 2007	Düsseldorf	Germany	LTU Arena	88,397 / 88,397	$7,387,928
27 June 2007	Düsseldorf	Germany	LTU Arena	88,397 / 88,397	$7,387,928
28 June 2007	Stuttgart	Germany	Gottlieb-Daimler-Stadion	50,736 / 50,736	$4,208,021
30 June 2007	Paris	France	Parc des Princes	49,606 / 49,606	$4,593,809
1 July 2007	Amsterdam	Netherlands	Amsterdam Arena	52,622 / 52,622	$3,819,127
3 July 2007	Berlin	Germany	Olympiastadion	57,434 / 65,000	$5,071,146
4 July 2007	Leipzig	Germany	Zentralstadion	46,676 / 46,676	$4,009,938
5 July 2007	Frankfurt	Germany	Commerzbank-Arena	44,040 / 44,040	$3,610,047
7 July 2007	London	England	Wembley Stadium (Note: Part of Live Earth)	—N/a	—N/a
7 July 2007	Manchester	England	Old Trafford	45,066 / 45,066	$5,659,310
8 July 2007	London	England	Twickenham Stadium	54,279 / 54,279	$6,860,806
10 July 2007	Munich	Germany	Olympiastadion	68,951 / 68,951	$6,030,676
12 July 2007	Lyon	France	Stade de Gerland	30,830 / 40,000	$2,736,643
14 July 2007	Rome	Italy	Circus Maximus	500,000	-
7 September 2007	Toronto	Canada	BMO Field	22,963 / 23,593	$3,125,482
8 September 2007	Buffalo	United States	HSBC Arena	N/A	N/A
9 September 2007	Pittsburgh	United States	Mellon Arena	N/A	N/A
11 September 2007	Boston	United States	TD Banknorth Garden	12,400 / 12,400	$1,820,625
12 September 2007	Albany	United States	Times Union Center	N/A	N/A
14 September 2007	Montreal	Canada	Olympic Stadium	39,737 / 43,370	$5,331,114
15 September 2007	Ottawa	Canada	Scotiabank Place	12,137 / 12,137	$1,572,429
16 September 2007	Hartford	United States	Hartford Civic Center	11,172 / 11,172	$1,591,399
18 September 2007	Philadelphia	United States	Wachovia Center	36,007 / 38,634	$4,965,949
19 September 2007	Philadelphia	United States	Wachovia Center	36,007 / 38,634	$4,965,949
20 September 2007	Philadelphia	United States	Wachovia Center	36,007 / 38,634	$4,965,949
22 September 2007	Columbus	United States	Nationwide Arena	13,181 / 13,181	$1,589,095
23 September 2007	Washington, D.C.	United States	Verizon Center	13,198 / 13,198	$1,882,260
25 September 2007	New York City	United States	Madison Square Garden	12,752 / 12,752	$2,127,449
27 September 2007	East Rutherford	United States	Giants Stadium	38,019 / 43,726	$4,694,338
29 September 2007	Cleveland	United States	Quicken Loans Arena	13,944 / 13,944	$1,648,332
30 September 2007	Auburn Hills	United States	The Palace of Auburn Hills	N/A	N/A
2 October 2007	Chicago	United States	United Center	37,221 / 42,276	$5,070,887
3 October 2007	Chicago	United States	United Center	37,221 / 42,276	$5,070,887
4 October 2007	Chicago	United States	United Center	37,221 / 42,276	$5,070,887
6 October 2007	Denver	United States	Pepsi Center	N/A	N/A
9 October 2007	San Jose	United States	HP Pavilion at San Jose	11,578 / 12,567	$1,728,525
10 October 2007	Sacramento	United States	ARCO Arena	N/A	N/A
12 October 2007	Los Angeles	United States	Hollywood Bowl	31,757 / 33,824	$3,947,389
13 October 2007	Los Angeles	United States	Hollywood Bowl	31,757 / 33,824	$3,947,389
TOTAL				1,202,756 / 1,283,316 (94%)	$122,554,926
