= God Has Failed =

Studio album by RPWL
- Released: 11 September 2000
- Recorded: Metalworks Studios
- Genre: Progressive rock
- Length: 61:54
- Label: Tempus Fugit
- Producer: Yogi Lang; Karlheinz Wallner

RPWL chronology
God Has Failed (2000)	Trying to Kiss the Sun (2001)

Professional ratings
Review scores
Source	Rating
ProgressiveWorld.net	Read

God Has Failed is the debut studio album by German progressive rock band RPWL, released in 2000.

== Track listing ==
1. Hole in the Sky (8:22)
  - Part 1: Fly
  - Part 2: Crawl to You
2. Who Do You Think We Are (4:15)
3. Wait Five Years (3:00)
4. What I Need (1:56)
  - Part 1: Leaving
5. What I Need (5:19)
  - Part 2: What I Need
6. In Your Dreams (6:47)
7. It's Alright (5:21)
8. Crazy Lane (4:43)
9. Fool (5:27)
10. Hole in the Sky (2:39)
  - Part 3: The Promise
11. Spring of Freedom (5:52)
12. Farewell (5:50)
13. God Has Failed (2:16)

== Personnel ==
- Yogi Lang – vocals, keyboards
- Karlheinz Wallner – guitars
- Chris Postl – bass
- Phil Paul Rissettio – drums

== Production ==
- Produced by Lang and Wallner
- Recorded and mixed at Farmlands
- Cover design by Stefan Wittmann
- Photos by Birgit Bittermann
