= Live over Europe 2007 =

Live album by Genesis
- Released: 20 November 2007
- Recorded: June–July 2007
- Genre: Progressive rock; pop rock
- Length: 139:06
- Label: Virgin, Atlantic
- Producer: Nick Davis

Genesis chronology
Genesis 1983–1998 (2007)	Live over Europe 2007 (2007)	Genesis 1970–1975 (2008)

Professional ratings
Review scores
Source	Rating
Allmusic	2/5 stars

Live over Europe 2007 is the sixth live album by the British band Genesis. It was recorded during the Turn It On Again: The Tour of 2007. It was released in North America by Atlantic Records on 20 November 2007, and in Europe by Virgin Records on 26 November 2007 and serves as the companion to the When in Rome 2007 DVD. It was not included in the Genesis Live 1973-2007 box set, but could be fitted into a gap in the set.

== Recording ==
Reunited for the first time in 15 years, it was titled Turn It On Again: The Tour. Phil indicated that his hearing was not as good as it was. Venues included Manchester and Twickenham, UK; Hanover and Dusseldorf, Germany; Rome, Italy; Helsinki, Finland; Amsterdam, Netherlands; Paris, France; and Prague, Czech Republic.

== Track listing ==
=== Disc 1 ===
No.	Title	Location	Length
1.	"Duke's Intro (Behind the Lines/Duke's End)"	Manchester, UK	3:48
2.	"Turn It On Again"	Amsterdam, Netherlands	4:26
3.	"No Son of Mine"	Amsterdam, Netherlands	6:57
4.	"Land of Confusion"	Helsinki, Finland	5:11
5.	"In the Cage/The Cinema Show/Duke's Travels"	Manchester, UK	13:30
6.	"Afterglow"	Manchester, UK	4:27
7.	"Hold on My Heart"	Hanover, Germany	5:58
8.	"Home by the Sea/Second Home by the Sea"	Dusseldorf, Germany, and Rome, Italy	11:58
9.	"Follow You Follow Me"	Paris, France	4:19
10.	"Firth of Fifth [excerpt]"	Manchester, UK	4:39
11.	"I Know What I Like (In Your Wardrobe)"	Manchester, UK	6:45

=== Disc 2 ===
No.	Title	Location	Length
1.	"Mama"	Frankfurt, Germany	6:57
2.	"Ripples..."	Prague, Czech Republic	7:57
3.	"Throwing It All Away"	Paris, France	6:01
4.	"Domino": I. "In the Glow of the Night"; II. "The Last Domino"	Rome, Italy	11:34; 4:16; 7:18
5.	"Conversations with 2 Stools"	Munich, Germany	6:48
6.	"Los Endos"	Twickenham, UK	6:24
7.	"Tonight, Tonight, Tonight [excerpt]"	Rome, Italy	3:49
8.	"Invisible Touch"	Rome, Italy	5:35
9.	"I Can't Dance"	Munich, Germany	6:11
10.	"The Carpet Crawlers"	Manchester, UK	6:00

== Personnel ==
- Phil Collins – lead vocals, drums, percussion, stool
- Mike Rutherford – 6 and 12-string guitars, bass, bass pedals, backing vocals
- Tony Banks – keyboards, backing vocals

with

- Daryl Stuermer – guitars, bass, bass pedals, backing vocals
- Chester Thompson – drums, percussion, stool

== Charts ==
=== Weekly charts ===
Chart performance for Live over Europe 2007
Chart (2007–2015)	Peak position
Argentine Albums (CAPIF)	17
Austrian Albums (Ö3 Austria)	47
Belgian Albums (Ultratop Wallonia)	57
Dutch Albums (Album Top 100)	70
French Albums (SNEP)	93
German Albums (Offizielle Top 100)	1
Italian Albums (FIMI)	47
Scottish Albums (OCC)	63
Swiss Albums (Schweizer Hitparade)	62
UK Albums (OCC)	51
UK Album Downloads (OCC)	21
UK Physical Albums (OCC)	51

=== Year-end charts ===
Year-end chart performance for Live over Europe 2007
Chart (2008)	Position
German Albums (Offizielle Top 100)	31

== Certifications ==
Certifications for Live over Europe 2007
Region	Certification	Certified units/sales
Germany (BVMI)	Gold	100,000^{^}
United Kingdom (BPI)	Silver	60,000^{^}
^{^} Shipments figures based on certification alone.

== See also ==
- The Turn It On Again Reunion Tour
- "When in Rome 2007"
