= Calling All Stations =

Studio album by Genesis
- Released: 1 September 1997
- Recorded: January–June 1997
- Studios: The Farm (Chiddingfold, Surrey)
- Genres: Alternative rock; pop rock; art rock
- Length: 67:42
- Labels: Virgin; Atlantic
- Producers: Nick Davis; Tony Banks; Mike Rutherford

Genesis chronology
| The Way We Walk, Volume Two: The Longs (1993) | Calling All Stations (1997) | Genesis Archive 1967–75 (1998) |

Singles from Calling All Stations
- 1. "Congo" Released: 15 September 1997; 2. "Shipwrecked" Released: 1 December 1997; 3. "Not About Us" Released: 23 February 1998

Calling All Stations (stylised ...Calling All Stations...) is the fifteenth and final studio album by the English rock band Genesis. It was released on 1 September 1997 by Virgin Records and is their only album featuring Scottish singer Ray Wilson as frontman following the departure of long-term drummer/singer Phil Collins in 1996, making it their only album since Trespass not to involve Collins. The remaining members—founding keyboardist Tony Banks and guitarist/bassist Mike Rutherford—decided to continue the band and write new music for an album, during which they auditioned singers and chose Wilson.

Calling All Stations was released to mostly negative reviews from music critics who chastised its lack of direction but praised Wilson's performance. It sold poorly in comparison to their earlier albums, reaching No. 2 in the UK and performing well in Europe, but it peaked at No. 54 in the US. This marked their first studio album not to reach number one in the UK since 1978. "Congo", the first of three singles from the album, went to No. 29 in the UK. The Calling All Stations Tour saw Genesis tour Europe throughout 1998 but an American leg was booked and cancelled twice due to low ticket sales. The group disbanded at the tour's conclusion, but later reunited with Collins for the Turn It On Again and The Last Domino? Tours with Collins as lead singer again.

== Background ==
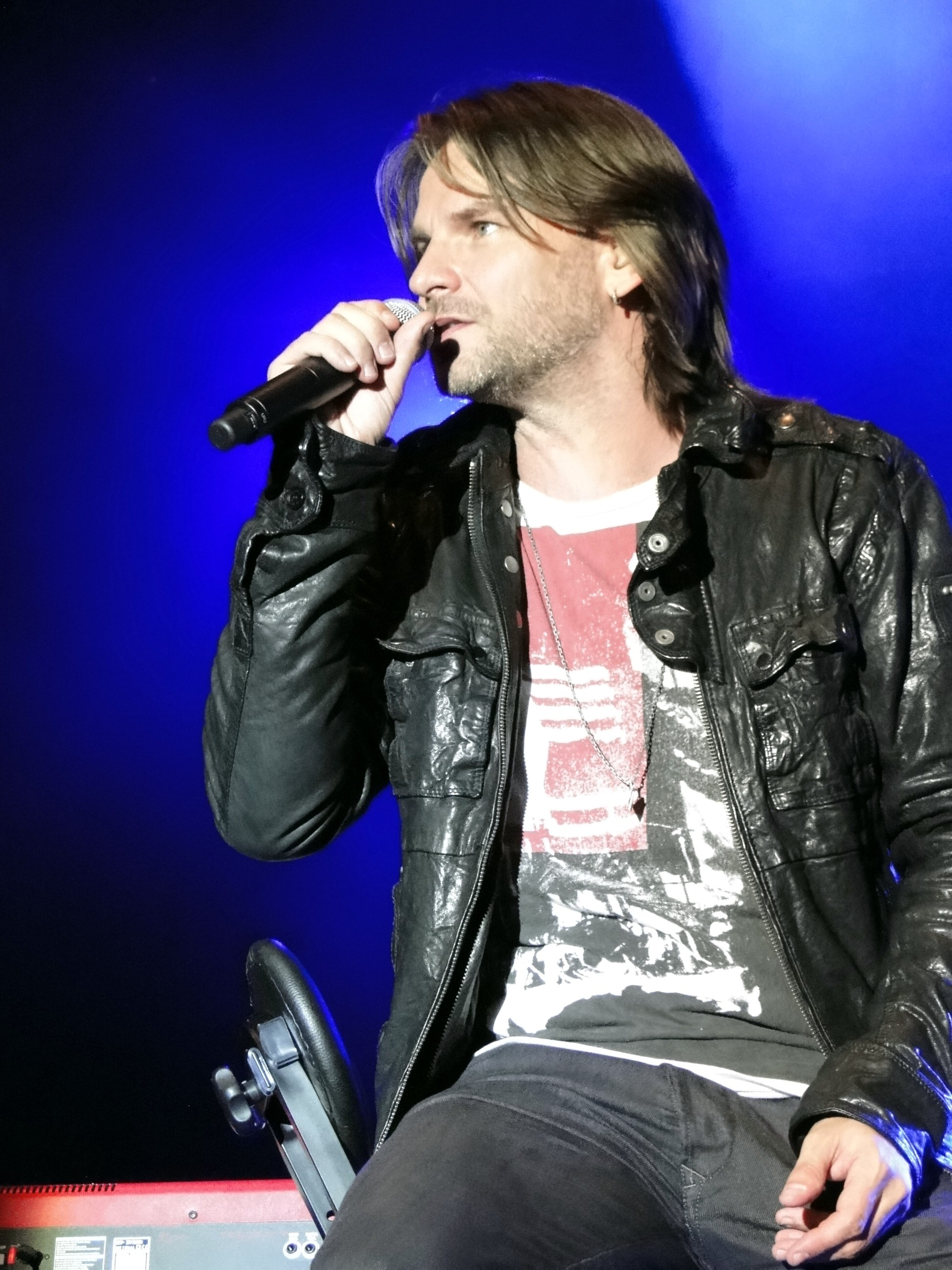
Stiltskin guitarist and vocalist Ray Wilson (pictured in 2010) became Genesis's third frontman following the departure of Phil Collins.

At the end of the We Can't Dance Tour in November 1992 the band went on hiatus, reuniting only for a one-off charity performance in September 1993. Their drummer and lead vocalist Phil Collins resumed his solo career and released Both Sides, keyboardist Tony Banks recorded an album with Jack Hues under the Strictly Inc. project, and guitarist/bassist Mike Rutherford continued his band Mike and the Mechanics. In mid-1994, Collins said that singing Genesis songs at the charity gig after making Both Sides, which he deemed a highly personal album, was uncomfortable. "For the first time I felt like an actor playing somebody else's part." After a band meeting with manager Tony Smith in the summer of 1995, Collins left. A press release from management announcing the news was released in March 1996.

Banks and Rutherford decided they had nothing to lose and started to write new songs in January 1996 to see if it was worth carrying on with Genesis. After some ideas had been put down they were pleased with the results and began to audition lead singers. At this stage, the basic structure of the tracks on Calling All Stations had been written but the lyrics had not been worked on. Shortly after the album's release, Wilson described the material as a mixture of their earlier progressive rock sound and their later, more commercial period.

The final two candidates were English singer David Longdon, later a member of Big Big Train, and Scottish singer and guitarist Ray Wilson of the grunge-influenced band Stiltskin. Longdon's song "Hieroglyphics of Love" attracted producer Nick Davis who forwarded it onto Banks and Rutherford and liked it enough to invite him to the studio to audition. Banks had liked Wilson's vocals from listening to Stiltskin's first album, The Mind's Eye (1994). For his first audition, Wilson sang Genesis songs with Collins's vocals removed. At his second, he was asked to contribute vocal ideas to the new music that Banks and Rutherford had written, singing and humming ideas on the spot. Takes from this session were used by Banks to shape the verses to "There Must Be Some Other Way". In November 1996, Banks and Rutherford chose Wilson as the new lead singer. Longdon said Rutherford phoned him with the news while Banks sent him a Christmas card with "a lengthy message inside." Wilson's arrival into the band was made public on 6 June 1997.

== Recording ==
Calling All Stations features Israeli session drummer Nir Zidkyahu and American drummer Nick D'Virgilio of the prog rock band Spock's Beard. Chester Thompson, who had previously served as a touring drummer for Genesis, approached Rutherford about participating, but Rutherford declined his offer. The album was recorded using RADAR, a type of non-linear digital audio recording software capable of simultaneously recording 24-tracks onto computer hard drives.

Wilson said he had a "pretty small" amount of input into the album. He recalled having free rein with his vocals on Rutherford's songs because he "doesn't know what he wants until he hears it", whereas Banks had worked out firm ideas from the beginning.

== Songs ==
"Calling All Stations" is the first track Banks and Rutherford wrote for the album and most of the original takes were retained for the recorded version. It was used as the opener because of its heavier rock sound and dramatic mood. The song's arrangement underwent several changes as Banks and Rutherford had Wilson sing various melody lines to see what his voice was capable of, resulting in a stronger track overall. Wilson picked "Calling All Stations" as his favourite song from the album.

The lyrics to "Small Talk" were written by Wilson. The B-side "Anything Now" was considered one of the strongest tracks from the recording sessions but was not included on the album, as Banks believed "we couldn't quite get Ray to sing it right."

== Release ==
The album was launched in Europe on 26 August 1997 with a live press conference, interview, and acoustic performance on German television and VH1 from the Television Tower in Berlin. Two days later, the North American launch event with a live interview and acoustic performance took place at the Kennedy Space Center in Florida, broadcast as a nationwide radio special.

Calling All Stations peaked at No. 2 in the UK, making it the first Genesis studio album not to reach the top spot since ...And Then There Were Three... (1978). It was also their first album not to produce a Top 20 single in the UK since Wind & Wuthering (1976). It failed to make an impact in the US chart with a peak at No. 54 on the Billboard 200. This made Calling All Stations the first Genesis album since Selling England by the Pound (1973) to not crack its top 50. It also became their first album since A Trick of the Tail (1976) to not produce a charting single in the US.

A Super Audio CD/DVD set with new stereo and 5.1 surround sound mixes was released in September 2007. A CD/DVD set was released in North America in November 2007.

== Critical reception ==
Professional ratings
Review scores
| Source | Rating |
|---|---|
| AllMusic | 1.5/5 stars |
| Blender | 1/5 stars |
| Chicago Tribune | 0.5/4 stars |
| Entertainment Weekly | C− |
| NME | 1/10 stars |
| Rolling Stone | 2/5 stars |
| The Rolling Stone Album Guide | 2.5/5 stars |

Steve Knopper reviewed the album in the Chicago Tribune, calling it "a formless blob of synth sounds" and asserting that new singer Ray Wilson has "no confidence or personality, let alone the vision to stave off his bandmates' meandering ideas." Both AllMusic and Rolling Stone commented that Ray Wilson was a fitting vocal replacement for Collins, but thought that the album was generally lacking in good material. AllMusic picked "Calling All Stations", "Congo", and "Not About Us" as the album's stronger tracks, while Rolling Stone described "Shipwrecked" and "Not About Us" as "pleasant if generic FM-rock tunes." Both also commented on the album's odd mix of art rock and pop, believing that it failed to gel into a coherent style; Rolling Stone summarised it as "a Mike and the Mechanics artrock album". In 2014, Stevie Chick of The Guardian dismissed the album as "inexplicable". Tom Cox wrote in the NME that it was "tantamount to a service station muzak rock opera.

In a 2019 interview, Tony Banks thought the album contained "some very good songs," but "has a kind of uniformity about it that I regret. It contains one or two rather weak tracks, too. We also left off two of the strongest tracks, which was a mistake." Rutherford said he did not regret making Calling All Stations, but due to its sales being lower than that of previous Genesis albums, he had "sensed that the mood had changed in terms of radio play." As he thought Genesis was already "becoming a catalogue act," this influenced the band's decision to stop recording new material.

== Tour and aftermath ==
Genesis supported the album with a 47-date European tour from 29 January to 31 May 1998, featuring shows in large arenas throughout Europe. The core trio were joined by Zidkyahu on drums, percussion, and backing vocals and Irish musician Anthony Drennan on guitar and bass. Former touring members Daryl Stuermer and Chester Thompson were initially approached, but Stuermer was already working with Collins, and Thompson refused to join after his request for full-fledged band membership was denied. Rehearsals took place at Bray Film Studios in Windsor and the Working Men's Club in Chiddingfold, close to the band's recording studio. The tour concluded with spots at the Rock am Ring and Rock im Park Festival in Germany. A majority of the older songs were transposed in a lower key to accommodate Wilson's lower vocal range. Midway through the set included an acoustic medley of songs from their 1970s output. The tour was captured live on several radio broadcasts; two songs from the NEC Arena ("Not About Us" and a ten-minute version of "The Dividing Line") were officially released in 2023 on BBC Broadcasts. Also, the "Not About Us" single included three acoustic performances from an early radio show at RTL Studios in Paris, 1997.

A 27-date North American tour in large arenas was booked to start in November 1997, but it was cancelled due to insufficient ticket sales. A revised 22-date tour in smaller venues was arranged, but that too was cancelled. At the European tour's conclusion, Genesis went on hiatus until Collins returned for their 2007 Turn It On Again Tour.

== Track listing ==
All songs written by Tony Banks and Mike Rutherford, except where noted.

| No. | Title | Writer(s) | Length |
|---|---|---|---|
| 1. | "Calling All Stations" | | 5:43 |
| 2. | "Congo" | | 4:51 |
| 3. | "Shipwrecked" | | 4:23 |
| 4. | "Alien Afternoon" | | 7:51 |
| 5. | "Not About Us" | Banks; Rutherford; Ray Wilson | 4:38 |
| 6. | "If That's What You Need" | | 5:12 |
| 7. | "The Dividing Line" | | 7:45 |
| 8. | "Uncertain Weather" | | 5:29 |
| 9. | "Small Talk" | Banks; Rutherford; Wilson | 5:02 |
| 10. | "There Must Be Some Other Way" | Banks; Rutherford; Wilson | 7:54 |
| 11. | "One Man's Fool" | | 8:58 |
| Total length: | | | 67:42 |

- Note: The CD liner notes state that track 7, "The Dividing Line", is 8:59.

== B-sides ==
"Papa He Said" and "Banjo Man" are from the single "Congo". Instrumental tracks "Phret" and "7/8" are from the single "Shipwrecked". "Anything Now", "Sign Your Life Away" and "Run Out of Time" are from the single "Not About Us". All tracks are Banks/Rutherford compositions, except "Banjo Man" which is by Banks/Rutherford/Wilson. "Nowhere Else to Turn" is an unreleased track from the sessions that only appeared on a promotional CD.

== Personnel ==
Credits adapted from the album's liner notes.

Genesis

- Tony Banks – keyboards, acoustic guitar, backing vocals
- Mike Rutherford – guitars, bass, backing vocals
- Ray Wilson – lead vocals

Additional musicians

- Nick D'Virgilio – drums on "Alien Afternoon" (first half), "If That's What You Need", "Uncertain Weather", and "Small Talk", percussion
- Nir Zidkyahu – drums on "Alien Afternoon" (second half) and all other songs, percussion

Production

- Tony Banks – producer
- Mike Rutherford – producer
- Nick Davis – producer, engineer
- Ian Huffam – assistant engineer
- Recorded at The Farm, Surrey, England
- Geoff Callingham – technical assistance
- Mike Bowen – technical assistance
- Dale Newman – general assistance
- Wherefore ART? – sleeve design
- Kevin Westernberg – photography
- Peter Robathan – photography

== Charts ==
=== Weekly charts ===
| Chart (1997–1998) | Peak position |
|---|---|
| Austrian Albums (Ö3 Austria) | 6 |
| Belgian Albums (Ultratop Flanders) | 30 |
| Belgian Albums (Ultratop Wallonia) | 13 |
| Canada Top Albums/CDs (RPM) | 29 |
| Czech Albums (IFPI) | 6 |
| Dutch Albums (Album Top 100) | 9 |
| European Albums (IFPI) | 2 |
| Finnish Albums (Suomen virallinen lista) | 19 |
| French Albums (SNEP) | 5 |
| German Albums (Offizielle Top 100) | 2 |
| Greek Albums (IFPI) | 17 |
| Hungarian Albums (MAHASZ) | 33 |
| Italian Albums (FIMI) | 7 |
| Norwegian Albums (VG-lista) | 2 |
| Portuguese Albums (AFP) | 20 |
| Scottish Albums (Official Charts) | 7 |
| Spanish Albums (AFYVE) | 8 |
| Swedish Albums (Sverigetopplistan) | 11 |
| Swiss Albums (Schweizer Hitparade) | 3 |
| UK Albums (Official Charts) | 2 |
| US Billboard 200 | 54 |

=== Year-end charts ===
| Chart (1997) | Position |
|---|---|
| Austrian Albums (Ö3 Austria) | 73 |
| European Albums (IFPI) | 61 |
| German Albums (Offizielle Top 100) | 33 |
| Norwegian Albums (VG-lista) | 77 |
| Spanish Albums (AFYVE) | 97 |
| Swiss Albums (Schweizer Hitparade) | 57 |

== Certifications ==
| Region | Certification | Certified units/sales |
|---|---|---|
| Canada | — | 20,000 |
| France (SNEP) | Gold | 100,000^{*} |
| Germany (BVMI) | Gold | 250,000^{^} |
| Italy (FIMI) | Gold | 50,000^{*} |
| Poland (ZPAV) | Gold | 50,000^{*} |
| Spain (Promusicae) | Gold | 50,000^{^} |
| Switzerland (IFPI Switzerland) | Gold | 25,000^{^} |
| United Kingdom (BPI) | Gold | 100,000^{^} |
| United States | — | 110,000 |
^{*} Sales figures based on certification alone.^{^} Shipments figures based on certification alone.

== Release history ==
| Region | Date |
|---|---|
| United Kingdom | 1 September 1997 |
| United States | 2 September 1997 |
