= Inside (Stiltskin song) =

1994 single by Stiltskin

Single by Stiltskin

from the album The Mind's Eye
- B-side: "America"
- Released: 25 April 1994
- Genre: Post-grunge
- Length: 5:11 (album version); 4:24 (edit)
- Label: White Water
- Songwriter: Peter Lawlor
- Producer: Peter Lawlor

Stiltskin singles chronology
"Inside" (1994)	"Footsteps" (1994)

"Inside" is a song by Scottish rock band Stiltskin, the first single from their first studio album, The Mind's Eye (1994). It was written by Peter Lawlor for the British Levi's advert "Creek". "Inside" is a post-grunge song with lyrics about escaping oppression and based around Plato's allegory of the cave. All instruments on the recording were played by Peter Lawlor, and lead vocals were provided by Ray Wilson, who would become the new Genesis singer after the departure of Phil Collins. The introductory chorus is sung by the Ambrosian Singers.

"Inside" was released as a single on 25 April 1994 and spent one week at number one on the UK Singles Chart the following month, becoming the fourth song to top the listing following use in a Levi's advert. It was also a worldwide hit, reaching the top 10 in more than 10 European countries and finding moderate success in Australia, New Zealand, and the United States. The song was used as the music for Sky Sports' coverage of the Scottish Premier League between 1998 and 2002.

== Background and composition ==
In 1994, Levi Strauss & Co. hired musician Peter Lawlor to create an original song that they would use in a forthcoming television advertisement for the company's 501 Jeans. Lawlor needed a vocalist, so after several auditions, he hired Stilskin's eventual lead singer, Ray Wilson. Wilson sang on the track while Lawlor played all the instruments. In May 2019, Lawlor explained that he based the song's lyrics on the allegory of the cave, an allegory presented by Greek philosopher Plato. The lyrics also reference the trolley problem, particularly with the line "Fat man starts to fall". Overall, the song is about escaping oppression.

== Levi's advert ==
The black and white advert, titled "Creek" and directed by Vaughan Arnell, is set in America during the late 1800s and features an Amish family having a picnic in Yosemite National Park. Later, the family's two daughters run into a nearby forest, where they discover a lake with a toned man washing himself. One of the daughters finds a pair of trousers on the bank, and assuming it to be the man's, the two watch as he emerges from the lake, but he is wearing a pair of Levi's 501 Shrink to Fit Jeans. Puzzled, the girls look around and notice an elderly man swim into sight. Realising the ordinary jeans belong to the old man, they run off and watch from behind a tree as the Levi's Jeans owner, fully clothed, walks to his horse. The ad ends with the message, "In 1873, Levi's Jeans only came shrink-to-fit".

The advert was highly praised. James Murphy, co-founder of adam&eveDDB, said that while it was not the funniest, coolest, nor sexiest Levi's advert, its qualities work together to create "perfection in the art of selling." Bartle Bogle Hegarty founders John Hegarty and Nigel Bogle consider the ad "perfect" and one of their favourites, with Hegarty deeming it "impossible to improve" and calling the "anachronistic" riff of "Inside" a superb compliment to the clip. In the wake of the ad's positive reception, Lawlor decided to form the band Stiltskin, recruiting drummer Ross McFarlane and bassist James Finnigan, and release "Inside" as a single.

== Release and reception ==
"Inside" was released as a single on 25 April 1994 in the United Kingdom. It debuted at number five on the UK Singles Chart six days later, then jumped to number one on 8 May, where it stayed for a single week. It was the fourth song from a Levi's advert to top the UK chart, after Ben E. King's "Stand by Me", Steve Miller Band's "The Joker", and the Clash's "Should I Stay or Should I Go". "Inside" went on to spend 11 more weeks in the top 100 and was the UK's 23rd-highest-selling single of 1994. The same year, it was awarded a silver disc from the British Phonographic Industry (BPI) for shipping over 200,000 units. In Ireland, the song peaked at number seven on the Irish Singles Chart. With its combined Irish and British sales, it achieved a peak of number six on the Eurochart Hot 100 on 21 May 1994.

In June and July 1994, the track began to garner commercial success in mainland Europe. In Austria, it rose to number two for two weeks, ending the year at number 29 on the country's year-end ranking. In Sweden, where it topped off at number four, it charted for 20 weeks, spending half of its chart life in the top 10. On Sverigetopplistan's year-end chart for 1994, the single appeared at number 24. "Inside" additionally reached the top five in Germany, Norway, and Switzerland. Elsewhere in Europe, the single entered the top 10 in Finland, France, Italy, and the Netherlands, while in Belgium, it reached number 23 on the Ultratop chart. It was Europe's 27th-best-selling hit of the year.

Outside Europe, the single charted within the top 40 in several countries the following year. In New Zealand, "Inside" debuted on the RIANZ Singles Chart at number 27 on 25 December 1994. Over the next seven weeks, the song gradually rose up the listing until peaking at number 20 during its eighth week in, on 5 March 1995. It quickly dropped out of the top 50, leaving the chart three weeks after peaking. In Australia, "Inside" was released on 5 December 1995 and debuted at No. 98 on the ARIA Singles Chart on 15 January 1995. The song eventually peaked at number 40 on 19 March 1995 and spent a total of six weeks in the top 50. It also found some popularity on mainstream rock radio in the United States, where it debuted and peaked at number 37 on the Billboard Album Rock Tracks chart in May 1995. Stiltskin did not obtain another significant hit, thus labelling them a one-hit wonder.

== Track listings ==
- UK 7-inch and cassette single

A. "Inside" – 4:23
B. "America" – 3:14

- UK CD single
1. "Inside" – 4:23
2. "America" – 3:14
3. "Inside" (extended) – 5:09
- European CD single
1. "Inside" – 4:23
2. "Inside" (extended) – 5:09

== Personnel ==
Credits are adapted from the UK 7-inch single liner notes.

Stiltskin

- Ray Wilson – vocals
- Peter Lawlor – all instruments
- James Finnigan
- Ross McFarlane

Others

- The Ambrosian Singers – choir
- Tessa – backing vocals
- Turner Duckworth – sleeve design
- D2 – sleeve layout

== Charts ==
=== Weekly charts ===
Chart (1994)	Peak position
Australia (ARIA)	40
Austria (Ö3 Austria Top 40)	2
Belgium (Ultratop 50 Flanders)	23
Europe (Eurochart Hot 100)	6
Europe (European Hit Radio)	28
Finland (Suomen virallinen lista)	7
France (SNEP)	9
Germany (GfK)	5
Ireland (IRMA)	7
Israel (Israeli Singles Chart)	26
Italy (Musica e dischi)	6
Netherlands (Dutch Top 40)	8
Netherlands (Single Top 100)	7
New Zealand (Recorded Music NZ)	20
Norway (VG-lista)	5
Scottish Singles Sales (Official Charts)	3
Sweden (Sverigetopplistan)	4
Switzerland (Schweizer Hitparade)	5
UK Singles (Official Charts)	1
UK Airplay (Music Week)	19
US Album Rock Tracks (Billboard)	37

=== Year-end charts ===
Chart (1994)	Position
Austria (Ö3 Austria Top 40)	29
Europe (Eurochart Hot 100)	27
France (SNEP)	31
Germany (Media Control)	36
Netherlands (Dutch Top 40)	74
Netherlands (Single Top 100)	71
Sweden (Topplistan)	24
Switzerland (Schweizer Hitparade)	18
UK Singles (OCC)	23

== Certifications ==
Region	Certification	Certified units/sales
United Kingdom (BPI)	Silver	200,000^{^}
^{^} Shipments figures based on certification alone.

== See also ==
- List of UK Singles Chart number ones of the 1990s
