= Shipwrecked (song) =

Single by Genesis

from the album Calling All Stations
- B-side: "Phret"; "7/8"; "No Son of Mine"; "Lover's Leap"; "Turn It On Again"
- Released: 1 December 1997
- Recorded: The Farm (Chiddingfold, Surrey)
- Genre: Rock
- Length: 4:23
- Label: Atlantic (US and Canada); Virgin (rest of the world)
- Songwriters: Tony Banks; Mike Rutherford
- Producers: Genesis; Nick Davis

Genesis singles chronology
"Congo" (1997)	"Shipwrecked" (1997)	"Not About Us" (1998)

"Shipwrecked" is a song by English rock band Genesis, released in December 1997 as the second single from their fifteenth album, Calling All Stations (1997). It was a minor hit, reaching No. 54 in the UK and No. 82 in Germany.

The song is classified as a break-up song. The song sings about someone who has recently broken up with his significant other, and now feels "shipwrecked", hopeless, and alone.

Some single versions featured acoustic versions of "No Son of Mine", "Lover's Leap", and "Turn It On Again" as B-sides.

== Track listings ==
=== CD single, part 1 ===
Virgin / gendx14

No.	Title	Length
1.	"Shipwrecked"	4:26
2.	"No Son of Mine" (acoustic version)	3:21
3.	"Lover's Leap (From Supper's Ready)" (acoustic version)	2:20
4.	"Turn It On Again" (acoustic version)	2:33

=== CD single, part 2 ===
Virgin / gensd14

No.	Title	Length
1.	"Shipwrecked"	4:26
2.	"Phret" (non-album track – instrumental)	4:05
3.	"7/8" (non-album track – instrumental)	5:08

=== Personnel ===
- Ray Wilson – lead vocals
- Tony Banks – keyboards, acoustic guitar, backing vocals
- Mike Rutherford – guitars, bass, backing vocals
- Nir Zidkyahu – drums, percussion
