= The Mind's Eye (album) =

Studio album by Stiltskin
- Released: 17 October 1994
- Studio: Water Music Studios, London; Abbey Road
- Genre: Post-grunge; alternative rock
- Length: 40:50 (EU and UK); 43:21 (US)
- Label: White Water (UK); East West (US)
- Producer: Peter Lawlor

Stiltskin chronology
The Mind's Eye (1994)	She (2006)

Singles from The Mind's Eye
- 1. "Inside" Released: 25 April 1994; 2. "Footsteps" Released: 12 September 1994; 3. "Rest in Peace" Released: 20 March 1995

Professional ratings
Review scores
Source	Rating
AllMusic	2/5 stars
Music Week	3/5 stars
Select	2/5 medals

The Mind's Eye, released 1994, is the debut studio album by the band Stiltskin. The album was driven by the success of the single "Inside", which reached number one in the UK. The follow-up single "Footsteps" reached number 34 in the UK.

It was the only album recorded by the original lineup of the band. The next album, She, would be released in 2006 with a new lineup that only retained lead vocalist Ray Wilson.

== Track listing ==
=== European and Australian edition ===
All tracks are written by Peter Lawlor.

No.	Title	Length
1.	"Intro" (instrumental)	0:36
2.	"Scared of Ghosts"	4:00
3.	"Horse"	4:23
4.	"Rest in Peace"	2:56
5.	"Footsteps"	3:55
6.	"Sunshine and Butterflies"	3:52
7.	"Inside"	5:13
8.	"An Illusion"	3:48
9.	"America"	3:17
10.	"When My Ship Comes In"	3:51
11.	"Prayer Before Birth" (instrumental)	4:39

=== US edition ===
All tracks are written by Peter Lawlor.

No.	Title	Length
1.	"Inside"	5:13
2.	"Sunshine and Butterflies"	3:52
3.	"Rest in Peace"	2:56
4.	"Footsteps"	3:55
5.	"When My Ship Comes In"	3:51
6.	"Horse"	4:23
7.	"An Illusion"	3:48
8.	"Scared of Ghosts"	4:00
9.	"Shouting In My Sleep"	3:07
10.	"Prayer Before Birth" (instrumental)	4:39
11.	"America"	3:17

== Personnel ==
Stiltskin

- Ray Wilson – vocals
- Peter Lawlor – acoustic and electric guitars, mandolin, backing vocals, bass on "Inside" and "An Illusion"
- James Finnigan – bass guitar, Hammond organ, Wurlitzer piano
- Ross McFarlane – drums, percussion

Additional personnel

- Sian Bell – cello
- Ambrosian Singers – choral opening
- Tessa Sturridge – backing vocals

Production

- Arranged by Peter Lawlor
- Produced, recorded and engineered by Peter Lawlor, assisted on some tracks by James Finnigan
- Mastered by Ted Jensen

== Charts ==
Chart performance for The Mind's Eye
Chart (1994–1995)	Peak position
Australian Albums (ARIA)	100
Austrian Albums (Ö3 Austria)	10
Dutch Albums (Album Top 100)	76
German Albums (Offizielle Top 100)	11
New Zealand Albums (RMNZ)	36
Swedish Albums (Sverigetopplistan)	13
Swiss Albums (Schweizer Hitparade)	13
UK Albums (OCC)	17
