= The Carpet Crawlers =

Song by Genesis

Single by Genesis

from the album The Lamb Lies Down on Broadway
- B-side: "The Waiting Room (Evil Jam)" (live)
- Released: 18 April 1975
- Recorded: August–October 1974
- Genre: Progressive rock
- Length: 5:15 (album version); 4:33 (single version)
- Label: Charisma/Phonogram (UK); Atco/Atlantic (US)
- Songwriters: Tony Banks, Phil Collins, Peter Gabriel, Steve Hackett, Mike Rutherford
- Producers: John Burns and Genesis

Genesis singles chronology
"Counting Out Time" (1974)	"The Carpet Crawlers" (1975)	"A Trick of the Tail" (1976)

"The Carpet Crawlers 1999"
- Cover for the 1999 re-recorded version.

Single by Genesis

from the album Turn It On Again: The Hits
- B-side: "Follow You, Follow Me"; "Turn It On Again"
- Released: 2 November 1999
- Length: 5:39
- Label: Virgin/Atlantic
- Songwriters: Tony Banks, Phil Collins, Peter Gabriel, Steve Hackett, Mike Rutherford
- Producer: Trevor Horn

Genesis singles chronology
"Not About Us" (1998)	"The Carpet Crawlers 1999" (1999)	"Silent Sun 2006" (2006)

"The Carpet Crawlers" is a song written and performed by the English progressive rock band Genesis, recorded for their sixth studio album The Lamb Lies Down on Broadway. The song tells the section of the album's story where Rael, the lead character, finds himself in a red carpeted corridor surrounded by kneeling people crawling towards a wooden door. Rael dashes by them towards the door and goes through it. Behind the door is a table with a candlelit feast on it, and behind that, a spiral staircase that leads upwards out of sight.

The complex symbolism of Peter Gabriel's lyrics has been interpreted as referring to the fertilisation journey or as describing a scene inspired by Gnosticism in which humanity is misled by the 'callers': instead of the promise of heaven, the carpet crawlers find death and rebirth to a hellish environment.

The song was released in April 1975 as the album's second single under the title "The Carpet Crawlers". The song has alternately been titled "Carpet Crawlers", "The Carpet Crawl", and "Carpet Crawl". (Note: The single worldwide and the US pressing lists the track as "The Carpet Crawlers". It was changed to "Carpet Crawlers" worldwide on the 1994 remaster. Before 1994 it was usually listed as "Carpet Crawl" outside the US. On Seconds Out it is listed as "The Carpet Crawl".) In 1999, Genesis re-recorded the song with producer Trevor Horn. Featuring Gabriel and Collins sharing lead vocals, this recording was released as "The Carpet Crawlers 1999". This marked the last time both singers recorded with Genesis.

== Background and writing ==
Genesis lead singer Peter Gabriel wrote the lyrics for "The Carpet Crawlers" first; bassist/guitarist Mike Rutherford and keyboardist Tony Banks then wrote a chord sequence for it. Gabriel said he spent "hours and hours" on an out-of-tune piano in the house of his wife Jill's parents in Kensington to develop the melody for the song.

The introduction reprises the album's opening song, "The Lamb Lies Down on Broadway". Banks remarked, "I don't know why, but I think the bit I'd written in the middle of the title track needed hearing again."

== Critical reception ==
The song has been described as "one of the all-time examples of progressive rock perfection" by PopMatters.

== Releases ==
"The Carpet Crawlers" reappears on the 1976 Genesis: In Concert film with Bill Bruford on drums, and on Seconds Out, Genesis' 1977 live album, with Chester Thompson on drums. It was also played on tours in 1980, 1981/82, 1983/84, 1998, 2007, 2021/22 and the Six of the Best reunion concert with Peter Gabriel in 1982. It was also performed once during the 1992 tour.

A re-recorded version, called "The Carpet Crawlers 1999", was released on the compilation album Turn It On Again: The Hits; this is the last recording to date by the 5-man line-up of Peter Gabriel, Steve Hackett, Tony Banks, Phil Collins and Mike Rutherford, and the last studio recording by any configuration of Genesis to date. Gabriel and Collins share the role of lead vocals, ultimately harmonizing toward the end of the song. Collins contributes percussion programming as well. The song's final verse was to be sung by Genesis' third singer Ray Wilson, but he left the band so the plan was dropped and the final verse was left out.

The B-sides of the 1999 single were "Turn It On Again" and "Follow You Follow Me". The song is also included as the final track of the 2007 live album Live Over Europe 2007 and on the live DVD When in Rome 2007.

== Performance variations ==
On the 1974 studio version, Peter Gabriel sang the introductory verse beginning with "There is lambs' wool under my naked feet...", while from 1976 onwards Phil Collins omitted the introduction, and started the song with "The crawlers cover the floor...". This later live version omitting the introductory verse is on Seconds Out. The song as sung by Collins was a fixture through 1980 to 1984 and was played as the final encore for each date of the 2007 Turn It On Again Tour (except the first show at the Hollywood Bowl because of rain) and the 2021/22 The Last Domino? Tour.

== Personnel ==
- Tony Banks – ARP Pro-Soloist & RMI Electra piano (1974); keyboards and additional programming (1999)
- Phil Collins – drums, percussion, backing vocals (1974); co-lead vocals and programmed drums (1999)
- Peter Gabriel – lead vocals and flute (1974); co-lead vocals and additional programming (1999)
- Steve Hackett – electric guitar
- Mike Rutherford – 12-string guitar, electric guitar, bass guitar, bass pedals

== Cover versions ==
- Under the title "Carpet Crawl", it was covered by the German band M. Walking on Water for their 1993 EP, Pictures of an Exhibitionist.
- As "The Carpet Crawler" it was covered by Human Drama on their 1993 Pin Ups release.
- A version was recorded by John Ford (ex-Strawbs) for the 1998 album The Fox Lies Down: A Tribute to Genesis (reissued in 2006 as Golden Sound: Tribute to Genesis).
- Another version was covered by the jazz band Fragile on their 2007 cover album smile.
- Nick D'Virgilio (who played drums on Genesis' 1997 album Calling All Stations) and Mark Hornsby covered the song as part of their Rewiring Genesis: A Tribute To The Lamb Lies Down On Broadway Project in 2008.
- A cover was arranged and recorded by the German symphonic rock/chant band Gregorian for their 2009 album Masters of Chant Chapter VII.
- The song was recorded for Steve Hackett's 2012 album Genesis Revisited II: Selection, with vocals by former Genesis singer Ray Wilson.
- It was covered by Mark Kozelek on his 2013 covers album Like Rats.
