= Stiltskin =

Scottish rock band

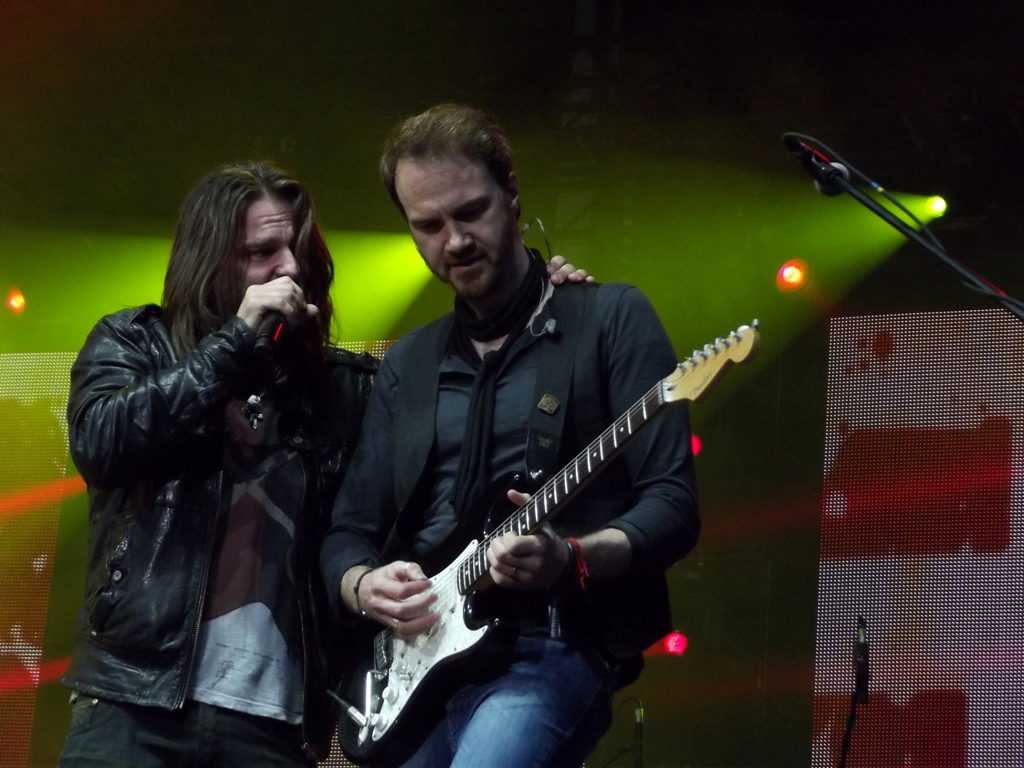
- Ray Wilson and Ali Ferguson performing in 2013

Background information
- Origin: Primrose Hill, London, England
- Genres: Post-grunge; alternative rock
- Years active: 1994–1996; 2005–present
- Labels: White Water; East West; Inside Out; Jaggy D
- Members: Ray Wilson; Ali Ferguson; Ashley MacMillan; Lawrie MacMillan; Filip Walcerz; Steve Wilson
- Past members: James Finnigan; Peter Lawlor; Ross McFarlane; Aubrey Nunn; Irvin Duguid; Uwe Metzler; Alvin Mills; Henrik Muller; Scott Spence; Nir Zidkyahu

Stiltskin are a Scottish rock band that first achieved widespread popularity in the mid-1990s. Stiltskin are led by frontman Ray Wilson, the only constant member throughout the band's history. They are best known for their 1994 UK chart-topper "Inside".

== Career ==
The band was put together in 1994 by multi-instrumentalist/songwriter Peter Lawlor to front the record he had made of the music he had written for the British Levi's television advertisement, "Creek". The resulting single, "Inside" topped the UK Singles Chart in 1994, but the band failed to produce further matching chart success with the follow-up single "Footsteps" reaching No. 34. The Ambrosian Singers performed Lawlor's choir-like intro vocals to "Inside". All instruments on the band's hit "Inside" were played by Peter Lawlor; this was also the case on the album track "An Illusion". The original line-up released only one album, The Mind's Eye, which achieved a silver record in the UK, and sold in decent quantities throughout Europe. The band made significant critical inroads in the US music scene, but little was to follow in the way of sales, though "Inside" reached No. 37 on the Billboard Mainstream Rock chart.

The original Stiltskin disbanded in 1996, during the recording of their uncompleted second album, for which James Finnigan had been replaced on bass by Aubrey Nunn, who later worked with Faithless.

Lawlor continued to run Water Music, writing and producing many high-profile themes: he wrote all of the music for the BBC One 'Rhythm & Movement' idents and also the theme for the 2000 Olympic Games coverage, and the theme for Premier League and FA Cup football matches shown on TV. Simultaneously, he worked as a city economist and academic economics lecturer, becoming Principal Economic Advisor at the German Stock Exchange Deutsche Börse.

McFarlane went on to work with The Proclaimers and achieved another number one in the UK Singles Chart. He went on to join the band Texas in 2009, leaving in early 2019.

Wilson joined Genesis and recorded Calling All Stations with the band (released in 1997) and toured Europe the following year. In 1999 he formed Cut_. In 2002, he launched a solo career.

In 2005, Wilson put a new band together under the name Stiltskin. Wilson himself and touring keyboardist Irvin Duguid (who later left the line-up) were the only members from the original line-up.

The new incarnation of Stiltskin released the album She in 2006. They toured Europe during 2006 and 2007, and a live album entitled Stiltskin Live, recorded on 25 October 2006, with material from this tour, was released in April 2007. In 2008, Stiltskin toured across Europe. A new Stiltskin album called Unfulfillment was released in 2011. In 2015, it was reported in the Edinburgh Evening News that drummer Ashley Macmillan had left Stiltskin to become a chef, citing the rigours of touring as the reason.

== Personnel ==
=== Members ===
Current members

- Ray Wilson – lead vocals (1994–1996, 2005–present), guitar (2005–present)
- Ali Ferguson – guitar, backing vocals (2006–present)
- Lawrie MacMillan – bass, backing vocals (2006–present)
- Filip Walcerz – keyboards (2010–present)
- Steve Wilson – guitar, backing vocals (2010–present)

Former members

- James Finnigan – bass, keyboards (1994–1995)
- Peter Lawlor – guitar, bass, keyboards, drums, backing vocals (1994–1996)
- Ross McFarlane – drums, percussion (1994–1996)
- Aubrey Nunn – bass (1995–1996)
- Irvin Duguid – keyboards (2005–2006; touring musician 1994–1995)
- Uwe Metzler – guitar (2005–2011)
- Alvin Mills – bass (2005–2006)
- Henrik Muller – drums, percussion (2005–2006)
- Scott Spence – guitar (2005–2006)
- Nir Zidkyahu – drums, percussion (2005–2006)
- Ashley MacMillan – drums, percussion (2006–2015)

=== Lineups ===
1994–1995	1995–1996	1996–2005	2005–2006
James Finnigan – bass, keyboards; Peter Lawlor – guitar, bass, keyboards, drums, backing vocals; Ross McFarlane – drums, percussion; Ray Wilson – lead vocals; Touring musician: Irvin Duguid – keyboards (1994–1995)	Peter Lawlor – guitar, bass, keyboards, drums, backing vocals; Ross McFarlane – drums, percussion; Ray Wilson – lead vocals; Aubrey Nunn – bass	Disbanded	Ray Wilson – lead vocals, guitar; Irvin Duguid – keyboards; Uwe Metzler – guitar; Alvin Mills – bass; Henrik Muller – drums, percussion; Scott Spence – guitar; Nir Zidkyahu – drums, percussion
2006–2010	2010–2011	2011–2015	2015–present
Ray Wilson – lead vocals, guitar; Uwe Metzler – guitar; Ali Ferguson – guitar, backing vocals; Ashley MacMillan – drums, percussion; Lawrie MacMillan – bass, backing vocals	Ray Wilson – lead vocals, guitar; Uwe Metzler – guitar; Ali Ferguson – guitar, backing vocals; Ashley MacMillan – drums, percussion; Lawrie MacMillan – bass, backing vocals; Filip Walcerz – keyboards; Steve Wilson – guitar, backing vocals	Ray Wilson – lead vocals, guitar; Ali Ferguson – guitar, backing vocals; Ashley MacMillan – drums, percussion; Lawrie MacMillan – bass, backing vocals; Filip Walcerz – keyboards; Steve Wilson – guitar, backing vocals	Ray Wilson – lead vocals, guitar; Ali Ferguson – guitar, backing vocals; Lawrie MacMillan – bass, backing vocals; Filip Walcerz – keyboards; Steve Wilson – guitar, backing vocals

== Discography ==
=== Studio albums ===
List of studio albums, with selected details and chart positions
Title	Details	Peak chart positions							
Title	Details	AUS	AUT	GER	NLD	NZL	SWE	SWI	UK
The Mind's Eye	Released: 17 October 1994; Label: White Water (UK) East West (US); Formats: CD, cassette, LP	100	10	11	76	36	13	13	17
She	Released: 2006; Label: Inside Out Music; Formats: CD, digital download	—	—	—	—	—	—	—	—
Unfulfillment	Released: 9 September 2011; Label: Jaggy D; Formats: CD, digital download	—	—	—	—	—	—	—	—

=== Live albums ===
List of live albums, with selected details
Title	Album details
Ray Wilson and Stiltskin Live	Released: 2007; Label: Inside Out Music; Format: CD

=== Singles ===
List of singles, with selected chart positions
Title	Year	Peak chart positions										Album
Title	Year	AUS	AUT	BEL	FRA	GER	NLD	NOR	SWE	SWI	UK	Album
"Inside"	1994	40	2	23	9	5	7	5	4	5	1	The Mind's Eye
"Footsteps"	1994	—	—	26	—	—	—	—	—	34	34	The Mind's Eye
"Rest in Peace"	1995	—	—	—	—	—	—	—	—	—	92	The Mind's Eye
"She"	2006	—	—	—	—	—	—	—	—	—	—	She
"Lemon Yellow Sun"	2006	—	—	—	—	—	—	—	—	—	—	She
