= Not About Us =

Single by Genesis

from the album Calling All Stations
- Released: 23 February 1998
- Recorded: 1997
- Studio: The Farm (Chiddingfold, Surrey)
- Genre: Alternative rock
- Length: 4:38 (album version); 4:04 (radio edit)
- Label: Virgin
- Songwriters: Tony Banks; Mike Rutherford; Ray Wilson
- Producers: Nick Davis; Tony Banks; Mike Rutherford

Genesis singles chronology
"Shipwrecked" (1997)	"Not About Us" (1998)	"The Carpet Crawlers 1999" (1999)

"Not About Us" is the third and final single from Genesis' 15th album Calling All Stations. It reached No. 66 in UK and No. 81 in Germany. It was the last single to feature vocalist Ray Wilson.

== Music video ==
A music video for the single was made.

== Track listing ==
- Not About Us CD1
1. "Not About Us" (radio edit) – 4:04
2. "Anything Now" (non-album track) – 6:58
3. "Sign Your Life Away" (non-album track) – 4:44
4. "Run Out of Time" (non-album track) – 6:07
- Total length: 21:53
- Not About Us CD2
1. "Not About Us" – 4:38
2. "Dancing with the Moonlit Knight" (acoustic)
3. "Follow You Follow Me" (acoustic)
4. "Not About Us" (acoustic)

== Personnel ==
- Tony Banks: keyboards, guitar (acoustic tracks on CD2)
- Mike Rutherford: guitar, bass
- Ray Wilson: vocals

Additional personnel:

- Nir Z: drums
- Nick D'Virgilio: drums on "Sign Your Life Away"
- Anthony Drennan: guitar (acoustic tracks on CD2)
