= Ray Wilson (musician) =

Scottish musician (born 1968)

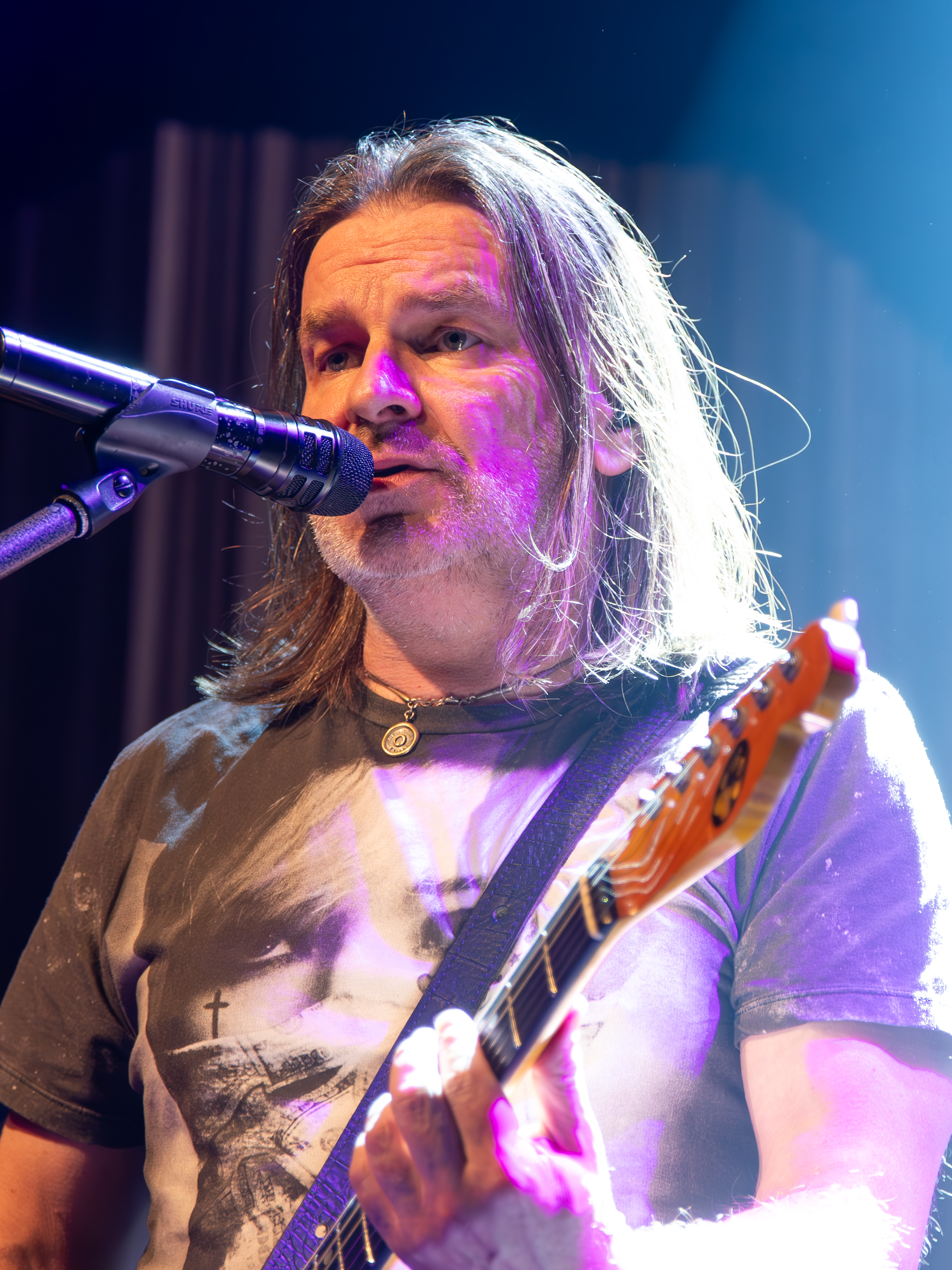
- Wilson performing in 2024

Background information
- Born: 8 September 1968 (age 57); Dumfries, Scotland
- Genres: Rock; pop; post-grunge
- Occupations: Singer; guitarist
- Instruments: Vocals; guitar; bass; harmonica
- Years active: 1983–present
- Labels: Inside Out; Virgin
- Member of: Stiltskin
- Formerly of: Genesis

Ray Wilson (musician) A concert in the city of Tychy. Author: Maxim Stoyalov

Raymond Wilson (born 8 September 1968) is a Scottish singer and guitarist, vocalist in the post-grunge band Stiltskin and in Genesis from 1996 to approximately 1999.

== Early career and Guaranteed Pure ==
Before starting a band called Guaranteed Pure in the 1990s, which featured himself along with Paul Holmes (keyboards), Steve Wilson (guitars), John Haimes (bass) and Chris Cavanagh (drums)., he joined Edinburgh Band Strategy in 1987 recording and independently releasing a demo titled Second Move. Guaranteed Pure released an album called Swing Your Bag, the title track of which was included on a compilation album on the label of Fish entitled The Funny Farm Project : Outpatients '93.

== Stiltskin ==
Wilson’s breakthrough came in 1994 when he became lead vocalist for the post‑grunge band Stiltskin. Their debut single "Inside" topped charts across Europe, including Germany, driven by its use in a Levi’s commercial.

In the UK and Germany, "Inside" was a defining hit where rock radio and MTV propelled Stiltskin into the spotlight almost overnight.

The album The Mind's Eye received critical acclaim as a brilliant and highly underrated record with Wilson's vocals being described as "terrific" and "flawless".

== Genesis ==
Wilson joined Genesis as the band's lead singer after Phil Collins officially announced his departure in March 1996. Genesis founder members Tony Banks and Mike Rutherford were handed a CD of the Stiltskin album The Mind's Eye from Virgin Records executives. They were impressed with Wilson's vocal abilities and had their manager, Tony Smith, contact him for an audition.

Other singers who auditioned included Nick Van Eede (Cutting Crew), Francis Dunnery (It Bites), Kevin Gilbert (Toy Matinee, Sheryl Crow), and David Longdon (subsequently of Big Big Train)

After extensive sessions in late 1996, Wilson was announced as the new lead singer of Genesis in June 1997.

Their only album with Wilson, ...Calling All Stations..., was released that September and became a top 10 worldwide hit. The album was re-issued in 2007.

Wilson's vocals brought a darker, smoother, and more atmospheric style than the Collins-era.

In May 2001, during an interview with Dave Negrin for website WorldofGenesis.com, Wilson said:

They basically phoned me up and said, "Ray, we're not continuing." I've never really felt that I was out of the band as such; it's just that the band doesn't exist any more (laughs). When I heard that, it was just after the Cut tour, about a year and a half ago. I've read some articles saying that I was fired and stuff, but to be fair to them, they didn't phone me up and say, "Ray, you're fired. We're going to carry on and we're going to get somebody else to sing." Or, "We're going to carry on and get Phil back." There was never any of that. They just said, "We've decided not to continue because the market doesn't want us." I think they didn't want to completely close the door to ever doing anything again.

In a 2007 interview with Anil Prasad for Innerviews, Mike Rutherford said:

"I think had we done three albums with Ray, the first one would have been viewed as a start, but not a great one.

Ray did a fantastic job and he often doesn’t get enough credit. He was great live and it was a very hard gig.

However, I just didn’t want to have to keep making albums and touring solidly for the next three or four years."

== Solo career ==
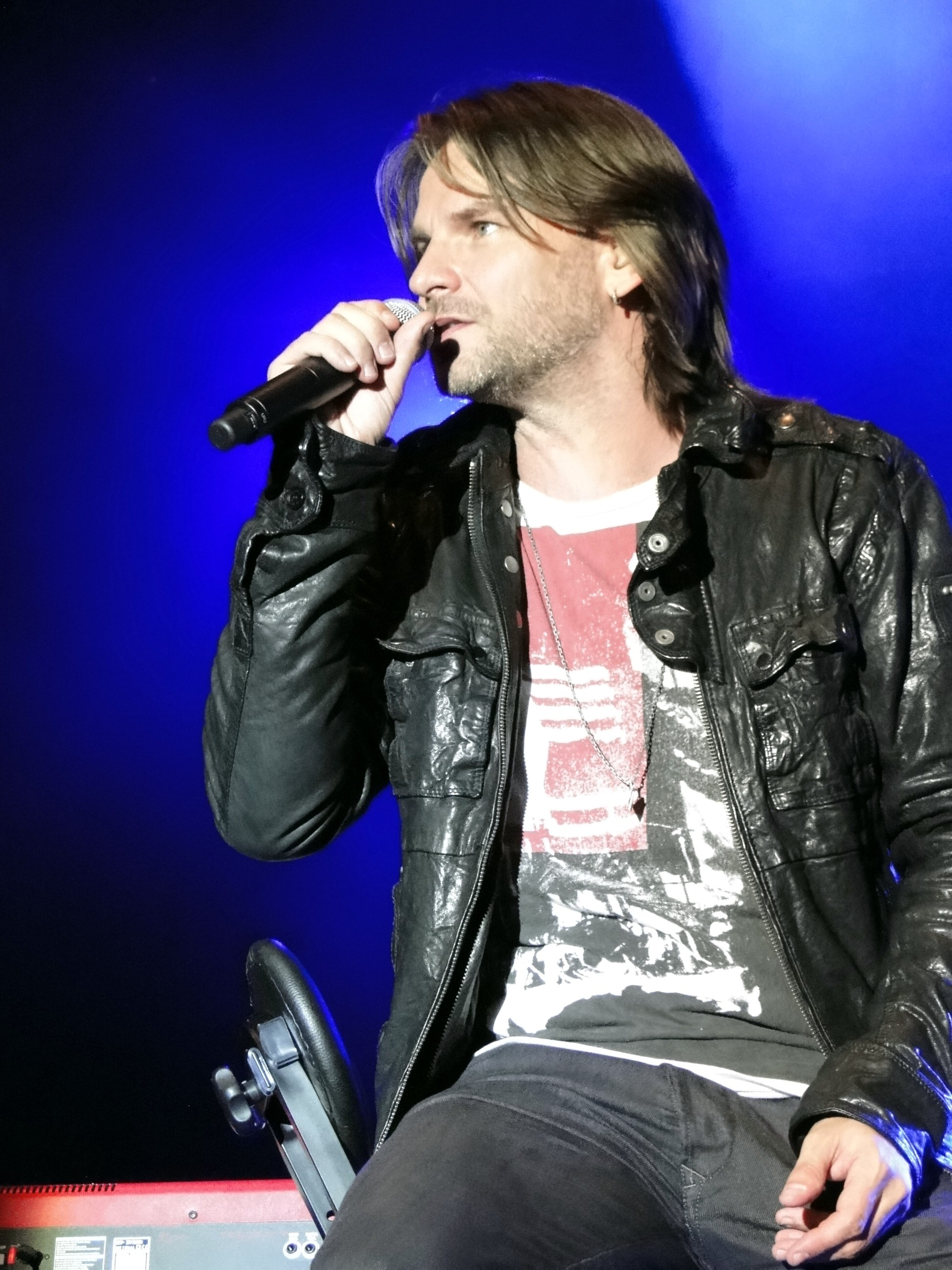
Wilson performing in 2010

In 1999, Wilson released the album Millionairhead with a solo project called Cut_. It was remastered in 2007 with three additional songs added.

Wilson began what has become a very successful solo career in 2003, when he released his first solo album Change.

In 2004, he released another studio album entitled The Next Best Thing, which included a new version of the Stiltskin hit "Inside".

In 2006, he revived Stiltskin releasing the album She, followed in 2007 by a Stiltskin live CD recorded 25 October 2006, at Harmonie, Bonn, Germany.

DJ and trance producer Armin van Buuren has produced remixes of the songs "Another Day" (retitled "Yet Another Day") and "Gypsy" from Millionairhead. Both remixes have been respectively released on van Buuren's own albums 76 and Shivers, and "Yet Another Day" was also released as a single.

In 2014, the first Ray Wilson biography, Gypsy, by journalist Mario Giammetti, was published in Italy (Edizioni Segno).

In June 2016, his new solo album Song for a Friend was released, which included ten unreleased acoustic tracks with a cover of Pink Floyd's "High Hopes." The original idea for the album title was Backseat Drivers. It was to be a double album. Wilson wanted to have one CD with acoustic music and a second CD with electric music. He then decided to split the two. In an interview he explained the decision was taken because the acoustic version of Song for a Friend would not have got the attention it deserves. The second disc (the electric and rockier collection of new songs) was later released in September of the same year as a stand-alone new album called Makes Me Think of Home.

On 7 and 8 September 2018, Wilson gave two exclusive concerts in Poznań at Zamek Culture Centre to celebrate his 50th birthday. Those two special nights titled "50th Celebration Birthday Concerts" saw Wilson performing only Genesis (and band members) material during the first night, while his solo material from his various projects (solo, Stiltskin and Cut_) on the second date. This was the first time he played a full concert without any Genesis songs since his tenure with the band.

== Concerts with Steve Hackett ==
In 2013, Wilson joined Steve Hackett for the latter's Genesis Revisited II Tour as a guest singer at three shows of the tour. He was featured in a special edition of the Genesis Revisited II album on the track "Carpet Crawlers". It was the first time since 1998 that Wilson had worked with a fellow Genesis member, albeit one he had not performed with as a member of the band. In October 2024, Wilson performed "Carpet Crawlers" live with Steve Hackett at the Royal Albert Hall in London at Steve Hackett's final show of the UK leg of his world tour.

== Discography ==
=== Solo releases ===
Studio albums

- Change (2003) – No. 88 Germany
- The Next Best Thing (2004)
- Propaganda Man (2008)
- Chasing Rainbows (2013) – No. 57 Germany
- Song for a Friend (2016)
- Makes Me Think of Home (2016) – No. 88 Germany
- The Weight of Man (2021)

Live albums

- Live and Acoustic (2001) (originally titled Unplugged)
- Ray Wilson Live (2005)
- An Audience and Ray Wilson (2006) (limited edition CD and download)
- Ray Wilson and the Berlin Symphony Ensemble, Genesis Klassik Live in Berlin (2009)
- Ray Wilson and the Berlin Symphony Ensemble, Genesis Classic Live in Poznan (2011)
- Genesis VS Stiltskin - 20 Years and More (2014) – No. 21 Germany
- Up Close and Personal - Live at SWR1 (2014)
- Time and Distance (2017)
- ZDF@BAUHAUS May 20, 2018 (2018)

Greatest Hits

- Upon My Life (2019)

Singles

- "Yet Another Day" (with Armin van Buuren) (October 2002) – No. 70 United Kingdom
- "Change" (March 2003)
- "Goodbye Baby Blue" (September 2003)
- "These Are the Changes" (June 2004)

=== Guaranteed Pure ===
- Swing Your Bag (1993)

=== Stiltskin ===
Studio albums

- The Mind's Eye (1994) – No. 12 UK, No. 11 Germany, No. 10 Austria, No. 76 Netherlands, No. 13 Sweden, No. 13 Switzerland,
- She (2006)
- Unfulfillment (2011)

Live albums

- Stiltskin Live (2007)

Singles

- "Inside" (1994) – No. 1 UK, No. 5 Germany, No. 2 Austria, No. 9 France, No. 7 Netherlands, No. 5 Norway, No. 4 Sweden, No. 5 Switzerland, No. 40 Australia, No. 20 New Zealand
- "Footsteps" (1994) – No. 34 UK, No. 34 Switzerland, No. 36 New Zealand
- "Rest in Peace" (1995) – No. 47 UK
- "She" (2006)
- "Lemon Yellow Sun" (2006)
- "First Day Of Change" (2011, Promo)

=== Genesis ===
Studio albums

- Calling All Stations (1997) – No. 2 UK, No. 54 US

Singles

- "Congo" (September 1997) – No. 29 UK, No. 35 Austria, No. 31 Germany, No. 32 Switzerland, No. 25 US Billboard Mainstream Rock Tracks
- "Shipwrecked" (December 1997) – No. 54 UK, No. 82 Germany
- "Not About Us" (March 1998) – No. 66 UK, No. 81 Germany

=== Cut_ ===
Studio albums

- Millionairhead (1999)

Singles

- "Another Day" (1999; Germany-only single)
- "Sarah" (1999)
- "Millionairhead" / "Sarah" (1999; radio promo)

=== Collaborations ===
- 2000 "Big City Nights" (with Scorpions) (Moment of Glory)
- 2002 "Love Supreme" Turntablerocker (Smile)
- 2003 "Good Time Love" (with Amanda Lyon) (A tribute to Frank Miller: various artists album)
- 2003 "Yet Another Day" (with Armin Van Buuren) (76) – No. 70 UK, No. 34 Netherlands
- 2005 "Gypsy" (with Armin Van Buuren) (Shivers)
- 2005 "Roses" (with RPWL) (World Through My Eyes)
- 2005 "Roses (live)" & "Not about us (live)"(with RPWL) (Start the Fire: RPWL Live)
- 2009 "Show Me The Way" (with DJ Cosmo)
- 2010 "Should I Wait" (with Twentyeight) (In the Beginning)
- 2013 "Carpet Crawlers" (with Steve Hackett) (Genesis Revisited II: Selection)
- 2015 "Walking in Memphis" (with Tune Brothers)
- 2015 "Here Comes the Rain Again" (with Tune Brothers)
- 2015 "Easy Way Out" (with The Veterans)
- 2015 "Taking the Easy Way Out" (with The Veterans) (HOUSESESSION IBIZA IMS 2015 SAMPLER)
- 2017 "Bezustannie" (with Patrycja Markowska) (Krótka Płyta O Miłości)

== Personal life ==
Wilson is the cousin of Ian Wilson, better known as Ian Catskilkin, of the UK indie band, Art Brut.

Ray met his future wife Tyla Holmes in 2000. Holmes is the sister of Paul Holmes, the keyboard player in Wilson's then-band Guaranteed Pure. They started dating, and married in 2002. She began working as his assistant, and then tour manager. They separated at the end of 2006 but remained good friends, with Holmes keeping her managerial role even after the ending of their relationship. She later left the music industry and concentrated on a career as a personal trainer in Australia.

In 2007, after a concert in Poland, Wilson met the dancer Małgorzata Mielech, also known as Gosia. After a few months of dating, he left Edinburgh and moved to Poznań in September 2008. To celebrate their lasting love, in 2016 Ray wrote a song for Gosia entitled "Not Long 'Til Springtime": she appeared as main actor in the official video of the song. As of 2018, the couple were engaged. Despite Wilson being reluctant to show and talk about his personal life, he and Gosia gave a major interview with an exclusive photoshoot showing the duo together for the famous Polish magazine "Pani" in August 2018. He married singer and songwriter Marika Jasek in October 2024 during a private ceremony.
