= Nir Z =

Israeli musical artist

Nir Zidkyahu ניר צדקיהו
- Born: November 1967 (age 58); Rishon LeZion, Israel
- Genres: Rock
- Occupation: Drummer
- Instrument: Drums
- Years active: 1980s–present

Nir Zidkyahu (Hebrew: ניר צדקיהו, [ˈniʁ t͡sidˈkija(h)u], born November 1967), also known as Nir Z, is an Israeli studio-session drummer, and the brother of Blackfield's drummer Tomer Z.

In spring 1997 he joined Genesis, playing on eight tracks for their last album, Calling All Stations, and then became available for their 1997-1998 tour. In 2000, Zidkyahu drummed on John Mayer's breakthrough album, Room for Squares. Since then, he has played drums and percussion for various artists including Jason Mraz, Joss Stone, Caroline Jones, Ray Wilson and Alana Davis. In 2003, he recorded with Flaw on their Endangered Species record and, in 2007, with Chris Cornell on his second solo album, Carry On. Zidkyahu played on several songs of the comeback album, Skyscraper, for former Journey singer Steve Augeri's original band Tall Stories, in 2009. Also that year, Zidkyahu went on tour drumming for Billy Squier.

Zidkyahu was hired by Toontrack to record the drum samples for their virtual drum software Superior Drummer 2.0, and New York Studios Vol. 2 and Vol. 3 SDX expansions.
