= The Same Moon =

Single by Phil Collins

from the album Dance into the Light
- B-side: "I Don't Want to Go"; "Always" (Live)
- Released: 20 October 1997
- Genre: Pop rock
- Label: Atlantic; Virgin; WEA
- Songwriter: Phil Collins
- Producers: Phil Collins; Hugh Padgham

Phil Collins singles chronology
"Wear My Hat" (1997)	"The Same Moon" (1997)	"True Colors" (1998)

Audio
- "Phil Collins - The Same Moon (2016 Remaster Official Audio)" on YouTube

"The Same Moon" is a song by Phil Collins from his sixth solo studio album Dance into the Light (1996). Written by Collins, and produced by him and Hugh Padgham, the song was released in October 1997, as the fifth and final single from the album. Like his previous single, "No Matter Who", it received only a limited release. The song was only released in Germany, where it reached number 87. The song managed to reach the top ten in Poland, peaking at number six. No music video was made for the song. The single contains B-sides that were available on previous singles from the album.

The B-sides were a live version of the song "Always" from the Montreux Jazz Festival and the unreleased track "I Don't Want to Go." The latter one however was also released as the B-side of "It's in Your Eyes" single.

== Personnel ==
- Phil Collins – drums, vocals, keyboards, lead guitar
- Brad Cole – organ
- Daryl Stuermer – rhythm guitar
- Ronnie Caryl – rhythm guitar
- Nathan East – bass
- Amy Keys – backing vocals
- Arnold McCuller – backing vocals

== Charts ==
Chart (1997)	Peak position
Estonia (Eesti Top 20)	15
Germany (Official German Charts)	87
Poland Airplay (Music & Media)	6
