= Wear My Hat =

Single by Phil Collins

from the album Dance into the Light
- Released: 27 May 1997
- Recorded: 1995
- Genre: Pop; worldbeat
- Length: 4:44
- Label: Atlantic; Virgin; WEA
- Songwriter: Phil Collins
- Producers: Phil Collins; Hugh Padgham

Phil Collins singles chronology
"No Matter Who" (1997)	"Wear My Hat" (1997)	"The Same Moon" (1997)

Music video
- "Phil Collins - Wear My Hat (Official Music Video)" on YouTube

"Wear My Hat" is a song by English drummer Phil Collins released as the fourth single from his album Dance into the Light. It was only released in the United Kingdom and peaked at #43 on the UK Singles Chart. Collins said in an interview that the song and its music video is about the pressures of fame and how some fans grow an attachment to their favourite stars. The video for the song featured actor Danny DeVito.

The song was played throughout the Trip into the Light World Tour and on the First Final Farewell Tour. A live performance of the song was also recorded for Top of the Pops. However, it was not aired (at the time) most likely due to its very low charting position, but it was then shown in full on an episode of Top of the Pops 2 several years later.

== Track listing ==
1. "Wear My Hat" – 4:44
2. "Wear My Hat" (Edited Hat Dance Mix) – 4:57
3. "Wear My Hat" (Hat Dance Mix) – 9:09
4. "Wear My Hat" (Wear My Dub) – 6:40

== Charts ==
Chart (1997)	Peak position
Dutch Singles Chart	90
Estonia (Eesti Top 20)	7
German Singles Chart	81
UK Singles (OCC)	43

== Credits ==
- Phil Collins – drums, vocals
- Brad Cole – keyboards
- Daryl Stuermer – lead guitar
- Ronnie Caryl – rhythm guitar
- Nathan East – bass
- Amy Keys – backing vocals
- Arnold McCuller – backing vocals
- Vine Street Horns
  - Andrew Woolfolk – saxophone
  - Arturo Velasco – trombone
  - Harry Kim – trumpet
  - Daniel Fornero – trumpet

== Notes ==
- Wear My Hat at Discogs
