= Dance into the Light (song) =

Single by Phil Collins

from the album Dance into the Light
- B-side: "Take Me Down"; "It's Over"
- Released: 17 September 1996
- Genre: Pop rock; worldbeat; pop
- Length: 4:23
- Label: Atlantic; Virgin; WEA
- Songwriter: Phil Collins
- Producers: Phil Collins; Hugh Padgham

Phil Collins singles chronology
"Somewhere" (1996)	"Dance into the Light" (1996)	"It's in Your Eyes" (1996)

Music video
- "Dance into the Light" on YouTube

"Dance into the Light" is a song performed by English drummer, singer-songwriter, record producer, and actor Phil Collins, released on 17 September 1996, by Atlantic, Virgin and WEA, as the first single from his sixth studio album, Dance into the Light (1996). The song was written by Collins, who also co-produced it with Hugh Padgham. It peaked at number nine on the UK Singles Chart, but was a disappointment on the US Billboard Hot 100 and Cash Box Top 100, reaching number 45 on both charts. The song also peaked within the top 10 in the Czech Republic, Estonia, Hungary and Scotland, while reaching number 29 on the Eurochart Hot 100 in October 1996. The accompanying music video was directed by English musician and music video director Kevin Godley. The track was the only song from Dance into the Light to be featured on his compilation album ...Hits in 1998. B-sides were songs "Take Me Down" and "It's Over".

== Critical reception ==
Swedish Aftonbladet described the song as a "bombastic light-reggae swing" and named it an "absolute hit". AllMusic editor Stephen Thomas Erlewine said in his review of the Dance into the Light album, that the song "recalls the snappy punch" of Collins' 1985 song "Sussudio". Larry Flick from Billboard magazine called it a "sunny and uptempo ditty that is awash in Caribbean-style horns and Stax-like pop beats." He felt that Collins "sounds like he is having an absolute blast here. In fact, you can almost hear the grin he must have been wearing in the recording studio shining through the music." Another Billboard editor, Paul Verna, declared it as "peppy".

The Daily Vault's Christopher Thelen wrote that "Dance into the Light" "with its different rhythm pattern, instantly engages the listener, and is one of the best singles Collins has written in a long time." David Browne from Entertainment Weekly stated that the singer "tries to broaden his palette", and added that "Afro-beat rhythms propel" the song, "which also tosses in politically correct references to South Africa." A reviewer from Music Week gave it a score of four out of five, noting that Collins "returns with an uptempo ballad that bears his unmistakable mark."

== Track listing ==
1. "Dance into the Light" – 4:23
2. "Take Me Down" – 3:27
3. "It's Over" (Home Demo) – 4:22

== Credits ==
- Phil Collins – drums, percussion, vocals, kalimba
- Brad Cole – keyboards
- Daryl Stuermer – lead guitar
- Ronnie Caryl – rhythm guitar
- Nathan East – bass
- Amy Keys – backing vocals
- Arnold McCuller – backing vocals
- Vine Street Horns
  - Andrew Woolfolk – saxophones
  - Arturo Velasco – trombone
  - Harry Kim – trumpet
  - Daniel Fornero – trumpet
- Horns arranged by Harry Kim and Phil Collins

== Charts ==
Chart (1996–97)	Peak position
Australia (ARIA)	36
Austria (Ö3 Austria Top 40)	31
Belgium (Ultratop 50 Flanders)	50
Canada Top Singles (RPM)	7
Canada Adult Contemporary (RPM)	3
Czech Republic (IFPI CR)	3
Estonia (Eesti Top 20)	4
Europe (Eurochart Hot 100)	29
France (SNEP)	48
Germany (GfK)	42
Hungary (Mahasz)	4
Iceland (Íslenski Listinn Topp 40)	34
Israel (Israeli Singles Chart)	20
Italy (Musica e dischi)	22
Italy Airplay (Music & Media)	1
Netherlands (Dutch Top 40)	23
Netherlands (Single Top 100)	14
Poland Airplay (Music & Media)	2
Scotland (Official Charts)	9
Switzerland (Schweizer Hitparade)	26
UK Singles (Official Charts)	9
UK Airplay (Music Week)	8
US Billboard Hot 100	45
US Adult Contemporary (Billboard)	6
US Mainstream Top 40 (Billboard)	35
US Cash Box Top 100	45

== Release history ==
Release dates and formats for "Dance into the Light"
Region	Date	Format(s)	Label(s)	Ref.
United States	17 September 1996	Contemporary hit radio	Atlantic	
Europe	20 September 1996	CD	Atlantic	
United Kingdom	23 September 1996	CD; Cassette	East West; Face Value	

== Notes ==
- Dance into the Light at Discogs
