= Illegal Alien (song) =

Single by Genesis

from the album Genesis
- B-side: "Turn It On Again" (Live)
- Released: 23 January 1984
- Studio: The Farm (Chiddingfold, Surrey)
- Length: 4:33 (single version); 5:14 (album version)
- Label: Atlantic; Virgin; Vertigo
- Songwriters: Tony Banks; Phil Collins; Mike Rutherford
- Producers: Banks; Collins; Rutherford; Hugh Padgham

Genesis singles chronology
| "Home by the Sea" (1983) | "Illegal Alien" (1984) | "Taking It All Too Hard" (1984) |

Music video
- "Illegal Alien" on YouTube

"Illegal Alien" is a song by the English rock band Genesis. It was written by members Tony Banks, Phil Collins, and Mike Rutherford, produced by all three alongside Hugh Padgham, and released as the third single from their eponymous 1983 studio album in January 1984. The song's lyrics, inspired by the band's troubles with getting visas to reenter the United States while on tour, tell the satirical story of an illegal immigrant facing obstacles in the process of trying to move to the United States. Its accompanying music video depicts the members of Genesis as a group of Mexican men unsuccessfully attempting to get their passports approved, and shows them in ponchos and sombreros.

"Illegal Alien" reached number 46 on the UK singles chart, and number 44 on the Billboard Hot 100. In retrospective reviews, "Illegal Alien" and its music video received largely negative reception, with critics describing both as racist and stereotypical. Genesis performed the song live throughout their Mama Tour from 1983 to 1984.

== Composition and release ==
"Illegal Alien" was written by Phil Collins, Tony Banks, and Mike Rutherford, and produced by all three with Hugh Padgham. It appeared on Genesis's 1983 eponymous studio album, and was released as a single in 1984 with an edited live version of "Turn It On Again" as its B-side. It was also released as a B-side on the Australasia 12" single release of "Home by the Sea". The song's lyrics, written by Rutherford, were inspired by the band's difficulties with trying to get visas to enter the US while on tour, and was meant to be sympathetic towards the plight of immigrants. They are a satirical depiction of the frustrations an illegal immigrant faces in coming to the United States, with Collins affecting a stereotypical Mexican accent.

The song begins with its narrator waking up from a hangover before going to the bar carrying a bottle of tequila, leading up to the chorus: "It's no fun being an illegal alien." The midsection features piano and a trumpet played by Collins, as well as sound effects, such as traffic noises and a telephone ringing, recorded by Banks's E-mu Emulator sampler. The bridge is inspired by mariachi music, and the second stanza of the bridge—in which the protagonist offers sexual favors from his sister in exchange for admittance across the border—was edited out of radio versions of the song, as well as from the music video version, with listeners considering it offensive.

== Critical reception and commercial performance ==
Blender listed "Illegal Alien" as the 13th worst song of all time in 2006. Wired's Scott Thill described the lyrics as "misguided" and the song itself as "confusing (and confused)". Steve Spears of the Tampa Bay Times called the lyrics "ridiculous" and asked if it was "one of the most racist songs of the '80s". For Reader's Digest, Jeremy Helligar included "Illegal Alien" on a list of racist songs and wrote that "the fact that it exists at all proves that undervaluing Mexicans has been an American theme for decades". Shannon Sweet of the San Antonio Current wrote that it "goes full-on racist" and "tackles every Hispanic stereotype that exists", while Ryan Reed of Stereogum called it "face-palm filler" and a "borderline-racist border-crossing sing-along". Cashbox said that the song illustrates "Genesis' ability to be versatile and commercially successful at the same time."

The New Republic's Kathleen Massara offered "Illegal Alien" as an example of how Genesis were "not known for tactfulness toward minorities". The Ringer's Steven Hyden called it the most infamous song from Genesis, and described Collins's vocals as "a grotesque Speedy Gonzales–level caricature of a tequila-swilling Mexican immigrant". An op-ed for the Arkansas Democrat-Gazette called the song "really awful". In his book The Songs of Genesis: A Complete Guide to the Studio Recordings, Steve Aldous wrote that, despite the song's sympathetic approach, it "can be considered a misjudgment" and had "questionable lyrics", but had a "memorable" hook. The A.V. Club's Steven Hyden wrote in 2008 that he "really loved" "Illegal Alien" in spite of it being "really offensive", "racist", and "tough not to cringe" at, due to its "irresistible" melody and its lyrics "set[ting] the scene pretty vividly". AllMusic's François Couture stated that the song "should be seen as harmless fun" and that "what made the song work" was it being "as subtle as a Cheech and Chong movie".

"Illegal Alien" peaked at number 46 on the UK Singles Chart and stayed on the chart for five weeks. It also appeared at number 44 on the Billboard Hot 100.

== Music video ==
The promotional music video for "Illegal Alien" was released after the music video for "That's All", and Collins considered it the best music video from their eponymous studio album. It shows the members of Genesis as a group of Mexican men trying to get their passports approved. It features them wearing sombreros and ponchos, with Collins sporting a bushy fake mustache, a toupee, and a five o'clock shadow.

On his 2018 list of politically incorrect songs, USA Today's Patrick Ryan wrote that, while the message of "Illegal Alien" was "seemingly well-intentioned", the stereotypes depicted in its music video painted it in a racist light. Nick DeRiso of Ultimate Classic Rock called the video "blatantly racist", while Scott Thill of Wired called it "very wrong" and "a train wreck" and Steve Spears of the Tampa Bay Times described it as "oddly insulting". Steven Hyden of The A.V. Club wrote that, while the video for "Illegal Alien" "touch[ed] on pretty much every Mexican stereotype, like a check list", it was "too self-consciously silly and plain old fun to be truly offensive".

== Live performances ==
"Illegal Alien" was only played live in its entirety during the Mama Tour. The concert film The Mama Tour features a live version of the song performed at the National Exhibition Centre in Birmingham, England, in 1984. An excerpt from the song was included as part of the "Old Medley" featured on The Way We Walk, Volume Two: The Longs (1993) and The Way We Walk – Live in Concert (1992). Colin McGuire of PopMatters called "Illegal Alien" being placed next to "The Lamb Lies Down on Broadway" in the "Old Medley" "disrespectful to the latter's epic incarnation". A live version is featured on disc two of Genesis Archive 2: 1976–1992 (2000), which was recorded live at the Forum in Los Angeles, California in January 1984.

On an episode of Late Night with Jimmy Fallon, the American hip hop band the Roots played "Illegal Alien" as American conservative political commentator Lou Dobbs walked out on stage, as a reference to his comments on immigration.

== Track listings ==
7" single

1. "Illegal Alien" – 4:33
2. "Turn It On Again" (Live) – 5:24

12" maxi

1. "Illegal Alien" – 5:14
2. "Turn It On again" (Live extended version) – 9:26

== Personnel ==
Credits adapted from Tidal.

Genesis

- Phil Collins – lead vocals, drums, percussion, trumpet
- Tony Banks – keyboards, backing vocals
- Mike Rutherford – acoustic guitar, bass guitar, backing vocals

Production

- Hugh Padgham – production, engineering
- Phil Collins – production
- Tony Banks – production
- Mike Rutherford – production
- Tony Cousins – engineering, remastering
- Nick Davis – mixing
- Tom Mitchell – assistant mixing

== Charts ==
| Chart (1984) | Peak position |
|---|---|
| Canada Top Singles (RPM) | 41 |
| Ireland (IRMA) | 21 |
| UK Singles (Official Charts) | 46 |
| US Billboard Hot 100 | 44 |
