= You Ought to Know =

You Ought to Know may refer to:

- You Ought to Know... Phil Collins EP
- You Oughta Know, song by Alanis Morissette
