= Genesis (Genesis album) =

Studio album by Genesis
- Released: 3 October 1983
- Recorded: Spring 1983
- Studios: The Farm (Chiddingfold, Surrey)
- Genre: Pop rock
- Length: 46:18
- Labels: Charisma; Virgin
- Producers: Genesis; Hugh Padgham

Genesis chronology
Three Sides Live (1982)	Genesis (1983)	Invisible Touch (1986)

Singles from Genesis
- 1. "Mama" Released: 22 August 1983; 2. "That's All" Released: 31 October 1983; 3. "Home by the Sea" Released: 1983 (AUS); 4. "Illegal Alien" Released: 23 January 1984; 5. "Taking It All Too Hard" Released: June 1984 (US)

Genesis is the twelfth studio album by the English rock band Genesis, released on 3 October 1983 by Charisma and Virgin Records in the UK and by Atlantic Records in the US and Canada. Following the band's tour in support of their 1982 live album Three Sides Live, Genesis took an eight-month break before they regrouped in the spring of 1983 to record a new album. It is their first written and recorded in its entirety at their studio named The Farm in Chiddingfold, Surrey, and the songs were developed through jam sessions in the studio with nothing written beforehand. Hugh Padgham returned as their engineer.

Genesis was the group's greatest commercial success at the time of release, becoming the band's third straight album to reach No. 1 on the UK Albums Chart. It also reached No. 9 on the US Billboard 200, where it sold over 4 million copies. Five singles were released between 1983 and 1984; "Mama" was the lead single and remains the highest charting Genesis single in the UK, reaching No. 4. While "Mama" stalled on the US charts, follow-up single "That's All" reached No. 6 there and became the band's first US top 10 hit. The band toured the album in 1983 and 1984, recordings from which formed the concert video Genesis Live: The Mama Tour. In 1985, the album received a Grammy Award nomination for Best Rock Performance by a Duo or Group with Vocal and "Second Home by the Sea" was nominated for Best Rock Instrumental Performance. In 2007, the album was re-released with new stereo and 5.1 surround sound mixes.

== Background ==
In October 1982, the Genesis line-up of drummer/singer Phil Collins, keyboardist Tony Banks, and guitarist/bassist Mike Rutherford, with live drummer Chester Thompson and live guitarist Daryl Stuermer, wrapped their two-month tour of North America and Europe in support of the band's third live album, Three Sides Live. They had also performed a one-off gig titled Six of the Best with original Genesis frontman and singer Peter Gabriel and former guitarist Steve Hackett to raise funds for Gabriel's world music festival WOMAD after it ran into financial trouble. Genesis then entered a period of inactivity, during which the band pursued their solo projects.

== Writing and recording ==
In the spring of 1983, the band reconvened at their studio, named The Farm in Chiddingfold, Surrey, to start work on a new studio album, their first since Abacab (1981). Genesis became their first album written, recorded, and mixed in its entirety at the studio room; previously they had to write in an adjoining space. Having the group work in their own space without the additional pressure of booking studio time and fees resulted in a more relaxed environment. They were joined by engineer Hugh Padgham, who had also worked on Abacab, but this time carried out production duties themselves with Geoff Callingham offering technical assistance. Mike Rutherford recalled an initial period of slow and sluggish progress, but after a particularly productive session on the third day they had "two or three" songs worked out, which increased their interest and excitement towards the album and in performing the new material on stage. Before the sessions began, the group considered the idea of Tony Banks or Mike Rutherford taking on a lead vocal on the album, but opted out as they had developed material with Phil Collins' voice in mind. Banks stated he and Rutherford took a more prominent role in the backing vocals on Genesis than on previous albums.

Tony Banks explained the album was the result of the group's decision to "write an album and record it in one go, from start to finish". The group considered their strongest material had been put together collectively, so they decided to make an entire album in such a way as opposed to developing someone's pre-arranged ideas. Prior, each member would contribute fully or partially arranged songs, which restricted development or suggestions from the other members. This time tracks came about through jamming and improvisations in the studio that were recorded onto tape, ensuring the band remained unified and the songs were kept fresh. Banks noted that this made recording more exciting and spontaneous. This collaborative effort marked a return for Genesis, crediting each member for writing the album as opposed to listing individual credits, which they had not done since The Lamb Lies Down on Broadway (1974). The collaborative effort also had an influence on the album's title, as the group was unable to come up with a suitable name, so they used Genesis to emphasise the fact that it was written collectively.

The main keyboards that Banks used on the album are the Prophet 10, Synclavier, an E-mu Emulator, a Yamaha CP-70 electric grand piano, and an ARP Quadra on "Mama". At one point on the album, a sample from the soundtrack to 2001: A Space Odyssey (1968) is used. Collins said: "You play a chord and a half of it's going at half the speed and part at twice the speed, sounds beautiful." Collins plays on a Simmons electronic drum kit. Padgham, meanwhile, digitally mixed the album's analog multitracks using a Sony PCM-1610 PCM adaptor.

== Songs ==
Genesis displays the group moving towards shorter, more straightforward, and radio friendly songs. Rutherford said that the band had gone as far as they could with their progressive and art rock direction that they had adopted since the early 1970s and wanted to write and record in a more relaxed approach as previously, the band were more driven to present what they had to offer. Banks considered the music, and overall sound of Genesis, something that the band had longed for many years prior, specifically its more aggressive edge. He described side one as the "main act", while side two has the "character pieces".

=== "Mama" ===
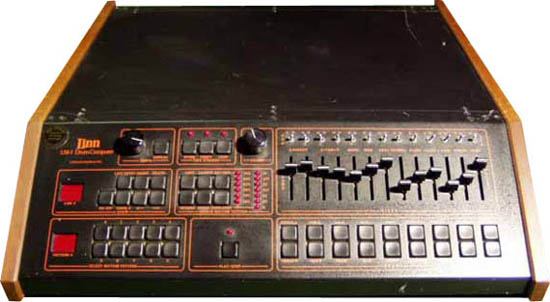
"Mama" features a Linn electronic drum machine

"Mama" originated during a group jam session where Rutherford was experimenting with a Linn LM-1 electronic drum machine fed through a gated reverb and a Mesa/Boogie amplifier, and "turned up incredibly loud" to the point of amplifiers jumping off the studio floor. Collins was influenced to go for a vocal that resembled John Lennon's style on his cover of "Be-Bop-a-Lula" on the song's verses. His laugh was influenced by the 1982 song "The Message" by hip hop band Grandmaster Flash and the Furious Five, which features a similar sound. Padgham had brought the single to the band and upon hearing it, Collins did the laugh during the subsequent improvisation session for "Mama", which the band liked and wished to use in the song. The group had doubts as to whether Collins could recreate the laugh on stage, but he had no problems.

When it came to picking a song as the album's lead single, Rutherford expected Genesis manager Tony Smith and record label staff to pick another track than "Mama", but said "full marks to them, they agreed we should go with something that was a bit different". Rutherford later rated "Mama" as one of the best songs on the album, and was pleased with its commercial performance after the band found singles chart success with a song that represented what Genesis "were all about" at the time. During one session, the band had a koto in the studio, which was recorded through the E-mu Emulator and used as a sample for the song's percussion effect, partly because Banks had tried other options and could not get another sound to fit.

=== Other songs ===
"That's All" originated from Banks's simple piano riff, which was followed by a drum pattern that instantly gave off a mood that the band wanted to develop further. Each member cited the Beatles as an influence for the song; Collins said his drumming was in tribute to the style of their drummer, Ringo Starr, one of his drumming influences. The organ solo is played using a preset on the Synclavier imitating a Hammond B-3 organ, despite the reverse seen in the song's music video.

"Home by the Sea" tells the story of a burglar who breaks into a house only to find it is haunted by ghosts, who capture him and then force him to listen to their life stories. Collins had repeated the phrase "home by the sea" while putting down dummy vocals at a time when Banks was writing lyrical ideas, and used the phrase to conjure up the story. The song originated with the band playing along to their Linn drum machine, during which Banks and Rutherford devised a guide theme on the keyboard and guitar, respectively, and Collins a vocal outline. With the guide parts laid out, the band then had a format as to its mood and how the song would take shape and developed it into a complete track. When the three were happy with what came out from it, they re-recorded the song individually onto tape with Collins replacing the Linn drum tracks with his own.

The former track segues into "Second Home by the Sea", a mostly instrumental piece developed from a group improvisation that began with Collins playing a drum riff which Banks and Rutherford liked and joined in. The working title was "Heavy Simmonds", a reference to Collins' playing. Banks said the group spent around two hours jamming on the idea on one day, followed by a second jam of equal length on the next. They then took the parts from both jams they liked best and organised them into one cohesive arrangement, which required them to re-learn what they had put down to record it as one piece. Banks said the loose idea behind the instrumental section was to represent the former lives of the ghosts. The track ends with a reprise of "Home by the Sea".

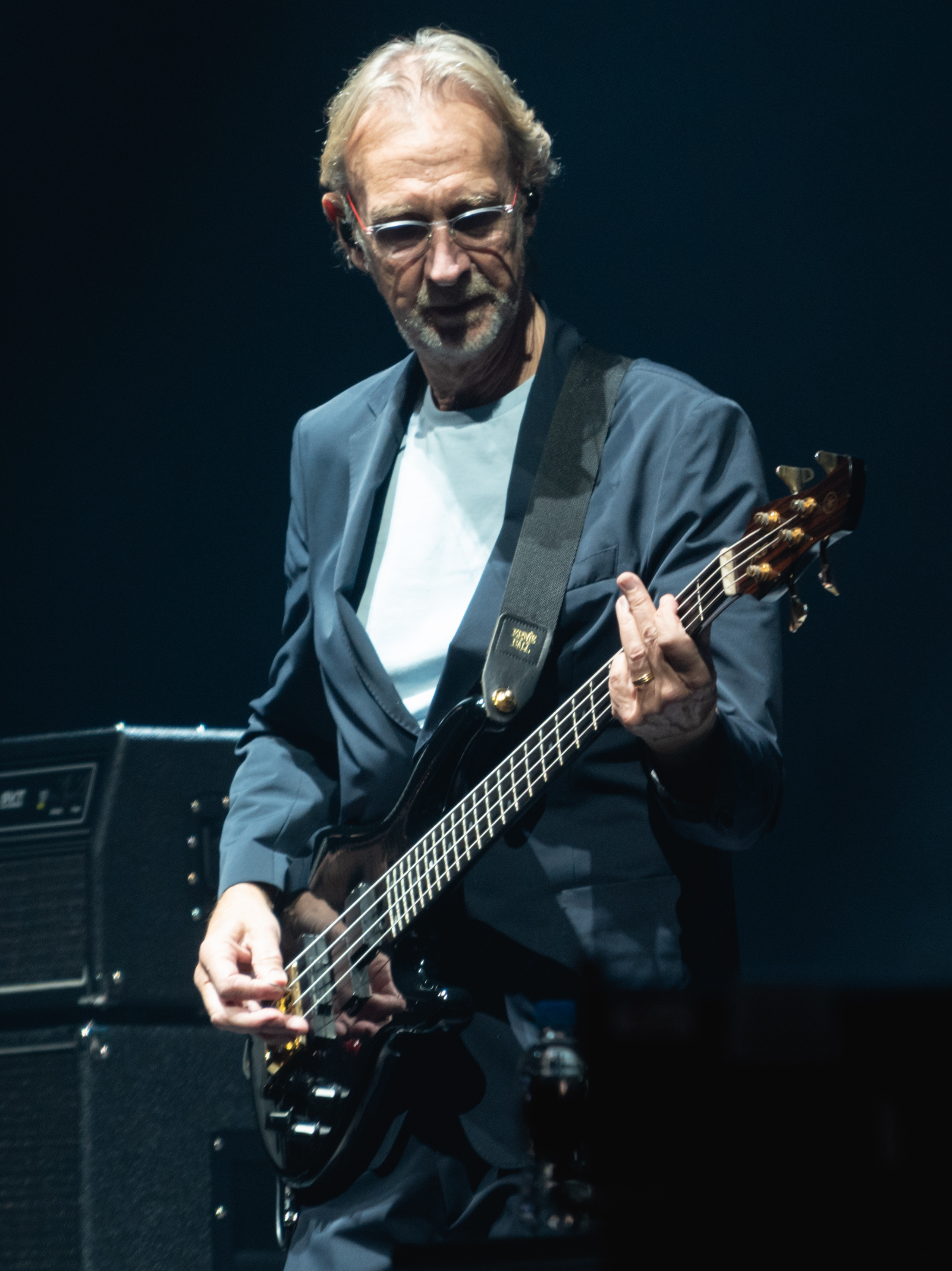
Guitarist/bassist Mike Rutherford wrote the lyrics on side two, except for one track

"Illegal Alien", with lyrics from Rutherford, is about illegal immigrants and their attempts to cross the border into the United States for a better life. Collins aimed for a more adventurous style of drumming and went through a number of different styles, noting what he ended up playing was perhaps more than what the song called for. The chosen style was "that basic rock-and-roll part-two and four on the snare, one and three on the bass. That's what made the tune work". It opens with sound effects of car horns and telephones that Banks played on his E-mu Emulator sampler, which he found particularly exciting to record and incorporate into the music. Collins felt more pleased with his drumming on "Mama" and "Illegal Alien" than on the band's more intricate tracks such as "Los Endos" from A Trick of the Tail. Banks denied any racist implications the song appeared to have towards Mexicans, but said "it is a tongue-in-cheek thing" and in fact more sympathetic towards immigrants.

"Silver Rainbow" has lyrics written by Banks, who wrote about people being senseless when they are in love. Collins described them as "romantic" and "lush". Its working title was "Adam" because it had a rhythm that the group felt resembled something by singer Adam Ant, and the band thought a lyric that matched the "juvenile" music would fit it best.

"It's Gonna Get Better" features a keyboard introduction that Banks sampled from an album of classical music for cello, following a failed attempt to use it to obtain a quality string sound on his keyboard. He then played four notes simultaneously using the same sample that unexpectedly created a sound of interweaving harmonies, which he kept and used.

== Cover art ==
The cover art was designed by English artist Bill Smith, who had also produced the artwork on Abacab (1981). The front photograph originates from shapes from his one-year-old son's shape sorter toy that were left on the carpet after he had gone to bed.

== Release ==
Genesis was released on 3 October 1983 and distributed by Charisma and Virgin Records in the United Kingdom and by Atlantic Records in the United States. It reached No. 1 on the UK Albums Chart for one week from 15 October 1983 during a 51-week stay on the chart, and re-entered the chart for a total of 15 weeks between 1984 and 1987. The album peaked at No. 9 on the Billboard 200 during a 49-week stay. In the United Kingdom, the album reached Gold certification by the British Phonographic Industry on the day of release for shipment of 200,000 copies. In December 1983, the album reached Platinum certification and, in October 1987 reached double Platinum, the latter for selling 600,000 copies.

Four singles from the album were released between August 1983 and June 1984. A 12-inch single was released with longer versions of "Mama" and "It's Gonna Get Better", the edit for the latter containing an extra verse and chorus.

Genesis filmed promotional music videos for "Mama" and "Illegal Alien", both of which were filmed back to back on the same film set.

== Critical reception ==
Professional ratings
Review scores
Source	Rating
AllMusic	3.5/5 stars
Rolling Stone	2/5 stars
The Rolling Stone Album Guide	4/5 stars

In his feature article on the band and the album in a September 1983 edition of Sounds, writer Bill Black described Genesis as "an at times frustrating cocktail of the sassy songwriting" that Collins' solo albums apparently brought into the band's songs, "spiced with tantalizing reminders" of the band's more progressive and art rock past. He was critical of "It's Gonna Get Better", summarising it as "pure formula" and compared its backtracked keyboard sound to "cosmic Elgar", but rated "Mama" as "savage as you're likely to get with post Gabriel Genesis" and a notable departure from their earlier songs. The Kerrang! reviewer determined that for this album Genesis "have traded technical complexity and ingenuity for an altogether more stunning simplicity", making "a Genesis album for people who normally hate Genesis" and "great music for the masses".

In his retrospective review for AllMusic, Stephen Thomas Erlewine criticised the album for lacking coherency, but found that a majority of the tracks are outstanding, "balancing such sleek, pulsating pop tunes as 'That's All' with a newfound touch for aching ballads." He also praised the band completely redefining themselves as a pop group.

In 1985 the album received a Grammy Award nomination for Best Rock Performance by a Duo or Group with Vocal while "Second Home by the Sea" was nominated for Best Rock Instrumental Performance.

Mike Rutherford referred to this album as one of his favourite Genesis albums.

== Track listing ==
All music written by Tony Banks, Phil Collins, and Mike Rutherford. Lyricists as noted.

Side one
No.	Title	Lyrics	Length
1.	"Mama"	Collins	6:52
2.	"That's All"	Collins	4:25
3.	"Home by the Sea"	Banks	5:08
4.	"Second Home by the Sea"	Banks	6:06
Total length:			22:31

Side two
No.	Title	Lyrics	Length
1.	"Illegal Alien"	Rutherford	5:17
2.	"Taking It All Too Hard"	Rutherford	3:58
3.	"Just a Job to Do"	Rutherford	4:47
4.	"Silver Rainbow"	Banks	4:31
5.	"It's Gonna Get Better"	Rutherford	5:14
Total length:			23:47

"It's Gonna Get Better" contains a sample of the opening cello part of a ballet suite written by Aram Khachaturian.

== Personnel ==
Genesis

- Mike Rutherford – guitars, bass, backing vocals
- Phil Collins – drums, vocals, percussion
- Tony Banks – keyboards, backing vocals

Production and artwork

- Genesis – producers
- Hugh Padgham – producer, engineer
- Geoff Callingham – technical assistance
- Tony Smith – manager
- Geoff Banks, Steve Jones, Dale and Clair Newman, Andy Mackrill, Jo Greenwood and all at Hit & Run Music – Without whom department
- Bill Smith – sleeve design
- Chris Peyton – sleeve adaptation (for The Redroom)

== Charts ==
=== Weekly charts ===
Weekly chart performance for Genesis
Chart (1983–84)	Peak position
Australian Albums (Kent Music Report)	41
Austrian Albums (Ö3 Austria)	2
Canada Top Albums/CDs (RPM)	2
Dutch Albums (Album Top 100)	2
Finnish Albums (Suomen virallinen lista)	1
German Albums (Offizielle Top 100)	1
Icelandic Albums (Tónlist)	3
Italian Albums (Musica e dischi)	4
Japanese Albums (Oricon)	24
New Zealand Albums (RMNZ)	2
Norwegian Albums (VG-lista)	2
Spanish Albums (AFYVE)	21
Swedish Albums (Sverigetopplistan)	12
Swiss Albums (Schweizer Hitparade)	2
UK Albums (Official Charts)	1
US Billboard 200	9

=== Year-end charts ===
1983 year-end chart performance for Genesis
Chart (1983)	Position
Canada Top Albums/CDs (RPM)	24
Dutch Albums (Album Top 100)	31
German Albums (Offizielle Top 100)	73
UK Albums (OCC	9

1984 year-end chart performance for Genesis
Chart (1984)	Position
Canada Top Albums/CDs (RPM)	25
German Albums (Offizielle Top 100)	16
New Zealand Albums (RMNZ)	25
Swiss Albums (Schweizer Hitparade)	15
UK Albums (OCC)	76
US Billboard 200	34

1985 year-end chart performance for Genesis
Chart (1985)	Position
New Zealand Albums (RMNZ)	37

1986 year-end chart performance for Genesis
Chart (1986)	Position
New Zealand Albums (RMNZ)	25

1987 year-end chart performance for Genesis
Chart (1987)	Position
New Zealand Albums (RMNZ)	10

== Certifications ==
Certifications for Genesis
Region	Certification	Certified units/sales
Belgium (BRMA)	Gold	25,000^{*}
France (SNEP)	Platinum	300,000^{*}
Germany (BVMI)	Platinum	500,000^{^}
Japan (RIAJ)	Gold	100,000^{^}
Netherlands (NVPI)	Gold	50,000^{^}
New Zealand (RMNZ)	Platinum	15,000^{^}
Norway (IFPI Norway)	Gold	50,000
Switzerland (IFPI Switzerland)	2× Platinum	100,000^{^}
United Kingdom (BPI)	2× Platinum	600,000^{^}
United States (RIAA)	4× Platinum	4,000,000^{^}
^{*} Sales figures based on certification alone.^{^} Shipments figures based on certification alone.
