= That's All (Genesis song) =

1983 single by Genesis

- Variant sleeve revealing the side-A label (solid centre edition pictured)

Single by Genesis

from the album Genesis
- B-side: "Taking It All Too Hard" (UK); "Second Home by the Sea" (U.S.)
- Released: 31 October 1983
- Recorded: 1983
- Genre: Pop; new wave
- Length: 4:23
- Label: Atlantic, Virgin, MCA
- Songwriters: Phil Collins, Tony Banks, Mike Rutherford
- Lyricist: Phil Collins
- Producers: Genesis, Hugh Padgham

Genesis singles chronology
"Mama" (1983)	"That's All" (1983)	"Home by the Sea" (1983)

Music video
- "That's All" on YouTube

"That's All" is a song by the English rock band Genesis. It is a group composition and appears as the second track on their self-titled album (1983). It was the album's second single after "Mama". On June 17, 1993, MCA Records re-issued the song as a CD and "HiQ" cassette single.

The U.S. single reached No. 6 in early 1984, making it their first Billboard Hot 100 Top 10 hit; it included "Second Home by the Sea" as the B-side. The UK single featured "Taking It All Too Hard" as the flipside, and reached No. 16. Also released was a 12-inch single that included a live version of "Firth of Fifth" from 1981.

As the band's first break into the Billboard Hot 100 Top 10, the song is included in Rock Song Index: The 7500 Most Important Songs for the Rock and Roll Era.

== Background and recording ==
The song was intended as an attempt to write a simple pop song with a melody in the style of the Beatles. Phil Collins acknowledged in a subsequent interview that the song also features one of his attempts at a "Ringo Starr drum part".

The song begins with Tony Banks playing the main riff of the song on a Yamaha CP-70 electric grand piano. The other keyboards used on this song are a Sequential Circuits Prophet-10 for organ pads and a Synclavier II for the organ solo in the middle section. The coda lapses into a guitar solo played by Mike Rutherford, as the drum beat intensifies, before the song fades away.

== Reception ==
Cash Box said that "a light production touch uses a bouncy piano and keyboard foundation and makes for a moving tune, though there's no movement in the relationship described."

== Music video ==
The video depicts the band as homeless men taking shelter outside a disused factory. They perform the song, eat soup, play cards, and keep warm around an open fire. It was the first time Genesis used director Jim Yukich, who would direct the majority of their next videos as well as many of Collins's solo videos.

== Live performances ==
The song was played live during the Mama, Invisible Touch, We Can't Dance, and Calling All Stations (with Ray Wilson on vocals) Tours. The song was played only during the first few shows of the Calling All Stations tour, before being discarded. Wilson has performed the song on solo tours.

A live version appears on the albums The Way We Walk, Volume One: The Shorts, and their DVD Genesis Live at Wembley Stadium, as well as their home video The Mama Tour. An instrumental jazz version of the song appears on the live album A Hot Night in Paris by The Phil Collins Big Band.

The first verse of the song is also part of the "Old Medley" featured on The Way We Walk, Volume Two: The Longs and The Way We Walk – Live in Concert.

A more stripped-down version of the song was brought back as part of an acoustic set for The Last Domino? tour.

== Personnel ==
- Phil Collins – drums, percussion, vocals
- Tony Banks – Yamaha CP-70, Prophet-10, Synclavier II
- Mike Rutherford – guitars, bass

== Chart performance ==
=== Weekly charts ===
Chart (1983–1984)	Peak position
Australia (Kent Music Report)	62
Austria (Ö3 Austria Top 40)	19
Canada RPM Top Singles	14
Canada RPM Adult Contemporary	2
Irish Singles Chart	6
Netherlands (Single Top 100)	37
Switzerland (Schweizer Hitparade)	15
UK Singles (Official Charts)	16
Uruguay (UPI)	7
US Billboard Hot 100	6
US Adult Contemporary (Billboard)	7
Venezuela (UPI)	6
West Germany (GfK)	27

=== Year-end charts ===
Chart (1984)	Position
US Billboard Hot 100	52
US Adult Contemporary (Billboard)	44
US Cash Box Top 100	81

== Certifications ==
Region	Certification	Certified units/sales
New Zealand (RMNZ)	Platinum	30,000^{‡}
United Kingdom (BPI)	Silver	200,000^{‡}
^{‡} Sales+streaming figures based on certification alone.

== Cover version ==
- Canadian country music group Doc Walker covered the song on their 2008 album Beautiful Life. It was released as the second single from the project and peaked at No. 68 on the Canadian Hot 100.
