= The Mama Tour =

Genesis Live: The Mama Tour
- Directed by: Jim Yukich
- Release date: October 1985
- Running time: 102 minutes
- Language: English

Genesis Live: The Mama Tour is a concert film by the English progressive rock band Genesis, released for home video on 17 October 1985 by Virgin Music Video and on 27 June 1986 by Atlantic Records. It contains highlights from the group's five concerts at the National Exhibition Centre in Birmingham, the video was filmed on 26, 27 and 28 February 1984 at the end of their Mama Tour, supporting their 1983 album Genesis. It was directed by Jim Yukich.

== Background ==
Two-thirds of the group's then current eponymous album appears on this video: the singles "Mama", "That's All", "Illegal Alien", "It's Gonna Get Better" (the B-side of "Mama"), and the two-piece suite "Home by the Sea/Second Home by the Sea".

Two singles from the previous album Abacab are also performed ("Keep It Dark" and the title track), and the set is rounded off with a medley of songs from their 1970s period, and the stage favourite "Turn It On Again". The latter song diverges into a medley of well-known songs by artists from bygone years, while the "In the Cage" suite includes extracts from "The Cinema Show", "...In That Quiet Earth", and the "Raven" section from "The Colony of Slippermen".

The tracks that were not included on the video that were performed at the shows were the show's opening track "Dodo/Lurker", the "Eleventh Earl of Mar/The Lamb Lies Down on Broadway/Firth of Fifth/The Musical Box" medley, "The Carpet Crawlers", "Follow You Follow Me" and "Los Endos".

The artwork incorporates aspects of the sleeves from the "Mama" single and the album Genesis, and also gives a nod to the light show for which the band was well known.

The Mama Tour was released on DVD, with 5.1 DTS and Dolby Digital sound, in November 2009 as part of the Genesis Movie Box 1981–2007 DVD set.

== Track listing ==
1. "Abacab"
2. "That's All"
3. "Mama"
4. "Illegal Alien"
5. "Home by the Sea"
6. "Second Home by the Sea"
7. "Keep It Dark"
8. "It's Gonna Get Better"
9. Medley: "In the Cage"/"The Cinema Show"/"Afterglow" (Also contains snippets of "...In That Quiet Earth", "Riding the Scree", and "Raven")
10. "Turn It On Again – Final Medley"

== Personnel ==
- Phil Collins – drums, lead vocals
- Tony Banks – keyboards, backing vocals
- Mike Rutherford – guitar, bass, backing vocals
- Daryl Stuermer – guitar, bass, backing vocals
- Chester Thompson – drums

== Certifications ==
Region	Certification	Certified units/sales
United States (RIAA)	Gold	50,000^{^}
^{^} Shipments figures based on certification alone.

== Notes ==
Tony Banks has stated in interviews, he was not fond of his keyboards setup in between the drum sets on stage. This tour was the only tour where his keyboards were set up like this.
