= It's in Your Eyes =

Single by Phil Collins

from the album Dance into the Light
- B-side: "Always"; "I Don't Want to Go"; "Easy Lover"; "Separate Lives"
- Released: 2 December 1996
- Genre: Jangle pop
- Length: 3:02
- Label: Atlantic; Virgin; WEA
- Songwriter: Phil Collins
- Producers: Phil Collins; Hugh Padgham

Phil Collins singles chronology
"Dance into the Light" (1996)	"It's in Your Eyes" (1996)	"No Matter Who" (1996)

Music video
- "Phil Collins - It's In Your Eyes (Official Music Video)" on YouTube

"It's in Your Eyes" is a single performed by Phil Collins and released in 1996 as the second single from his album Dance into the Light.

A Beatles-like melody, both melodically and lyrically - closing mirroring the Beatles song, "Any Time at All", the song reached No. 30 UK Singles Chart and No. 77 on the U.S. Billboard Hot 100. It also reached the top 10 on the Billboard Hot Adult Contemporary Tracks chart.

For promotional live performances of the song, Collins played the lead guitar instead of Daryl Stuermer. The video showed Collins in an apartment block, playing the guitar while watching people pass by through their flats.

== Track listings ==
=== Version 1 ===
1. "It's in Your Eyes" – 3:02
2. "Always" (Bigband Live At Montreux 1996) – 4:52
3. "I Don't Want to Go" – 2:51

=== Version 2 ===
1. "It's in Your Eyes" – 3:02
2. "Easy Lover" (Recorded Live '94 From The Board Official Bootleg) – 5:01
3. "Separate Lives" (Recorded Live '94 From The Board Official Bootleg) – 6:15

== Personnel ==
- Phil Collins – drums, vocals, keyboards, lead and rhythm guitars
- Daryl Stuermer – rhythm guitar
- Ronnie Caryl – rhythm guitar
- Nathan East – bass

== Charts ==
=== Weekly charts ===
Chart (1996–1997)	Peak position
Australian Singles Chart	74
Canada Top Singles (RPM)	14
Estonia (Eesti Top 20)	8
UK Singles (Official Charts)	30
UK Airplay (Music Week)	30
US Billboard Hot 100	77
US Adult Contemporary (Billboard)	8

=== Year-end charts ===
Chart (1997)	Position
Canada Top Singles (RPM)	91

== Notes ==
- "It's in Your Eyes" Version 1 at Discogs
- "It's in Your Eyes" Version 2 at Discogs
