= Yamaha CP-70 =

Electric piano by Yamaha

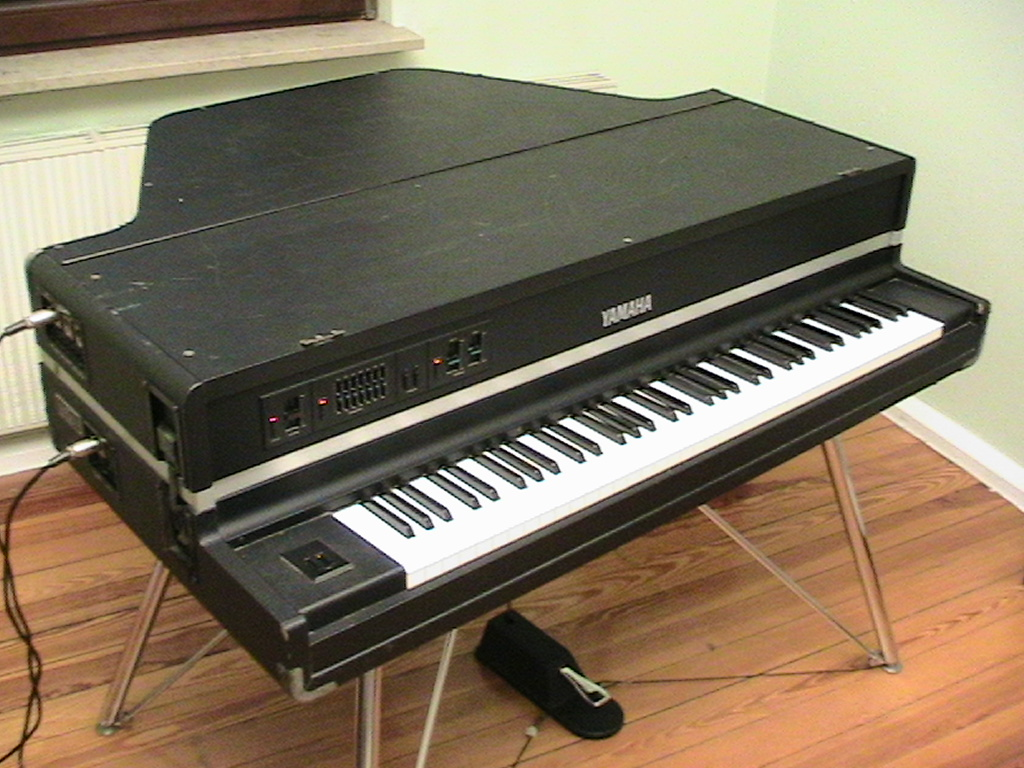
- Manufacturer: Yamaha Corporation
- Dates: 1976–1985

Technical specifications
- Polyphony: Full
- Synthesis type: Electromechanical

Input/output
- Keyboard: 73 keys (CP-70, CP-70B); 88 keys (CP-80)

The Yamaha CP-70 is an electric grand piano manufactured by Yamaha Corporation between 1976 and 1985. The instrument was based on earlier electric piano technology, but took advantage of improved pickups along with the company's longstanding experience in manufacturing acoustic pianos.

The new technology and a lack of a soundboard gave it a more accurate emulation of an acoustic piano than earlier models. It was well received and used by a number of musicians in the late 1970s and early 1980s, including the Grateful Dead's Keith Godchaux and Genesis' Tony Banks. It continues to be used in the 21st century by a number of artists, and it is still possible to buy replacement parts.

== Features ==
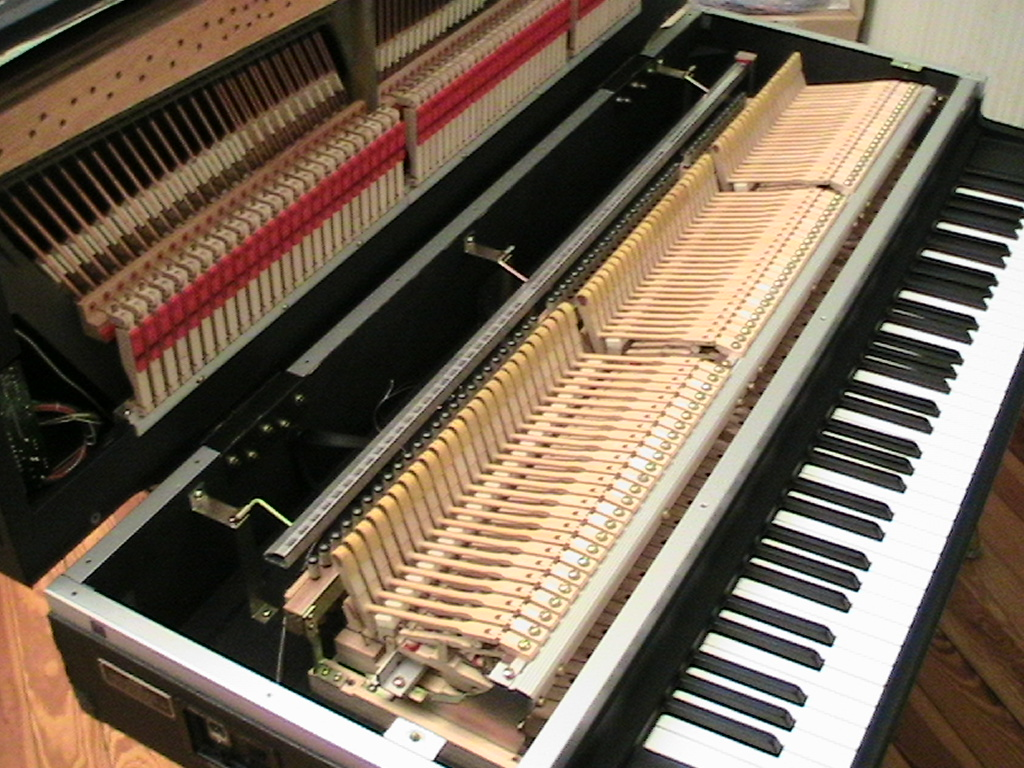
Internal view of the piano

The CP-70 has the same piano action as an acoustic instrument, using wooden keys to operate hammers that hit strings, but it does not contain a soundboard. It has a smaller number of specially manufactured strings, reducing the overall weight. In particular, the bass strings are very short compared to an acoustic instrument, 26 3/4 inches (67.9 cm) instead of around 7 feet (213 cm)). The strings are amplified by piezo-electric pickups mounted on the harp casting that induce an electric current from vibrations, in a similar manner to pickups on an acoustic guitar.

The choice of piezo-electric pickups and their mounting position avoids the problems with earlier electric pianos, where magnetic pickups carried harmonic information at a particular distance on the string. The lack of a soundboard means it is difficult for the instrument to feedback. The signal from the pickups is sent to a preamplifier that features a stereo balanced line signal via a pair of XLR connector output jacks, in addition to the more familiar quarter-inch jack outputs.

The CP-70 is designed for touring. The harp can be detached from the key assembly and the instrument's legs and can be stored in the key assembly's lid. An optional road case is available. The CP-70's flat top allows other keyboards and synthesisers to be stacked on top of it.

== Background ==
There had been numerous attempts to manufacture a piano that was both portable and sounded like the acoustic grand model. Benjamin Miessner had been working on pickup and amplification techniques since the 1930s, and discovered that capturing the harmonic information and nuances of sound was difficult and changed as pickup positions and configurations were altered. Yamaha had been working on pickup technology since World War II, and took advantage of Japanese culture at the time, which permitted research information to be exchanged between companies without threat of intellectual property lawsuits, as in the US. They used this knowledge to create a series of robust piezo-electric pickups, and combined it with their experience in manufacturing acoustic pianos to make an electric instrument.

The CP-70 was first manufactured in 1976, and cost $4,000. According to Toto's David Paich, Yamaha invited a group of pianists in Los Angeles to test the instrument before manufacturing. After playing, they were "just freaking out over it". The first model had problems with tuning, and an upgraded version, the CP-70B, was introduced at the NAMM Show in 1978, along with the CP-80, which featured a full 88-note keyboard. It also introduced an effects loop. The CP-70D and CP-80D models added a graphic equaliser. The final models to be released were the MIDI equipped CP-70M and CP-80M, which were released at the end of 1985.

== Maintenance ==
The CP-70B and later models have very stable tuning, compared to other electric pianos. The lack of a soundboard means that vibration from transport and humidity is unlikely to change the sound.

Because the CP-70 uses custom-made strings, sourcing new ones can be problematic. Each iteration of the instrument used a different type of string, although some of the treble strings can be replaced with standard ones from an acoustic piano. As of 2019, there were two companies in the US supplying the appropriate custom strings for the CP-70.

== Notable users ==
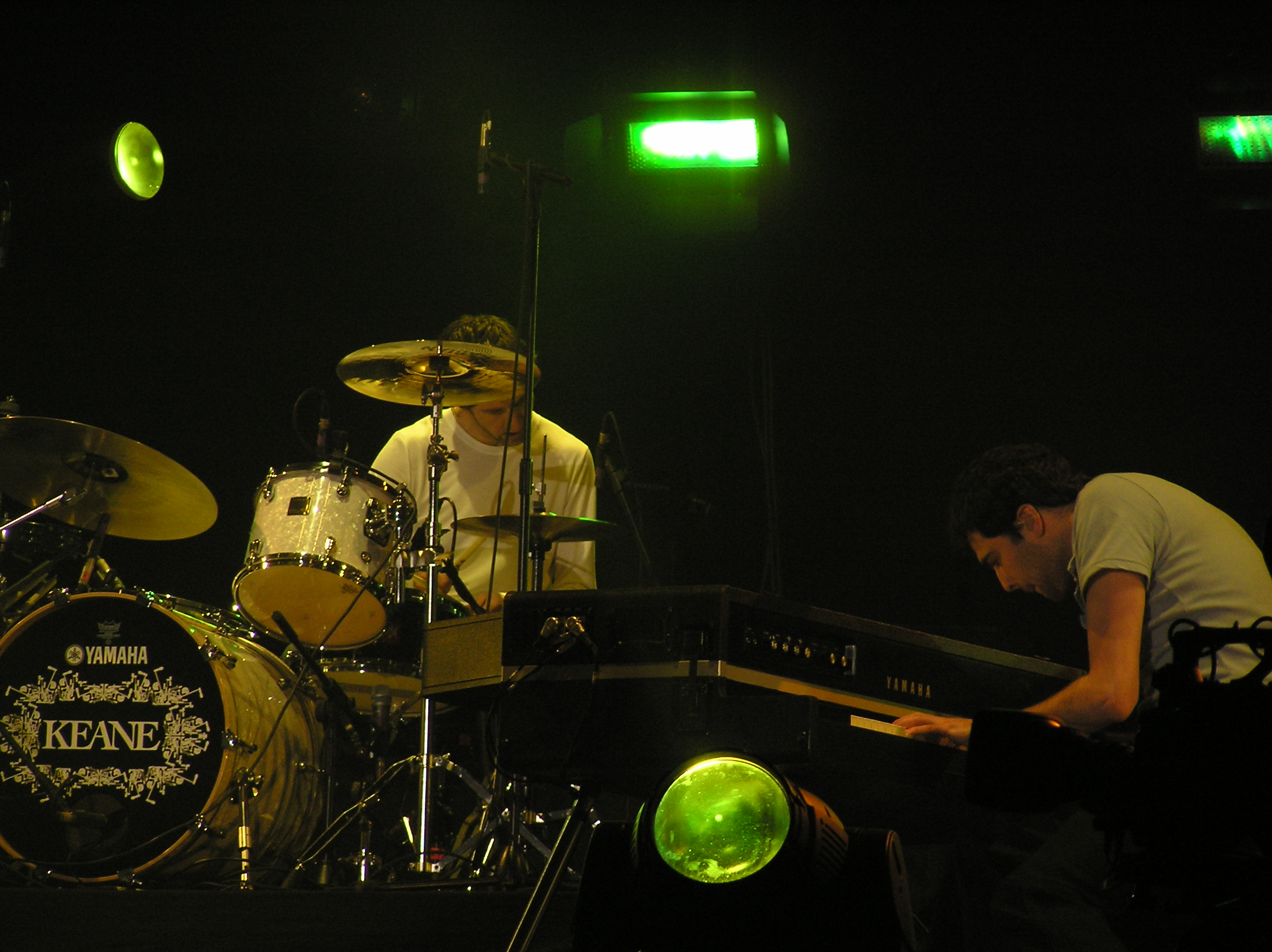
Keane using a Yamaha CP-70 onstage

The CP-70 was used by a number of prominent keyboardists, including Keith Emerson, George Duke, Charly Garcia, Little Feat's Bill Payne, Heart's Howard Leese, Patrick Moraz, Michael McDonald, Magne Furuholmen of A-ha, Sébastien Tellier and Billy Joel. During Cold Chisel's live performances, singer Jimmy Barnes leapt onto keyboardist Don Walker's CP-70. The Grateful Dead's Keith Godchaux began playing a CP-70 as it was easier to transport one to gigs than an acoustic grand piano. His successor Brent Mydland also briefly used it in 1982 before switching to digital synthesizers. Led Zeppelin's John Paul Jones encased a CP-70 inside a white case to resemble an acoustic piano. Genesis' Tony Banks used the instrument extensively, such as the hit "That's All" and "Taking It All Too Hard", and preferred recording with it over an acoustic piano. Former Genesis frontman Peter Gabriel was also a frequent user of the CP-70, among other things featuring it on his hit single "In Your Eyes". The welsh avant-garde musician John Cale used the CP-80 version to record the album Songs for Drella and often toured with the keyboard during the 1980s and 1990s. Cameron Winter of the band Geese also used the piano more recently.

The CP-70 achieved its commercial peak during the advent of MTV and was therefore prominently featured on music videos. Keane's Tim Rice-Oxley uses a CP-70 as his main instrument with the band. Alicia Keys has used a CP-70 as her main touring piano, which she custom-painted. During the tour for The Element of Freedom, her CP-70 featured the words "Freedom" and "Love" painted on its side.
