= Home by the Sea =

- Dutch single

Single by Genesis

from the album Genesis
- Released: 1983
- Genre: Progressive rock
- Length: 11:14 (5:08 and 6:06); 4:46 (single version)
- Label: Vertigo
- Composers: Tony Banks, Phil Collins, Mike Rutherford
- Lyricist: Tony Banks
- Producers: Genesis, Hugh Padgham

Genesis singles chronology
"That's All" (1983)	"Home by the Sea" (1983)	"Illegal Alien" (1984)

"Home by the Sea" and "Second Home by the Sea" is a suite of two songs by English rock band Genesis. It first appeared on their eponymous album in 1983. The lyrics were written by keyboardist Tony Banks and the music was written by the whole band. Lyrically, the song is about a burglar who breaks into a house only to find it is haunted. The burglar is captured by the ghosts, who force him to listen to their stories for the rest of his life. "Home by the Sea" became a chart hit in New Zealand, peaking at number four in November 1986.

== Background ==
The piece was written at a point in Genesis' career when they were transitioning from progressive rock to a more streamlined, new style. As such, it combines simple pop hooks with an extended section more characteristic of progressive rock into one two-part piece. Played together, "Home by the Sea" and "Second Home by the Sea" are over eleven minutes long.

In an interview, Phil Collins noted the track as an example of how the band often recorded songs without playing together as a group. Using a prerecorded drum machine as initial background, the band members would first produce 'guide' parts (such as vocal or guitar) to settle on the format of the song, and later rerecord them for final compilation into the song, adding 'real' drum parts as well.

== Single release and video ==
Originally released as a single in 1983, "Home by the Sea" did not experience chart success until three years later, when it charted in New Zealand and peaked at number four on the RIANZ Singles Chart. In Australia, the song reached number 80 on the Kent Music Report the following year. The song received a promotional video, which was shot at Reunion Arena, in Dallas, Texas on 21 January 1984, with Phil Collins remaining on the drumkit for the last vocal part. "Second Home by the Sea" also appeared much later in a slightly edited form (minus vocals) on the enhanced CD version of the single "Congo" released 14 years later in 1997.

== Live performances ==
The song was played live during the Mama, Invisible Touch, The Way We Walk, Calling All Stations (with Ray Wilson on vocals), Turn It On Again, and The Last Domino? tours. Live versions have also appeared on the DVDs Genesis Live at Wembley Stadium, The Way We Walk - Live in Concert and When in Rome 2007 as well as the home video The Mama Tour. During the Calling All Stations and Turn It On Again tours, the song was transposed to a lower key to account for Genesis' replacement for Collins as lead singer, Ray Wilson's deeper voice for Calling All Stations, and the weakening of Phil Collins's voice in the years preceding his return for the Turn It On Again tour. The "Second Home by the Sea" section, being mostly instrumental, was performed in its original key, including the brief vocal part near the end of the song.

== Personnel ==
- Tony Banks – keyboards
- Phil Collins – drums, percussion, vocals, Simmons drums
- Mike Rutherford – guitars, bass

== Charts ==
Chart (1986–1987)	Peak position
Australia (Kent Music Report)	80
New Zealand (Recorded Music NZ)	4
