= No Matter Who =

Single by Phil Collins

from the album Dance into the Light
- B-side: "In the Air Tonight"; "Both Sides of the Story"
- Released: 3 February 1997
- Genre: Rock
- Label: Atlantic; Virgin; WEA
- Songwriter: Phil Collins
- Producers: Phil Collins; Hugh Padgham

Phil Collins singles chronology
"It's in Your Eyes" (1996)	"No Matter Who" (1997)	"Wear My Hat" (1997)

Music video
- "Phil Collins - No Matter Who (Official Music Video)" on YouTube

"No Matter Who" is a song by Phil Collins released as the third single from his album Dance into the Light. The single received only a limited release across the world.

A music video was made for the song, showing a half-sized Collins, his supporting band, and the audience playing the song live on television.

The other two tracks on the CD single are "In the Air Tonight" and "Both Sides of the Story," both recorded for MTV Europe Unplugged.

== Track listing ==
1. "No Matter Who"
2. "In the Air Tonight" (MTV Europe Unplugged)
3. "Both Sides of the Story" (MTV Europe Unplugged)

== Charts ==
Chart (1997)	Peak position
Estonia (Eesti Top 20)	3
German Singles Chart	69

== Credits ==
- Phil Collins – drums, vocals, keyboards, rhythm guitar, slide guitar
- Ronnie Caryl – rhythm guitar, lead guitar solo
- Nathan East – bass

== Notes ==
- No Matter Who at Discogs
