= A Hot Night in Paris =

Live album by The Phil Collins Big Band
- Released: 18 May 1999
- Recorded: "Pick Up The Pieces" at Stravinski Auditorium, Montreux, Switzerland, 14 July 1998; Rest of the Album at Le Grand Rex, Paris, France, 21 July 1998
- Length: 70:56
- Label: Atlantic
- Producer: Don Murray, Daryl Stuermer

Phil Collins chronology
...Hits (1998)	A Hot Night in Paris (1999)	Tarzan: An Original Walt Disney Records Soundtrack (1999)

A Hot Night in Paris is the only album by the Phil Collins Big Band, released in 1999 by Atlantic Records. Fronted by Genesis lead singer/drummer Phil Collins, the album did not contain any singing. Instead, the album consisted of big band renditions of primarily Collins and Genesis songs, with Collins remaining at the drums.

The album did not chart on the Billboard 200, although it did reach No. 3 on the jazz album chart.

== Track listing ==
No.	Title	Writer(s)	Length
1.	"Sussudio"	Phil Collins	6:52
2.	"That's All"	Tony Banks; Collins; Mike Rutherford	5:34
3.	"Invisible Touch"	Banks; Collins; Rutherford	5:42
4.	"Hold on My Heart"	Banks; Collins; Rutherford	6:36
5.	"Chips & Salsa"	Gerald Albright	5:23
6.	"I Don't Care Anymore"	Collins	6:05
7.	"Milestones"	Miles Davis	6:34
8.	"Against All Odds (Take a Look at Me Now)"	Collins	5:04
9.	"Pick Up the Pieces"	Roger Ball; Hamish Stuart; Average White Band	12:41
10.	"The Los Endos Suite"	Banks; Collins; Steve Hackett; Rutherford	10:25
Total length:			70:56

The 2019 remaster has "Hold on My Heart" and "Chips & Salsa" swapped.

== Personnel ==
=== Musicians ===
- Saxophones
  - Matt James (alto), Gerald Albright (alto), Chris Collins (tenor), Larry Panella (tenor), Ian Nevins (tenor), Kevin Sheehan (baritone)
- Trombones:
  - Arturo Velasco, Scott Bliege, Mark Bettcher, Antonio García
- Trumpets:
  - Dan Fornero, Harry Kim, Tito Carillo, Al Hood, Ron Modell
- Rhythm section:
  - Daryl Stuermer (guitar), Brad Cole (piano, keyboards), George Duke (piano on "Pick up the Pieces"), Doug Richeson (bass), Luis Conte (percussion), Phil Collins (drums, band leader)

=== Technical ===
- Don Murray – producer, mixing, mastering
- Daryl Stuermer – producer
- Phil Collins – oversaw production
- Pete Doell – assistant engineer
- Dann Thompson – assistant engineer
- Greg Burns – assistant engineer
- Mauricio Guerrero – live recording engineer
- Christophe Suchet – live recording engineer
- Dinemec Mobile Studio – recording
- Robert Vosgien – mastering
- Wherefore Art? – cover design
- Sian Rance – illustration

== Acknowledgements ==
"It was 1966 when I first heard the Buddy Rich Swinging New Big Band. All the other things I was listening to at the time had to move over and make room for this wonderful noise I had discovered. I went searching for more and discovered Count Basie with Sonny Payne, Harold Jones and Jo Jones... then Duke Ellington and so many more. I decided that, one day, I'd have to have a go myself and form my own big band.

Thirty years later I did it. In 1996 I toured Europe with Quincy Jones conducting and Tony Bennett as our guest vocalist and my band. I was in Heaven.

Having dived in, I couldn't wait to do it again. In 1998 I took the band out again and toured the United States and Europe. We recorded some shows and the result is here to listen to. For me it's a labour of love. I'm back where I belong, behind the drums, playing music I'm proud of with some wonderful musicians. I hope it moves you as it does me. If it does, come and see us sometime."

Luv

Phil Collins

== Chart performance ==
Year	Chart	Position
1999	Top Jazz Albums	3

== Reception ==
- AllMusic
- Q
