= Dance into the Light =

Studio album by Phil Collins
- Released: 21 October 1996
- Recorded: 1995–1996 in France using mobile studio equipment
- Genres: Rock; pop; worldbeat
- Length: 60:33
- Labels: Atlantic, Face Value
- Producers: Phil Collins; Hugh Padgham

Phil Collins chronology
Both Sides (1993)	Dance into the Light (1996)	...Hits (1998)

Singles from Dance into the Light
- 1. "Dance into the Light" Released: 17 September 1996; 2. "It's in Your Eyes" Released: 2 December 1996; 3. "No Matter Who" Released: 3 February 1997; 4. "Wear My Hat" Released: 27 May 1997; 5. "The Same Moon" Released: 20 October 1997 (Germany)

Dance into the Light is the sixth studio album by the English drummer and singer-songwriter Phil Collins, released on 21 October 1996 in the United Kingdom by Face Value Records. It features guest backing vocals from some of Collins' touring accompanists, including Arnold McCuller and Amy Keys. It was the first album that Collins released as a full-time solo artist, having left Genesis earlier that year. It was also the first album released on Face Value Records.

The album was received negatively by the majority of music critics and under-performed commercially. It reached No. 23 on the US Billboard 200 and was Collins' poorest-selling album at the time (only 2002's Testify and 2010's Going Back sold fewer copies and charted lower). Dance into the Light was certified gold in the U.S. The album was Collins' first to not contain any American Top 40 hits, with the title track only reaching No. 45 (although it cracked the top 10 in the UK). However, five singles were issued from Dance into the Light: "Dance into the Light", "It's in Your Eyes", "No Matter Who", "Wear My Hat", and "The Same Moon". The former two singles were the only singles to make the Top 40, in the UK.

Despite the disappointing sales of the album, Collins' subsequent U.S. tour in support of the album, titled The Trip into the Light World Tour, was one of the highest-performing tours of the year, regularly selling out arenas across the country. This album also marked the studio debut of the Vine Street Horns, who had replaced the Phenix Horns on the Both Sides of the World Tour. Collins would not chart again with an American Top 40 single until 1999's "You'll Be in My Heart", the main single from Disney's animated feature, Tarzan.

== Background and writing ==
In May 1995, Collins wrapped his Both Sides of the World Tour in support of his 1993 album, Both Sides. During the tour he announced his separation from his second wife, Jill Tavelman, and his intention to file for divorce, which finalised in 1996. By this time, Collins's relationship with Orianne Cevey, who later became his third wife, had a positive change in his overall well-being. These events, plus the influence he had from listening to Youssou N'Dour, Bob Dylan, and African music while on tour, influenced ideas for songs that Collins had for a follow-up album. Unlike his recent material, Collins found himself writing more up-tempo and songs focused on rhythm.

After putting down some early ideas while touring, Collins did not revisit the new material until he started work on a new album in his home in Switzerland, at the end of 1995. In a contrast to his usual method of songwriting, Collins deliberately wrote the songs on the album with greater use of the guitar and less on keyboards. Despite not being a guitarist, Collins used guitar samples which dramatically altered the way he approached a song. Before the songs were fully arranged, Collins had decided to bring in a producer so he could take a break from the material and leave them to their duties later. This marked a change as for Both Sides he found himself "living, breathing and sort of dying" with the material and recorded and produced the album himself. For Dance into the Light, Collins hired Hugh Padgham, who had co-produced most of Collins's solo studio output and had worked with him with Genesis.

He thought that having the word "Dance" in the title was something different that would make people curious as to what the album might be like. Another title that he liked was Out of the Woods.

An interview with Collins detailing the making of the album was recorded in Geneva in August 1996 and released on a separate disc.

In his 2016 autobiography Not Dead Yet, Collins stated that he was inspired by the new at the time Britpop scene to write "guitar songs". After the album's release Collins and his wife Orianne Cevey met Oasis guitarist Noel Gallagher who had slagged Collins off previously and referred to him as the "anti-christ of music". Gallagher and his then wife had seen the music video for "It's in Your Eyes", in which Collins played a guitar he borrowed from Paul McCartney, criticised Collins for posing as a guitarist: they informed him that he "wasn't fooling anyone", though Collins stated it was not his intention and that it just felt good. On television show Room 101 in 2005, Collins spoke about Oasis, describing the Gallagher brothers as "horrible guys", "rude" and "not as talented as they think they are", but praised the band itself for their music, claiming to have heard the music before he found out what they were like as people.

== Recording ==
The album was recorded in a chateau in France that Collins rented during the off season. He wished to return home while making the album, so a mobile studio owned by Sting was used to allow recording on location. In the liner notes, Collins stated that he removed all the drum machine parts from the music and performed on a real set of drums. This was following the disappointment he had learned from listeners who were expecting to hear more of his drum work on Both Sides. He said that playing on a real kit made the music more lively as a result.

The album features more musicians as opposed to Both Sides, which saw Collins as the sole performer. Collins wanted them to either play what he had outlined on the demo or build on the original part. His longtime friend Ronnie Caryl, who had played with him in the late 1960s as a member of Flaming Youth, started playing rhythm guitar over the demos which gave it "an edge" because of his "very rough character".

"Dance into the Light" was the only song from the album to appear on Collins' ...Hits collection. "The Times They Are a-Changin'" is a cover of the Bob Dylan song.

== 2016 reissue ==
In 2016, Dance into the Light was reissued as a Deluxe Edition as part of Collins's remastered album campaign. Each album features updated artwork with Collins adopting the same poses and expressions that he did on the originals. He maintained that the new artwork for Dance into the Light was in fact real, "so spot on that people will think it's Photoshopped." The booklet and artwork includes a strip film of Collins attempting the various positions to prove it was genuine.

== Release and reception ==
Professional ratings
Review scores
Source	Rating
AllMusic	2.5/5 stars
Billboard	(favorable)
Entertainment Weekly	C+
The Guardian	2/5 stars
Music Week	4/5 stars
PopMatters	3/10 stars

In its 7 September 1996 edition of the publication, Music Week reported that East West would promote Dance into the Light by launching a series of television ads beginning in October. They mentioned that 60% of all marketing for the album would be spent on television ads that year, which would increase to a rate of 70% the following year. Promotional efforts also included 48-sheet billboards and British Rail posters.

Reviewing for AllMusic, critic Stephen Thomas Erlewine wrote of the album "his polyrhythms are surprisingly stiff for a drummer, which sinks all of the more experimental tracks. The remainder of the album is pleasant, but offers no distinctive melodies, which means that the albums sounds fine while it's on, but leaves nothing behind once it's finished."

Entertainment Weekly critic David Browne wrote, "Despite the sonic overhaul, the music feels less experimental than it does derivative. The world-music tracks are, ironically, watered-down versions of the work of his former band mate Peter Gabriel, and 'Wear My Hat' is an outright Xerox of Paul Simon's 'I Know What I Know', but with cutesy lyrics about groupies."

== Track listing ==
All tracks are written by Phil Collins, except where noted.

No.	Title	Writer(s)	Length
1.	"Dance into the Light"		4:23
2.	"That's What You Said"		4:22
3.	"Lorenzo"	Michaela Odone; Collins	5:52
4.	"Just Another Story"		6:24
5.	"Love Police"		4:08
6.	"Wear My Hat"		4:33
7.	"It's in Your Eyes"		3:01
8.	"Oughta Know by Now"		5:27
9.	"Take Me Down"		3:21
10.	"The Same Moon"		4:13
11.	"River So Wide"		4:55
12.	"No Matter Who"		4:47
13.	"The Times They Are a-Changin'"	Bob Dylan	5:07

Extra Moves bonus disc (Disc two of 2016 deluxe edition)
No.	Title	Length
1.	"Dance into the Light" (live 2004)	4:41
2.	"Just Another Story" (live 1997)	6:20
3.	"Wear My Hat" (live 2004)	4:59
4.	"River So Wide" (live 1997)	4:58
5.	"Take Me Down" (live 1997)	3:37
6.	"Lorenzo" (demo)	4:47
7.	"That's What You Said" (demo)	4:17
8.	"Another Time" (B-side)	5:34
9.	"It's Over" (B-side)	4:24
10.	"I Don't Want to Go" (B-side)	2:56

== Personnel ==
Credits adapted from the CD's liner notes.

Musicians

- Phil Collins – vocals, drums, percussion, kalimba (1), lead guitar (2, 5, 7, 10), rhythm guitar (2, 5, 7, 12), keyboards (5, 7–10, 12), slide guitar (12), acoustic piano (13), bagpipes (13)
- Brad Cole – keyboards (1, 3, 4, 6, 11), strings (8), organ (9, 10, 13)
- Daryl Stuermer – lead guitar (1, 3, 4, 6, 8, 13), rhythm guitar (2, 5, 7, 9, 10), guitars (11)
- Ronnie Caryl – rhythm guitar (1–10, 13), lead guitar solo (12)
- Nathan East – bass guitar
- Amy Keys – backing vocals (1, 3, 6, 8–11)
- Arnold McCuller – backing vocals (1, 3, 6, 8–11)
- Vine Street Horns (1, 4, 6, 8, 9)
  - Andrew Woolfolk – saxophones
  - Arturo Velasco – trombone
  - Harry Kim – trumpet
  - Daniel Fornero – trumpet

Production

- Produced and mixed by Phil Collins and Hugh Padgham
- Engineered by Hugh Padgham
- Assistant engineer – Simon Osborne
- Horns arranged by Harry Kim and Phil Collins
- Art direction – David Costa and Dan Einzig
- Artwork – Wherefore Art?
- Photography – Gered Mankowitz
- Michaela Odone – poem for "Lorenzo"

== Charts ==
=== Weekly charts ===
Chart (1996–1997)	Peak position
Argentine Albums (CAPIF)	4
Australian Albums (ARIA)	8
Austrian Albums (Ö3 Austria)	2
Belgian Albums (Ultratop Flanders)	15
Belgian Albums (Ultratop Wallonia)	2
Canada Top Albums/CDs (RPM)	9
Danish Albums (Hitlisten)	5
Dutch Albums (Album Top 100)	4
Estonian Albums (Eesti Top 10)	2
European Albums (Music & Media)	1
Finnish Albums (Suomen virallinen lista)	8
French Albums (SNEP)	2
German Albums (Offizielle Top 100)	1
Hungarian Albums (MAHASZ)	27
Italian Albums (Musica e Dischi)	4
Japanese Albums (Oricon)	33
New Zealand Albums (RMNZ)	33
Norwegian Albums (VG-lista)	12
Polish Albums (ZPAV)	5
Portuguese Albums (AFP)	1
Scottish Albums (Official Charts)	9
Spanish Albums (AFYVE)	3
Swedish Albums (Sverigetopplistan)	2
Swiss Albums (Schweizer Hitparade)	1
UK Albums (Official Charts)	4
US Billboard 200	23

=== Year-end charts ===
Chart (1996)	Peak position
Austrian Albums (Ö3 Austria)	37
Dutch Albums (Album Top 100)	70
French Albums (SNEP)	40
German Albums (Offizielle Top 100)	29
UK Albums (OCC)	54

Chart (1997)	Peak position
German Albums (Offizielle Top 100)	71

== Certifications ==
Region	Certification	Certified units/sales
Australia (ARIA)	Gold	35,000^{^}
Austria (IFPI Austria)	Gold	25,000^{*}
Belgium (BRMA)	Gold	25,000^{*}
Canada (Music Canada)	Platinum	100,000^{^}
France (SNEP)	2× Gold	200,000^{*}
Germany (BVMI)	Platinum	500,000^{^}
Norway (IFPI Norway)	Gold	25,000^{*}
Poland (ZPAV)	Gold	50,000^{*}
Spain (Promusicae)	Platinum	100,000^{^}
Switzerland (IFPI Switzerland)	Platinum	50,000^{^}
United Kingdom (BPI)	Gold	100,000^{^}
United States (RIAA)	Gold	500,000^{^}
Summaries
Europe (IFPI)	Platinum	1,000,000^{*}
^{*} Sales figures based on certification alone.^{^} Shipments figures based on certification alone.
