= The Phil Collins Big Band =

British big band musical ensemble

The Phil Collins Big Band - a side project of English rock drummer, singer and musician Phil Collins - performed in 1996 and 1998.

Although best known for his work in pop as a solo artist and progressive rock with Genesis, one of Collins' earliest influences had been the American big band drummer Buddy Rich. The group presented big band renditions of Collins and Genesis songs, including big hits such as "Sussudio" and "Invisible Touch". They also did performances of jazz standards such as "Stormy Weather" sung by Collins himself, and other numbers such as "Chips & Salsa" and "Pick Up the Pieces". The group was primarily an instrumental act, with Collins remaining behind the drums. The group split up in 1999, when Phil Collins started to work on the music for the then upcoming movie, Tarzan. In 2004 Phil, along with the big band, played at the Montreux Jazz Festival, covering the song "There'll Be Some Changes Made" with Tony Bennett on vocals, accompanied by pianist Ralph Sharon and double bassist Douglas Richeson. That can be found on Phil Collins 4 CD boxset Plays Well with Others, published in 2018.

The group released one album, A Hot Night in Paris, recorded in 1998 and released in 1999. The footage of Montreux Jazz Festival 1996 was featured as a bonus feature on the 2010 DVD Phil Collins Live at Montreux.

Collins' work with the Phil Collins Big Band received acclaim and Modern Drummer readers voted him Big Band drummer of the year in 2000.

== Personnel ==
Rhythm section

- Phil Collins – drums, band leader, rare vocals (Stormy Weather)
- Brad Cole – keyboards
- Daryl Stuermer – guitars
- Doug Richeson – double bass
- Luis Conte – percussion

Horn section

- Harry Kim – musical director, trumpet, bugle
- Daniel Fornero – trumpet, bugle
- Tito Carrillo – trumpet
- Alan Hood – trumpet, bugle
- Ron Modell – trumpet, bugle
- Scott Bliege – trombone
- Mark Bettcher – trombone
- Antonio Garcia – bass trombone
- Matt James – alto saxophone, woodwinds
- Kevin Sheehan – baritone saxophone, woodwinds
- Chris Collins – tenor saxophone, woodwinds
- Ian Nevins – tenor saxophone, woodwinds
- Larry Panella – tenor saxophone, woodwinds
