= Taking It All Too Hard =

Single by Genesis

from the album Genesis
- B-side: "Silver Rainbow"
- Released: June 1984
- Genre: Progressive rock
- Length: 3:56
- Label: Atlantic
- Songwriters: Tony Banks, Phil Collins, Mike Rutherford
- Producers: Genesis, Hugh Padgham

Genesis singles chronology
"Illegal Alien" (1984)	"Taking It All Too Hard" (1984)	"Invisible Touch" (1986)

"Taking It All Too Hard" is the sixth track from the self-titled album by the English rock band Genesis, released in 1983. It was sung by Phil Collins, who co-wrote the song with Tony Banks and Mike Rutherford.

In the United States, "Taking It All Too Hard" was issued as the fourth single from Genesis, with the eighth track from the album, "Silver Rainbow," included as the single's B-side. Billboard reported that "Taking It All Too Hard" was the fifth most added song in the adult contemporary radio format during the week of 23 June 1984. It peaked at No. 11 on the Billboard Adult Contemporary Chart and reached No. 50 on the Billboard Hot 100.

== Reception ==
Cashbox said that "Collins' versatile vocals help make this song another potential mega-hit." Billboard called it an "intriguing fourth single from the Genesis album" with a "light Latin beat and a dozen key changes."

== Personnel ==
- Phil Collins – drums, percussion, vocals
- Tony Banks – keyboards
- Mike Rutherford – guitars, bass

== Chart performance ==
=== Weekly charts ===
Chart (1984)	Peak position
US Billboard Hot 100	50
US Adult Contemporary (Billboard)	11
US Mainstream Rock (Billboard)	41
