= Harry Kim (trumpeter) =

American musician (1951–2026)

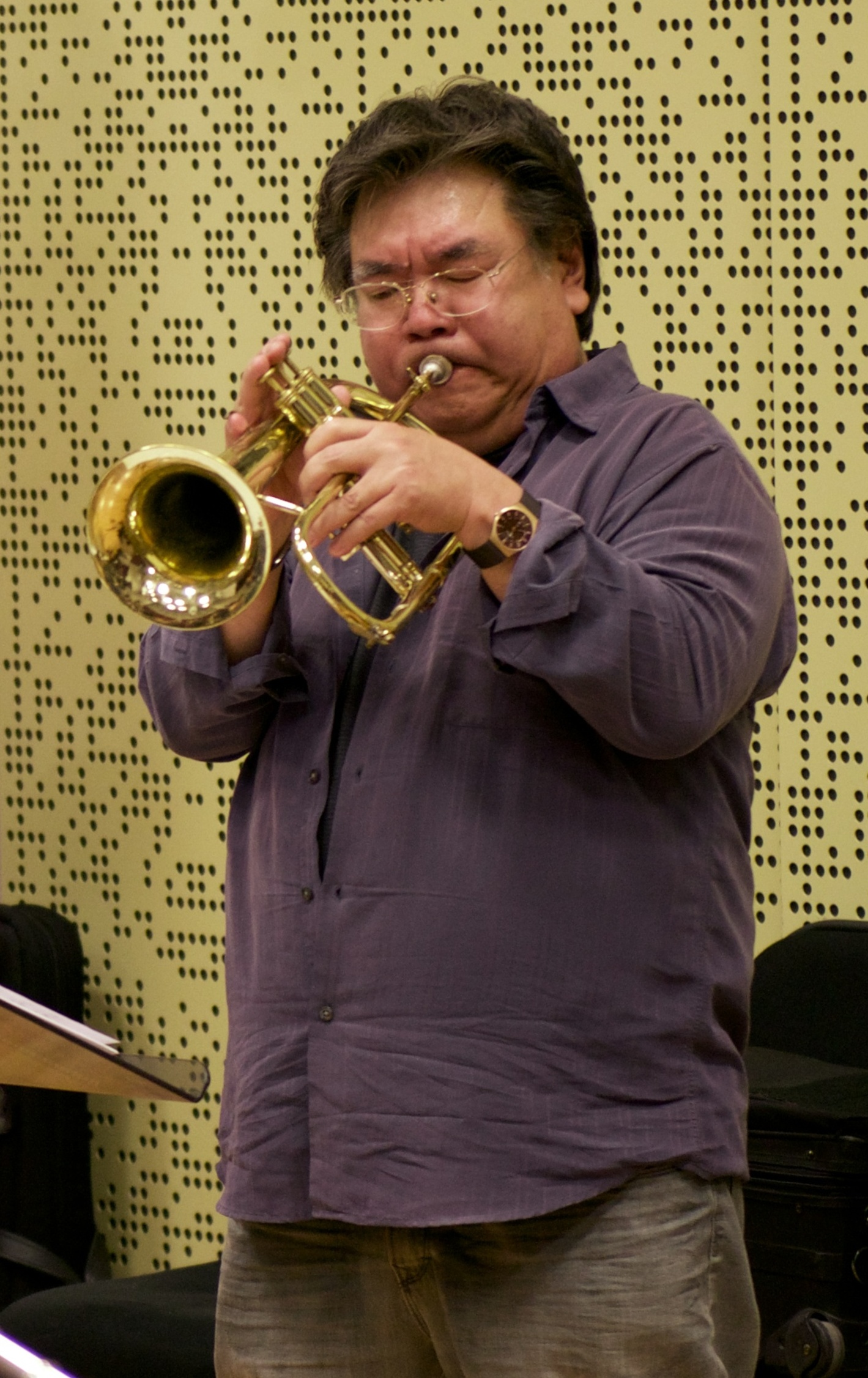
- Kim in 2014
- Born: Harry Dixon Kim; August 14, 1951; New York City, U.S.
- Died: April 10, 2026 (aged 74)
- Occupation: Musician

Harry Dixon Kim (August 14, 1951 – April 10, 2026) was an American musician. He is best known for having been a member of the Phenix Horns, the celebrated horn section of Earth, Wind and Fire, as well as for his long association with Phil Collins.

== Life and career ==
Kim was born and raised in New York City, where he attended the High School for the Performing Arts and prepared for a career as a classical trumpeter. After high school, Kim relocated to Los Angeles where he discovered an interest in the world of funk and jazz. He toured throughout the United States for a few years with various show groups, R&B revues, and big bands, including the Harry James Big Band, before returning to Los Angeles to further his career.

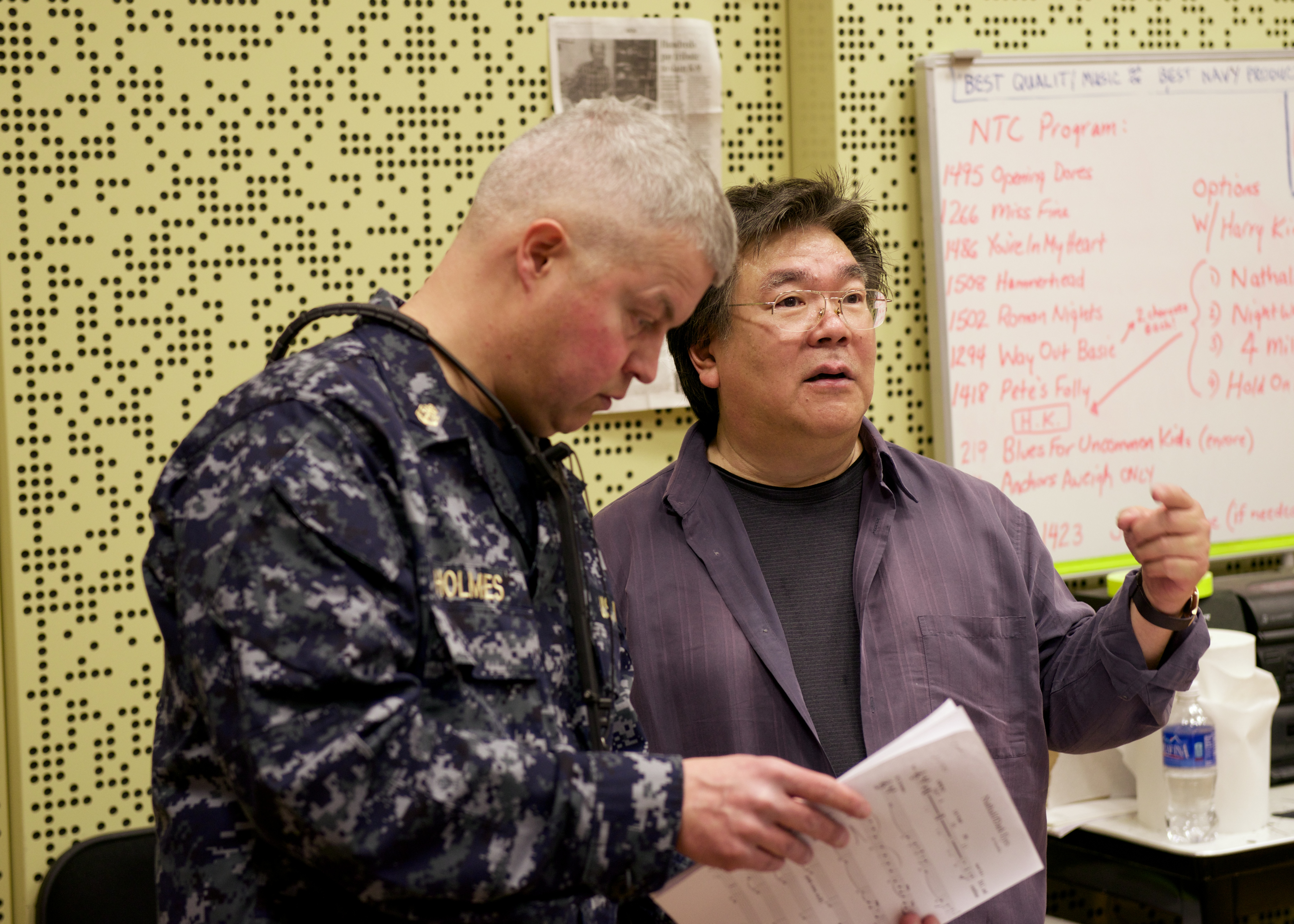
Harry Kim at the National Trumpet Competition in 2014

Latin music took a front seat during the disco era, a time when live music was rarely featured in discothèques but was in strong demand by salsa audiences. It was at this time that Kim began working with artists such as Tito Puente and Celia Cruz, and also began honing his arranging skills by writing and performing on many disco productions.

Soon, Kim joined Stevie Wonder's Wonder Love, which opened opportunities to perform and record with artists such as Marvin Gaye, Aretha Franklin, The Four Tops, The Temptations, and Smokey Robinson. He was on stage for the Emmy Award-winning 25th Anniversary of Motown, performing with many of Motown's greatest stars. It was an evening highlighted by Michael Jackson's introduction of his now legendary moonwalk.

In 1985, Kim joined the Phenix Horns, the celebrated horn section of Earth, Wind and Fire. Together they performed with various artists throughout the U.S., Europe, and Asia. Included were two tours in 1987 and 1988 with French icon Michel Berger and vocalist France Gall.

In 1989, Kim participated in the making of Phil Collins's multi-award-winning album ...But Seriously. A world tour followed in 1990, marking the beginning of a long association with Collins. The multi-platinum live concert CD Serious Hits Live was released soon afterwards.

Realizing the many advantages of being part of a high-performance horn section, Kim founded The Vine Street Horns. He called together musicians with whom he had worked for many years. Numerous productions with various artists were to follow. In 1994 Phil Collins called on The Vine Street Horns to join him on his Both Sides Tour, an extensive 18-month world tour.

In 1996, he was asked by Collins to organize a big band featuring adaptations of his music and the music of Genesis in a jazz setting. The Phil Collins Big Band was born. As music director and arranger, Kim and The Vine Street Horns took center stage performing at all the major European jazz festivals, with Tony Bennett as vocalist and Quincy Jones as guest conductor.

1996 was also the year The Vine Street Horns recorded Phil Collins' album Dance into the Light. Collins' band then toured the world in 1997. The year 1998 saw another Phil Collins Big Band tour, resulting in a live CD entitled A Hot Night in Paris. Later that year an introduction to France's legendary singer Johnny Hallyday led to three sold-out performances at the Stade de France (seating 81,338 people), five successful tours from 1998 to 2009, and numerous top-selling concert CDs and DVDs.

He continued to tour throughout the world with Johnny Hallyday and Phil Collins, and also acted as horn section leader and arranger for the 2005–2009 seasons of American Idol as well as for America's Got Talent and Celebrity Duets.

Harry Kim died from cancer on April 10, 2026, at the age of 74.
