= Ronnie Caryl =

English guitarist (1953–2023)

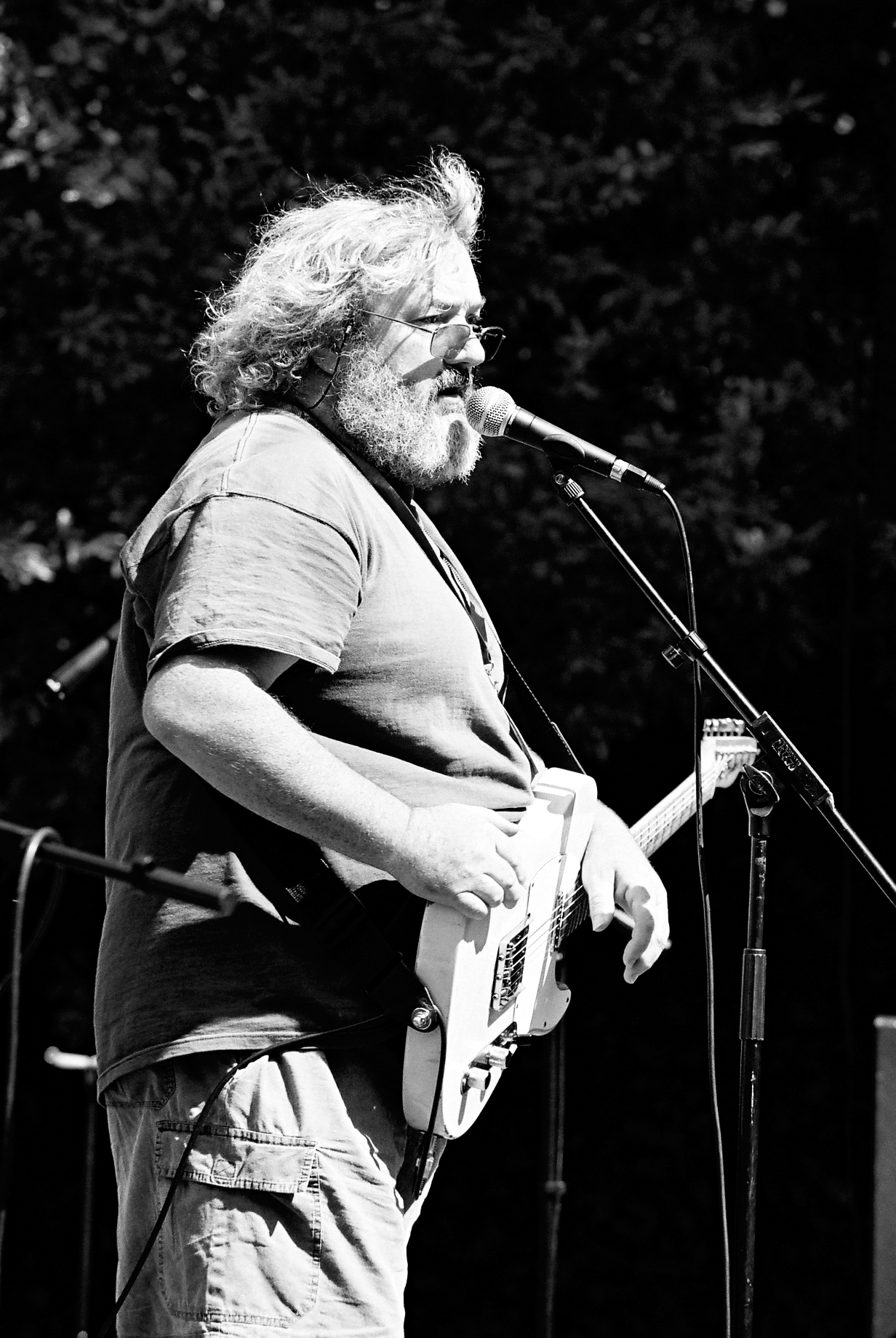
- Caryl in 2008

Background information
- Born: 10 February 1953; Liverpool, England
- Died: 18 December 2023 (aged 70)
- Genres: Blues, rock, pop
- Occupations: Singer-songwriter, musician
- Instruments: Vocals, guitar, bass guitar, piano
- Years active: 1968–2023
- Formerly of: Flaming Youth, Phil Collins

Ronnie Caryl (10 February 1953 – 18 December 2023) was an English guitarist who was a member of the band Flaming Youth. Over the years Caryl worked alongside Phil Collins, plus David Hentschel, Michel Polnareff, Lulu, Stephen Bishop, Eric Clapton, Gary Brooker, Maggie Bell and John Otway.

== Biography ==
Phil Collins was 18 when, with his friend and accomplice guitarist Ronnie Caryl, he accompanied American singer John Walker of the Walker Brothers on tour in Great Britain. The other two musicians were Gordon "Flash" Smith on bass (b. 1947, Glasgow, Strathclyde, Scotland) and Brian Chatton, the ex-organist of the Warriors, the former band of Jon Anderson. When the tour ended, the four musicians decided to stay together and try their luck as a group, so they formed Hickory and recorded a single, "Green Light/The Key", released by CBS Records on 24 January 1969. This formation would eventually become Flaming Youth, when they met authors Ken Howard and Alan Blaikley who offered to record their album. The group signed with Fontana Records and recorded the album Ark II in 1969, which was ranked "Album of the Month" by the British music magazine Melody Maker. The band played at the London Planetarium for the launch of the album in 1969. After a few concerts, the group no longer managed to generate interest from both the public and the media, and despite the addition of a new musician, the organist Rod Mayall (b. Roderick Mayall, 19 September 1946, Macclesfield, Cheshire) (the half-brother of John Mayall), Flaming Youth disbanded. Through the years Caryl and Collins remained friends, and Caryl was best man at Collins's first wedding. In 1970, they both auditioned for Genesis and whilst Collins obtained the job as drummer, Caryl was unsuccessful and after a brief stint with Mick Barnard on guitar, Steve Hackett was recruited as a permanent replacement lead guitarist for Anthony Phillips.

Caryl went on to play in some other bands, including Sanctuary in 1972, with whom he recorded an unreleased album. By the following year he joined the jazz rock outfit, Zox & the Radar Boys, including Peter Banks, Mike Piggott and Phil Collins.

Caryl moved to France in 1995 with his wife Melanie.

In 1996, Caryl became an official member of Collins's group as a backing vocalist and rhythm guitarist. As well as work with Collins, Caryl has also performed alongside David Hentschel, Michel Polnareff, Lulu, Stephen Bishop, Eric Clapton, Gary Brooker, Maggie Bell and John Otway.

Caryl released two solo albums, Leave A Light On (1994) and One Step at a Time (2003).

Caryl died on 18 December 2023, at the age of 70. His sister Zoe announced on Facebook that a memorial for him would be held 23 December in Saintes, France.

== Discography ==
=== Flaming Youth ===
==== Singles ====
- "Guide Me, Orion" – Fontana Records (1969)
- "Man, Woman and Child" – Fontana Records (1970)
- "From Now On (Immortal Invisible)" – Fontana Records (1970)

==== Albums ====
- Ark 2 – Fontana Records (1969)

=== Solo ===
==== Singles ====
- "You Got It" – Polydor Records (1983)
- "Somewhere Within" – Full Colour Records (1994)

==== Albums ====
- Leave A Light On – Full Colour Records (1994)
- One Step at a Time – Outside Records (2003)

=== Session work ===
- 1975 : Album – David Hentschel: Startling Music
- 1975 : Album – Eugene Wallace: Dangerous
- 1977 : Single – Michel Polnareff: "Lettre A France"
- 1981 : Album – Lulu: Lulu
- 1982 : Album – Lulu: Take Me To Your Heart Again
- 1989 : Album – Stephen Bishop: Bowling in Paris
- 1996 : Album – Phil Collins: Dance into the Light
- 2004 : Album – Maggie Bell: The River Sessions (recorded live at the Pavilion in Glasgow, Scotland, on 1 November 1993)
- 2010 : Album – Phil Collins: Going Back

=== DVDs ===
- 1997 : Phil Collins – Live And Loose in Paris
- 2004 : Phil Collins – Finally...The First Farewell Tour
- 2007 : Phil Collins – The Long Goodnight: A Film About Phil Collins

== Tours ==
- 1981 / 1983 : with Lulu
- 1987 : with John Otway
- 1993 : with Maggie Bell
- 1994 / 1995 : with The Free Spirit
- 1996 : with Phil Collins – 'Dance into the Light Tour'
- 1999 : with Phil Collins – 'Tarzan Tour'
- 2002 / 2003 : with Phil Collins – 'Testify Tour'
- 2003 : with Phil Collins – 'Brother Bear Tour'
- 2004 / 2005 : with Phil Collins – 'The First Farewell Tour'
- 2017 : with Phil Collins – 'Not Dead Yet Tour'

== Different shows ==
- 1972 : Shoot Up at Elbow Creek
- 1977 : Elvis – Theatre musical
- 1986 : Tutti Frutti – BBC Television series with Emma Thompson
- 1992 / 1993 : Good Rockin' Tonight !
